= List of department stores in Downtown Los Angeles =

Department stores' list in Los Angeles

This is a list of department stores and some other major retailers in the four major corridors of Downtown Los Angeles: Spring Street between Temple and Second ("heyday" from c.1884–1910); Broadway between 1st and 4th (c.1895-1915) and from 4th to 11th (c.1896-1950s); and Seventh Street between Broadway and Figueroa/Francisco, plus a block of Flower St. (c.1915 and after). They are ordered by geography (Spring Street and Broadway, north to south; Seventh Street, east to west). Part of the History of Retail in Southern California.

Store	Opened	Left	Moved or closed?	Location	Sq ft	Sq m	Architects	Current use
SPRING ST. BETWEEN TEMPLE AND SECOND
Coulter's (1st sequential location)	1884	1898	Moved	SW corner 2nd & Spring (Hollenbeck Block)				Historic Broadway station
Hamburger's (1st seq. loc.)	1888	1908	Moved	Franklin & Spring (Phillips Block)			Burgess J. Reeve	Site of City Hall
Mullen & Bluett	1889	1910	Moved	101–105 N. Spring				Empty lot
Jacoby Bros. (1st seq. loc.)	1891	1900	Moved	128–138 N. Spring at Court				Site of City Hall
The Hub	1896	1916	Moved	Spring at Court (Bullard Block)			Morgan & Walls	Site of City Hall. The Hub moved to 430 S. Broadway.
BROADWAY
Broadway from 2nd to 3rd
Ville de Paris (A. Fusenot Co.)	1893	1898	Moved	221-223 S. Broadway (Potomac Block)			Block, Curlett & Eisen	added to Coulter's late 1907, demolished 1958, now a parking lot
Coulter's (3rd seq. loc.)	1905	1917	Moved	225-229 S. Broadway through to 224-228 S. Hill. 1907: expanded into 219-223 Broadway (Potomac Block)	157,000	14,586	Block, Curlett & Eisen	demolished, site of parking lot
Boston Dry Goods (J.W. Robinson Co.)	1895	1915	Moved	237–241 S. Broadway			Theodore Eisen, Sumner Hunt	Parking lot
I. Magnin/ Myer Siegel (1st seq. loc.)	1899		Moved	251 S. Broadway (Irvine Byrne Block)			Sumner Hunt	Wedding chapel
Broadway from 3rd to 4th
Coulter's (2nd seq. loc.)	1898	1905	Moved	317–325 S. Broadway through to 314–322 Hill St. (Homer Laughlin Building)	86,000		John B. Parkinson	became Ville de Paris; Now Grand Central Market
Ville de Paris (2nd seq. loc.)	1905	1917	Moved.	317–325 S. Broadway through to 314–322 Hill Street (Homer Laughlin Building)	96,000	8919	John B. Parkinson	Grand Central Market
Jacoby Bros. (2nd seq. loc.)	1899	1935–6	Moved	331-335 S. Broadway	60,000	5574	John B. Parkinson	Was "Boston Store" in late 1930s. Currently independent retail. 2 of 4 floors were removed.
J. J. Haggarty; New York Store	1905	1917	Moved	337–339 S. Broadway				Small retail. Only 2 stories remain.
J. M. Hale (Hale's)	1909			341–345 S. Broadway (Karl's Building)			Abram M. Edelman	retail, top floors were removed
Broadway from 4th to 5th
The Broadway (1st seq. loc.)	1896	1973	Moved	SW corner 4th & Broadway, later through to Hill (Broadway Mart Center)	1924, 577,000	53,605	Parkinson and Bergstrom	
Bon Marché		1907	Liquidated	430 S. Broadway (Bumiller Building)			Morgan & Walls	
The Hub (2nd seq. loc.)	1907	1916	Moved	430 S. Broadway (Bumiller Building)			Morgan & Walls	In 1907, The Hub opened at the former Bon Marché. In March 1916, The Hub moved to 337–9 S. Spring. closing in 1922.
Myer Siegel (2nd seq. loc.)	1899		Moved	455 S. Broadway				Became part of Fallas Paredes
Broadway from 5th to 6th
Fifth Street Store (Steele, Faris & Walker), later Walker's	1905		Closed	SW corner 5th & Broadway (Fifth Street Store Building)	1917: 278,640	1917:25,887	Alexander Curlett	Replaced existing store with new building in 1917. Building later housed Ohrbach's
Ohrbach's			Closed	SW corner 5th & Broadway (Fifth Street Store Building)			Alexander Curlett	Former Walker's store. Building later housed Ohrbach's
Silverwoods	1904			556 S. Broadway (NE corner of 6th) (Silverwood's Building)	1920: 115,420	1920: 10,723	Walker & Eisen	Broadway Jewelry Mart
Swelldom	1920	1970s	Closed	555–561 S. Broadway (NW corner of 5th) (Swelldom Building)			Davis & Davis; Henry F. Withey	Small retail
Broadway from 6th to 7th
Jacoby Bros. (3rd seq. loc.)	1936	1938	Liquidated	605 S. Broadway				Became a Zukor's (1940), now mixed-use
Central Dept. Store	1907	1908		609–619 S. Broadway	85,000	7897	Samuel Tilden Norton	Demolished, now site of Los Angeles Theatre
Myer Siegel (3rd seq. loc.)			Moved	617 S. Broadway			Samuel Tilden Norton	Demolished, now site of Los Angeles Theatre
Mullen & Bluett (2nd seq. loc.)	1910	1960s	Moved	610 S. Broadway (Walter P. Story Building)			Morgan, Walls & Clements	Mixed-use
Desmond's	1924	1972	Closed	616 S. Broadway (Desmond's Building)	85,000	7897	A. C. Martin	Renovated 2019 as office space, a restaurant and a rooftop bar.
Harris & Frank; 2nd concurrent location	1947	1980	Closed	644 S. Broadway (J. E. Carr Building)			Robert Brown Young	
Bullock's (1st seq. loc.)	1907	1983	Closed^{b}	NW corner 7th & Broadway by 1934, most of the block 6th/ 7th/ Broadway/ Hill	1907: 350,000; 1934: 806,000	1907: 32,516; 1934: 74,880	Parkinson & Bergstrom	St. Vincents Jewelry Mart
Broadway from 7th to 8th
F.W. Woolworth	1920			719 S. Broadway (Woolworth's Building)			Weeks and Day	Ross Dress for Less
Reich and Lièvre	1917	c.1927		737–745 S. Broadway (Issacs Building)				
Broadway from 8th to 9th
Hamburger's (2nd seq. loc.); After 1925: May Company (1st loc.)	1906	1986	Moved	SW corner 8th & Broadway (May Company Building)	1906: 482,475; 1930, >1,000,000	1906: 44,823, 1930 92,903	Alfred F. Rosenheim	Under renovation to become tech campus
Eastern Columbia	1930	1957		849 S. Broadway through to Hill (Eastern Columbia Building)	1930: 275,650 (expanded in 1950)	1930: 25,609	Claud Beelman	Residential condo
Broadway from 9th to 10th
Blackstone's	1917			901 S. Broadway (SE corner 9th) (Blackstone's Department Store Building)	118,800	11,037	John Parkinson	Building became The Famous, now residential, retail
SEVENTH STREET BETWEEN BROADWAY AND FRANCISCO)
Seventh from Broadway to Hill
Bullock's (see above)
Seventh from Hill to Olive
Ville de Paris, from 1919 B. H. Dyas	1917	1933	Liquidated	420 W. 7th (SE corner Olive)			Dodd and Richards	L.A. Jewelry Mart
Seventh from Olive to Grand
Haggarty's	1917	1963	Closed	520–530 W. 7th at Grand (Brockman Building)			George D. Barnett, Barnett, Haynes & Barnett	Apartments
Coulter's (4th seq. loc.)	1917	1938	Moved	500 W. 7th (SW corner Olive)			Dodd and Richards	Mixed-use. Coulter's moved to Miracle Mile.
Seventh from Grand to Hope
J. W. Robinson's (2nd seq. loc.)	1915	1993	Closed	600 W. 7th (7th, Hope & Grand)	1915: 400,000; 1923: 623,700 sq ft (57,940 m^{2})	1915: 37,161; 1923: 57,944	Noonan & Richards (1915), Edgar Mayberry/Allison & Allison (1934 remodel)	Mixed-use
Desmond's 7th St. (2nd seq. loc.)	1934, expanded 1937		Closed	617 W. 7th. St. (2nd Union Oil Building)	22,500 (1937)	2090	Alexander Curlett and Claude Beelman	Walgreens
Seventh from Hope to Flower
The Broadway (2nd loc.), later Macy's	1973	Open	Open	750 W. 7th (Hope to Flower) (Broadway Plaza)	250,000	23,226	Charles Luckman	In operation
Desmond's 7th St. (1st seq. loc.) (B'way store remained open)	1927	1934	Moved	717 W. 7th St. (Roosevelt Building)			Alexander Curlett and Claude Beelman	Shoo Shoo Baby (restaurant)
Barker Bros. (final downtown loc.)	1926	1984	Closed	818 W. 7th (Flower to Figueroa)	1,000,000	93,000	Curlett and Beelman	Offices
Seventh from Figueroa to Francisco
Bullock's (2nd seq. loc.), later Macy's	1986	1996	Closed	735 S. Figueroa (Seventh Market Place)			Jon Jerde	Gold's Gym (level M1), Target (M2), Zara (M3)
May Company (2nd seq. loc.), later Macy's	1986	2009^{a}	Closed	735 S. Figueroa (Seventh Market Place)			Jon Jerde	Nordstrom Rack (level M1), Target (M2), H&M (M3)
FLOWER STREET FROM SEVENTH TO EIGHTH
Weatherby-Kayser shoes	1925			715–719 S. Flower				
Myer Siegel (4th seq. loc.)	1927			733 S. Flower				
Parmelee-Dohrmann (homewares)	1927			741–747 S. Flower				

^{a}as Macy's, ^{b}reopened in 1986 at Citicorp Plaza, now FIGat7th.
