= 7th Street (Los Angeles) =

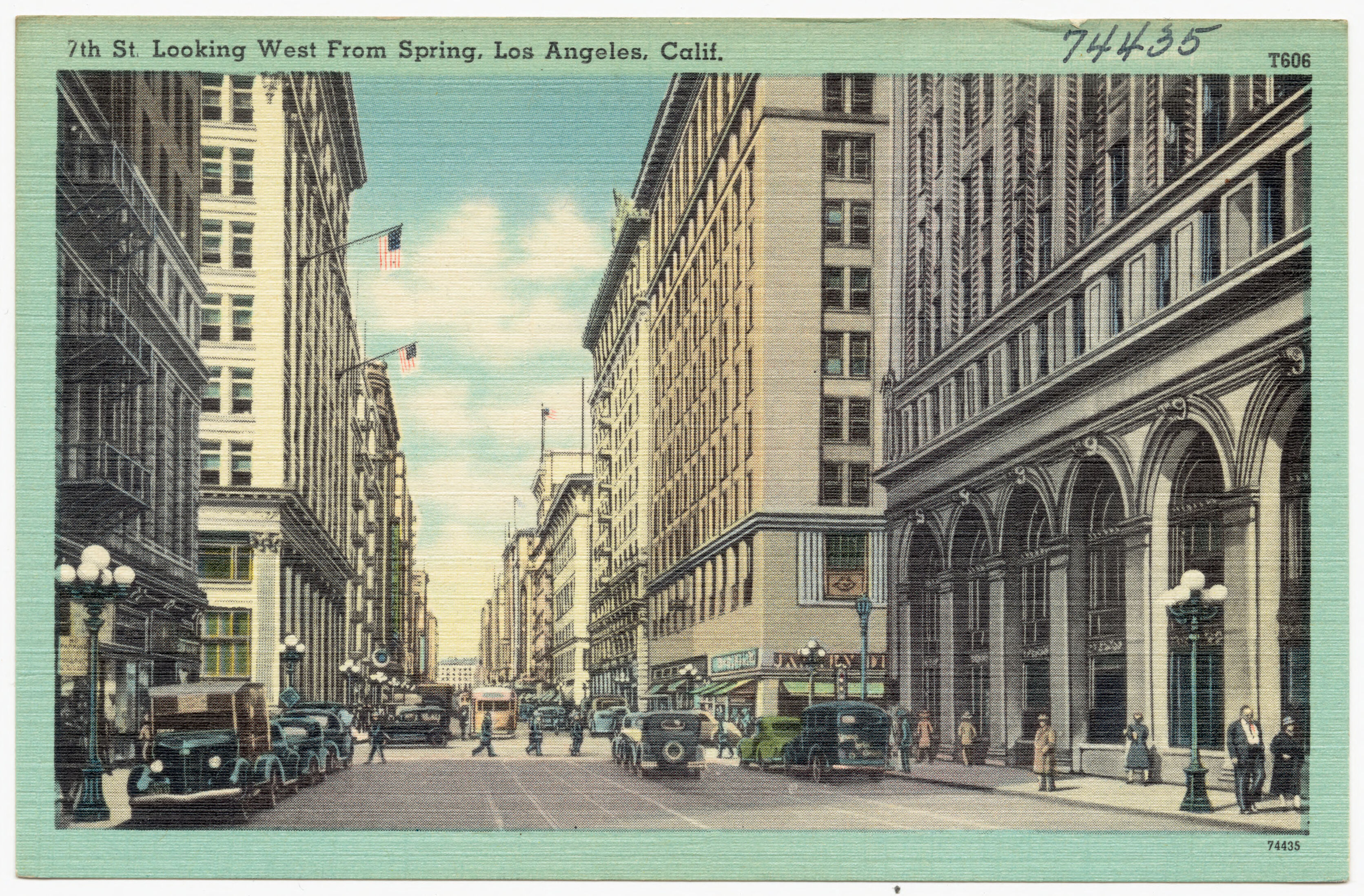
7th Street Looking West from Spring, Los Angeles, Calif. (Tichnor Bros. postcard, 1930s)

7th Street is a street in Los Angeles, California running from S. Norton Ave in Mid-Wilshire through Downtown Los Angeles to Euclid Avenue in Boyle Heights.

Originally agricultural land, 7th Street between Broadway (on which corner stood Bullock's complex) and Figueroa Street, became downtown's upscale shopping district. This began with J. W. Robinson's deciding to build their flagship store in 1915 on Seventh far to the west of the existing Broadway shopping district, between Hope and Grand streets. The Ville de Paris and Coulter's as well as numerous specialty shops came and rounded out the district.

The area lost its exclusivity when the upscale downtown stores opened branches in Hollywood, Mid-Wilshire, Westwood and Pasadena in the late 1920s through the 1940s, notably the establishment of Bullock's upscale landmark branch Bullocks Wilshire in Mid-Wilshire in 1929.

Thirteen large office buildings opened between 1920 and 1928. By 1929, every plot on 7th between Figueroa and Los Angeles Streets had been developed. The area remained an important, if not the most exclusive, center of retail and office space throughout the 1950s, but started a slow decline throughout the 1980s due to suburbanization. It was also the concentration of Downtown financial activity on Bunker Hill, a few blocks north. The flagship department stores like Bullock's (1983), Barker Brothers (1984) and Robinson's (1993) had closed and only the Broadway/Macy's at The Bloc, previously named Broadway Plaza remained. However, in 1986, the Seventh Market Place mall, now FIGat7th, opened, bringing a smaller retail cluster back to Seventh such as the 7th Street/Metro Center station opening in 1991.

With new, large skyscrapers such as the Wilshire Grand Center and the nearby U.S. Bank Tower bridging the gap with Bunker Hill, Seventh Street is now contiguous to the large financial district to the north and is once again a highly desired office district.

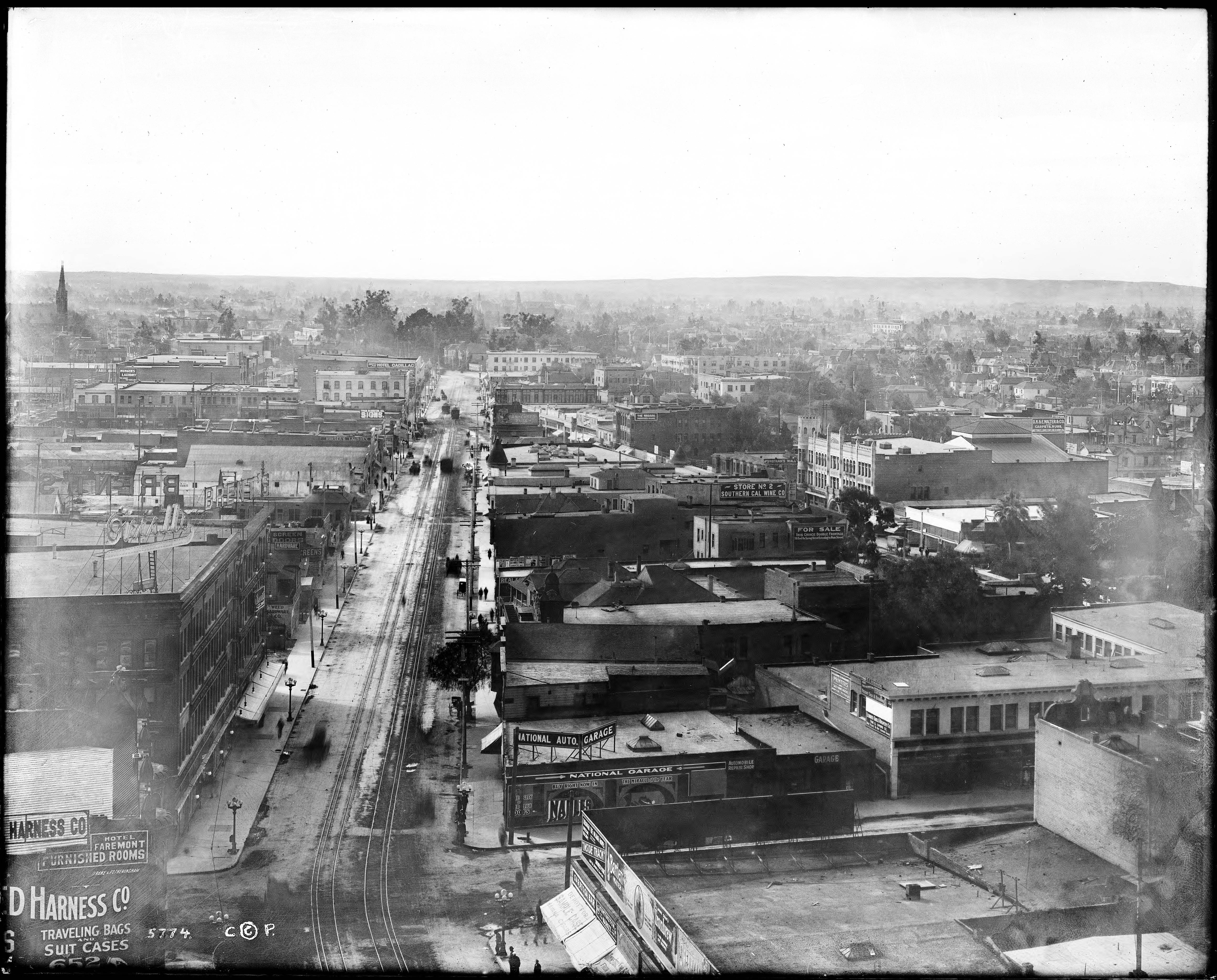
1907, west along 7th from Main

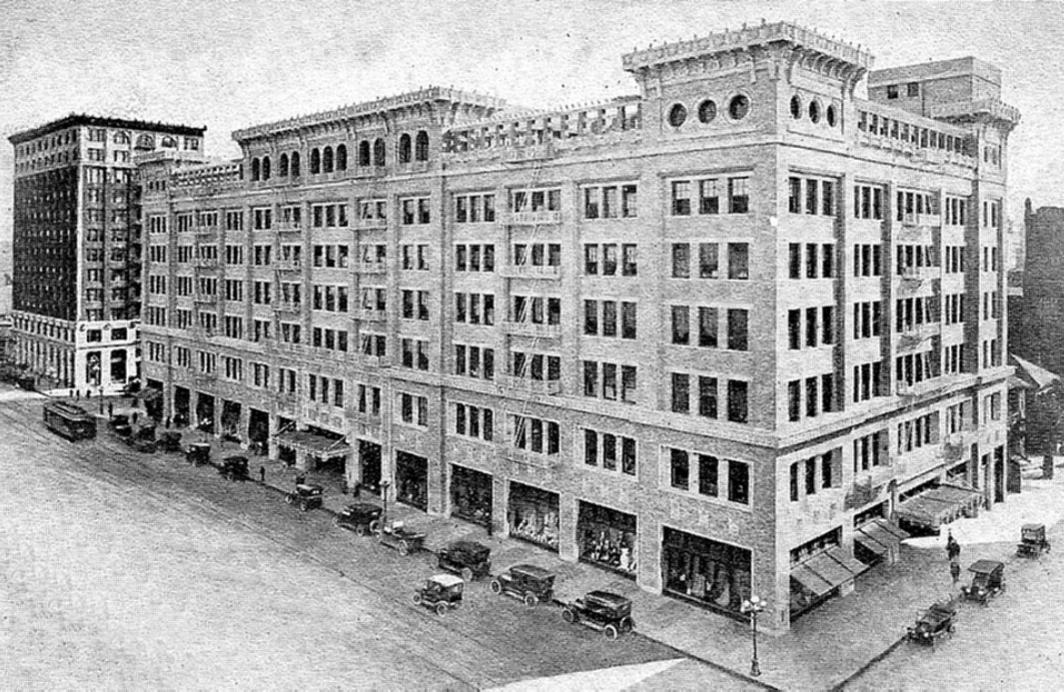
1915, opening of J. W. Robinson's new flagship

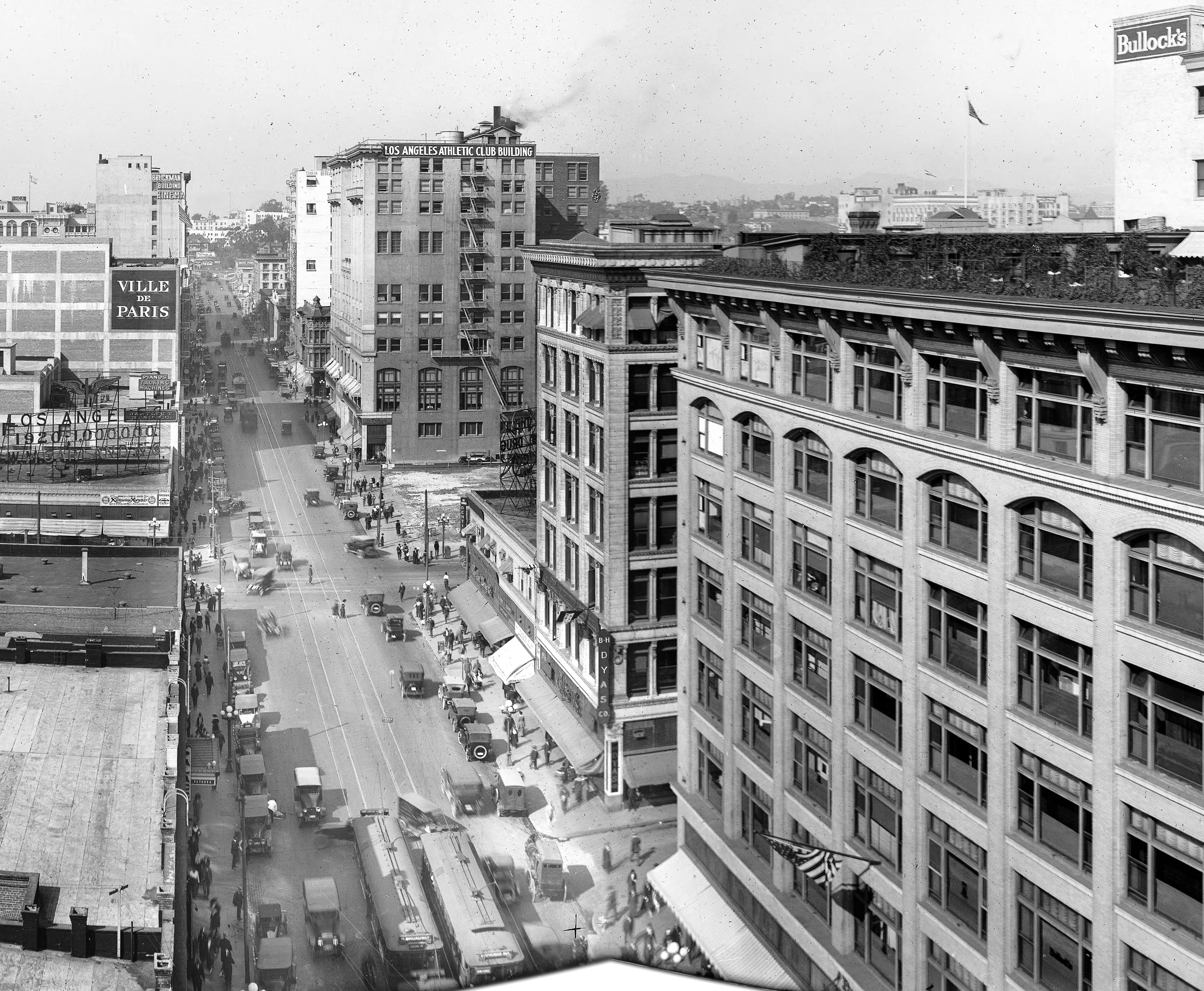
1917, west along 7th from Broadway

== Landmarks ==
In order from west to east.

=== Harbor Freeway to Figueroa ===
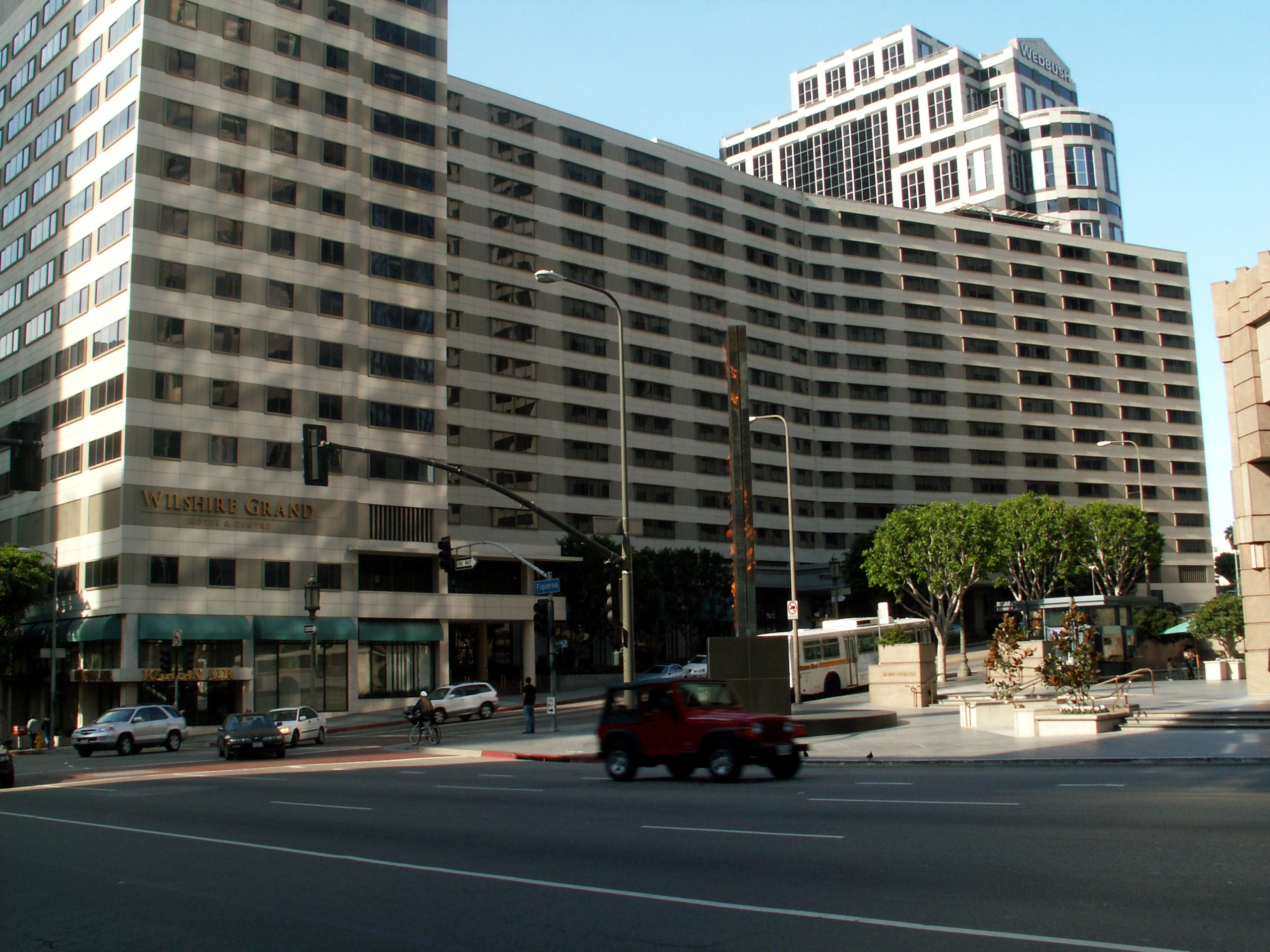
Wilshire Grand, orig. Hotel Statler, demolished

- Wilshire Grand Center, north side, tallest building in the Western United States. Located on the site of the original Wilshire Grand Hotel, opened in 1952 as the Hotel Statler. In 1954, renamed the Statler Hilton. In 1968, renovated and renamed the Los Angeles Hilton, and later the Los Angeles Hilton and Towers. Renovated again in 1963.
- FIGat7th, shopping center, originally called Seventh Market Place, housing both a Bullock's and May Co. branch in the 1980s-1990s

=== Figueroa to Flower ===
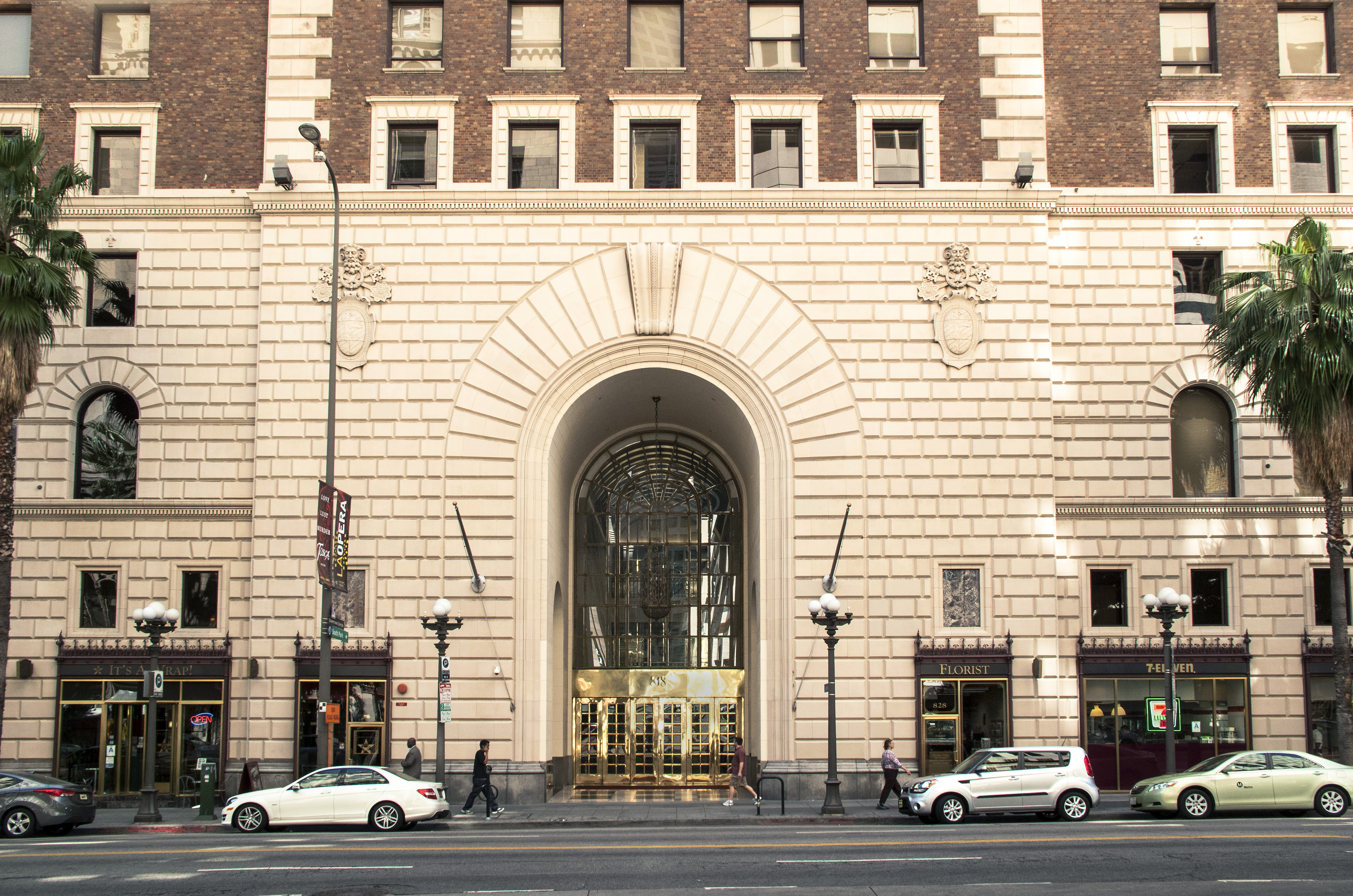
Barker Brothers Building

- Barker Brothers Building (818 Building) 818 W. Seventh Street, Curlett and Beelman (1926), Los Angeles Historic-Cultural Monument #356, Renaissance Revival, home of Barker Bros. furniture and homewares department store. Now offices.
- Home Savings of America Tower (Figueroa Tower), 831 W. Seventh Street, Albert C. Martin and Associates (1989).
- Fine Arts Building, 811 W. Seventh Street, Walker and Eisen (1926), Los Angeles Historic-Cultural Monument #125
- 7th Street/Metro Center light rail (A and E lines) and subway (B and D lines) station at 7th & Flower

=== Flower to Hope ===
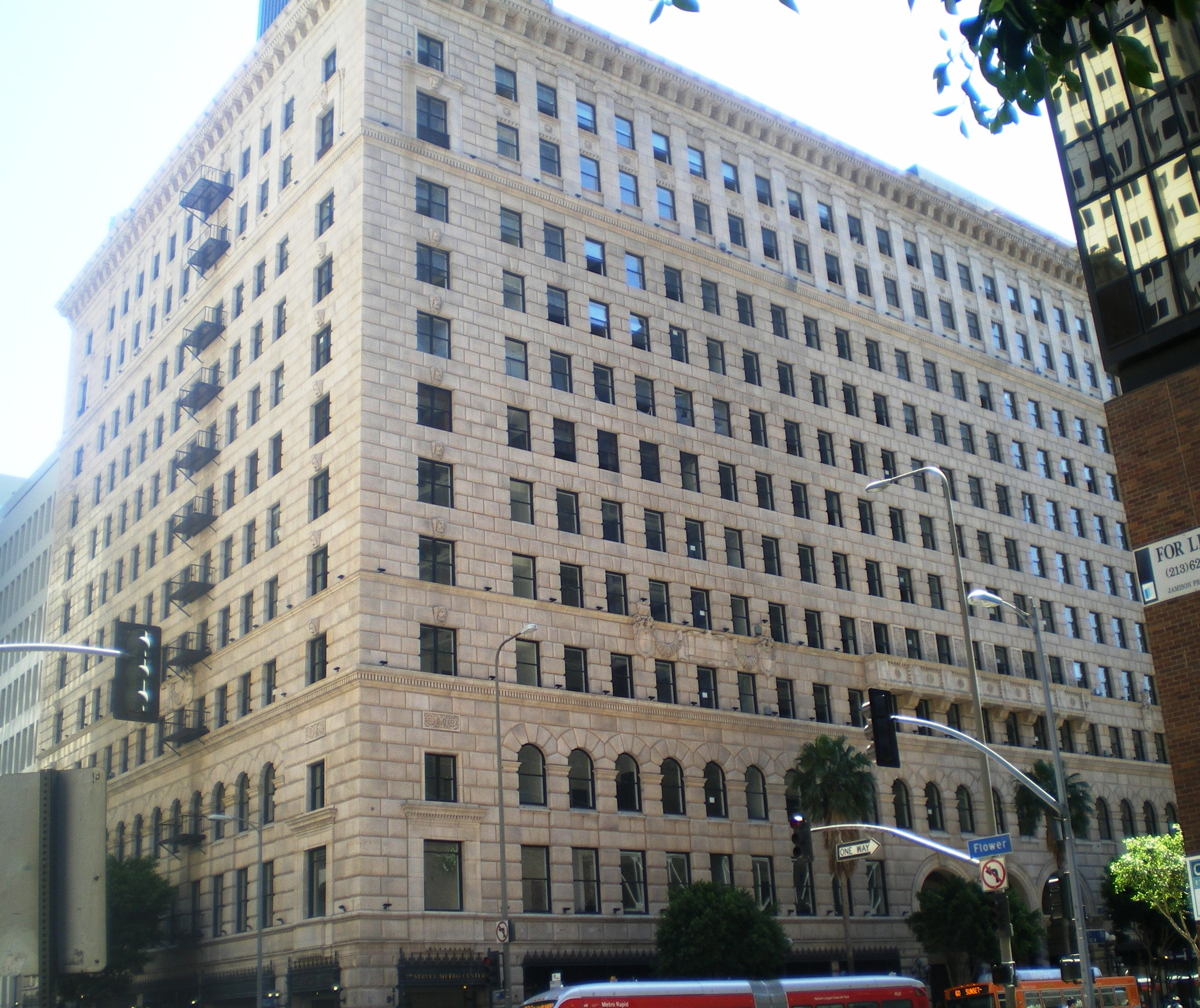
Roosevelt Building

- Roosevelt Building (The Roosevelt), 727 W. Seventh Street, Curlett and Beelman (1927), Los Angeles Historic-Cultural Monument #355/ National Register of Historic Places: Renaissance Revival building, purported to be the largest office building in Southern California when it opened. Curlett and Beelman designed six buildings on Seventh Street. Converted in 2008 to 222 residential units. Spectacular original restored mosaic marble floors in the lobby.
- The Bloc Los Angeles, originally built in 1973 called the Broadway Plaza, housing The Broadway department store after it moved from Broadway and 4th streets, now a Macy's

=== Hope to Grand ===
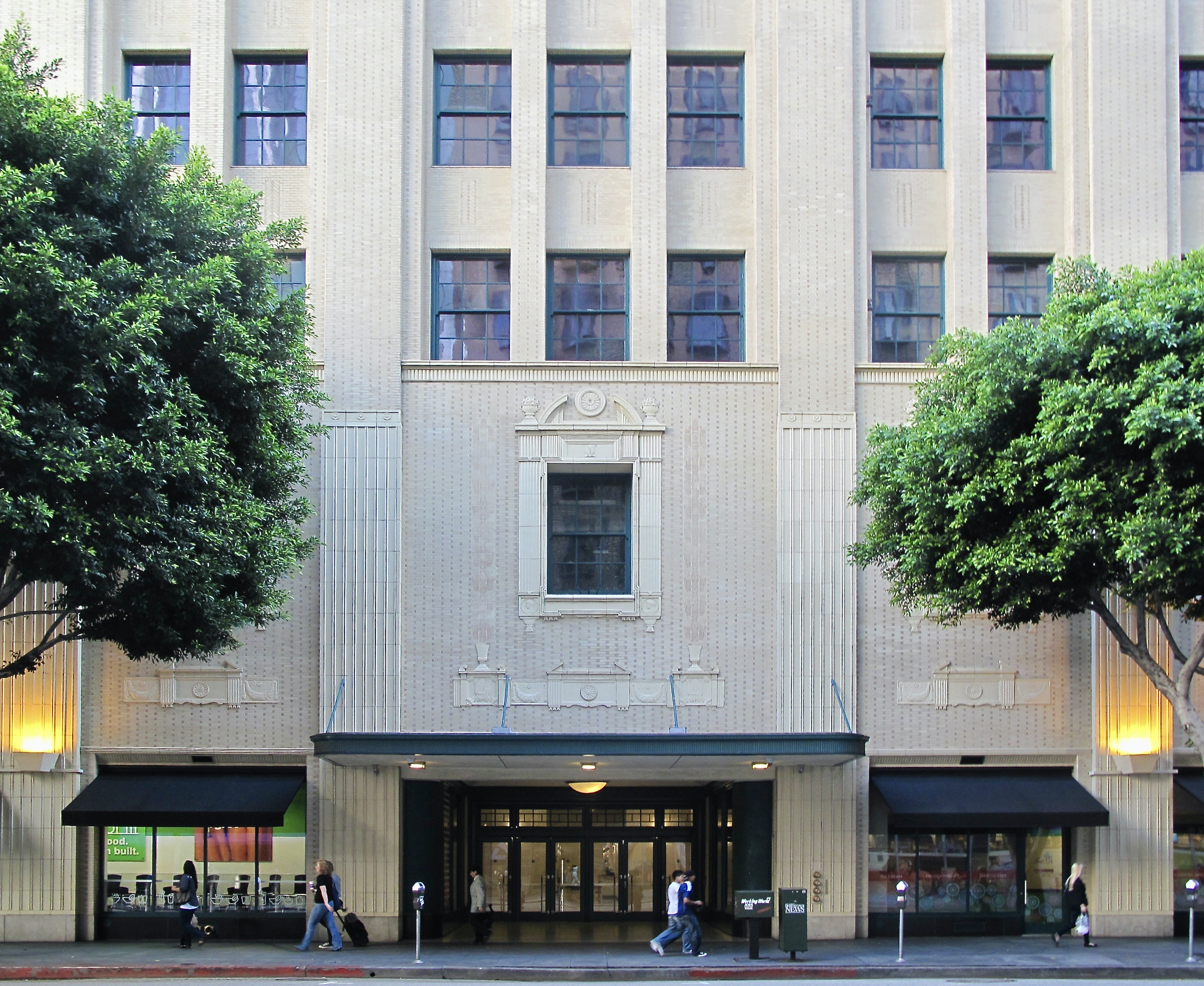
J. W. Robinson's Building, 600 W. 7th St.

- J. W. Robinson's Building, 600 W. Seventh Street, Noonan and Richards (1915), Edgar Mayberry with Allison and Allison (1934 remodel), Los Angeles. The first major department store to move to Seventh Street from Broadway. Almost nine acres of floor space on seven floors. Robinson’s was immediately successful and spurred the further development of 7th Street as an upscale shopping district. In 1934, a major remodel gave the store its current Moderne façade, replacing the original Beaux Arts design.
- Second Union Oil Building, 617 W. Seventh Street, NE corner 7th & Hope, architects Curlett and Beelman (1923)
- Broadway Plaza (later Macy’s Plaza, now The Bloc), 700 W. Seventh Street, Charles Luckman Associates (1973): hotel, offices and shopping center originally with a Broadway department store branch replacing its downtown flagship on Broadway (the street)

=== Grand to Olive ===
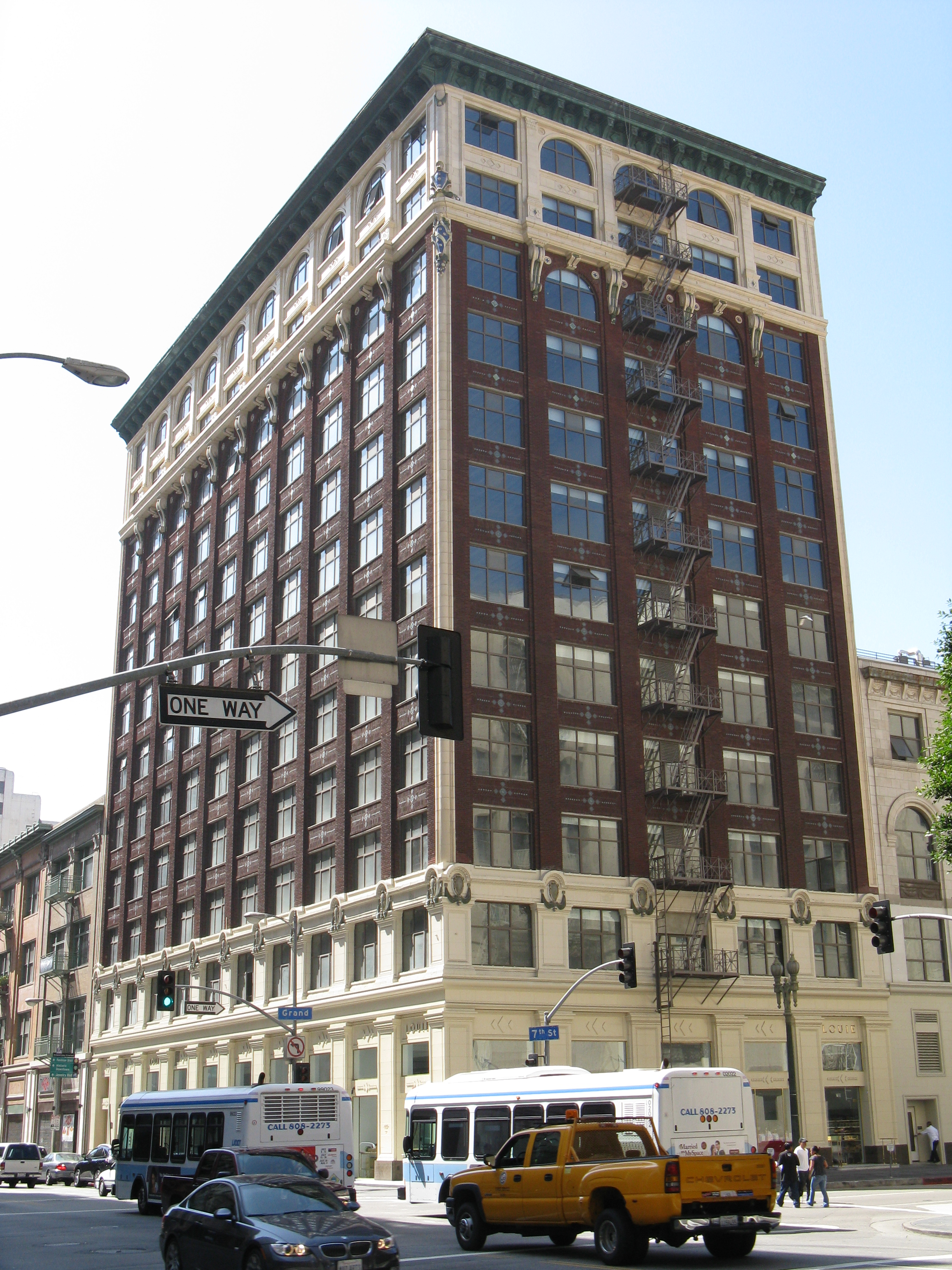
Brockman Building

- Brockman Building, 530 W. Seventh Street, Barnett, Haynes and Barnett (1912), National Register of Historic Places. The flagship J. J. Haggarty department store occupied the ground floor from 1917 through 1963. Now residential lofts and Bottega Louie restaurant.
- Quinby Building, 529 W. Seventh Street, Meyer and Holler (1926)
- Bronson Building (The Collection), 527 W. Seventh Street, Austin and Pennell (1913). Originally the Brack Shops, independent shops grouped together as a sort of department store.
- Brock and Company Building (Mas Malo/ Seven Grand), 515 W. Seventh Street, Dodd and Richards (1922), Los Angeles Historic-Cultural Monument #358
- Bank of Italy Building (Giannini Place), 505 W. Seventh / 649 S. Olive, Morgan, Walls and Morgan (1922), Los Angeles Historic-Cultural Monument #354, now Hotel Per La.
- Coulter Dry Goods Company (later Myer Siegel, Dohrmann's, now The Mandel), 500 W. Seventh Street, Dodd and Richards (1917)

=== Olive to Hill ===
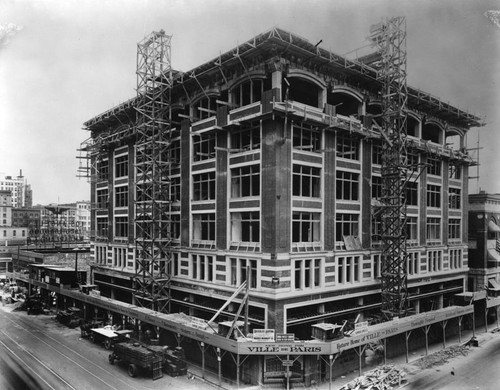
Ville de Paris (department store) under construction 1916

- Los Angeles Athletic Club, 431 W. Seventh Street, Parkinson and Bergstrom (1912), Los Angeles Historic-Cultural Monument
- Ville de Paris (department store), now L.A. Jewelry Mart, 420 W. Seventh Street, Dodd and Richards (1917)
- Dunn-Williams Building (Spreckels Building), fronting 7th and Hill, Samuel Heiman (1922), Los Angeles Historic- Cultural Monument #984, contributing property in the Hill Street Commercial Historic District
- Huntsberger-Mennell Building (International Jewelry Mart), 412 W. Seventh Street, Dodd and Richards (1917)
- Warner Brothers Downtown Theater (formerly Pantages Theatre, now Downtown Jewelry Exchange) 401 W. Seventh Street, B. Marcus Priteca (1920), contributing property in the Hill Street Commercial Historic District
- Foreman & Clark Building (Jewelry Design Center), 400 W. Seventh Street, Curlett and Beelman (1928), Gothic Revival-style structure, contributing property in the Hill Street Commercial Historic District
- Sun Drug Building (later Great Western Savings, now Great Western Jewelry Plaza) 700 S. Hill Street (corner 7th), Curlett and Beelman (1922)

=== 7th & Broadway ===
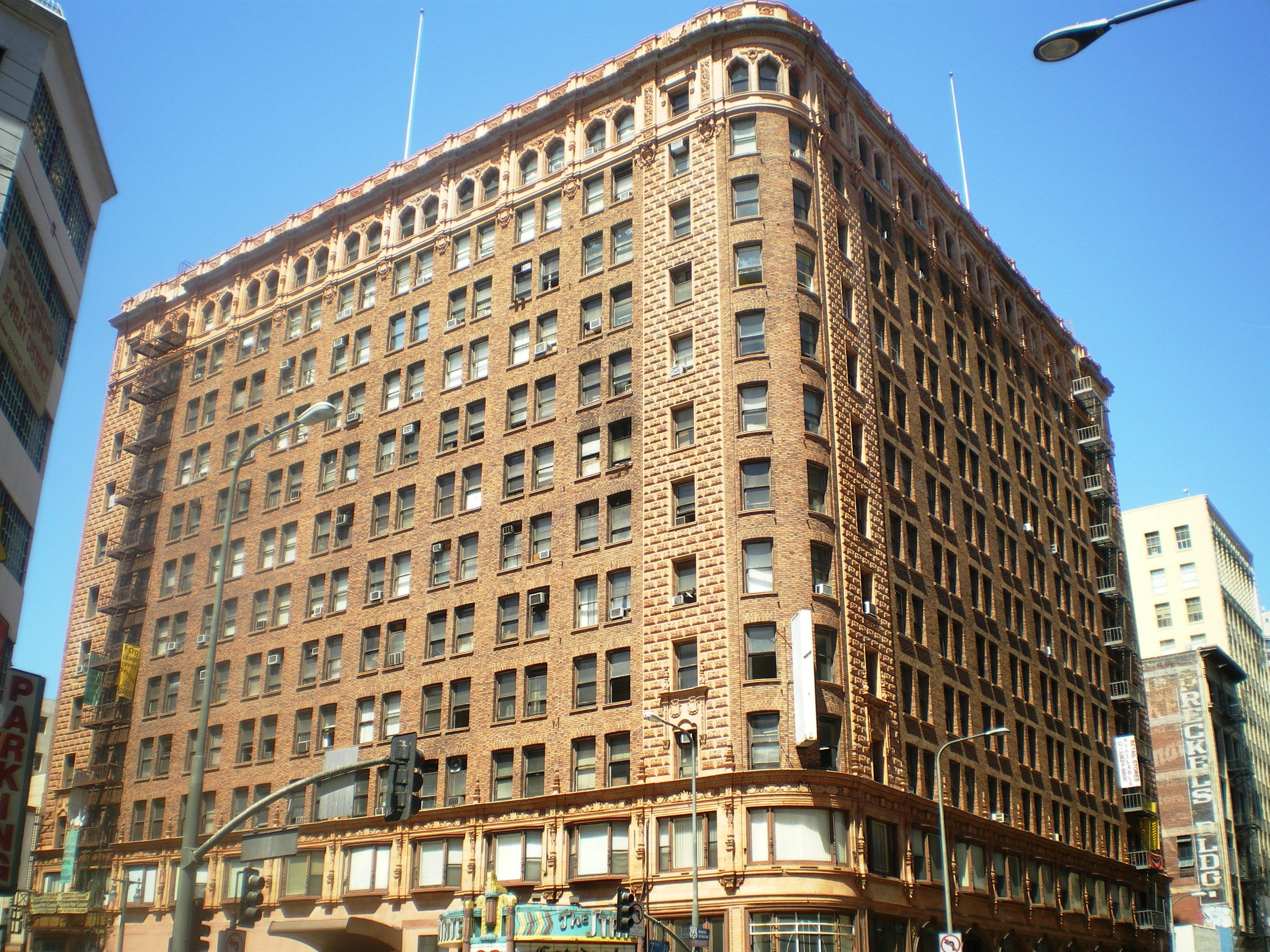
Loew’s State Theatre

- Loew's State Theatre, 300 W. Seventh Street (SW corner of Broadway), Weeks and Day (1921), Los Angeles Historic-Cultural Monument #522/National Register of Historic Places (Broadway Historic Theatre and Commercial District)
- Bullock's complex, National Register of Historic Places, Broadway Historic Theatre and Commercial District, now St. Vincent's Jewelry Center
  - Hart '28, 7th and Hill, Parkinson and Parkinson (1928)
  - Eshman Building, 345 W. Seventh Street, Morgan and Walls (1909)
  - Bullock's Building, 319 W. Seventh Street (NW corner of Broadway), Parkinson and Bergstrom (1906)
- St. Vincent's Court, small alley running through the center of Bullock's complex, built in the 1860s as the main entrance to St. Vincent’s College which occupied the site. In 1956, city boosters remodeled the alley as a faux European village square.
- Western Terminus of Route 66, Seventh Street at Broadway

=== Broadway to Spring ===
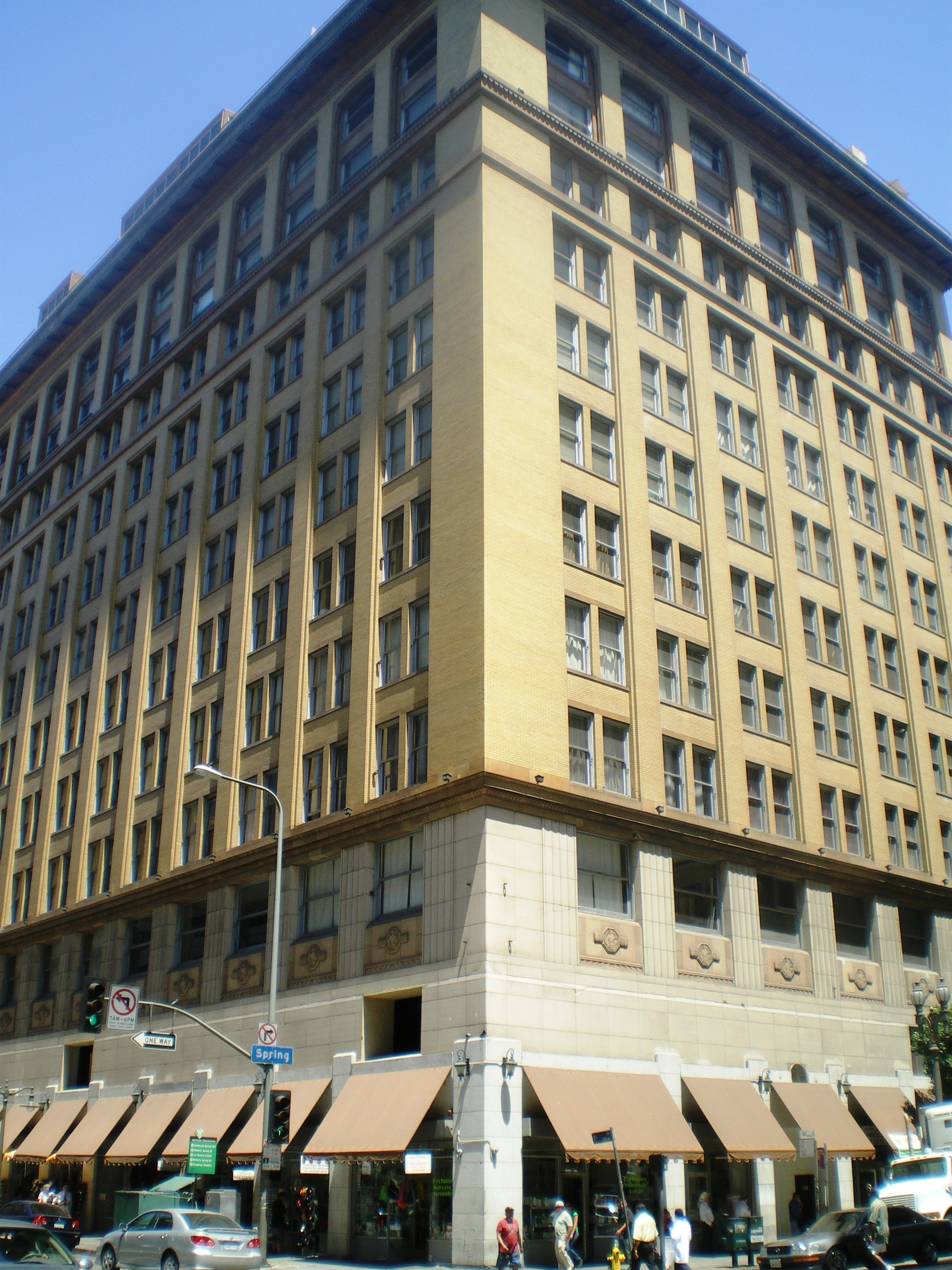
A.G. Bartlett Building

- Haas Building, 219 W. Seventh Street, Morgan, Walls and Morgan (1915), offices, 12 stories, Beaux Arts with terra cotta ornamentation, metal skin added in the 1970s. Now apartments.
- Bartlett Building (Union Oil Building, The Bartlett), 215 W. Seventh Street, Parkinson and Bergstrom (1911), National Register of Historic Places (Spring Street Financial District), Beaux Arts, offices.
- Van Nuys Building (Van Nuys Apartments, 210 W. Seventh Street, Morgan, Walls and Morgan (1911), Los Angeles Historic-Cultural Monument #898, National Register of Historic Places (Spring Street Financial District), since 1982 apartments, Beaux Arts.

=== Spring to Main ===
- Hellman Commercial Trust and Savings Bank, 650 S. Spring Street (corner of 7th), Schultze and Weaver (1925) National Register of Historic Places (Spring Street Financial District), Spanish Revival style. Since 2009, apartments. Former banking lobby serves as event space and filming location.
- Financial Center Building, 140 W. Seventh Street, Norton and Wallis, (1924), National Register of Historic Places (Spring Street Financial District)

=== 7th & Main ===
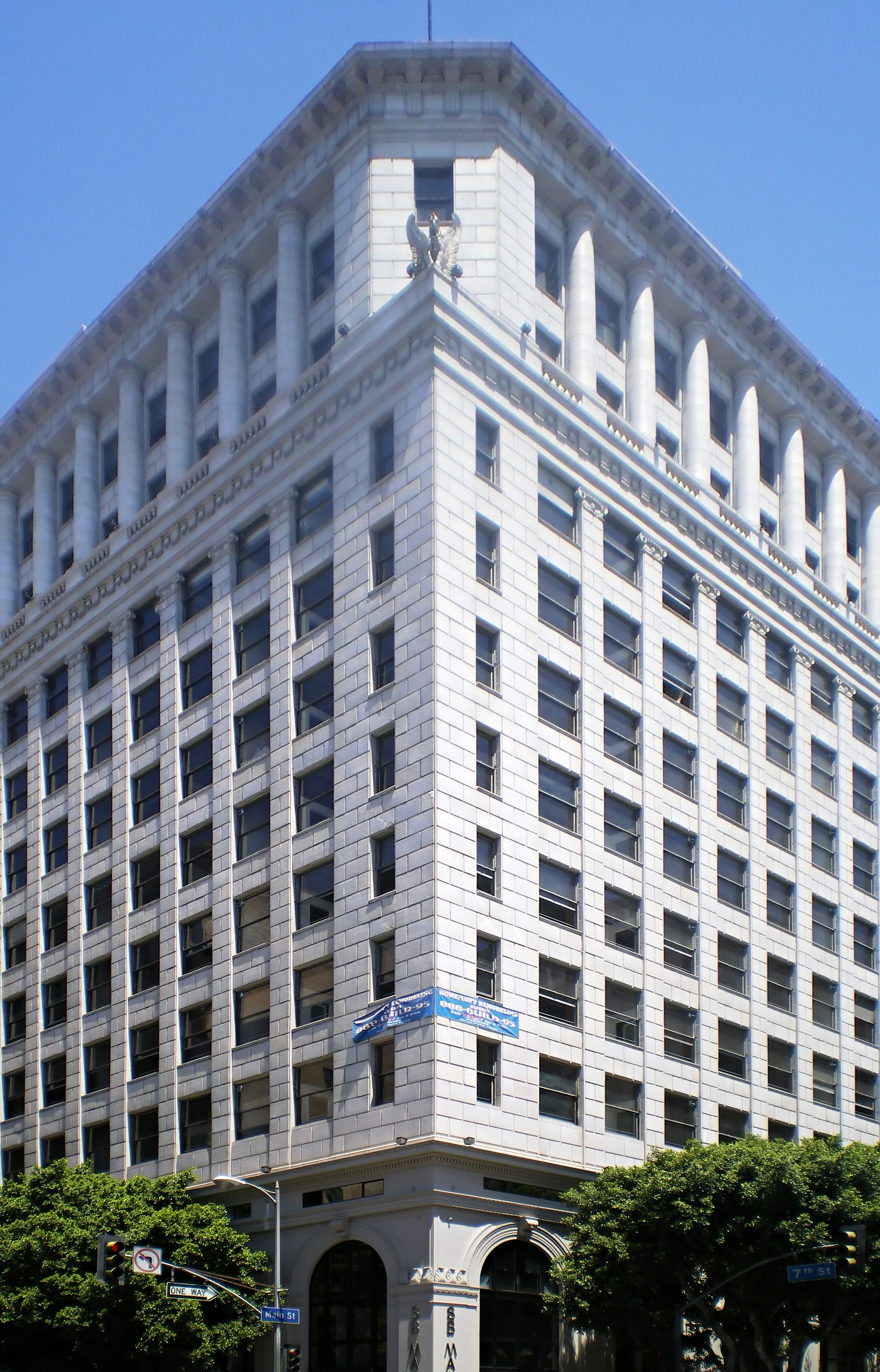
Los Angeles Board of Trade Building

- Los Angeles Board of Trade Building / California Stock Exchange (SW corner 7th/Main), 111 W. Seventh Street, Curlett and Beelman (1926), since 2009, apartments. Winged creatures adorn the building.
- Santee Court, 714, 716, 720, and 724 S. Los Angeles Street, Arthur W. Angel (1911), Los Angeles Historic-Cultural Monument #710. Block of industrial buildings converted (203) to mixed-use (residential, commercial, retail, and arts), facing a courtyard.
- Heywood Bros. & Wakefield / Dearden's Home Furnishings buildings: 700-710 S. Main Street, 1899, Architect unknown (ca. 1899); John Parkinson remodel (ca. 1902); 712-718 S. Main Street, R. B. Young (1901): Now closed, the last incarnation of Dearden's was especially patronized by Latino Angelenos familiar with its Spanish-language advertising, and comprised three buildings, all of which previously housed furniture stores: Heywood Bros. & Wakefield Company (circa 1899) on the corner, which become Overell’s in 1906; Hulse, Bradford & Company (1901) just to the south; and a third industrial structure to the rear.

== Department stores on 7th Street and on Broadway ==
This is a table of the openings of department stores along the 7th Street and Broadway corridors:

Store	Opened	Left	Moved or closed?	Location	Sq ft	Sq m	Architects	Current use
SPRING ST. BETWEEN TEMPLE AND SECOND
Coulter's (1st sequential location)	1884	1898	Moved	SW corner 2nd & Spring (Hollenbeck Block)				Historic Broadway station
Hamburger's (1st seq. loc.)	1888	1908	Moved	Franklin & Spring (Phillips Block)			Burgess J. Reeve	Site of City Hall
Mullen & Bluett	1889	1910	Moved	101–105 N. Spring				Empty lot
Jacoby Bros. (1st seq. loc.)	1891	1900	Moved	128–138 N. Spring at Court				Site of City Hall
The Hub	1896	1916	Moved	Spring at Court (Bullard Block)			Morgan & Walls	Site of City Hall. The Hub moved to 430 S. Broadway.
BROADWAY
Broadway from 2nd to 3rd
Ville de Paris (A. Fusenot Co.)	1893	1898	Moved	221-223 S. Broadway (Potomac Block)			Block, Curlett & Eisen	added to Coulter's late 1907, demolished 1958, now a parking lot
Coulter's (3rd seq. loc.)	1905	1917	Moved	225-229 S. Broadway through to 224-228 S. Hill. 1907: expanded into 219-223 Broadway (Potomac Block)	157,000	14,586	Block, Curlett & Eisen	demolished, site of parking lot
Boston Dry Goods (J.W. Robinson Co.)	1895	1915	Moved	237–241 S. Broadway			Theodore Eisen, Sumner Hunt	Parking lot
I. Magnin/ Myer Siegel (1st seq. loc.)	1899		Moved	251 S. Broadway (Irvine Byrne Block)			Sumner Hunt	Wedding chapel
Broadway from 3rd to 4th
Coulter's (2nd seq. loc.)	1898	1905	Moved	317–325 S. Broadway through to 314–322 Hill St. (Homer Laughlin Building)	86,000		John B. Parkinson	became Ville de Paris; Now Grand Central Market
Ville de Paris (2nd seq. loc.)	1905	1917	Moved.	317–325 S. Broadway through to 314–322 Hill Street (Homer Laughlin Building)	96,000	8919	John B. Parkinson	Grand Central Market
Jacoby Bros. (2nd seq. loc.)	1899	1935–6	Moved	331-335 S. Broadway	60,000	5574	John B. Parkinson	Was "Boston Store" in late 1930s. Currently independent retail. 2 of 4 floors were removed.
J. J. Haggarty; New York Store	1905	1917	Moved	337–339 S. Broadway				Small retail. Only 2 stories remain.
J. M. Hale (Hale's)	1909			341–345 S. Broadway (Karl's Building)			Abram M. Edelman	retail, top floors were removed
Broadway from 4th to 5th
The Broadway (1st seq. loc.)	1896	1973	Moved	SW corner 4th & Broadway, later through to Hill (Broadway Mart Center)	1924, 577,000	53,605	Parkinson and Bergstrom	
Bon Marché		1907	Liquidated	430 S. Broadway (Bumiller Building)			Morgan & Walls	
The Hub (2nd seq. loc.)	1907	1916	Moved	430 S. Broadway (Bumiller Building)			Morgan & Walls	In 1907, The Hub opened at the former Bon Marché. In March 1916, The Hub moved to 337–9 S. Spring. closing in 1922.
Myer Siegel (2nd seq. loc.)	1899		Moved	455 S. Broadway				Became part of Fallas Paredes
Broadway from 5th to 6th
Fifth Street Store (Steele, Faris & Walker), later Walker's	1905		Closed	SW corner 5th & Broadway (Fifth Street Store Building)	1917: 278,640	1917:25,887	Alexander Curlett	Replaced existing store with new building in 1917. Building later housed Ohrbach's
Ohrbach's			Closed	SW corner 5th & Broadway (Fifth Street Store Building)			Alexander Curlett	Former Walker's store. Building later housed Ohrbach's
Silverwoods	1904			556 S. Broadway (NE corner of 6th) (Silverwood's Building)	1920: 115,420	1920: 10,723	Walker & Eisen	Broadway Jewelry Mart
Swelldom	1920	1970s	Closed	555–561 S. Broadway (NW corner of 5th) (Swelldom Building)			Davis & Davis; Henry F. Withey	Small retail
Broadway from 6th to 7th
Jacoby Bros. (3rd seq. loc.)	1936	1938	Liquidated	605 S. Broadway				Became a Zukor's (1940), now mixed-use
Central Dept. Store	1907	1908		609–619 S. Broadway	85,000	7897	Samuel Tilden Norton	Demolished, now site of Los Angeles Theatre
Myer Siegel (3rd seq. loc.)			Moved	617 S. Broadway			Samuel Tilden Norton	Demolished, now site of Los Angeles Theatre
Mullen & Bluett (2nd seq. loc.)	1910	1960s	Moved	610 S. Broadway (Walter P. Story Building)			Morgan, Walls & Clements	Mixed-use
Desmond's	1924	1972	Closed	616 S. Broadway (Desmond's Building)	85,000	7897	A. C. Martin	Renovated 2019 as office space, a restaurant and a rooftop bar.
Harris & Frank; 2nd concurrent location	1947	1980	Closed	644 S. Broadway (J. E. Carr Building)			Robert Brown Young	
Bullock's (1st seq. loc.)	1907	1983	Closed^{b}	NW corner 7th & Broadway by 1934, most of the block 6th/ 7th/ Broadway/ Hill	1907: 350,000; 1934: 806,000	1907: 32,516; 1934: 74,880	Parkinson & Bergstrom	St. Vincents Jewelry Mart
Broadway from 7th to 8th
F.W. Woolworth	1920			719 S. Broadway (Woolworth's Building)			Weeks and Day	Ross Dress for Less
Reich and Lièvre	1917	c.1927		737–745 S. Broadway (Issacs Building)				
Broadway from 8th to 9th
Hamburger's (2nd seq. loc.); After 1925: May Company (1st loc.)	1906	1986	Moved	SW corner 8th & Broadway (May Company Building)	1906: 482,475; 1930, >1,000,000	1906: 44,823, 1930 92,903	Alfred F. Rosenheim	Under renovation to become tech campus
Eastern Columbia	1930	1957		849 S. Broadway through to Hill (Eastern Columbia Building)	1930: 275,650 (expanded in 1950)	1930: 25,609	Claud Beelman	Residential condo
Broadway from 9th to 10th
Blackstone's	1917			901 S. Broadway (SE corner 9th) (Blackstone's Department Store Building)	118,800	11,037	John Parkinson	Building became The Famous, now residential, retail
SEVENTH STREET BETWEEN BROADWAY AND FRANCISCO)
Seventh from Broadway to Hill
Bullock's (see above)
Seventh from Hill to Olive
Ville de Paris, from 1919 B. H. Dyas	1917	1933	Liquidated	420 W. 7th (SE corner Olive)			Dodd and Richards	L.A. Jewelry Mart
Seventh from Olive to Grand
Haggarty's	1917	1963	Closed	520–530 W. 7th at Grand (Brockman Building)			George D. Barnett, Barnett, Haynes & Barnett	Apartments
Coulter's (4th seq. loc.)	1917	1938	Moved	500 W. 7th (SW corner Olive)			Dodd and Richards	Mixed-use. Coulter's moved to Miracle Mile.
Seventh from Grand to Hope
J. W. Robinson's (2nd seq. loc.)	1915	1993	Closed	600 W. 7th (7th, Hope & Grand)	1915: 400,000; 1923: 623,700 sq ft (57,940 m^{2})	1915: 37,161; 1923: 57,944	Noonan & Richards (1915), Edgar Mayberry/Allison & Allison (1934 remodel)	Mixed-use
Desmond's 7th St. (2nd seq. loc.)	1934, expanded 1937		Closed	617 W. 7th. St. (2nd Union Oil Building)	22,500 (1937)	2090	Alexander Curlett and Claude Beelman	Walgreens
Seventh from Hope to Flower
The Broadway (2nd loc.), later Macy's	1973	Open	Open	750 W. 7th (Hope to Flower) (Broadway Plaza)	250,000	23,226	Charles Luckman	In operation
Desmond's 7th St. (1st seq. loc.) (B'way store remained open)	1927	1934	Moved	717 W. 7th St. (Roosevelt Building)			Alexander Curlett and Claude Beelman	Shoo Shoo Baby (restaurant)
Barker Bros. (final downtown loc.)	1926	1984	Closed	818 W. 7th (Flower to Figueroa)	1,000,000	93,000	Curlett and Beelman	Offices
Seventh from Figueroa to Francisco
Bullock's (2nd seq. loc.), later Macy's	1986	1996	Closed	735 S. Figueroa (Seventh Market Place)			Jon Jerde	Gold's Gym (level M1), Target (M2), Zara (M3)
May Company (2nd seq. loc.), later Macy's	1986	2009^{a}	Closed	735 S. Figueroa (Seventh Market Place)			Jon Jerde	Nordstrom Rack (level M1), Target (M2), H&M (M3)
FLOWER STREET FROM SEVENTH TO EIGHTH
Weatherby-Kayser shoes	1925			715–719 S. Flower				
Myer Siegel (4th seq. loc.)	1927			733 S. Flower				
Parmelee-Dohrmann (homewares)	1927			741–747 S. Flower				

^{a}as Macy's, ^{b}reopened in 1986 at Citicorp Plaza, now FIGat7th.

== Flower Street shopping district ==
For a time in the 1920s, Flower Street one block north and south of 7th, was an upscale shopping district. It began with the establishment of Chappell's at 645 S. Flower, which moved there from 7th Street in 1921 into a two-story, Spanish-style building, which exuded intimacy and tranquility compared to busy 7th Street or Broadway. It was innovative in offering parking in the rear.

Barker Brothers opened their huge furniture emporium at 7th and Flower in 1926, two blocks west of J. W. Robinson's, which was already considered far west of the main Broadway shopping district. Myer Siegel followed a half block south, on Flower, that same year, as did Parmelee-Dohrmann, a large purveyor of china, crystal and silver. Other stores were Ashley & Evers, Ranschoff's, and Wetherby-Kayser shoes.

By 1931 Flower's heyday had petered out due to the depression, the opening of Bullock's Wilshire (1929) and I. Magnin (1939) much further west on Wilshire Blvd., as Myer Siegel's 1934 move to 7th Street.
