= Bartlett Building =

Bartlett Building may refer to:

- Bartlett Building (Cincinnati)
- Bartlett Building (Los Angeles)
- Bartlett Building (University College, London)
