= Davis Building (Los Angeles, California) =

Building in Los Angeles, California, U.S.

- U.S. Historic district – Contributing property
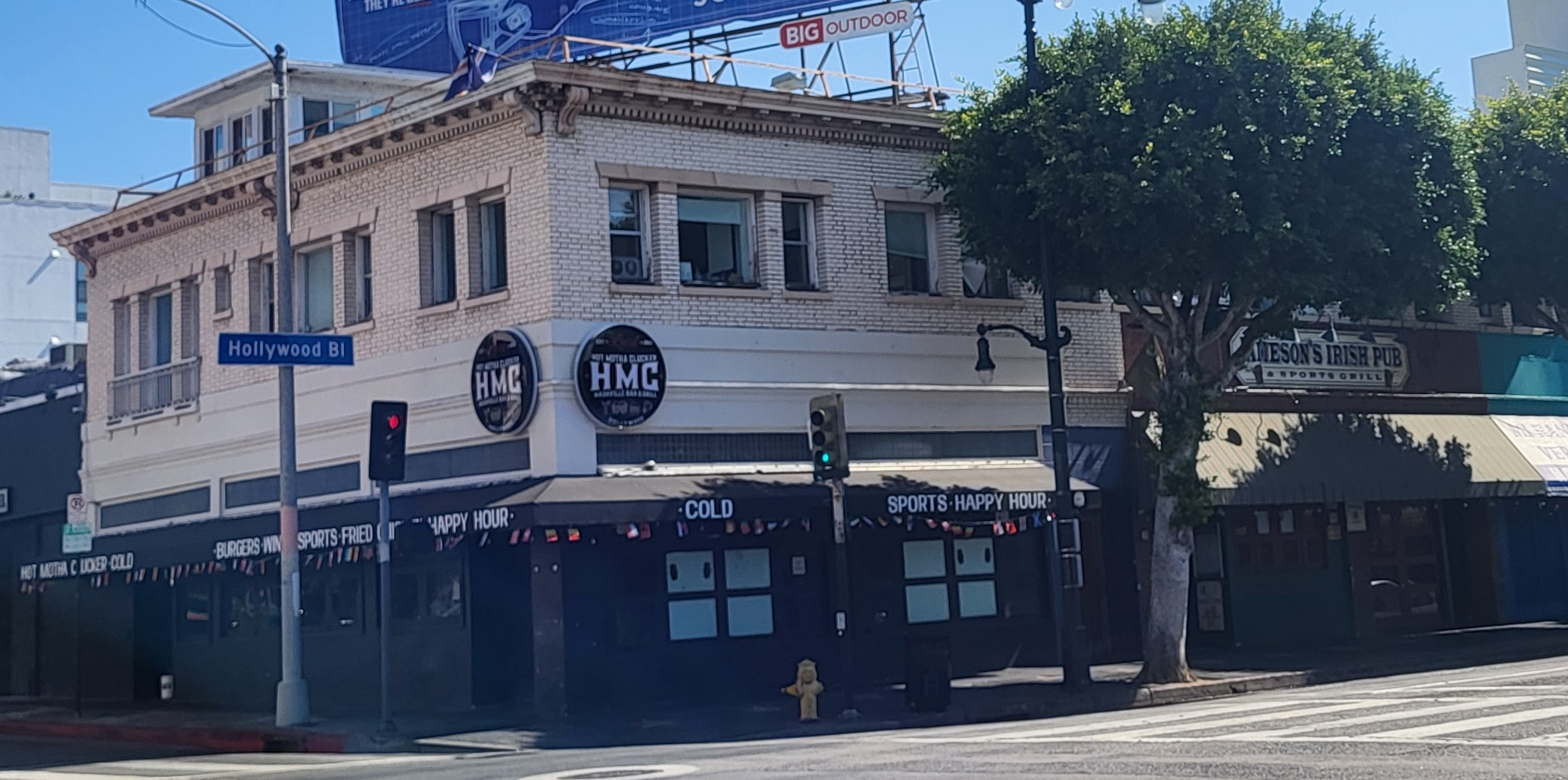
- The building in 2024

- Location within the Los Angeles metropolitan area
- Location: 6679-89 W. Hollywood Blvd., Hollywood, California
- Coordinates: 34.102°N 118.336°W
- Built: 1914 or 1925
- Architect: F. L. Paulson
- Architectural style: Beaux Arts, Vernacular
- Part of: Hollywood Boulevard Commercial and Entertainment District (ID85000704)
- Designated CP: April 4, 1985

Davis Building is a historic two-story building at 6679-89 W. Hollywood Boulevard, on the corner of Hollywood Boulevard and Las Palmas Avenue, in Hollywood, California. It is a contributing property in the Hollywood Boulevard Commercial and Entertainment District.

== History ==
Davis Building was designed by F. L. Paulson and built in 1914. Various retail stores occupied the building in its early years, notably a branch of Myers Siegel opened here in 1925 and Transcontinental & Western Air moved into the building in 1932. A hotel also occupied the building in 1925 and John F. Kennedy's Hollywood campaign headquarters was located in the building in 1960.

In 1985, the Hollywood Boulevard Commercial and Entertainment District was added to the National Register of Historic Places, with 6679 Hollywood Boulevard listed as a contributing property in the district.

In 1998 the building was sold for $2.25 million ($4.44 million in 2025), and in 2007, it was sold for $3 million ($4.66 million in 2025).

== Architecture and design ==
Davis Building is built of brick and features a simplified Beaux Arts Vernacular style that contains a stringcourse separating the first and second stories, upper story windows grouped in twos and threes, and is capped by a heavy classical cornice supported by scroll brackets.

== See also ==
- List of contributing properties in the Hollywood Boulevard Commercial and Entertainment District
