= Bank of Italy Building (Los Angeles) =

Building in Los Angeles, California

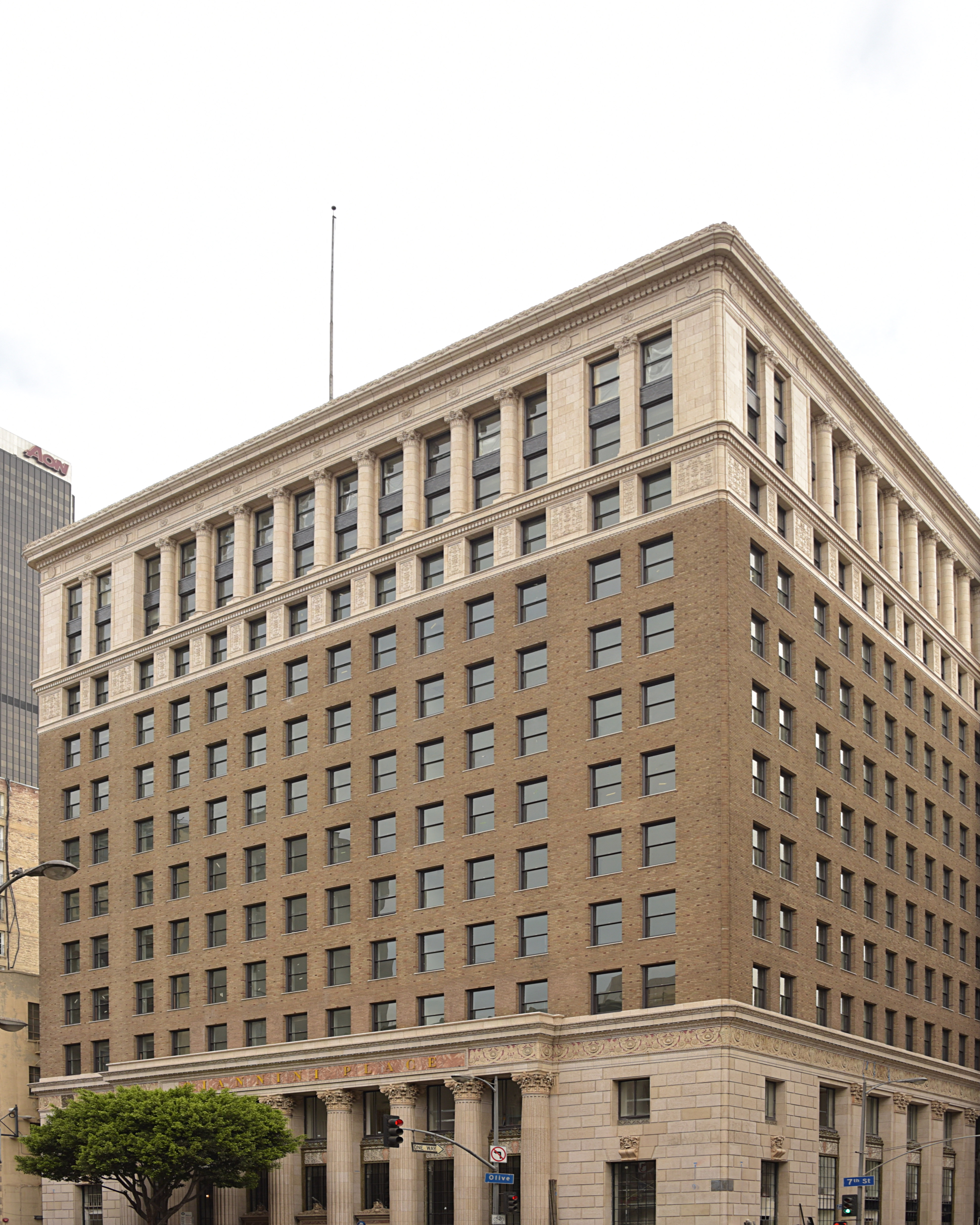

General information
- Architectural style: Neoclassical
- Location: 649 South Olive Street, Los Angeles, California, United States
- Coordinates: 34.04692°N 118.25568°W
- Completed: 1922
- Cost: $34,000,000
- Owner: Sydell Group

Height
- Roof: 194ft

Technical details
- Floor count: 12

Design and construction
- Architect: Morgan, Walls & Clements
- Bank of Italy Building
- U.S. National Register of Historic Places
- Area: less than one acre
- NRHP reference No.: 100004191
- Added to NRHP: July 19, 2019

The Bank of Italy Building is a historic building in Los Angeles, California, United States, known for many years as Giannini Place. It was converted to a hotel in 2018 and currently operates as Hotel Per La.

== Location ==
The building is located on the corner of 7th Street and Olive Street in Downtown Los Angeles.

== History ==
The 12-story building was completed in 1922, and it was dedicated in 1923. It was built as the Los Angeles headquarters of the Bank of Italy, a forerunner to Bank of America founded by Amadeo Giannini. It was designed by the architectural firm Morgan, Walls & Clements, in the Neoclassical architectural style with "Doric columns, ornate golden ceiling and marble floors." The bronze front doors are surrounded by terra cotta sculptures of American coins.

It belonged to the Chetrit Group, until it was acquired by the Sydell Group for US$39 million. From 2015 to 2017, the building was remodeled into the NoMad Los Angeles Hotel, with additional investments from billionaire Ronald Burkle. The hotel opened in 2018, but closed in 2020, due to the COVID-19 pandemic. It reopened in 2022 as the Hotel Per La.
