= Parmelee-Dohrmann =

American luxury items store chain

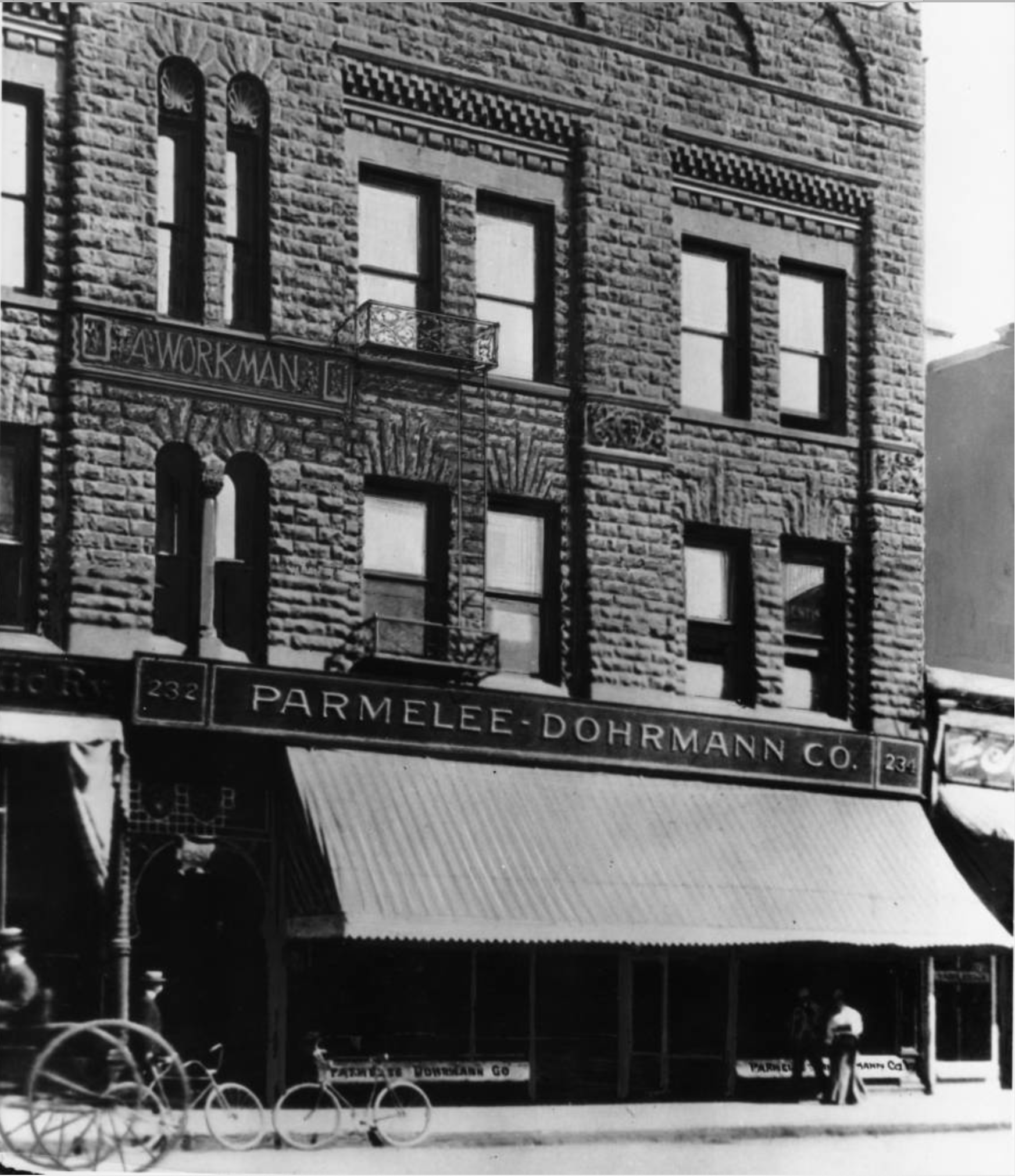
Parmelee-Dohrmann store at the Workman Block, 232–234 S. Spring St., c. 1900–1906

Parmelee-Dohrmann was a Los Angeles–based chain of stores that sold fine china, crystal, glassware, silver, and objects of art.

The store dated back to 1878, when it occupied an adobe building near the Los Angeles Plaza.

On June 17, 1899, Parmelee and Dohrmann opened the "China Hall" store at the Workman Block, 232–234 S. Spring Street—at that time they also carried appliances like stoves and refrigerators.

Throughout 1906, the company held several grand opening events to celebrate its new 70,000-square-foot (6,500 m^{2}) flagship store, occupying five floors of a new eight-story building at 436–444 S. Broadway, which had by then become the city's busiest retail district. The store was designed by Morgan & Walls. In addition to tabletop and home decoration, the store sold art. The store was described as the finest of its kind west of New York. It featured an innovation, pneumatic tubes for processing sales transactions between the sales floor and the cashiers' area.

In 1927 it moved to the new upscale shopping area around West Seventh Street that took place after J. W. Robinson's moved to Seventh, Hope and Grand in 1917. Its new quarters were at 741–747 S. Flower Street, also not far from Myer Siegel and Barker Brothers.

The Los Angeles Times described the company, once it had moved to its new Flower Street store, as the largest china, crystal and silver retail organization in the world at the time, with fifteen stores in total.

In March 1933, the Los Angeles Flower Street flagship and Pasadena branch were closed and a joint venture was set up with upscale department store Bullock's whereby a "Bullock's Parmelee Dohrmann" opened inside Bullock's flagship store at Seventh and Broadway in Downtown Los Angeles. It took up the entire seventh floor and sold "dinnerware, glassware, kitchen utensils, refrigerators, ranges, and washing machines".

The Dohrmann bought Parmelee out and in the 1950s the remaining stores' names were changed to Dohrmann's.

The San Francisco 76,000-square-foot (7,100 m^{2}) Union Square store was demolished in 1967 and Macy's constructed a building on the site that would become part of the complex of the Macy's Union Square store.

Dohrmann's was bought by the Broadway-Hale Corporation which would, in 1995, become part of Federated Department Stores, which itself was later renamed Macy's, Inc.
