= Haggarty's =

Former American department store chain

- Industry: Department store
- Founded: 1905
- Defunct: 1970
- Fate: Bankruptcy
- Headquarters: Los Angeles
- Area served: Los Angeles

Haggarty's (also J. J. Haggarty, the New York Cloak and Suit House, the New York Store) was a department store chain founded in Los Angeles in 1906, which closed in May 1970 due to not keeping up with fashion trends and a resulting $4.4 million in debts. It had more than a dozen branches at its peak.

== History ==
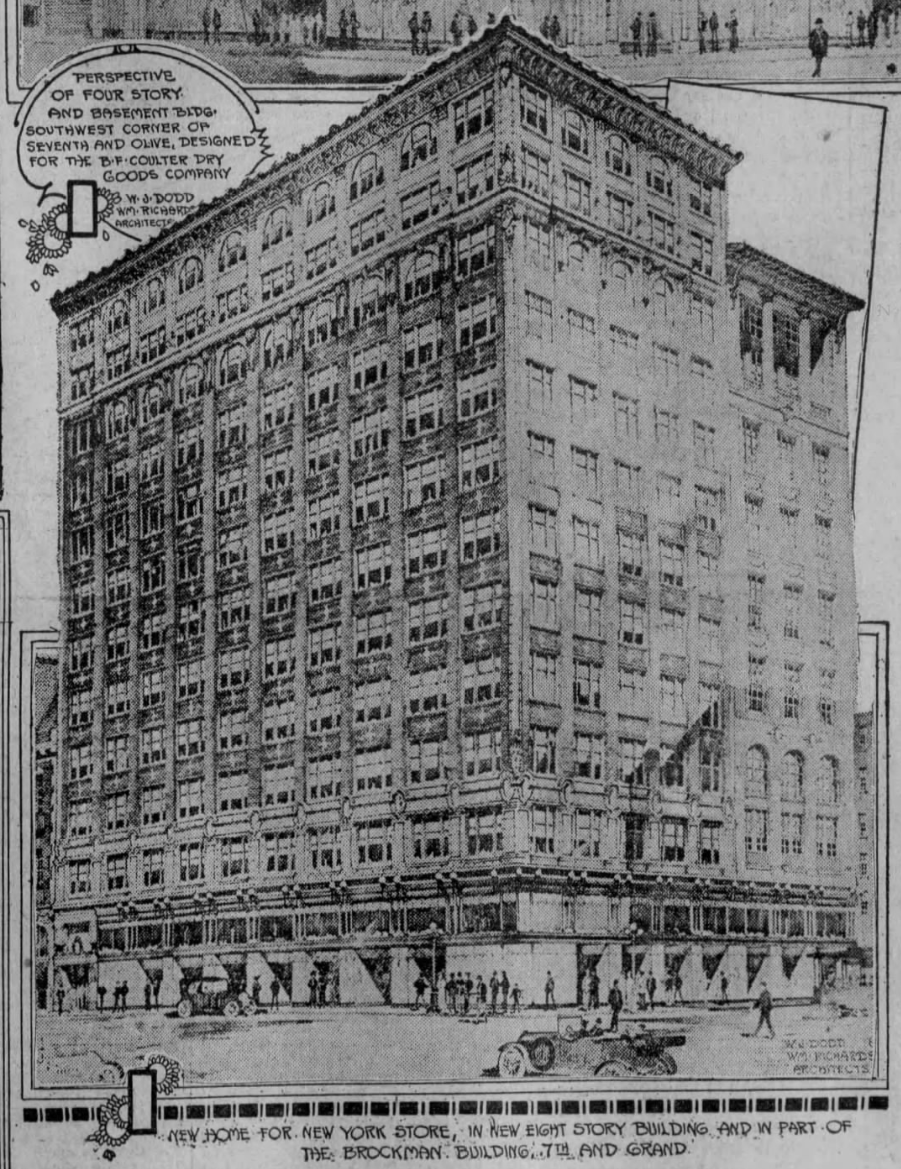
Haggarty's new New York Cloak and Suit store on Seventh Street in the Brockman Building, sketch from November 1918

The chain was founded by J. J. Haggarty (1860–1935) who by 1905 had served for three and a half years and department manager and buyer for Jacoby Bros. department store, when he decided to open his own store, the New York Cloak and Suit House, occupying what had been the location of the City of London store at 337-339 S. Broadway. The store opened March 6, 1905, and was decidedly upscale, positioning itself as a large specialty store carrying ladies', misses' and children's ready-to-wear. It had four stories, each furnished in a different color scheme; first floor: fancy goods; second floor: evening gowns, opera wraps, cloaks, suits and skirts; third floor: millinery, dressmaking parlors and art; fourth floor: café and restaurant.

On September 20, 1917, he opened his "vision", a "large uptown store" at the southeast corner of West Seventh Street, which since 1915 had become the upscale shopping district downtown, at the corner of Grand Avenue, dropping the New York Cloak and Suit name and using simply J. J. Haggarty Inc. The store occupied the ground floor of two buildings: both the main building (now called the Brockman Building) and an adjacent new four-story structure. The store had a 350-foot-long series of display windows under an arcade, the first such feature of a retail store in Los Angeles. store at 337-9 Broadway was occupied by the self-service New York Dresseteria, then later, Sweet Sixteen.

After Mr. Haggarty's death the chain was bought by Clyde H. DeAcres, who had been president of Sherman, Clay and Co. in San Francisco, retailers of musical instruments. In 1938, DeAcres opened a four-story branch store in Beverly Hills on Wilshire Boulevard near Rodeo Drive.

At the time of the chain's demise the principal owner was Mrs. Lila M. Ash, the wife of Roy Ash, the president of Litton Industries, a large defense contractor. She had invested about $9.5 million in Haggarty's.

== Branches ==
Shortly before bankruptcy in 1970, the chain operated locations in Beverly Hills (the lease on which was acquired by Roos-Atkins), Pasadena, Palm Springs, Downey, Canoga Park, and four Hafter's-Haggarty's shops in the San Diego area. Previous branches in existence were Santa Ana and Bakersfield. The Downtown Seventh and Grand store had closed in 1963.

== Other ==
Mr. Haggarty built a mansion in the West Adams district of Los Angeles at 3330 West Adams Blvd., and a 32-room Mediterranean-style, $750,000 summer home (1928) on the Palos Verdes Peninsula at 415 Paseo del Mar, near Malaga Cove, with lawns and gardens designed by the Olmsted Brothers and furnishings from Italy.
