= Roosevelt Building =

- U.S. National Register of Historic Places
- Los Angeles Historic-Cultural Monument
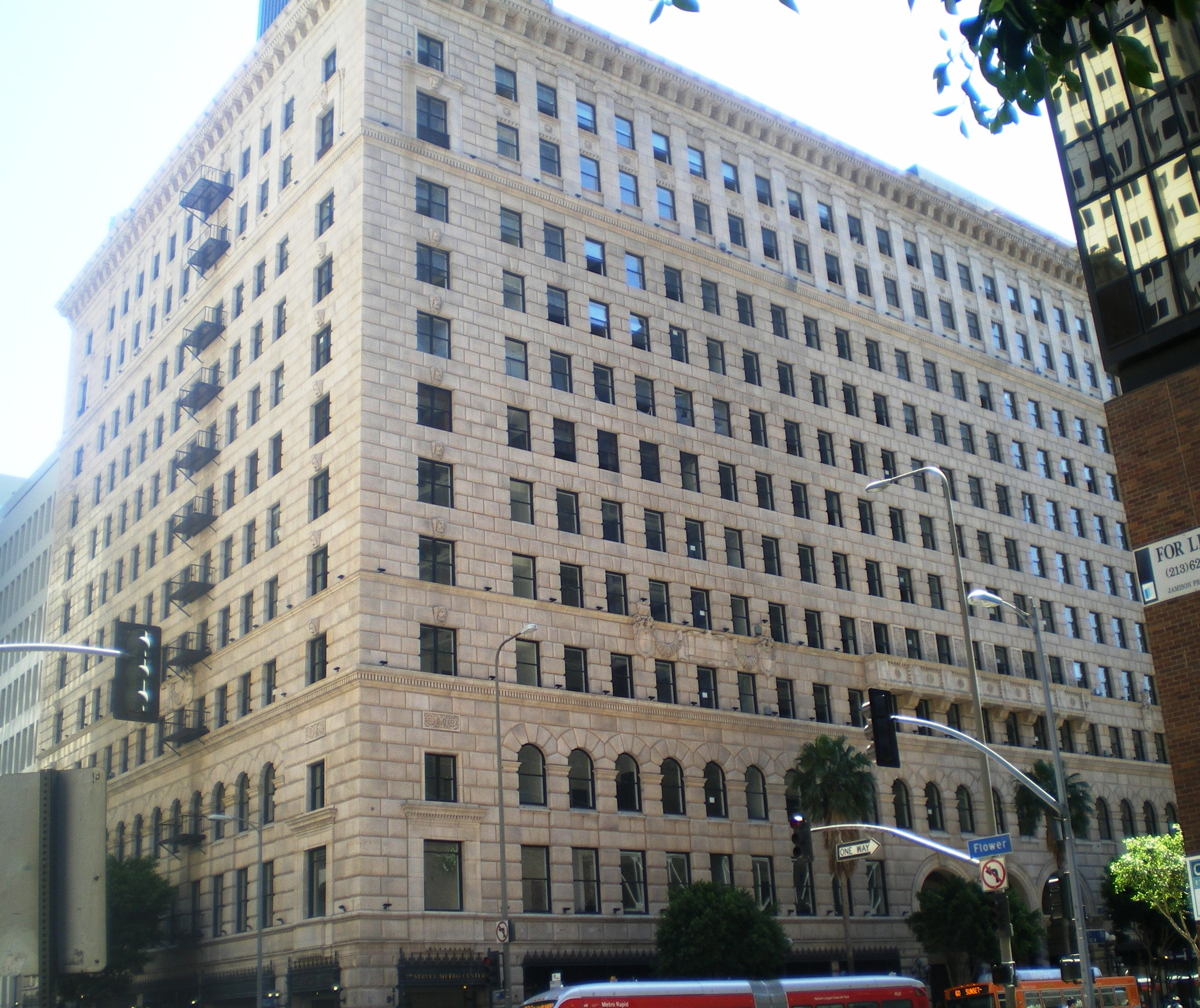
- Roosevelt Building, 2008

- Location within the Los Angeles metropolitan area Location within California Location within the United States
- Location: 727 W. Seventh St., Los Angeles, California
- Coordinates: 34.04866°N 118.25818°W
- Area: less than one acre
- Built: 1926
- Architect: Claud Beelman, Alexander Curlett
- Architectural style: Italian Renaissance Revival
- NRHP reference No.: 07000636
- LAHCM No.: 355
- Added to NRHP: July 3, 2007

The Roosevelt Building is a high-rise residential building located along 7th Street in Downtown Los Angeles. It was completed in 1926 and was designed by Claude Beelman and Alexander Curlett in an Italian Renaissance Revival style. It was later converted to lofts.

In 2007, the building was listed on the National Register of Historic Places.

It is a 12-story building with an E-shaped plan, with light wells on the interior of the block. The Seventh Street facade is about 250 feet (76 m) long and the Flower Street facade is about 137 feet (42 m). These facades are faced with off-white terra cotta made to look like rusticated stone blocks, which were manufactured by Gladding, McBean & Company.

The building was constructed by the J. V. McNeil Company who constructed several of the high-rises in Los Angeles at this time.

It is a three-part commercial structure, with a base, a shaft and a capital, consistent with Italian Renaissance Revival style.

It was deemed notable as "an excellent example of the Italian Renaissance Revival style as well as for its association with the distinguished architecture firm of Curlett & Beelman." It was built with "high quality materials and exceptional craftsmanship" and is one of the outstanding examples of Italian Renaissance Revival architecture in Los Angeles."

== See also ==
- List of Registered Historic Places in Los Angeles
