= Brockman Building =

- Brockman Building and New York; Cloak and Suit House (annex)
- U.S. National Register of Historic Places
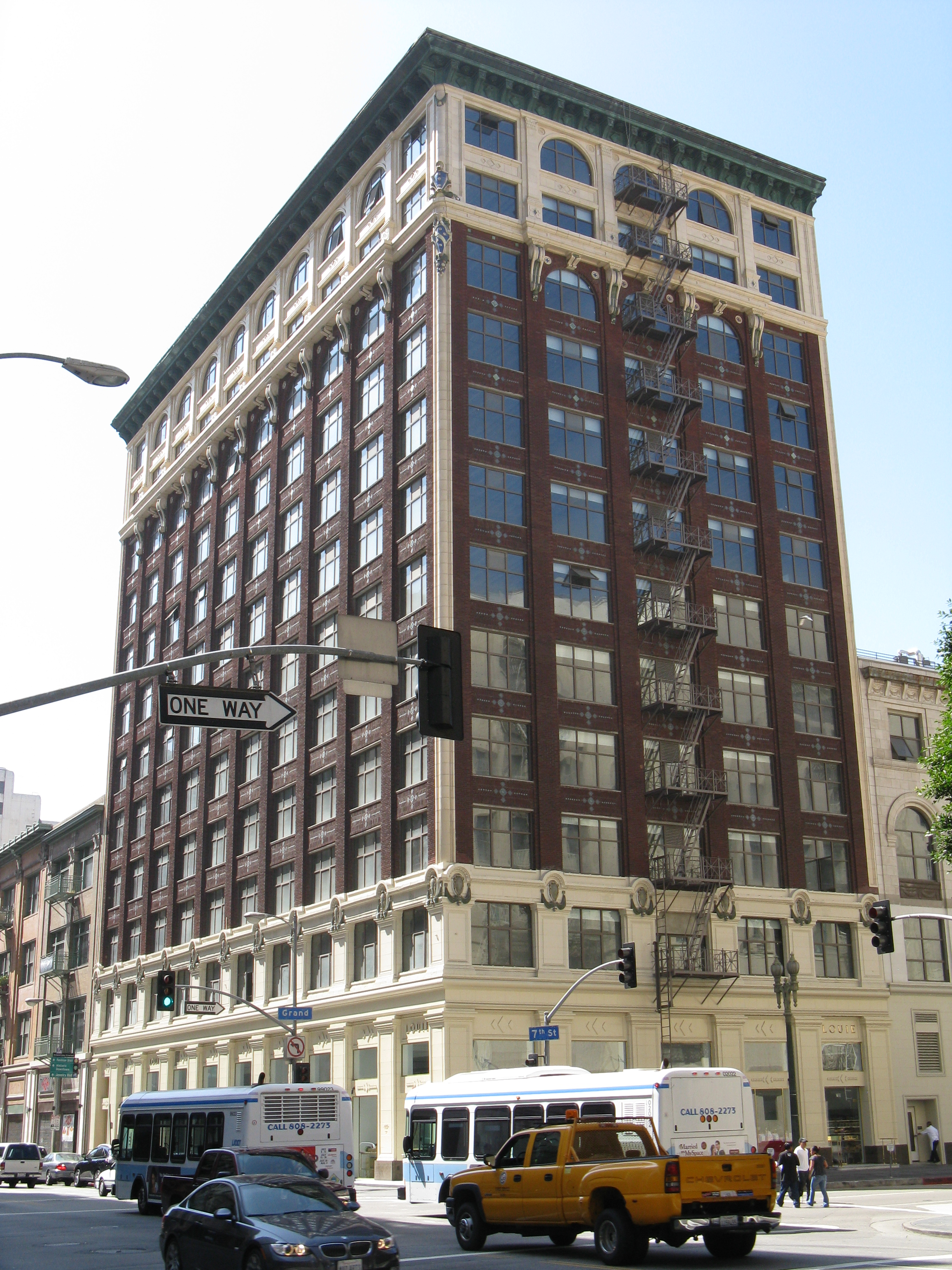
- Brockman Building (2009)

- Location within the Los Angeles metropolitan area Location within California Location within the United States
- Location: 520−530 W. 7th St., Los Angeles, California
- Coordinates: 34°02′49.07″N 118°15′23.14″W
- Built: 1912
- Architect: Barnett, Haynes & Barnett
- Architectural style: Beaux-Arts, Classical Revival, Romanesque Revival,
- NRHP reference No.: 08001276
- Added to NRHP: May 21, 2009

The Brockman Building is a 12-story Beaux-Arts, Classical, and Romanesque Revival style building located on 7th Street in Downtown Los Angeles.

== History ==
Built in 1912, the Brockman Building was listed on the National Register of Historic Places in 2009. The building was built in 1912 for John Brockman (1841-1925) and designed by George D. Barnett (1863-c. 1925) of Barnett, Haynes & Barnett. The Brockman Building was the first building west of the Broadway Commercial District to reach the city's 150-foot height limit. Brockman's move started a westward movement of the downtown commercial district and turned Seventh Street into the city's high-end retail district. Several department stores (including the original J.W. Robinson Co.) and office buildings were developed along Seventh Street after the Brockman Building was completed.

In 1917 J. J. Haggarty, a large department store-style apparel retailer moved from Broadway to occupy the ground floor.

=== Role in the film Safety Last! ===
The roof of the Brockman Building was used for the 1923 Harold Lloyd film, Safety Last!, but the Brockman itself is not seen in the movie, but rather, the ten-floor International Savings & Exchange Bank Building at Spring and Temple. Although the two buildings look nothing alike, this erroneous understanding has appeared in numerous sources, including The Los Angeles Times, Daily Variety, Los Angeles Business Journal, and countless real estate websites.

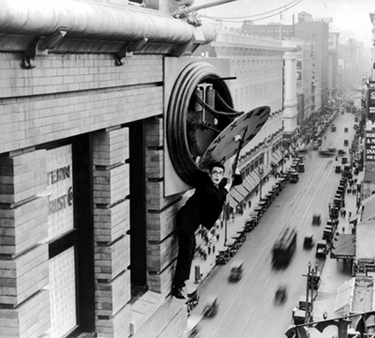
Replica of the International Savings Building’s façade as seen in Safety Last!

The International Savings Building was used for all of the long shots showing Lloyd’s character scaling its exterior. Medium and close shots were executed using a full-scale replica of two floors of the International Savings Building’s façade, placed on a platform on the rooftop of the L. L. Burns Western Costume Co. building at 908 S. Broadway – making it appear that Lloyd’s character was hanging up to 12 stories over the sidewalk. (A similar method was used for 1921’s Terror Trail, wherein a building façade was reconstructed over the Hill Street Tunnel to give an illusion of grand height on film – while actually being only a story and a half above a solid surface.)

The International Savings Building is seen clearly in a large photograph (showing a stuntman climbing it for Safety Last!) on page 140 of the book, Hollywood – The Pioneers by Kevin Brownlow (Alfred A. Knopf, New York, 1979).

=== Adaptive reuse ===
The Brockman Building was converted into an 80-unit condominium project from 2006 to 2008, however the building's owner filed for bankruptcy protection before the project was completed. The building was owned by Bank of America until April 2012, when it was purchased by Simpson Housing LLC of Denver, in what was reported as "the second highest price-per-unit sale in Downtown Los Angeles’ history." There were reportedly 26 offers for the building.

Renamed the Brockman Lofts, they are now luxury rental apartments with largely-finished 'loft interiors.'

The Bottega Louie restaurant has operated on the building's ground floor since 2009.

== See also ==
- Buildings and structures in Downtown Los Angeles
- National Register of Historic Places listings in Los Angeles, California
