= Bottega Louie =

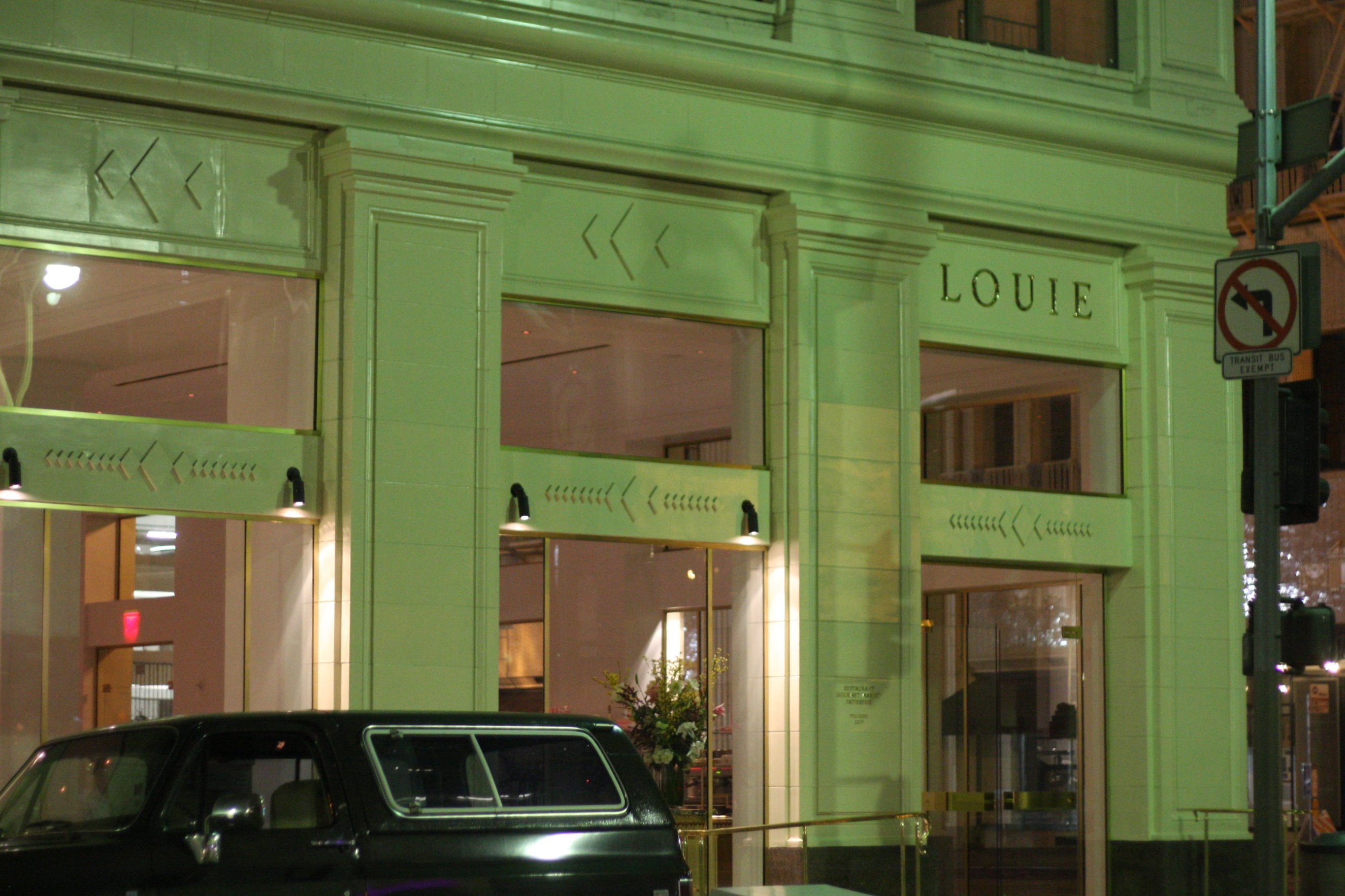
- Interactive map of Bottega Louie

Restaurant information
- Established: April 6, 2009
- Dress code: Casual
- Location: 700 S. Grand Ave., Los Angeles, California, 90017, United States
- Coordinates: 34.0469°N 118.2565°W
- Website: Official Website

Bottega Louie is an Italian restaurant, gourmet market, and French patisserie located on the ground floor of the Brockman Building in Downtown Los Angeles.

The restaurant is known for its open kitchen and menu of pastas, salads, small plates, pizza, and pastries. In addition, Bottega Louie runs a gourmet market where patrons can purchase packaged foods including confections, chocolates, pasta sauces, dry pastas and preserves.

Bottega Louie opened in 2009. It has over 400 employees and serves about 15,000 guests a week in its dining room and adjoining gourmet market.

== Location ==
Bottega Louie is located in the Brockman Building and is credited with creating Downtown Los Angeles's "Restaurant Row." This particular area of Downtown Los Angeles underwent a rapid expansion of bars, restaurants and residences from 2012 to 2014 that some real estate developers are calling a "7th Street Renaissance." Bottega Louie is also an integral part of the Downtown Center Business Improvement District.

== Accolades ==
- 2016 – Most Reviewed Business, Most Photogenic Business
- 2014 – Most Photogenic Business
- 2011 – Most Popular Restaurant

== See also ==
- List of Italian restaurants
