= Bartlett Building (Los Angeles) =

Historic building in Los Angeles, California

- U.S. Historic district – Contributing property
- Los Angeles Historic-Cultural Monument
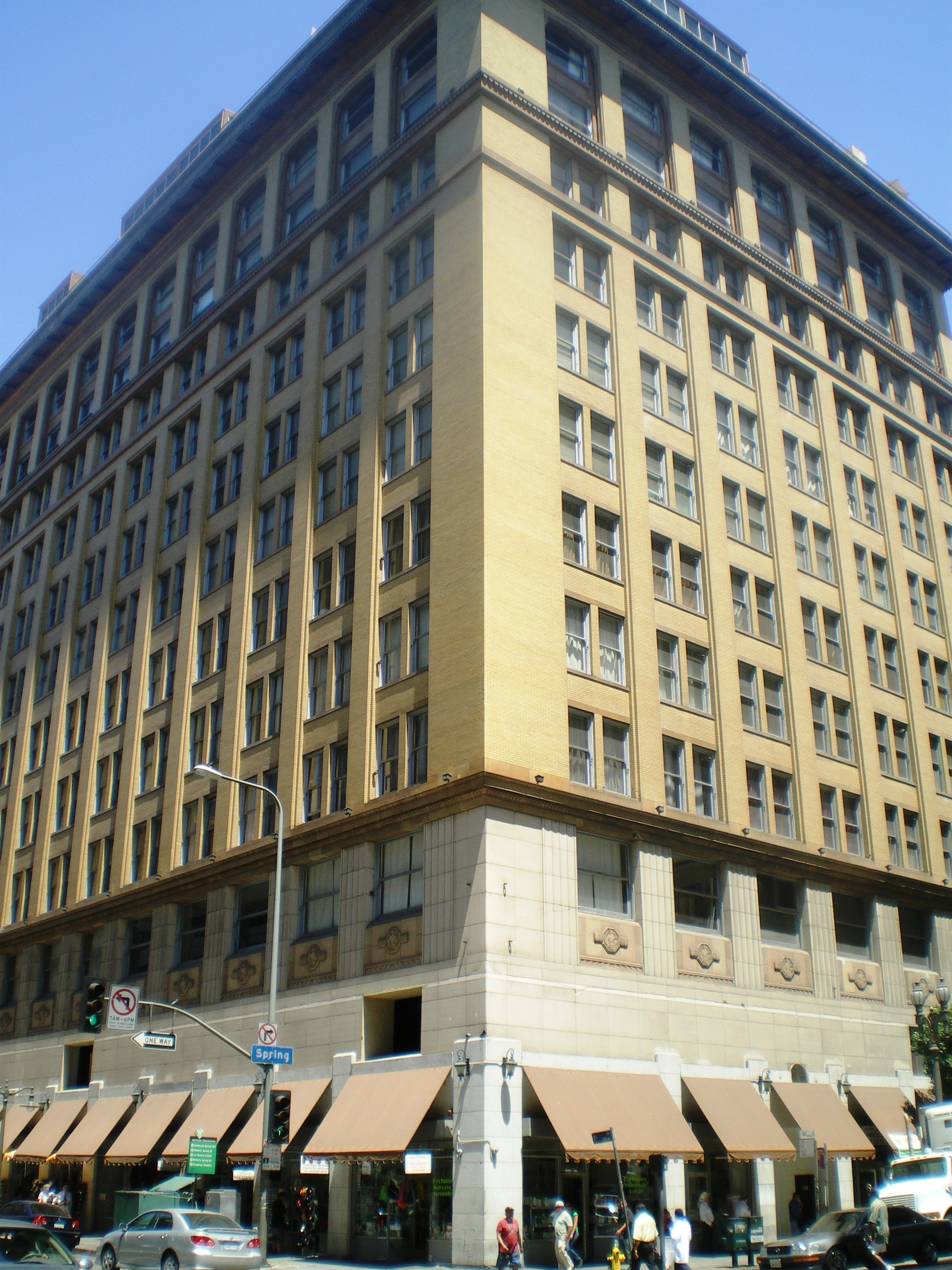
- The building in 2008

- Location within the Los Angeles metropolitan area
- Location: 651 S. Spring Street and 215 W. Seventh Street, Los Angeles, California, United States
- Coordinates: 34.0446°N 118.2517°W
- Built: 1911
- Architects: John B. Parkinson; George Bergstrom
- Architectural style: Commercial Style/Beaux Arts
- Part of: Spring Street Financial District (ID79000489)
- LAHCM No.: 1089

Significant dates
- Designated CP: August 10, 1979
- Designated LAHCM: May 13, 2015

Bartlett Building, also known as A.G. Bartlett Building, Union Oil Building, and The Bartlett, is a historic building located at 651 S. Spring Street and 215 W. Seventh Street in downtown Los Angeles, California. It is a contributing property in the Spring Street Financial District.

== History ==
Bartlett Building was designed by John B. Parkinson and George Bergstrom and built in 1911. The building, the first of several Union Oil Buildings, was the tallest in Los Angeles for five years. It was bought by Albert Griffin Bartlett in 1921 and served as the served as Union Oil Company's headquarters until 1923, and many smaller oil companies also rented offices in the building, including George Getty-owned Minnehoma Oil Company. Southwestern Law School also started in the building in 1911.

The exterior of the building's bottom three stories was remodeled in 1937. In 1979, the Spring Street Financial District was added to the National Register of Historic Places, with Bartlett Building listed as a contributing property in the district.

Real estate developer Barry Shy bought Bartlett Building for $5 million in 2001 ($9.09 million in 2025). The building was converted to residential the following year; the cost of the conversion was estimated to be $8 million ($14.3 million in 2025). In 2011, developer Andrew Meieran acquired all of the building's ground floor commercial space, approximately 40,000 square feet (3,700 m^{2}), from Shy in a legal settlement.

Bartlett Building was designated Los Angeles Historic Cultural Monument No. 1089 on May 13, 2015. It is also a contributing property in the City of Los Angeles recognized Seventh Street Commercial Historic District.

== Architecture and design ==
The United States Department of the Interior describe Bartlett Building as having a Commercial Style design, while other sources describe the design as Beaux Arts. The building is U-shaped, features white terra cotta, and it has been described as having ten, eleven, and fourteen stories. The exterior of the building's bottom three stories was remodeled in the Moderne style in 1937.

== See also ==
- List of contributing properties in the Spring Street Financial District
