= Reich and Lièvre =

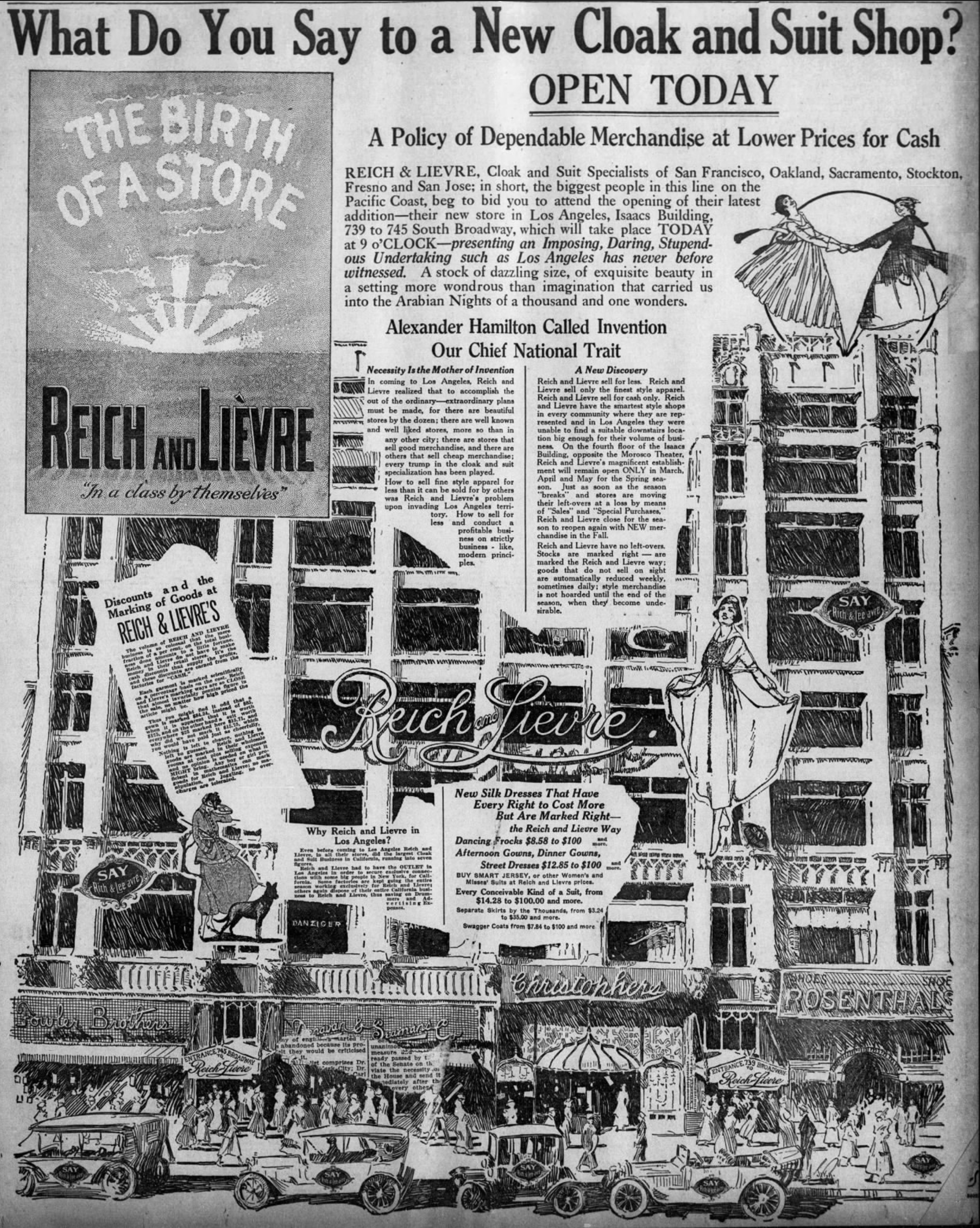
Reich and Lièvre ad for 1917 Los Angeles store opening

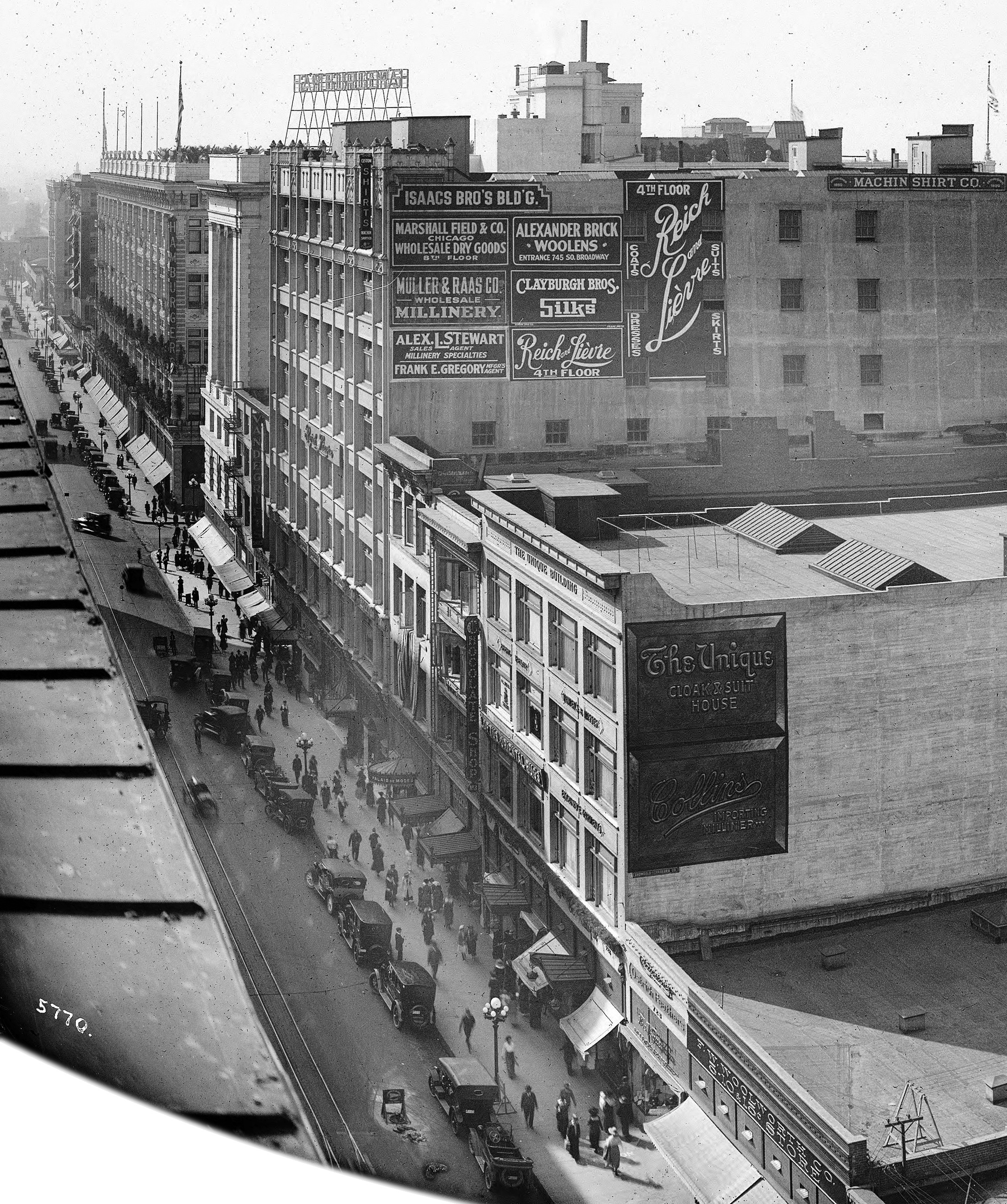
Broadway looking south from 7th Street in 1917. The prominent Reich and Lièvre sign is the rightmost one on the Isaac Bros. Bldg.

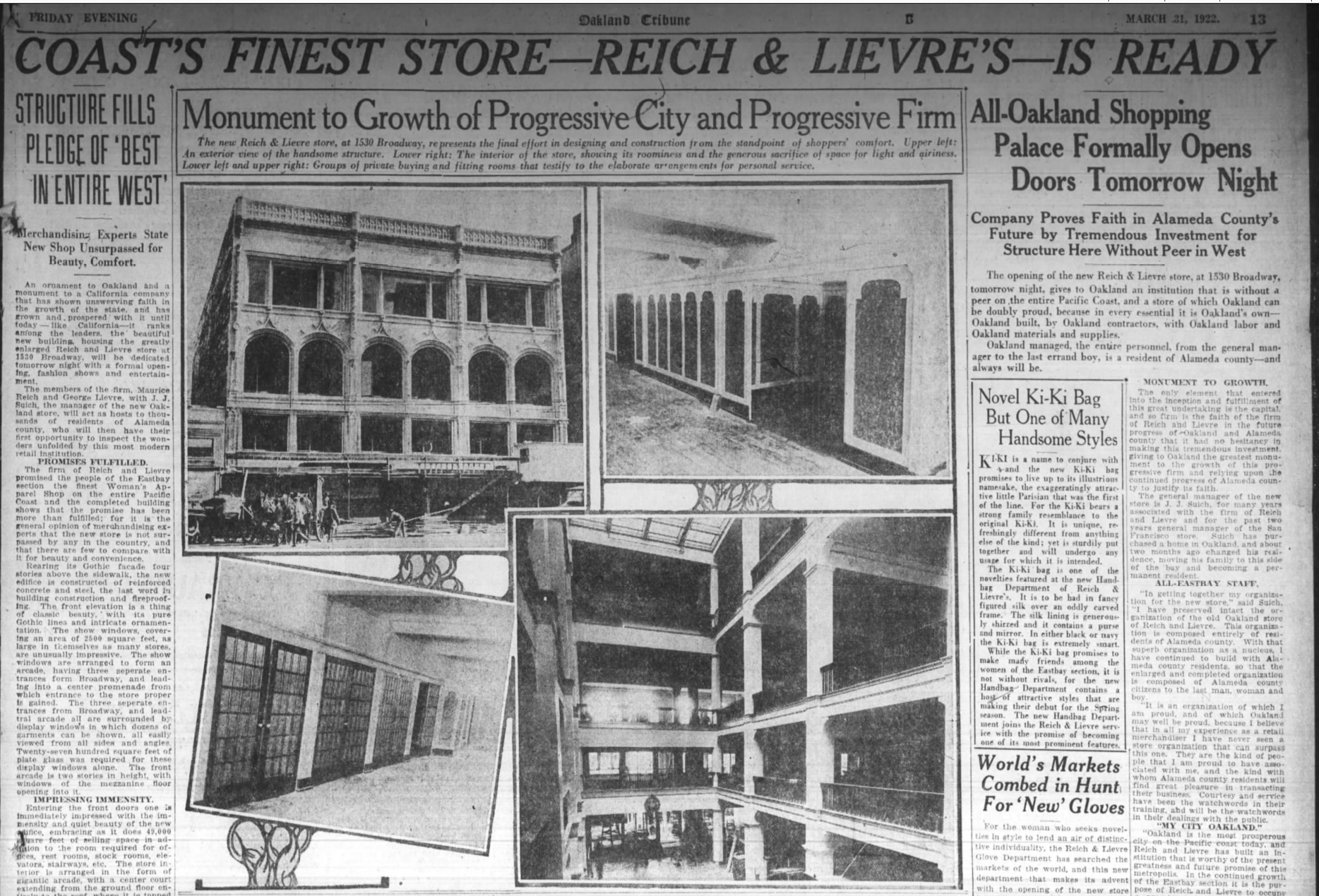
Reich and Lièvre ad for 1922 Oakland store opening

Reich and Lièvre was a chain of stores across California in the early 1900s, focusing on upscale women's apparel, a format known at the time as "cloak and suit shops". Founded by Maurice Reich and real estate broker George Lièvre and based in San Francisco, it had multiple branch locations in that city as well as Oakland (1530 Broadway), San José, Sacramento (808 K St.), Stockton, Fresno, Los Angeles and San Diego.

In 1920, Mr. Reich bought out Mr. Lièvre, but the name was kept.

== Locations ==
The Los Angeles store was located at the Issacs Building, 737-745 S. Broadway.

In Oakland, an expanded store opened in a dedicated, luxurious new building 1922. The architect was William Knowles.

In Sacramento, too Reich and Lièvre was considered a leading women's fashion store along with Weinstock's.

== Product lines ==
As of 1922, the Oakland store, for example carried (for women) gowns, suits, wraps, coats, dresses, informal frocks, millinery, hosiery, veiling, neckwear, handkerchiefs, underwear, petticoats, blouses and sweaters, as well as in new departments sports apparel, shoes, jewelry, handbags, gloves and corsets. The store also carried infants' wear, children's wear, and housed a beauty shop.

== Epilogue ==
The retailer went out of business in 1927. The four-story, 50,000-square-foot (4,600 m^{2}) Oakland store became a branch of the Bedell chain.

In San Francisco, the 51 Stockton St. store near Union Square became Reich's.

Reich's grandson, Jay Rich, as of a 1982 report, ran a chain of Rich's Women's Apparel stores in Sacramento, Carmichael, Yuba City and Roseville, California.
