= Issacs Building =

Building in Los Angeles, California

- U.S. Historic district – Contributing property
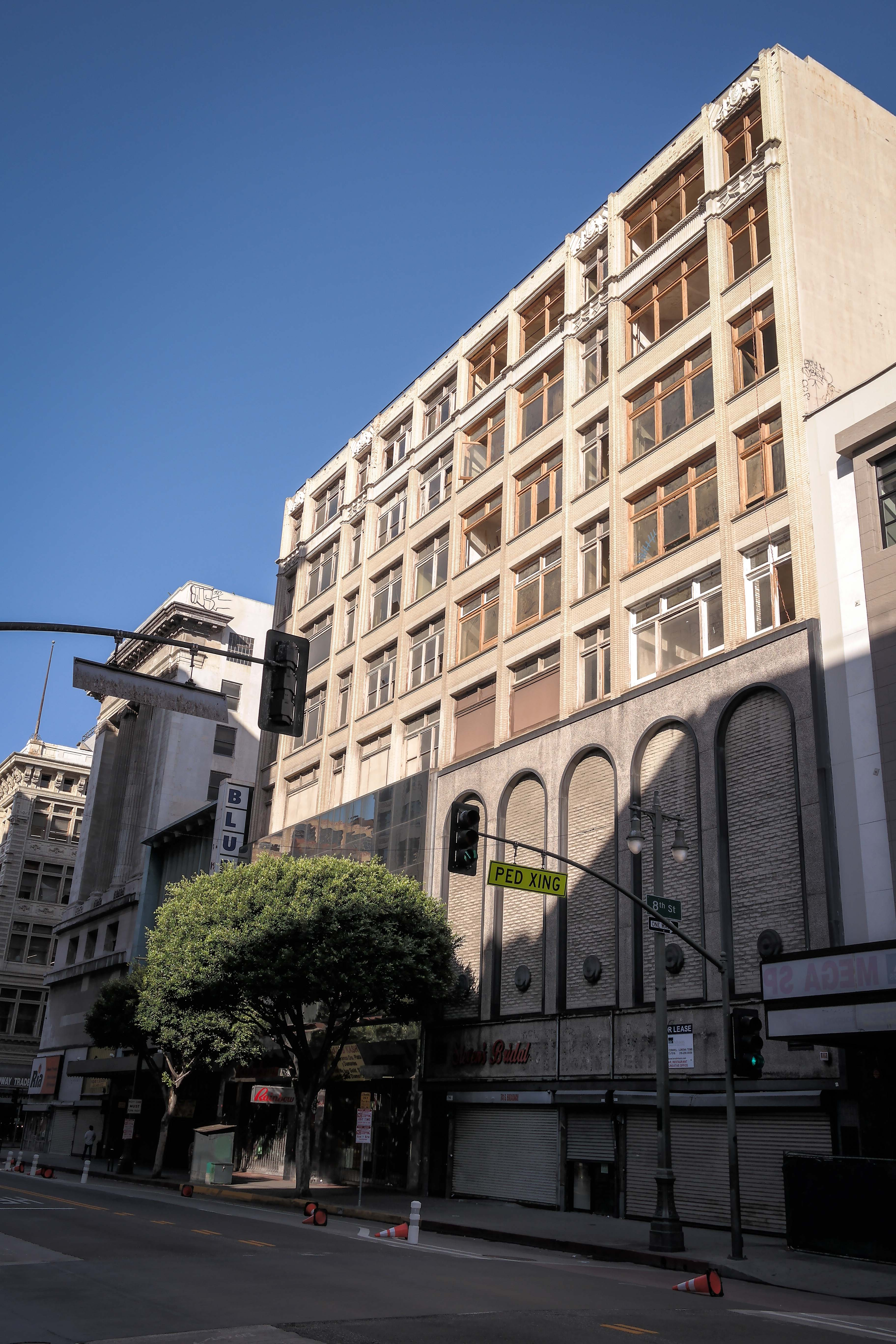
- The building in 2014

- Location within the Los Angeles metropolitan area
- Location: 737-747 S. Broadway, Los Angeles, California
- Coordinates: 34°02′41″N 118°15′16″W
- Built: 1913
- Part of: Broadway Theater and Commercial District (ID79000484)
- Designated CP: May 9, 1979

Issacs Building is a historic eight-story office building located at 737-747 S. Broadway in the Jewelry District and Broadway Theater District in the historic core of downtown Los Angeles.

== History ==
Issacs Building was built in 1913 and it housed a Reich and Lièvre in 1917. In 1979, when the Broadway Theater and Commercial District was added to the National Register of Historic Places, Issacs Building was listed as a contributing property in the district.

In 2022, Issacs Building was put up for sale for $20.5 million ($22.6 million in 2025) but it did not sell. The following year, the building was put up for auction with a starting bid of $4 million ($4.23 million in 2025).

The building is a significant contributor to Sneaker Row, which emerged in the area in the 2010s.

== Architecture and design ==
Issacs Building is made of concrete with a glazed and molded terra cotta facade. The building features Gothic detailing and a large facade covers most of the northern half of the front of the building.

== See also ==
- List of contributing properties in the Broadway Theater and Commercial District
