= Myer Siegel =

General information
- Location: Los Angeles, California

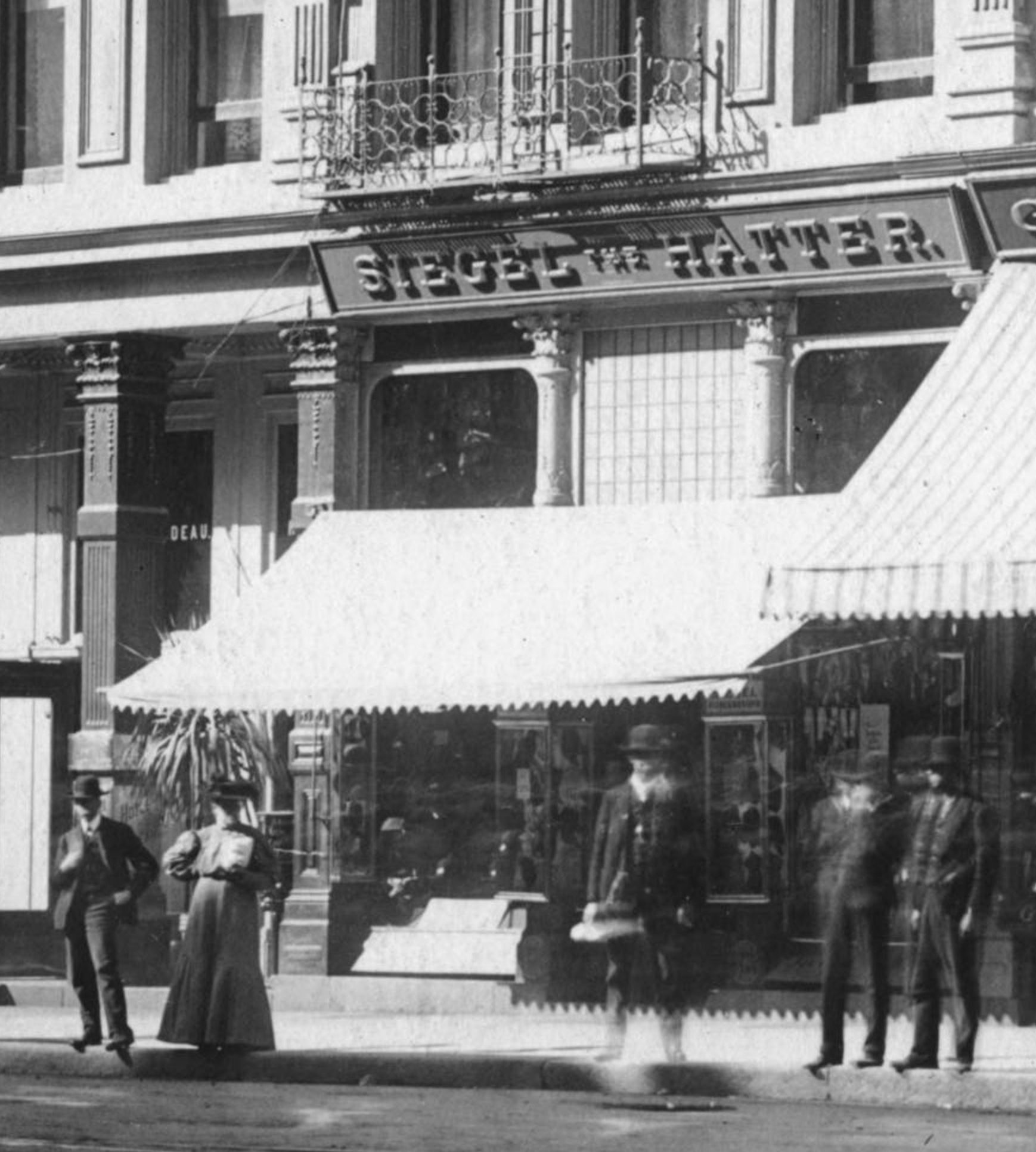
Siegel the Hatter on Spring Street W side just S of First, Nadeau Block about 1905

Myer Siegel was a Los Angeles–based department store, founded by Myer Siegel (1866–1934), specializing in women's clothing.

== History ==
Myer Siegel established his store in 1886 at 218 N. Spring St., at that time selling only children's wear and lingerie. On April 7, 1896, Siegel married Flora Magnin, daughter of I. Magnin, the San Francisco fine clothing maker and retailer. In 1897 and 1898, I. Magnin & Co., manufacturers, advertised its wares for sale at 237 S. Spring St., noting Myer Siegel as the manager.

The I. Magnin store that Siegel managed moved to the Irvine Byrne Building at 251 S. Broadway on January 2, 1899.

=== First Myer Siegel location ===
On June 19, 1904, I. Magnin announced that the Los Angeles store would henceforth be known as "Myer Siegel".

=== Second sequential location ===
After a fire at the Irvine Byrne Building destroyed its store on February 16, 1911, and reopened a new store at the former quarters of the Brockton Shoe store at 455 S. Broadway. The location was later a J. J. Newberry variety store, and later, from 1996 through 2022, part of the Fallas Paredes department store (the store also included the ground floor of the Metropolitan Building to the immediate south, on the northwest corner of Fifth and Broadway).

=== Third sequential location ===
In 1922, Myer Siegel moved again, merging with the firm Seymour's, and moving into its quarters (part of the former Central Department Store) building, at 617-619 S. Broadway.

=== Branches ===
As 1927 began, Myer, Siegel & Co. was operating four stores:

- Downtown Los Angeles, 617–9 S. Broadway, (opened c.1922)
- Pasadena, 440 E. Colorado Blvd. at Los Robles (opened 1922)
- Fresno in the T. W. Paterson Building at Tulare and Fulton (opened September 14, 1925)
- Hollywood, 6687 Hollywood Boulevard at Las Palmas (opened November 7, 1925)

=== Fourth sequential downtown location ===
That year, it built a moved from Broadway to a new $500,000, 6-story-plus-basement, 64,000-sq-ft building, designed by architects Felchin, Shaw & Franklin. It was located at 733 S. Flower Street, just south of Seventh Street, after upscale J. W. Robinson's opened up its giant 400,000-square-foot (37,000 m^{2}) (eventually 623,700-square-foot (57,940 m^{2})) flagship along 7th between Hope and Grand in 1915, and as more upscale shops such as Desmond's, Coulter's, and many smaller boutiques were also moving to the district.

=== Fifth sequential location ===
By 1934, the company moved to 7th and Olive, the former quarters of retailer B. H. Dyas and Co. By that time the company had, in addition to its downtown flagship, branches in Pasadena, Hollywood and on Wilshire Boulevard in Miracle Mile.

=== Miracle Mile store ===
Its Miracle Mile store at what is now known as the Dominguez-Wilshire Building at 5400–10 Wilshire Boulevard, is considered a landmark by the Los Angeles Conservancy and was renovated in 2000. It had many elements that were innovative at the time: air-cooled fitting rooms, aluminum furniture, exotic woods, metalwork and terrazzo floors. It was financed by and named for the Dominguez family, who received one of the original Spanish land grants in 1784.

=== Westwood store ===
Later in December 1937, a branch opened at 1025 Westwood Boulevard in Westwood, Los Angeles designed by Allen Siple. The University of California photo archives notes: "The large glass brick panel above the marquee allowed light to enter the mezzanine, and marble wainscoting flanked the entrance which was paved in travertine. This building is still standing."
