= Zukor's =

Defunct US women's clothing retailer

Zukor's was a U.S. chain of women's clothing stores, specializing in dresses. The company was part of a broader trend of dress shops that catered to middle-class and upper-middle-class women, offering stylish, ready-to-wear fashion at accessible prices.

Benjamin Zukor established the business in 1914 in New York City, starting with a modest shop that specialized in women's apparel. Around a year later, Zukor opened a second New York store.

West Coast stores that Zukor opened were in order:

- Seattle, c. 1927
- Long Beach, California
- Oakland, California, c. 1929, 1311 Washington Street, expanded in 1934 at a cost of $75,000 (equivalent to $1,762,873 in 2024).

and between 1929 and 1934 in:

- Bellingham, Washington
- Portland, Oregon
- Sacramento at 812 K Street
- San Francisco
- San Jose, California
- San Diego
- Los Angeles (2 stores, including one at 611 S. Broadway, opened in February 1931, moving two doors down in 1940 to the H. Jevne & Co. Building at 601–5 S. Broadway)
- Spokane, Washington (1929, Mohawk Building, moved to the Jamieson Building in 1935. Closed c. 1967)

By 1934, the Oakland Tribune described the chain as a five-million-dollar "national institution" that had "served millions of patrons".

The chain opened its fourteenth West Coast store in Fresno, California in 1936 at 1018 Fulton Street at a cost of $50,000 (equivalent to $1,132,974 in 2024).
