= Fifth Street Store Building =

Building in Los Angeles, California

- Fifth Street Store
- U.S. Historic district – Contributing property
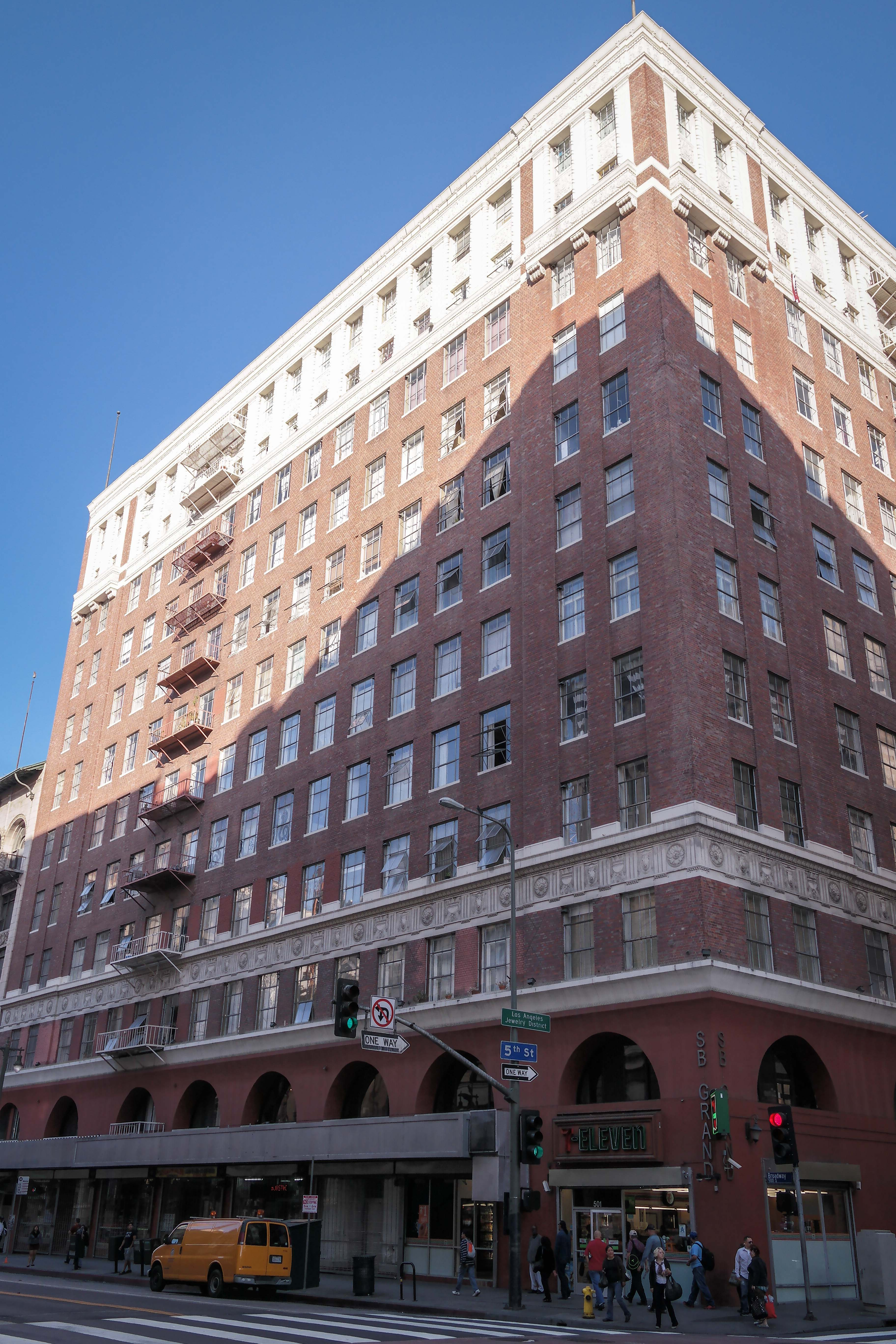
- The building in 2014

- Location within the Los Angeles metropolitan area
- Location: 501-515 S. Broadway and 302-312 W. 5th Street, Los Angeles, California
- Coordinates: 34°02′53″N 118°15′03″W
- Built: 1927
- Architect: Alexander Curlett
- Part of: Broadway Theater and Commercial District (ID79000484)
- Designated CP: May 9, 1979

The Fifth Street Store building, also known as Shybary Grand Lofts, is a historic eleven-story highrise located at 501-515 S. Broadway and 302-312 W. 5th Street in the Jewelry District and Broadway Theater District in the historic core of downtown Los Angeles.

== History ==
Downtown Los Angeles's Fifth Street Store Building was designed by Alexander Curlett and built by Milliron's in 1927. In the building's early years, it was home to a department store that repeatedly changed its name, including Walker's, Fifth Street Store, Walker's Fifth Street Store, and in 1946 it changed to Milliron's. A $300,000 ($4.95 million in 2025) renovation was done in 1946 as well.

In 1952, Ohrbach bought Milliron's, after which they performed a $1 million ($12.1 million in 2025) Welton Beckett-designed modernization on this building. Ohrbach's moved into the building the following year and in 1959, the company sold the building to Starrett Corp. for $2.8 million ($30.9 million in 2025).

In 1979, the Broadway Theater and Commercial District was added to the National Register of Historic Places, with Fifth Street Store listed as a contributing property in the district.

The building was converted to residential in 2006.

== Architecture and design ==
The Fifth Street Store building was built on a steel frame with brick filler walls and concrete floors, and also features a brick and terra cotta facade. The building was built to the height limit in place in Los Angeles at the time it was constructed.

== See also ==
- List of contributing properties in the Broadway Theater and Commercial District
