= Union Oil Building =

Union Oil Building may refer to:

- Union Oil Company Building, Santa Paula, California, the company's birthplace
- Bartlett Building, Los Angeles, California, the first Union Oil Building
- The second Union Oil Building (1923), located at 617 W. 7th Street, Los Angeles, California
- Unocal Building, Los Angeles, California
