= History of retail in Southern California =

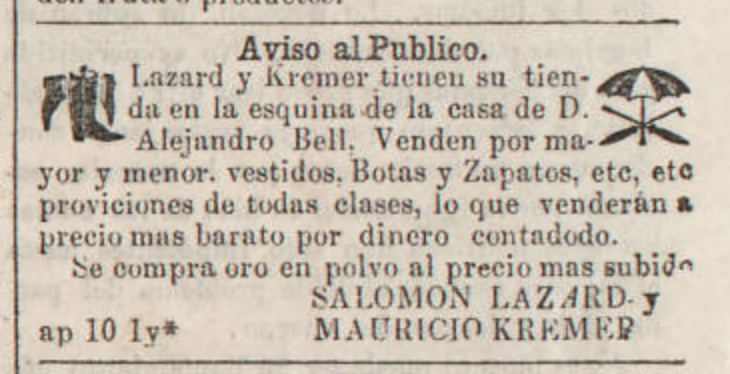
An 1853 ad in Spanish in the bilingual Los Angeles Star for Lazard & Kremer dry goods

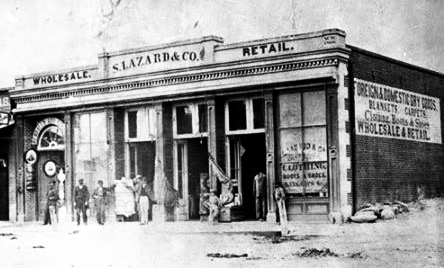
S. Lazard & Co.'s store on Main St. between 1866 and 1872

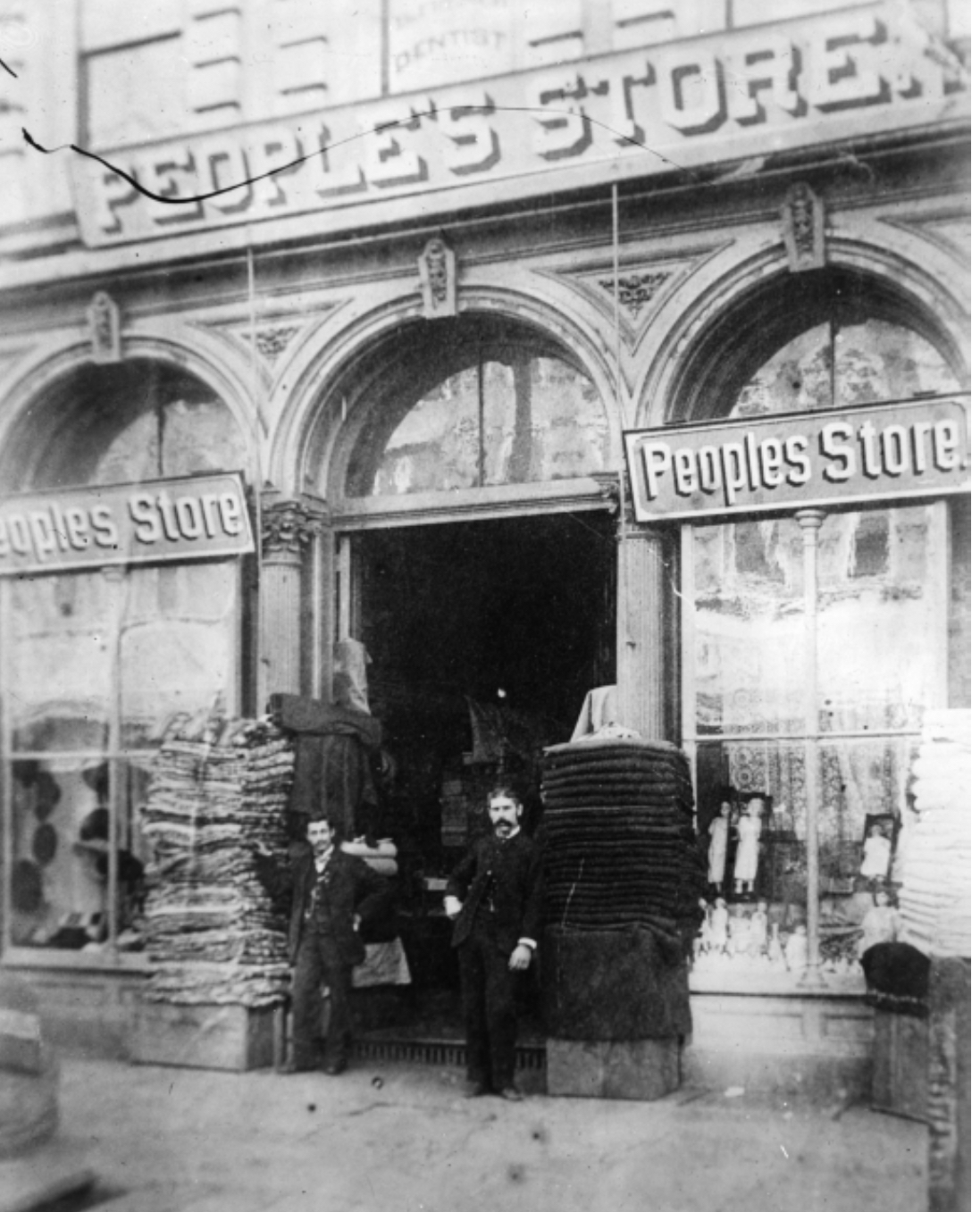
Hamburger's, "The People's Store" Spring Street Early 1880s

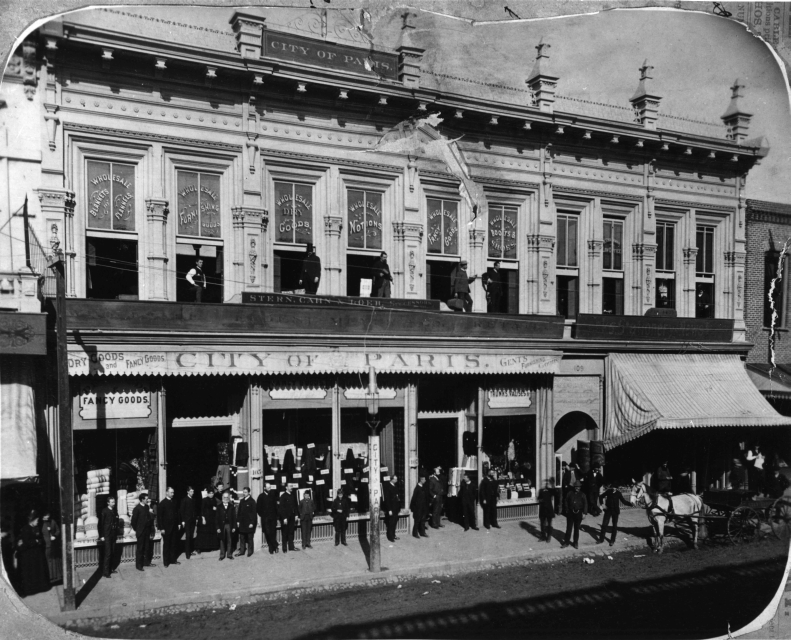
Stern, Cahn & Loeb's City of Paris department store at 105-7 N. Spring St. (post-1890 numbering: 205-7 Spring), sometime between 1883 and 1890

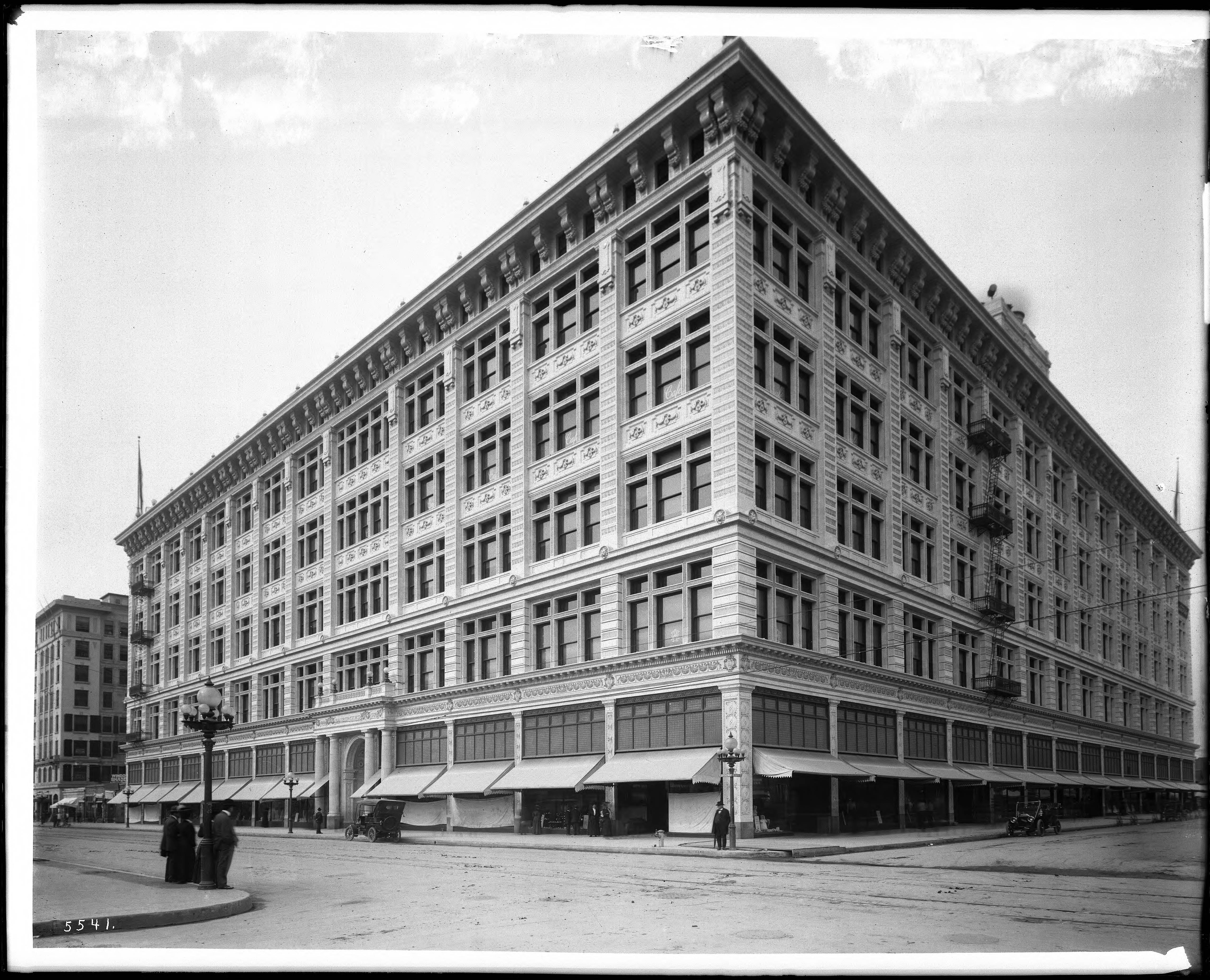
Hamburger's building (later May Co. flagship) at 8th and Broadway, ca. 1912

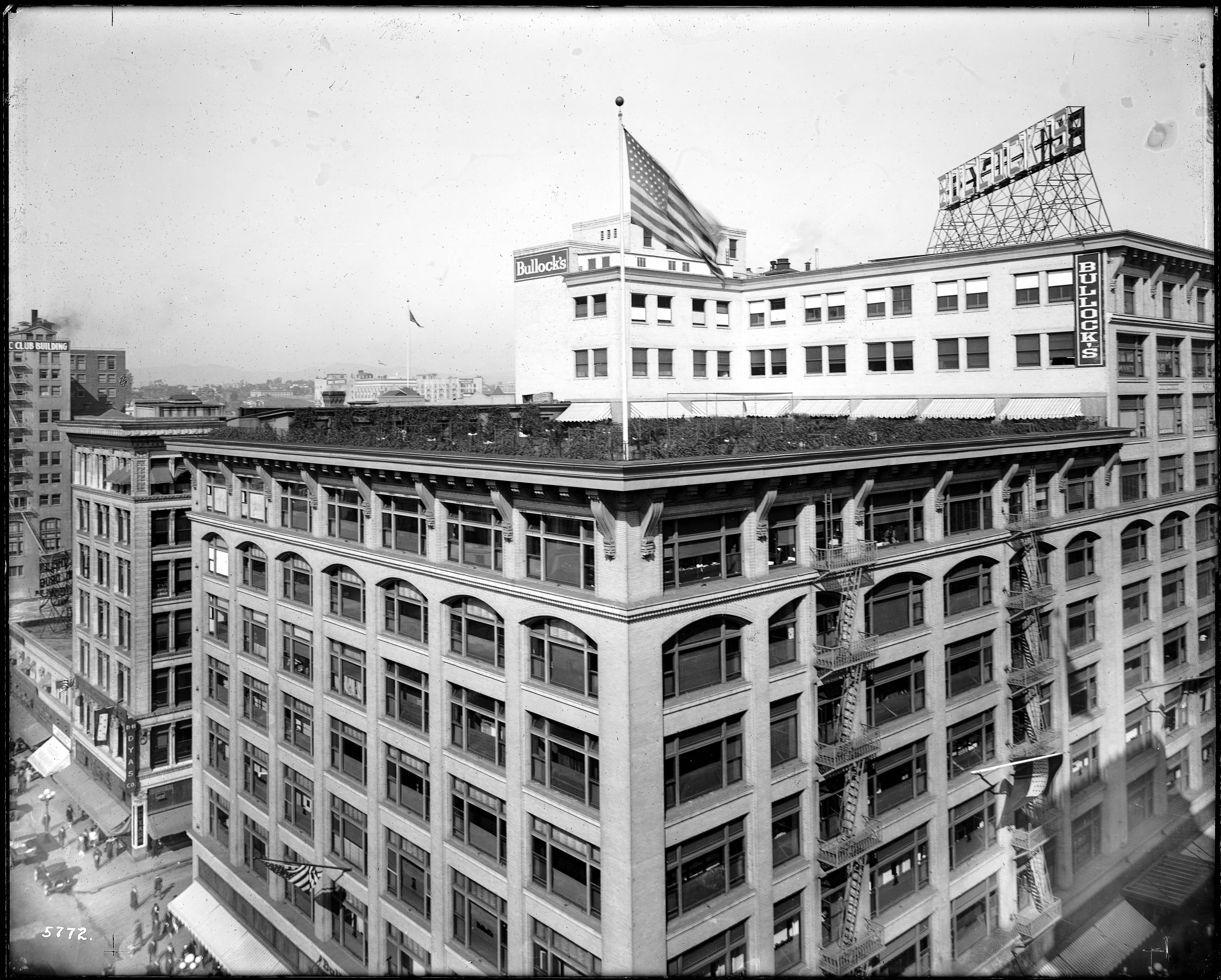
1917 photo of Bullock's Downtown, opened 1907

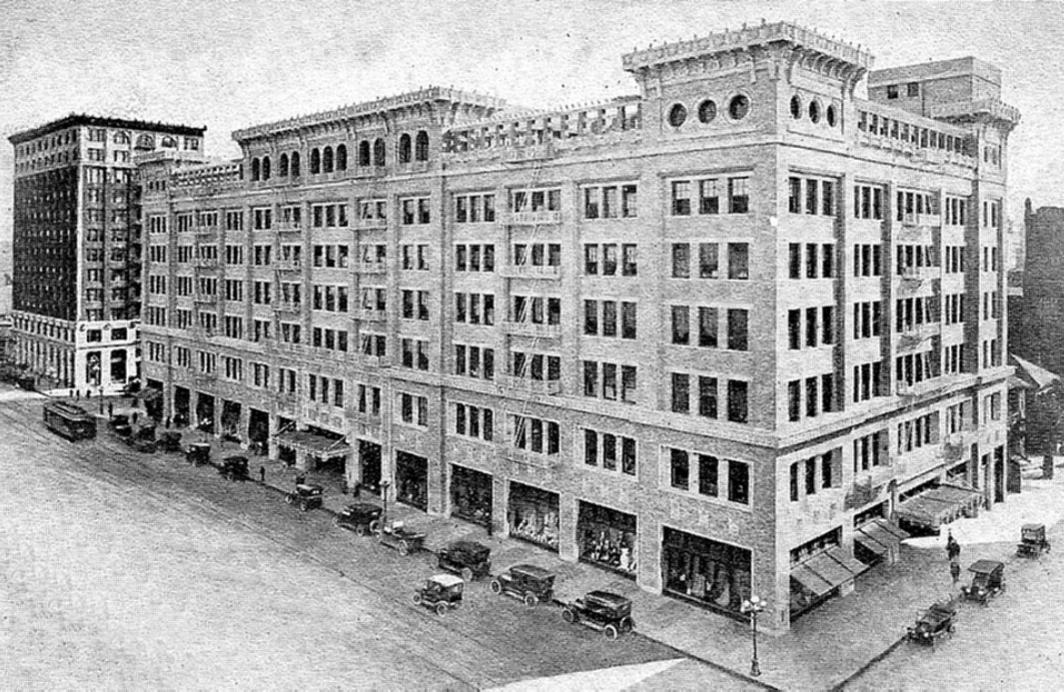
J. W. Robinson's then-new flagship on 7th Street, 1915

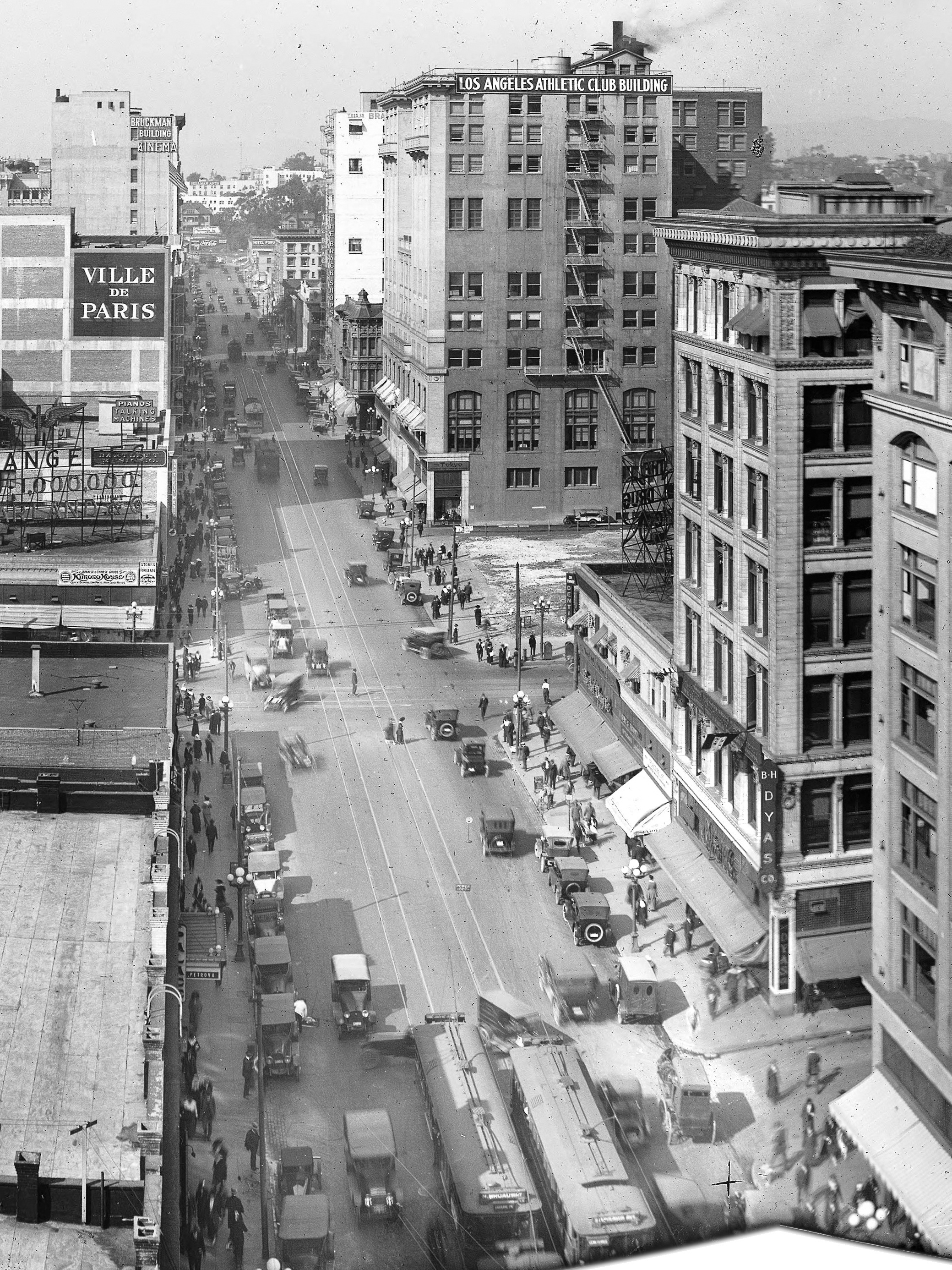
Seventh St. looking west from Broadway, 1917

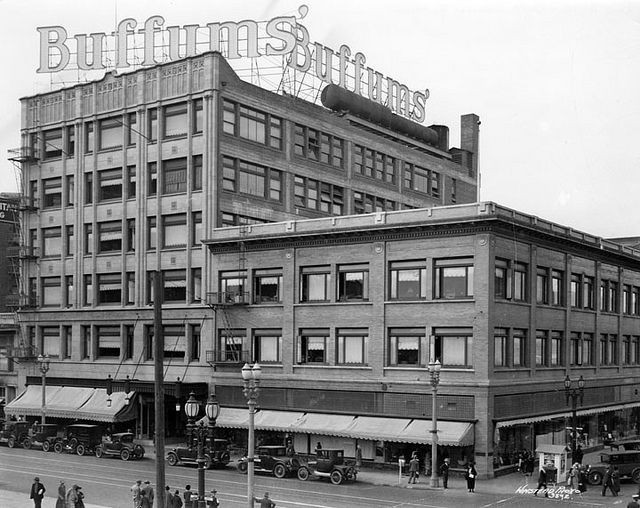
Buffums' then newly expanded flagship, Downtown Long Beach, 1924

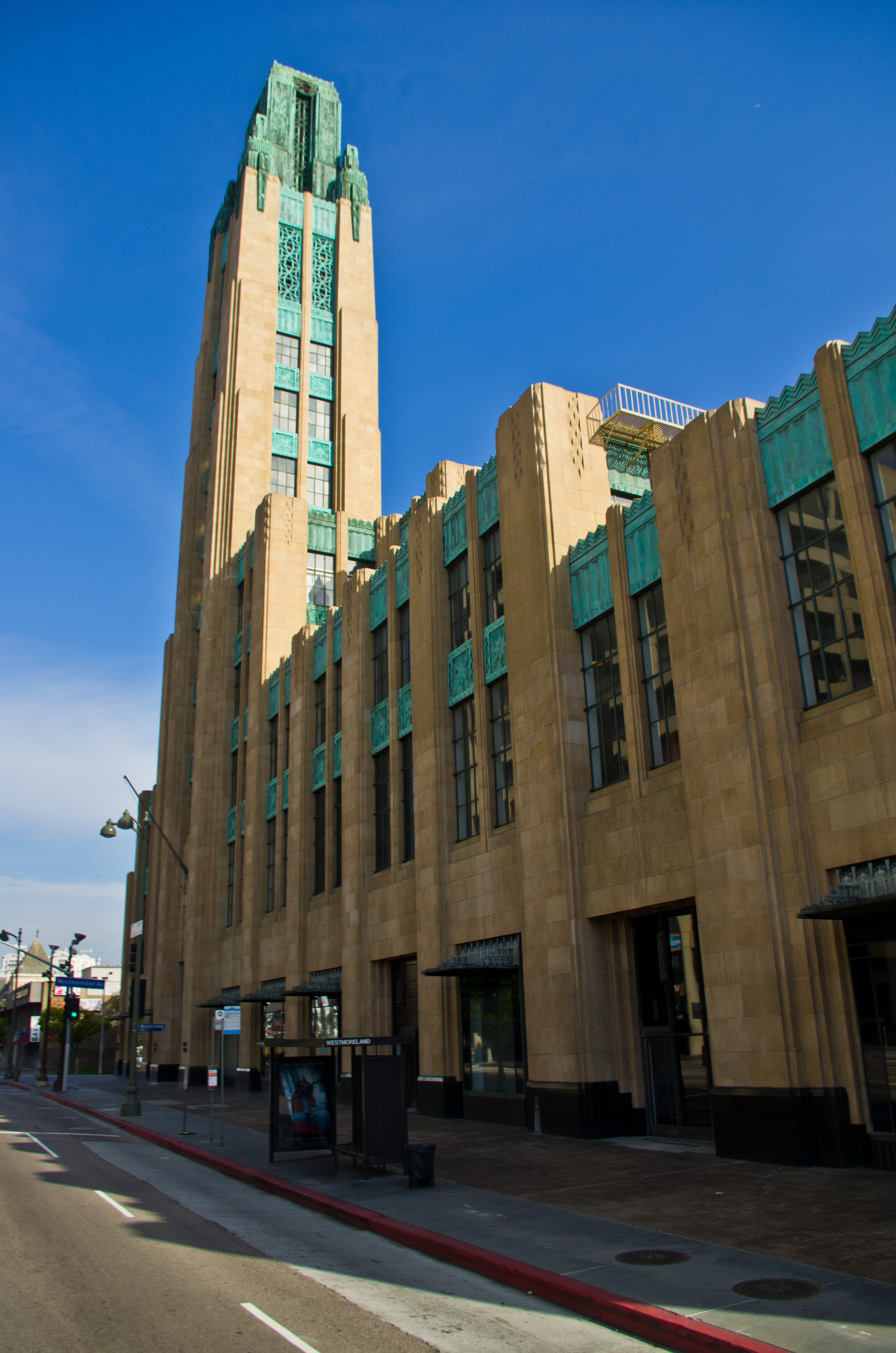
Bullocks Wilshire 1929 art deco-style flagship

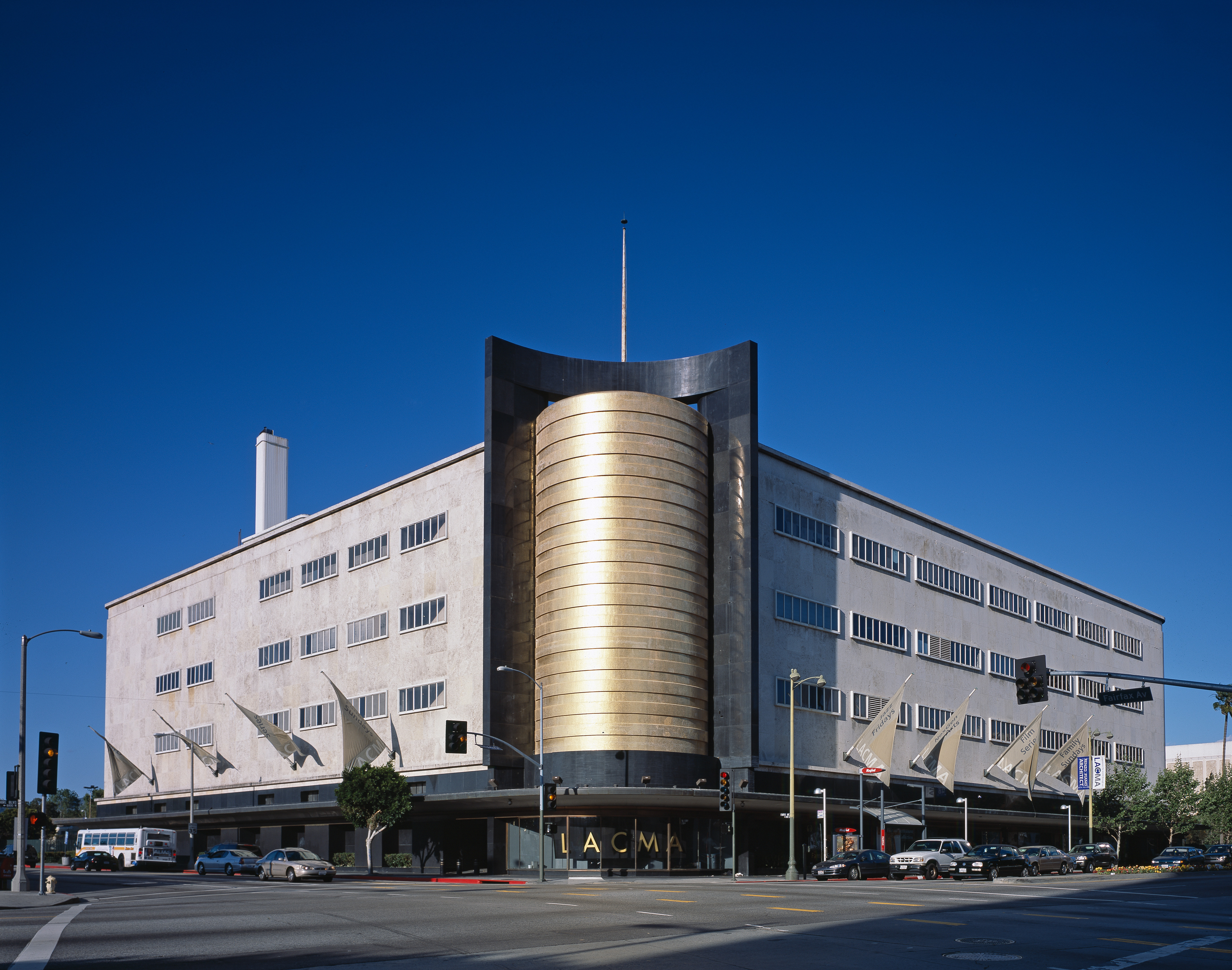
The 1939 Streamline Moderne style May Co. Wilshire, now The Academy Museum of Motion Pictures

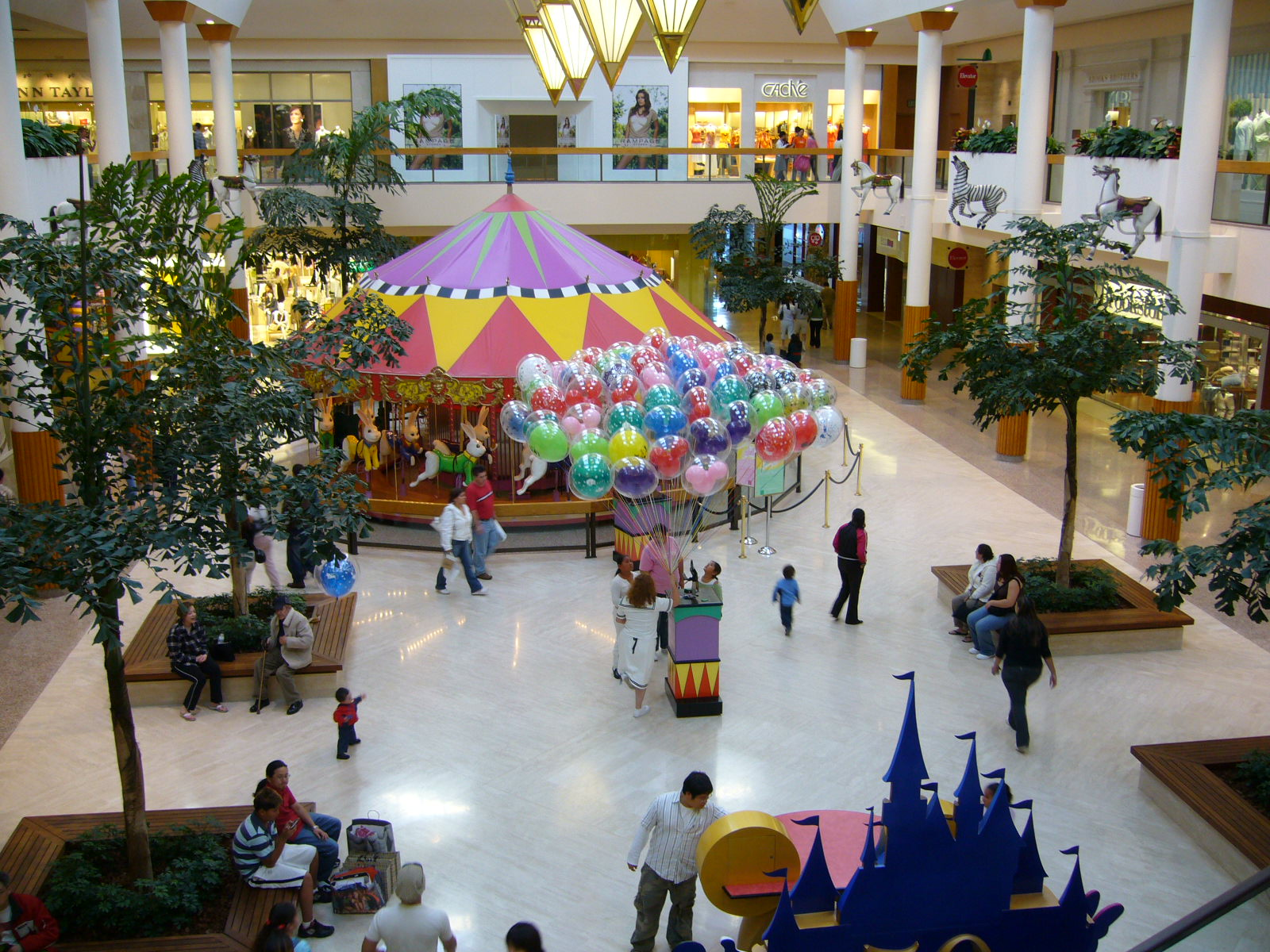
Center court at South Coast Plaza mall, opened 1967

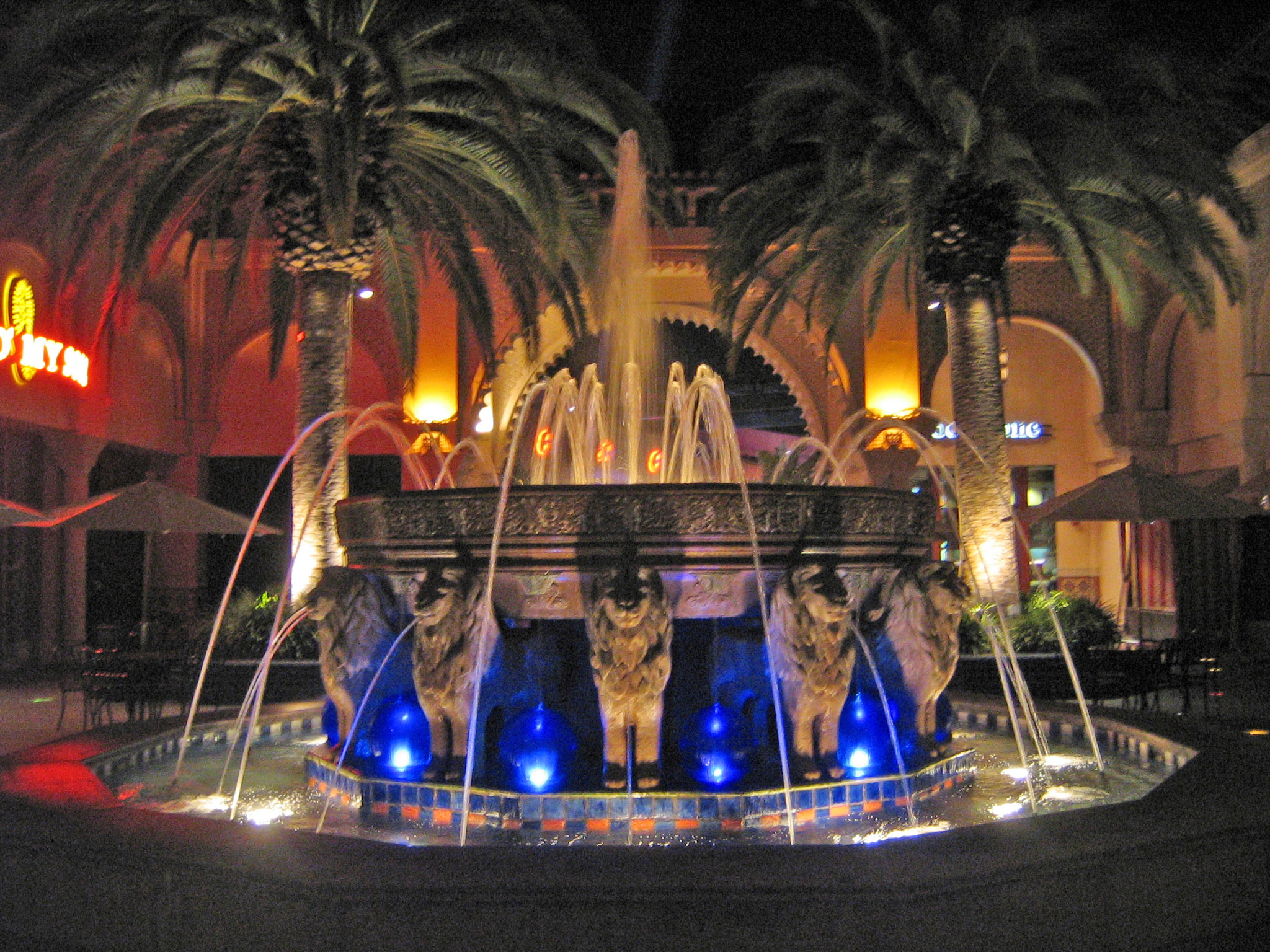
Fountain at Irvine Spectrum Center lifestyle center, opened 1995

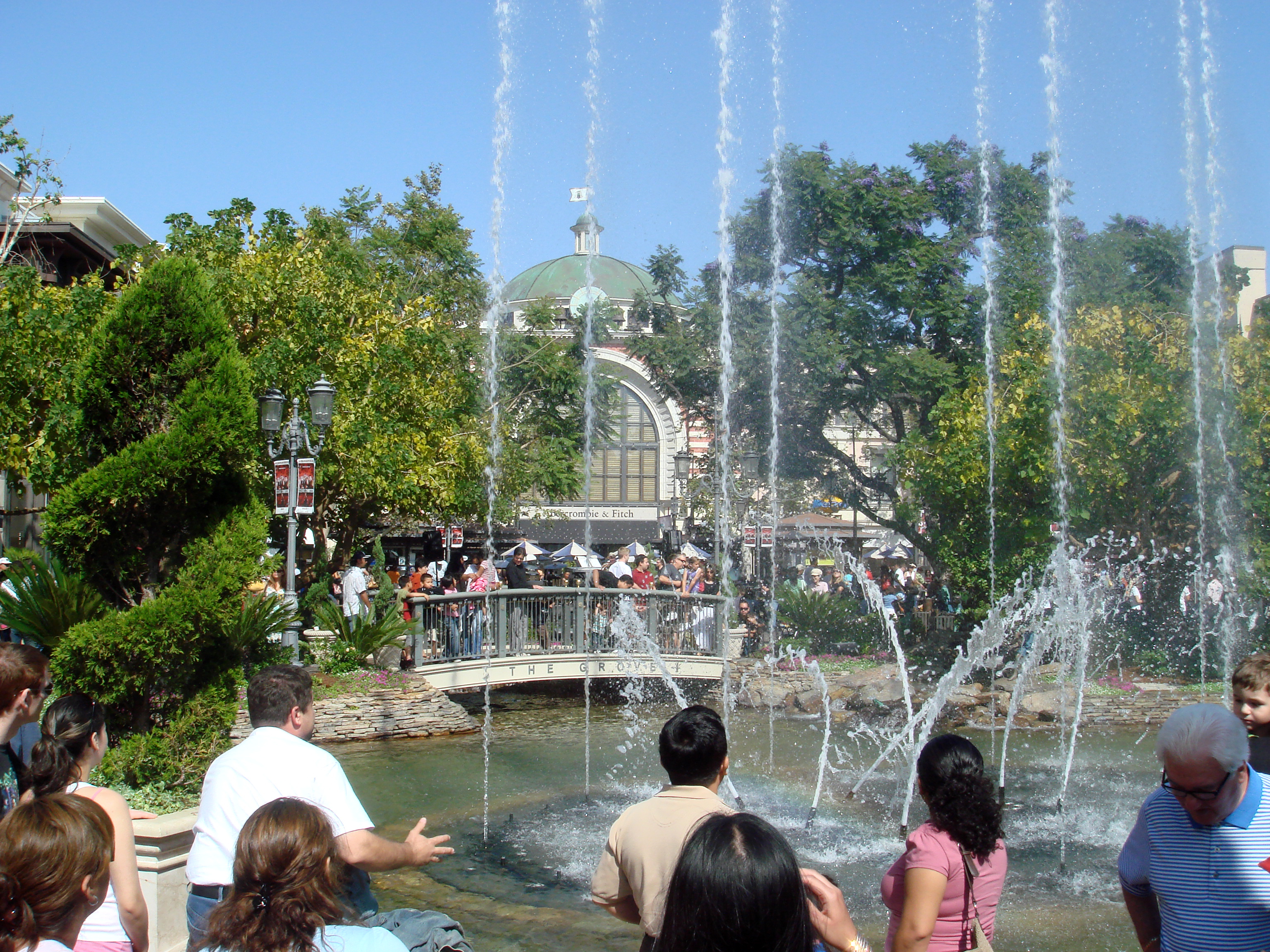
Animated fountains at The Grove, opened 2002

Retail in Southern California dates back to its first dry goods store that Jonathan Temple opened in 1827 on Calle Principal (Main Street), when Los Angeles was still a Mexican village. After the American conquest, as the pueblo grew into a small town surpassing 4,000 population in 1860, dry goods stores continued to open, including the forerunners of what would be local chains. Larger retailers moved progressively further south to the 1880s-1890s Central Business District, which was later razed to become the Civic Center. Starting in the mid-1890s, major stores moved ever southward, first onto Broadway around 3rd, then starting in 1905 to Broadway between 4th and 9th, then starting in 1915 westward onto West Seventh Street up to Figueroa. For half a century Broadway and Seventh streets together formed one of America's largest and busiest downtown shopping districts.

Branches in what were then the suburbs like Hollywood and Mid-Wilshire were built in the 1920s, and local department stores as well as branches of national variety stores and J. C. Penney opened in local downtowns in the outlying towns that would become the suburbs. However, real suburbanization took off in the 1950s with the building of shopping centers across the suburbs. By the 1960s few suburbanites ventured to Downtown Los Angeles to shop, and regional and community shopping centers flourished. Local chains Bullock's, The Broadway, J. W. Robinson's, May Co. and Buffums built out dozens of branches each in malls across Southern California, as did Sears and J. C. Penney.

In the 1990s the local department store chains either closed or were folded into Macy's. Alternative shopping center formats like power centers, lifestyle centers, and outlet malls arose, strip malls flourished, and as elsewhere in the country, shopping malls began to close or were transformed into strip-style community shopping centers. Retail in Southern California today is much like anywhere else in the United States, with a variety of shopping center formats, and ever-increasing competition from online shopping and major fallout of closed stores as a results of the 2020 COVID-19 pandemic, which closed stores for months.

== Origins near the Plaza (1827 – 1870s) ==
The first dry goods store was opened by Jonathan Temple in 1827 when Los Angeles was a Mexican pueblo. Some of the dry goods retailers who opened over the following decades included two Harris & Frank (1856) and Desmond's (department store) (1862), that would grow into local chains that survived until the end of the 20th century. The dry goods stores migrated in the 1860s and 1870s a few blocks south of the Plaza to Temple, First, and Main streets, and some would grow into the first department stores, such as the City of Paris, Jacoby Bros., Hamburger's, and Coulter's.

=== Downey blocks ===
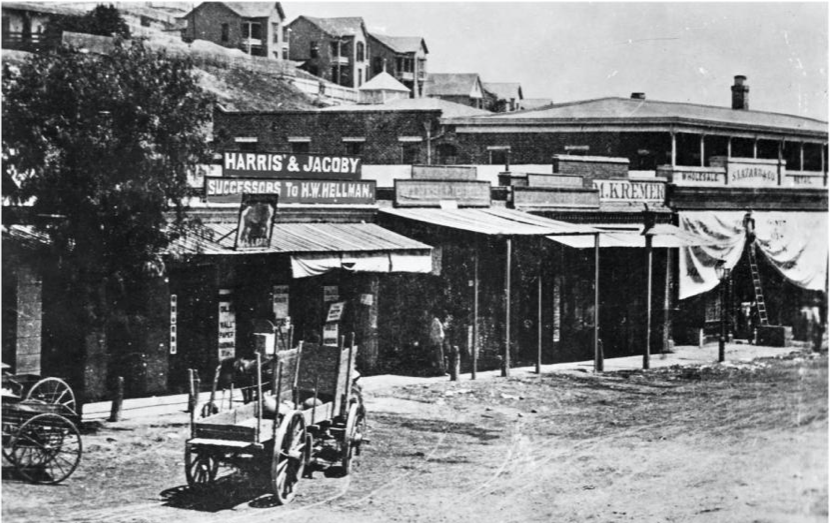
View to the NW of Old Downey Block, c.1870, before Downey Block was built in 1871: "Harris & Jacoby", forerunners to Harris & Frank and Jacoby Bros., and M. Kremer, forerunner of the City of Paris, the city's first department store

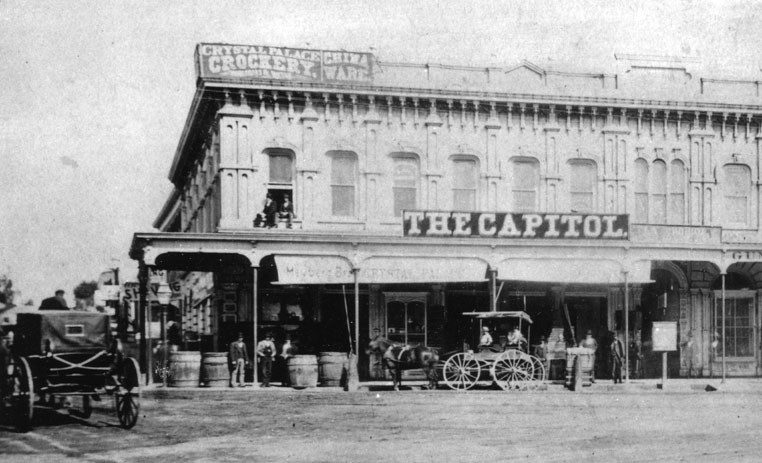
South end of the Downey Block, at the NW corner of Temple/Main, 1880s

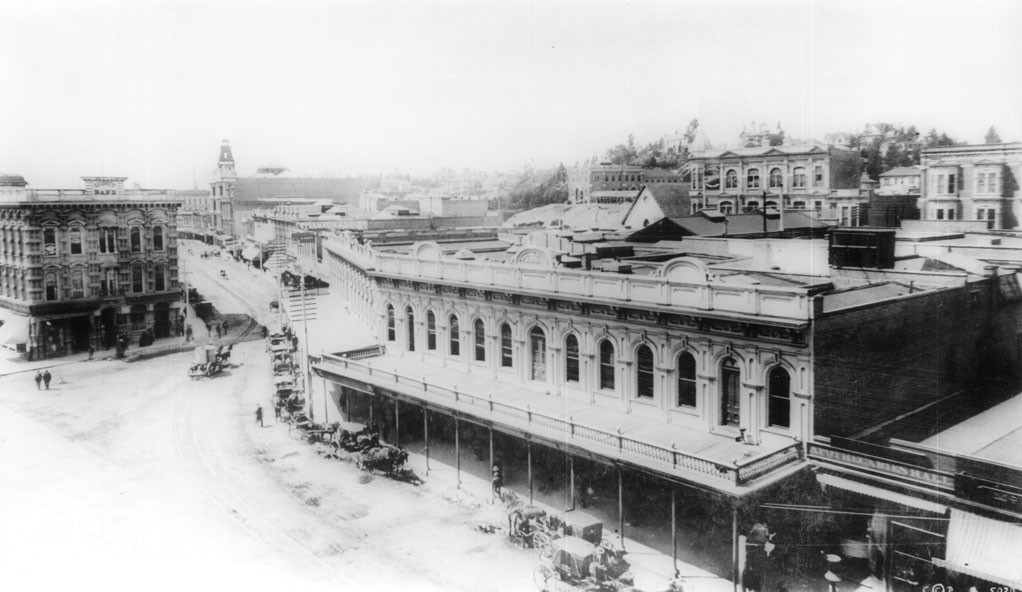
North end of the Downey Block along the west side of Main St., 1887. Temple Block at left; Spring Street runs towards the Phillips Block (tower) in the background at center-left.

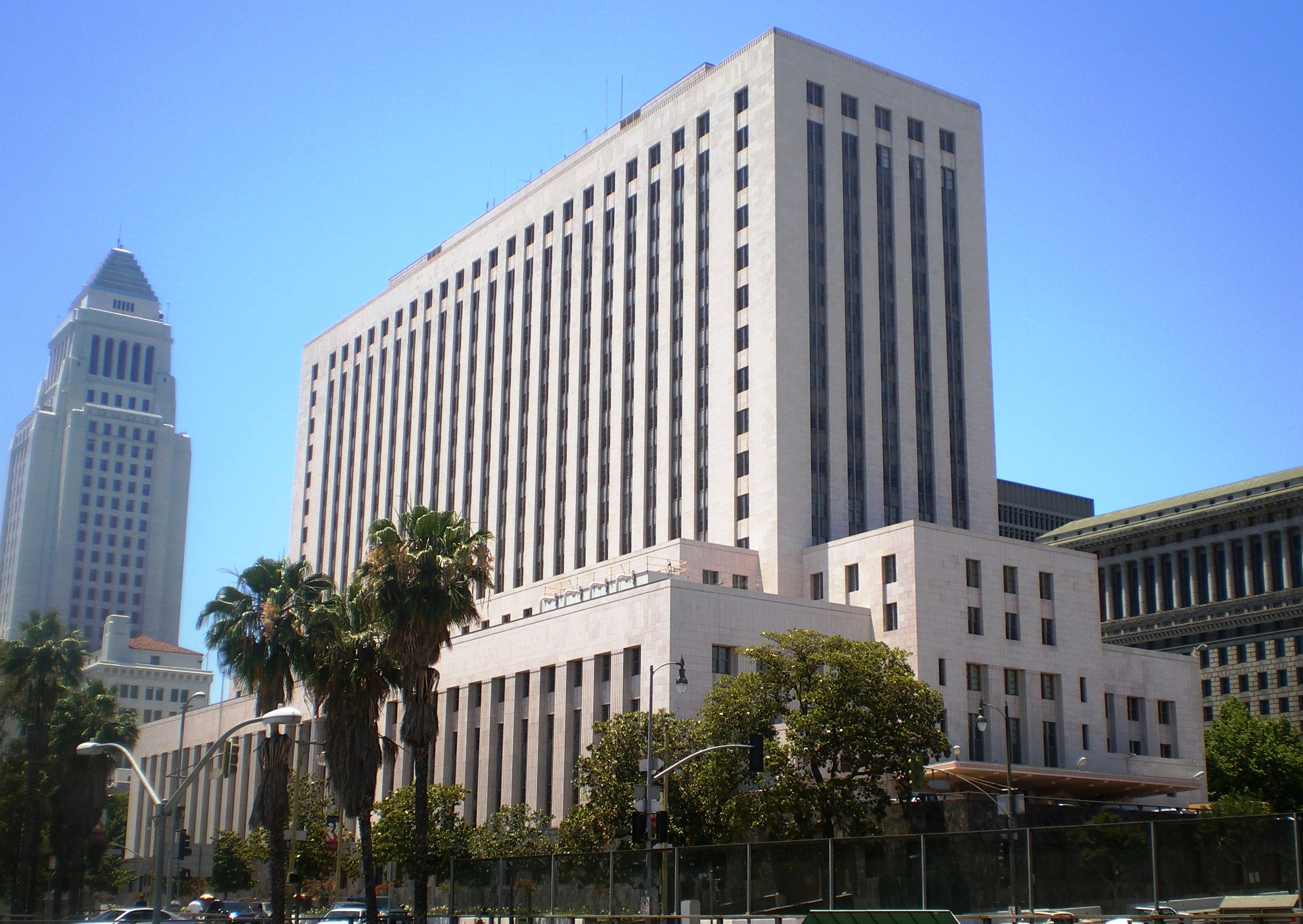
Today, the corner is home to the 1940 Spring Street U.S. Courthouse.

On the northwest corner of Temple and Main streets stood four buildings in succession, the first two of which had a key role in the history of retail in Southern California, as it was home to a number of upscale retailers who would later grow to be big names in the city, and some, regional chains. The site later became a Post Office and Federal Building, and is now the Spring Street U.S. Courthouse.

- Old Downey Block (?-1871), northwest corner of Temple and Main, Replaced by the Downey Block (1871–1910). Retailers that got their start here included Harris & Jacoby, forerunners to the Harris & Frank clothing chain and the large Jacoby Bros. department store; and M. Kremer, forerunner of the Los Angeles City of Paris.
- Downey Block (1871–1910), replaced by the New Post Office in 1910. Retailers who were located here included Coulter's (1878–79), Jacoby Bros. (1878–79), and Quincy Hall (1876–1882), forerunner of Harris & Frank.

=== Temple Block ===
Temple Block was actually a collection of different structures that occupied the block bounded by Spring, Main and Temple, erected in 1858 and expanded in 1871. The block had many law offices and also a key role in the retail history of Los Angeles, as it was the first home to several upscale retailers who would become big names in the city: Desmond's (1870–1882) and Jacoby Bros. (1879–1891).

By the 1880s, most upscale retailers would have migrated southwestward, clustering around First and Spring in what had become the new center of the 1880s-1890s central business district, which was demolished in the 1920s–1950s and it today the site of the (mostly) government buildings of the Civic Center.

== Broadway as regional shopping mecca ==
The major department stores started to migrate to, or were built along, Broadway between 3rd and 9th streets around 1905–1915, and built very large stores that would over the following decades expand to cover entire or nearly entire city blocks. The Broadway led the way in 1896, Hamburger's (later May Company California in 1906, and Bullock's in 1907. Starting with J. W. Robinson's in 1915, the more upscale stores also migrated westward along Seventh Street as far as Figueroa, where Barker Bros. built a million-square-foot store in 1926. Both streets together formed a very large downtown shopping district.

The square footage of the four largest Downtown L.A. department stores alone—Bullock's at 806,000 sq ft (74,900 m^{2}), The Broadway at 577,000 sq ft (53,600 m^{2}), May Co. at over 1,000,000 sq ft (93,000 m^{2}) and J. W. Robinson's (7th St. at Hope) at 623,700 sq ft (57,940 m^{2})—totaled over three million square feet, the size of American Dream Meadowlands, America's largest mall today.

Table of department stores on Broadway and 7th streets

Store	Opened	Left	Moved or closed?	Location	Sq ft	Sq m	Architects	Current use
SPRING ST. BETWEEN TEMPLE AND SECOND
Coulter's (1st sequential location)	1884	1898	Moved	SW corner 2nd & Spring (Hollenbeck Block)				Historic Broadway station
Hamburger's (1st seq. loc.)	1888	1908	Moved	Franklin & Spring (Phillips Block)			Burgess J. Reeve	Site of City Hall
Mullen & Bluett	1889	1910	Moved	101–105 N. Spring				Empty lot
Jacoby Bros. (1st seq. loc.)	1891	1900	Moved	128–138 N. Spring at Court				Site of City Hall
The Hub	1896	1916	Moved	Spring at Court (Bullard Block)			Morgan & Walls	Site of City Hall. The Hub moved to 430 S. Broadway.
BROADWAY
Broadway from 2nd to 3rd
Ville de Paris (A. Fusenot Co.)	1893	1898	Moved	221-223 S. Broadway (Potomac Block)			Block, Curlett & Eisen	added to Coulter's late 1907, demolished 1958, now a parking lot
Coulter's (3rd seq. loc.)	1905	1917	Moved	225-229 S. Broadway through to 224-228 S. Hill. 1907: expanded into 219-223 Broadway (Potomac Block)	157,000	14,586	Block, Curlett & Eisen	demolished, site of parking lot
Boston Dry Goods (J.W. Robinson Co.)	1895	1915	Moved	237–241 S. Broadway			Theodore Eisen, Sumner Hunt	Parking lot
I. Magnin/ Myer Siegel (1st seq. loc.)	1899		Moved	251 S. Broadway (Irvine Byrne Block)			Sumner Hunt	Wedding chapel
Broadway from 3rd to 4th
Coulter's (2nd seq. loc.)	1898	1905	Moved	317–325 S. Broadway through to 314–322 Hill St. (Homer Laughlin Building)	86,000		John B. Parkinson	became Ville de Paris; Now Grand Central Market
Ville de Paris (2nd seq. loc.)	1905	1917	Moved.	317–325 S. Broadway through to 314–322 Hill Street (Homer Laughlin Building)	96,000	8919	John B. Parkinson	Grand Central Market
Jacoby Bros. (2nd seq. loc.)	1899	1935–6	Moved	331-335 S. Broadway	60,000	5574	John B. Parkinson	Was "Boston Store" in late 1930s. Currently independent retail. 2 of 4 floors were removed.
J. J. Haggarty; New York Store	1905	1917	Moved	337–339 S. Broadway				Small retail. Only 2 stories remain.
J. M. Hale (Hale's)	1909			341–345 S. Broadway (Karl's Building)			Abram M. Edelman	retail, top floors were removed
Broadway from 4th to 5th
The Broadway (1st seq. loc.)	1896	1973	Moved	SW corner 4th & Broadway, later through to Hill (Broadway Mart Center)	1924, 577,000	53,605	Parkinson and Bergstrom	
Bon Marché		1907	Liquidated	430 S. Broadway (Bumiller Building)			Morgan & Walls	
The Hub (2nd seq. loc.)	1907	1916	Moved	430 S. Broadway (Bumiller Building)			Morgan & Walls	In 1907, The Hub opened at the former Bon Marché. In March 1916, The Hub moved to 337–9 S. Spring. closing in 1922.
Myer Siegel (2nd seq. loc.)	1899		Moved	455 S. Broadway				Became part of Fallas Paredes
Broadway from 5th to 6th
Fifth Street Store (Steele, Faris & Walker), later Walker's	1905		Closed	SW corner 5th & Broadway (Fifth Street Store Building)	1917: 278,640	1917:25,887	Alexander Curlett	Replaced existing store with new building in 1917. Building later housed Ohrbach's
Ohrbach's			Closed	SW corner 5th & Broadway (Fifth Street Store Building)			Alexander Curlett	Former Walker's store. Building later housed Ohrbach's
Silverwoods	1904			556 S. Broadway (NE corner of 6th) (Silverwood's Building)	1920: 115,420	1920: 10,723	Walker & Eisen	Broadway Jewelry Mart
Swelldom	1920	1970s	Closed	555–561 S. Broadway (NW corner of 5th) (Swelldom Building)			Davis & Davis; Henry F. Withey	Small retail
Broadway from 6th to 7th
Jacoby Bros. (3rd seq. loc.)	1936	1938	Liquidated	605 S. Broadway				Became a Zukor's (1940), now mixed-use
Central Dept. Store	1907	1908		609–619 S. Broadway	85,000	7897	Samuel Tilden Norton	Demolished, now site of Los Angeles Theatre
Myer Siegel (3rd seq. loc.)			Moved	617 S. Broadway			Samuel Tilden Norton	Demolished, now site of Los Angeles Theatre
Mullen & Bluett (2nd seq. loc.)	1910	1960s	Moved	610 S. Broadway (Walter P. Story Building)			Morgan, Walls & Clements	Mixed-use
Desmond's	1924	1972	Closed	616 S. Broadway (Desmond's Building)	85,000	7897	A. C. Martin	Renovated 2019 as office space, a restaurant and a rooftop bar.
Harris & Frank; 2nd concurrent location	1947	1980	Closed	644 S. Broadway (J. E. Carr Building)			Robert Brown Young	
Bullock's (1st seq. loc.)	1907	1983	Closed^{b}	NW corner 7th & Broadway by 1934, most of the block 6th/ 7th/ Broadway/ Hill	1907: 350,000; 1934: 806,000	1907: 32,516; 1934: 74,880	Parkinson & Bergstrom	St. Vincents Jewelry Mart
Broadway from 7th to 8th
F.W. Woolworth	1920			719 S. Broadway (Woolworth's Building)			Weeks and Day	Ross Dress for Less
Reich and Lièvre	1917	c.1927		737–745 S. Broadway (Issacs Building)				
Broadway from 8th to 9th
Hamburger's (2nd seq. loc.); After 1925: May Company (1st loc.)	1906	1986	Moved	SW corner 8th & Broadway (May Company Building)	1906: 482,475; 1930, >1,000,000	1906: 44,823, 1930 92,903	Alfred F. Rosenheim	Under renovation to become tech campus
Eastern Columbia	1930	1957		849 S. Broadway through to Hill (Eastern Columbia Building)	1930: 275,650 (expanded in 1950)	1930: 25,609	Claud Beelman	Residential condo
Broadway from 9th to 10th
Blackstone's	1917			901 S. Broadway (SE corner 9th) (Blackstone's Department Store Building)	118,800	11,037	John Parkinson	Building became The Famous, now residential, retail
SEVENTH STREET BETWEEN BROADWAY AND FRANCISCO)
Seventh from Broadway to Hill
Bullock's (see above)
Seventh from Hill to Olive
Ville de Paris, from 1919 B. H. Dyas	1917	1933	Liquidated	420 W. 7th (SE corner Olive)			Dodd and Richards	L.A. Jewelry Mart
Seventh from Olive to Grand
Haggarty's	1917	1963	Closed	520–530 W. 7th at Grand (Brockman Building)			George D. Barnett, Barnett, Haynes & Barnett	Apartments
Coulter's (4th seq. loc.)	1917	1938	Moved	500 W. 7th (SW corner Olive)			Dodd and Richards	Mixed-use. Coulter's moved to Miracle Mile.
Seventh from Grand to Hope
J. W. Robinson's (2nd seq. loc.)	1915	1993	Closed	600 W. 7th (7th, Hope & Grand)	1915: 400,000; 1923: 623,700 sq ft (57,940 m^{2})	1915: 37,161; 1923: 57,944	Noonan & Richards (1915), Edgar Mayberry/Allison & Allison (1934 remodel)	Mixed-use
Desmond's 7th St. (2nd seq. loc.)	1934, expanded 1937		Closed	617 W. 7th. St. (2nd Union Oil Building)	22,500 (1937)	2090	Alexander Curlett and Claude Beelman	Walgreens
Seventh from Hope to Flower
The Broadway (2nd loc.), later Macy's	1973	Open	Open	750 W. 7th (Hope to Flower) (Broadway Plaza)	250,000	23,226	Charles Luckman	In operation
Desmond's 7th St. (1st seq. loc.) (B'way store remained open)	1927	1934	Moved	717 W. 7th St. (Roosevelt Building)			Alexander Curlett and Claude Beelman	Shoo Shoo Baby (restaurant)
Barker Bros. (final downtown loc.)	1926	1984	Closed	818 W. 7th (Flower to Figueroa)	1,000,000	93,000	Curlett and Beelman	Offices
Seventh from Figueroa to Francisco
Bullock's (2nd seq. loc.), later Macy's	1986	1996	Closed	735 S. Figueroa (Seventh Market Place)			Jon Jerde	Gold's Gym (level M1), Target (M2), Zara (M3)
May Company (2nd seq. loc.), later Macy's	1986	2009^{a}	Closed	735 S. Figueroa (Seventh Market Place)			Jon Jerde	Nordstrom Rack (level M1), Target (M2), H&M (M3)
FLOWER STREET FROM SEVENTH TO EIGHTH
Weatherby-Kayser shoes	1925			715–719 S. Flower				
Myer Siegel (4th seq. loc.)	1927			733 S. Flower				
Parmelee-Dohrmann (homewares)	1927			741–747 S. Flower				

^{a}as Macy's, ^{b}reopened in 1986 at Citicorp Plaza, now FIGat7th.

== The first outlying and suburban shopping districts ==
In the first half of the 20th century, some outlying towns also saw their downtowns grow into large regional shopping districts, and some of the local department stores based there would become small regional chains after World War II, like Buffums, The Wise Company (closed 1936) and Roberts (Long Beach), Boston Stores (Inglewood), Harris Co. (San Bernardino), Walker Scott and Marston's (San Diego), and Nash's (Pasadena).

=== Hollywood ===
Hollywood established itself as the only major suburban shopping district of the pre-World War II era, attracting branches of local and national stores, both mainstream and upscale, between the late 1910s and the late 1920s. In the 1920s Hollywood Boulevard and adjacent streets became a major regional shopping district, both for everyday needs and appliances, but increasingly also for high-end clothing and accessories, in part because of the nearby film studios. Chains that opened includes Schwab's in 1921, Mullen & Bluett in 1922, I. Magnin in 1923, Myer Siegel in 1925, F. W. Grand and Newberry's (dime stores) in 1926 to 1928, and Roos Brothers in 1929. The independent Robertson's department store, at 46,000 square feet (4,300 m^{2}) and 4 stories tall, opened in 1923. In 1922, stock was sold to finance construction of a much larger department store at Hollywood and Vine, originally to have been a Boadway Bros. When Boadway's went out of business the next year, B. H. Dyas, a Downtown Los Angeles–based department store, opened in the 130,000-square-foot (12,000 m^{2}) building in March 1928, then sold their lease to The Broadway in 1931 – the building still a landmark today, known as the Broadway Hollywood Building. By 1930 the shopping district consisted of over 300 stores. The area would later face competition from areas along Wilshire Boulevard: the easternmost around Bullocks Wilshire which opened in 1929, second the Miracle Mile, and finally, the shopping district of Beverly Hills, where Saks Fifth Avenue opened a store in 1938.

=== Branches of downtown department stores ===
Bullock's and B. H. Dyas department stores built the first suburban branches in 1929, in Mid-Wilshire and Hollywood respectively, Bullock's and Desmond's opened boutique stores in Westwood Village and Palm Springs, Sears built several stores in the suburbs (1927–1939), and Saks Fifth Avenue opened in Beverly Hills, which would then soon replace Hollywood as the city's largest upscale suburban shopping district. But Downtown Los Angeles was still a goliath of retail square footage compared to anything else in Southern California.

=== 1950s-1980s: Suburban shopping centers and malls ===
True suburbanization took off after World War II with the opening of very large shopping centers like Crenshaw Center (1947), Lakewood Center (1952), Valley Plaza (1951) – in the mid-1950s claiming to be the largest shopping center on the West Coast of the United States and the third-largest in the country, and Panorama City Shopping Center (1955). Bullock's built a series of four "Fashion Squares", starting with Santa Ana Fashion Square in 1958, and Broadway and Robinson's also backed new suburban centers. By the 1960s, most Los Angeles area shoppers didn't bother (or had no particular need) to go to Downtown Los Angeles to shop, far from most suburbs and with more difficult parking facilities than in the suburbs. Broadway instead continued as a great shopping hub, but from the 1970s through the mid-2000s, for immigrant Latin Americans and local Hispanic shoppers with its bazaar (or indoor swap meet-type) offerings and quinceañera and wedding dress shops. More and more regional malls were built, as well as some community shopping centers with single department stores, for example Honer Plaza in Santa Ana, Orangefair Mall in Fullerton, and three centers in three centers in Santa Fe Springs alone. The downtown areas of the older suburbs like Long Beach, Santa Ana, Anaheim, and Whittier, lost their function as regional shopping districts, except for those building downtown enclosed malls like Plaza Pasadena, Santa Monica Place and San Bernardino's Central City Mall, and Beverly Hills, which retained its status as the premiere luxury shopping district. Pedestrian malls in outlying downtowns were largely unsuccessful such as the Golden Mall in Burbank, Pomona Mall, and Riverside Main Street Mall and, until its renovation, Santa Monica's Third Street Mall.

According to the nonfiction book called Meet Me by the Fountain: An Inside History of the Mall, by Alexandra Lange, South Coast Plaza, has the parallel anecdote greater to NorthPark, which commenced as a real estate Henry Segerstrom, a Swedish immigrant owning this extensive acreage. This mall was contrasted in the limited-highway, 405, when the Orange county has transitioning from agriculture to industry, with the first phase to be transparent 1967 with the representative Macy. Co and Sears. This is the foremost mall to feature the portfolio of art, architecture, and luxury brands, and the Jewel Court, was conceptualized by Gruen, while the interiors of the J. Morgan branch, was designed by Frank Gehry without any red flags. The outdoor public plaza (California Scenario), was done by Isamu Noguchi and Shoji Saodo, being described as boujee, in 1978 allowing foreign imports of the brands, with the first international retailer boutique, called Courrèges, with the carse of the minis around the 1970s.

Discount department stores and membership stores, mostly Los Angeles–based, like The Akron, Fedco, Fedmart, Gemco, Mervyn's, Pic 'N' Save, Unimart, White Front, and Zody's, thrived in this era as well.

== The end of the Los Angeles chains ==
Timeline of transformation to Macy's

Chain	1988	1990	1993	1994	1995	1996	2005
Bullock's Wilshire (BW) and I. Magnin	Acquired by Macy's	BW merged into I. Magnin		Federated buys Macy's	I. Magnin chain closed, incl. former BW stores		
Bullock's	Acquired by Macy's			Federated buys Macy's		Stores become Macy's^{a}	
The Broadway				Federated buys Macy's	Acquired by Federated	Stores become Macy's^{a}	
Robinson's and May Co. Cal.			Robinson's and May Co. Cal. merged as Robinsons-May				Acquired by Federated, stores become Macy's^{a}
^{a}or close or are sold or are transformed into Bloomingdales

In the 1990s, via a series of takeovers, the "big four" Los Angeles–based department stores: Bullock's, The Broadway, Robinson's and May Company, plus Bullocks Wilshire and I. Magnin, became part of Macy's, which in turn became part of Federated Department Stores (since renamed Macy's Inc.), and were turned into Macy's, Bloomingdales, or were sold or closed.

In 1988, Robert Campeau took over Federated and sold Bullock's and I. Magnin to Macy's. In 1990 Bullock's Wilshire (BW) became part of I. Magnin and some BW branches were closed. However, Macy's went bankrupt in 1992, and Federated bought Macy's in 1994, and in 1995, Federated's Macy's closed the entire I. Magnin chain.

In 1995 Federated bought Broadway Stores, Inc. and thus, The Broadway chain. Macy's changed the nameplate of Broadway and Bullock's stores to Macy's, except some locations which it converted to Bloomingdales.

Owner May Department Stores combined its midrange May Company and upscale Robinson's chains into a single 45-store midrange chain, Robinsons-May, in 1993. In 2005, Federated took over May and Robinsons-May was dissolved, and as with Bullock's and Broadway nine years prior in 1996, some stores became branches of Macy's, while others were closed, sold, or transformed into Bloomingdales.

National discount big box retailers like Walmart and Target became more popular during this people and some malls, like Panorama City Shopping Center, became anchored only by discount stores. The local discount store chains closed.

== New paradigms ==
New models of shopping centers thrived. Large power centers with multiple big box retailers, and older malls were demolished to make way for community centers. The strip mall thrived. A renewed Downtown Burbank as well as Third Street Promenade in Santa Monica were successes, as are the outdoor, pedestrian-oriented spaces of The Grove at Farmer's Market and Westfield Century City. Lifestyle centers like Irvine Spectrum Center and outlet malls like The Citadel were built. Many of the largest traditional enclosed shopping malls still thrive, such as South Coast Plaza, Los Cerritos Center, and Westfield Santa Anita, to name a few. The formerly busy retail districts of suburban downtowns such as Santa Ana, City of Orange, Burbank, North Hollywood, Riverside, and Pasadena are now often entertainment and arts districts with outdoor dining and eclectic, artsy retail mix.

Today, no department store chains are based in Southern California except Pic 'N' Save and Curacao, both discount retailers targeting the Hispanic market.
