= Gilberto Centina, Jr. =

Gilberto Centina Jr is a Michelin-starred chef known for his first restaurant Holbox in Los Angeles, California, United States.

Centina is from Merida, Yucatan, Mexico and immigrated with his parents to the United States. Centina's parents opened a restaurant called Chichen Itza at the Mercado la Paloma food hall and community center in South Los Angeles, where Centina worked. He opened Holbox in 2017.

Centina has been a guest panelist weighing in on food matters at The New York Times.
