= Ira Yellin =

American real estate developer and urban planner (1940–2002)

- Born: Ira Edward Yellin; 1940; Springfield, Massachusetts, U.S.
- Died: September 10, 2002 (aged 62); Los Angeles, California, U.S.
- Education: Princeton University (BA); Harvard Law School (JD); UC Berkeley, Boalt Hall (LLM)
- Occupations: Real estate developer; lawyer; urban planner
- Known for: Redevelopment of Downtown Los Angeles Historic Core
- Notable work: Grand Central Market, Bradbury Building, Million Dollar Theater
- Spouse: Adele Adest Yellin
- Children: 2, including Jessica Yellin

Ira Edward Yellin (1940 – September 10, 2002) was an American real estate developer, lawyer, and urban planner who is widely credited as the pioneering figure behind the redevelopment of Downtown Los Angeles's Historic Core. Beginning in the mid-1980s, when few developers showed interest in the deteriorating city center, Yellin acquired, restored, and revitalized a cluster of landmark properties including the Grand Central Market, the Bradbury Building, and the Million Dollar Theater, establishing the foundations for the residential, cultural, and commercial resurgence that would follow over subsequent decades.

California State Librarian Kevin Starr described Yellin's contribution by stating that Los Angeles owed him a deep debt of gratitude, calling him unique in what he wanted for the city and what he helped to build.

== Early life and education ==
Ira Yellin was born in 1940 in Springfield, Massachusetts, the son of Rabbi Isaac Yellin, the founding rabbi of Temple Mishkon Tephilo in Venice, California. The Yellin family moved to Los Angeles in 1948, and Ira attended public schools in Santa Monica and the San Fernando Valley.

Yellin earned his undergraduate degree in history from Princeton University in 1962, followed by a law degree from Harvard Law School in 1965 and a master of laws degree from the University of California, Berkeley's Boalt Hall School of Law in 1966. He also served in the United States Marine Corps Reserve.

== Career ==
=== Law and early real estate ===
Yellin began his professional career in Los Angeles as a corporate attorney at the law firm of Rosenfeld, Meyer & Susman, where he served clients in the entertainment industry. His attention was gradually drawn to the deteriorating condition of Downtown Los Angeles, particularly the Historic Core, where the city had its origins.

In 1985, Yellin left the Hapsmith Company to form the Yellin Company, his own real estate investment and development firm. During this period, historic preservation and the adaptive reuse of older structures were not widely practiced in Los Angeles, and city building codes had not yet been modified to facilitate such projects.

=== Grand Central Square ===
Yellin's signature achievement was the creation of Grand Central Square, a complex comprising the Homer Laughlin Building (home to Grand Central Market), the Million Dollar Theater building, and the Bradbury Building. He acquired these interconnected properties in the mid-1980s, when Broadway was economically depressed and other developers were focused on building office skyscrapers on Bunker Hill.

His former partner Dan Rosenfeld recalled that Yellin had invested his resources and energy to initiate the cultural revitalization of downtown with some of its most significant and challenging buildings, recognizing that something transformative could happen in the heart of what became known as the Historic Core.

Working with preservation architect Brenda Levin, Yellin undertook extensive restorations of the properties. At Grand Central Market, a 1970s tile façade was stripped away to reveal original Beaux Arts architectural details, vintage neon signage was refurbished, and new parking was added. The renovation of the Million Dollar Theater building included the addition of 121 residential apartments, creating one of Downtown's first true mixed-use developments in decades and demonstrating that people would live in the densest and most urban part of Los Angeles if provided with a suitable environment.

=== Bradbury Building restoration ===
Yellin purchased the Bradbury Building—an 1893 National Historic Landmark renowned for its extraordinary skylit atrium, marble staircases, and French wrought-iron railings—and invested $7 million in restoration, preservation, and seismic retrofitting between 1989 and 1991. As part of the restoration, a storage area was converted into a new rear-entrance portico connecting the building to Biddy Mason Park, and the lighting system was redesigned with alabaster wall sconces imported from Spain. The project was executed in collaboration with architect Brenda Levin.

=== Adaptive reuse and urban policy ===
Yellin's restoration work led him into broader leadership roles in urban planning. He was one of the authors of the original Downtown Strategic Plan, and his projects provided the practical foundation and political case for the Los Angeles Adaptive Reuse Ordinance (ARO), passed by the Los Angeles City Council in 1999. The ARO streamlined building codes to allow the conversion of vacant commercial buildings into housing, ultimately generating over 12,000 new residential units in Downtown and serving as a model for similar ordinances nationwide.

Yellin championed the ordinance and, as described by multiple sources, his pioneering Grand Central Square apartments—which preceded the ARO by a decade—demonstrated the viability of downtown residential living and helped build the case for the policy's adoption.

=== Catellus Development and Urban Partners ===
From 1996 to 1999, Yellin served as senior vice president of Catellus Development Corporation, where he focused on complex mixed-use projects with community and urban significance, including work at Union Station. He subsequently co-founded Urban Partners LLC with real estate professionals Paul Keller and Daniel Rosenfeld. The firm's portfolio included the Del Mar Station in Pasadena, the Los Angeles County Hall of Justice, the Caltrans District 7 headquarters, the Herald Examiner Building, the University Gateway, the Wilshire/Vermont Station, and the Ambassador Hotel site.

=== Cathedral of Our Lady of the Angels ===
Yellin ran the international design competition to select the architect for the new Cathedral of Our Lady of the Angels, one of Downtown Los Angeles's most prominent cultural and religious landmarks. The competition ultimately selected Rafael Moneo, and the cathedral opened in 2002.

== Civic and cultural involvement ==
Beyond his development work, Yellin was an active civic leader and patron of the arts. His board memberships and affiliations included:

- Board of Trustees, J. Paul Getty Trust
- Board of Trustees, California Institute of the Arts
- Co-founder, Museum of Contemporary Art (MOCA)
- President, American Jewish Committee, Los Angeles Chapter
- Board of Directors, Los Angeles Police Foundation
- Board of Directors, Los Angeles Theatre Center
- Project Restore (restoration of Los Angeles City Hall)

== Multicultural impact and urban philosophy ==
Yellin's approach to development was rooted in a belief that Los Angeles's diversity was its greatest asset. His thesis at UC Berkeley posited that a city deteriorating from its core would see decline spread throughout the entire region. He believed that a heterogeneous Los Angeles could be reborn and reinvented only by rediscovering the soul of its city center, and that the richness of urban life resided in the interdependence and connections between its people.

Grand Central Market, in particular, served as a living embodiment of this philosophy. Under the Yellin family's stewardship, the market brought together the cuisines and cultures of the city's diverse communities—from longtime Latino vendors who had served the Broadway corridor for decades, to newer arrivals reflecting the shifting demographics of the neighborhood. The market drew approximately two million visitors annually, functioning as a rare public gathering space in a city often criticized for lacking such places.

In a 1997 speech to the National Association for Women in Construction, Yellin articulated his frustration that builders, architects, and urban planners in Los Angeles had done a poor job of communicating the economic and social value of the built environment to the public and political leadership. He argued that it was the shared experience and satisfaction in the built form of a city that built a sense of community, helped people feel identified with their institutions, created civic pride, and nourished social stability.

== Legacy ==
=== Death ===
Yellin was diagnosed with lung cancer in 2001. He died on September 10, 2002, at his home in Los Angeles. He was 62. His final illness was covered extensively by the Los Angeles Times. His obituary was published in the Los Angeles Times on September 11, 2002.

=== Influence on subsequent development ===
Yellin's work directly enabled and inspired the next wave of Downtown Los Angeles developers. Tom Gilmore, who purchased four buildings at Fourth and Main streets and became another transformative figure in the Downtown revival, built directly on the decades of work by Yellin and Wayne Ratkovich. The Adaptive Reuse Ordinance that Yellin championed was used by Gilmore and others to convert commercial buildings throughout Downtown into residential lofts, hotels, and creative offices, fundamentally transforming the neighborhood.

Yellin's widow, Adele Yellin, continued his development philosophy after his death, overseeing a revitalization of Grand Central Market that brought a new generation of vendors beginning in 2013. The transformation attracted national media attention, with Bon Appétit naming Grand Central Market to its "Hot 10" restaurants list in 2014.

Dan Rosenfeld, writing on the tenth anniversary of Yellin's death, observed that the thousands who appreciated the culture and vitality of the rediscovered downtown owed deep appreciation to Yellin, even if they never knew the man—and that it was Yellin who brought everyone together.

In February 2003, Los Angeles City Councilwoman Jan Perry officially dedicated Ira Yellin Square at the intersection of Third Street and Broadway, adjacent to Grand Central Market, in honor of the late developer. Rosenfeld wrote that all Downtown developers owed a deep debt of gratitude to Yellin.

== Personal life ==
Yellin married Adele Adest, whom he met while she was still in high school. Together they had two children: Jessica Yellin, who became a journalist and chief White House correspondent for CNN, and Seth Yellin. The family was deeply involved in civic and political life; both Ira and Adele campaigned for Robert F. Kennedy during his 1968 presidential campaign.
