= Weatherby-Kayser =

American footwear retailer chain

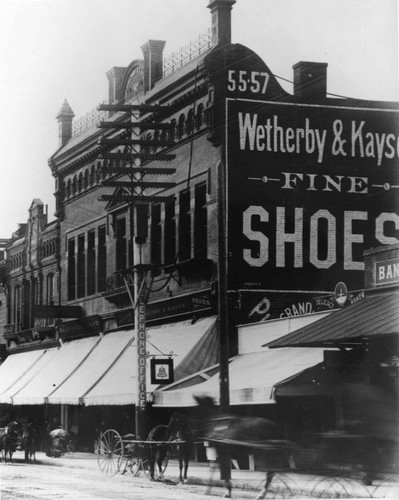
Weatherby-Kayser Building, 55-57 Colorado Blvd., Pasadena, 1904

The Weatherby-Kayser Shoe Company was a chain of footwear retailers with origins in Los Angeles in the early 1900s. It was founded in 1884 by Bruce Weatherby and Emil Kayser (d. August 26, 1948).

On December 1, 1902, the store moved to 215 S. Broadway in the B. F. Coulter Building (Potomac Block), then in 1911 to the Grant Building at 4th and Broadway, following the gradual migration of upscale stores ever further south and west from the Los Angeles Plaza before suburbanization. In 1924, the store had opened branches in Pasadena and Hollywood. By 1925, the main store was at 416-8 W. Seventh Street, between Olive and Hill, about 17,000 sq ft (1,600 m^{2}) in size, in addition to the 4th & Broadway store and a store at the Ambassador Hotel on Wilshire Boulevard. In 1925 it opened a 12,000 sq ft (1,100 m^{2}) store at 715–7–9 S. Flower St., in the new upscale shopping area around J. W. Robinson's and Barker Brothers' new stores, which a newspaper at the time called the "Fifth Avenue of the West".

== Expansion ==
=== Other Western cities ===
By the 1920s there was a store in San Diego on 6th Street. A store opened in Valley Plaza in 1955.

=== Arizona ===
In 1929 Weatherby-Kayser opened a store in Phoenix, Arizona, in the Security Building at 242 N. Central Avenue. It later opened a branch in 1961 in El Con Center in Tucson, and by 1964 Chris-Town in Phoenix.

=== St. Louis area ===
By 1963 the chain had opened four stores in the St. Louis area, including one in Richmond Heights, Missouri, across from what was then the Westroads Shopping Center (now the Saint Louis Galleria).

=== Los Angeles suburbs ===
In 1985 the firm advertised 13 locations in Greater Los Angeles:

- Westside: Westwood, Century City, and Culver City–Fox Hills Mall
- San Fernando Valley: Topanga Plaza, and Sherman Oaks Fashion Square
- South Bay: Palos Verdes–Peninsula Center and Torrance-Del Amo Fashion Center
- San Gabriel Valley: Puente Hills, Arcadia–Santa Anita Fashion Park, and West Covina Fashion Plaza
- Southeast Los Angeles County: Cerritos
- Orange County: Santa Ana Fashion Square and Westminster
