= Holbox (restaurant) =

Mexican restaurant in Los Angeles, California, U.S.

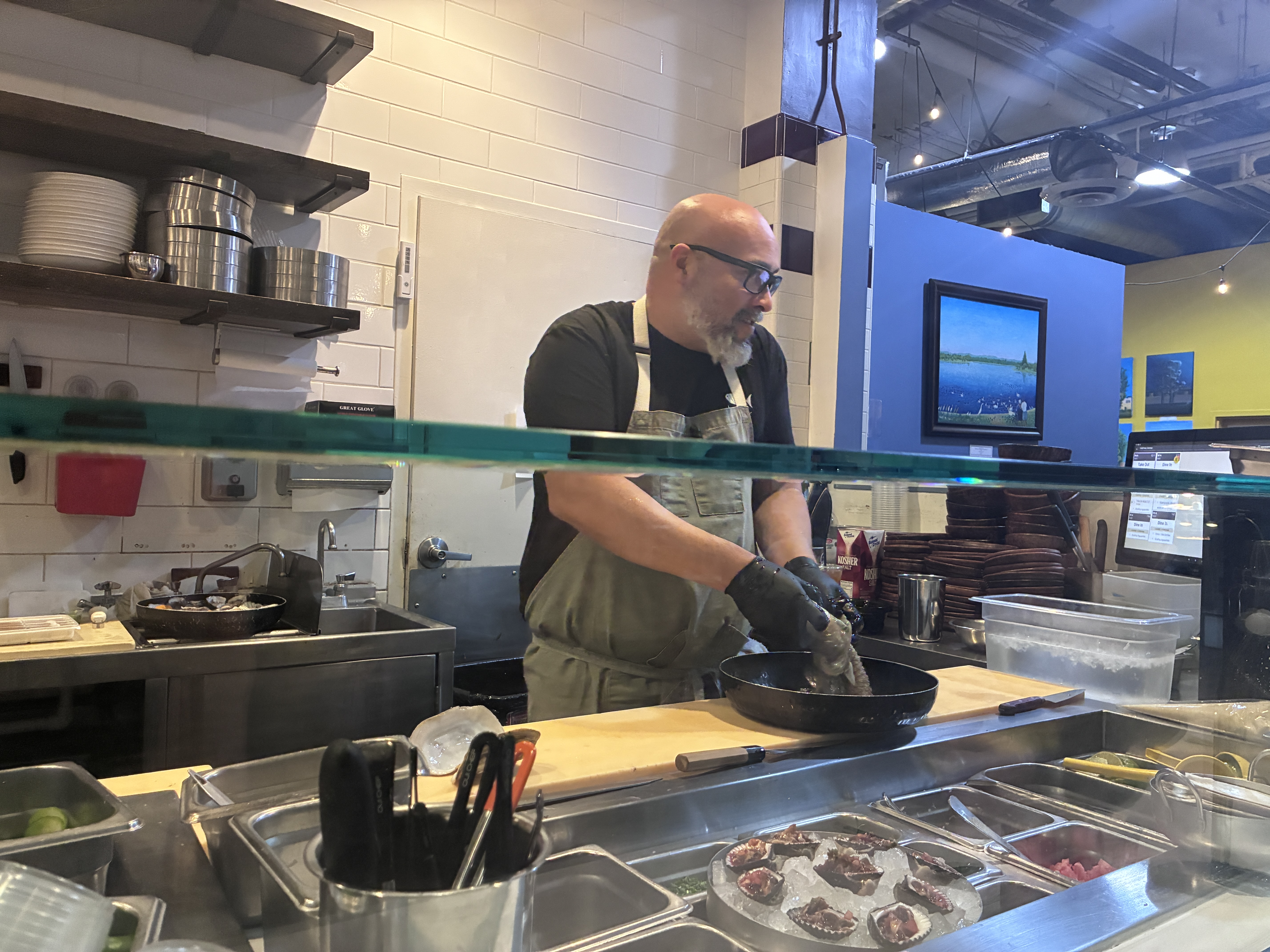
- Holbox chef Gilberto Centina Jr preparing geoduck for tasting menu
- Interactive map of Holbox

Restaurant information
- Established: 2017
- Owner: Gilberto Cetina
- Head chef: Gilberto Cetina
- Food type: Mexican
- Rating: (Michelin Guide)
- Location: 3655 S. Grand Avenue, Los Angeles, California, 90007, United States
- Coordinates: 34.0173°N 118.2784°W
- Website: holboxla.com

Holbox is a Mexican restaurant in South Los Angeles, California, United States. It was first awarded a Michelin star in 2024.

== Description ==
Holbox opened in early 2017. The restaurant is named for Isla Holbox, an island off the northern Yucatan Peninsula in Mexico. The founder and chef, Gilberto Centina, Jr. has said that he wanted the restaurant to express flavors from across coastal Mexico. The menu includes seafood such as aguachile, ceviche, and octopus tacos. It is located in the Mercado la Paloma, a non-profit community development food hall. Centina Jr.'s parents have a food stall near his at the Mercado la Paloma called Chichen Itza..

Holbox is known for its relationships with top-tier seafood suppliers and a focus on locally-available seafood. Guests order at the counter and then sit in the shared seating hall at Mercado la Paloma. Holbox also offers a tasting menu (also called an omakase by the Los Angeles Times two nights a week where up to eight patrons are seated at a bar.

== See also ==
- List of Mexican restaurants
- List of Michelin-starred restaurants in California
- List of seafood restaurants
