= Coulter's =

Department store in Los Angeles

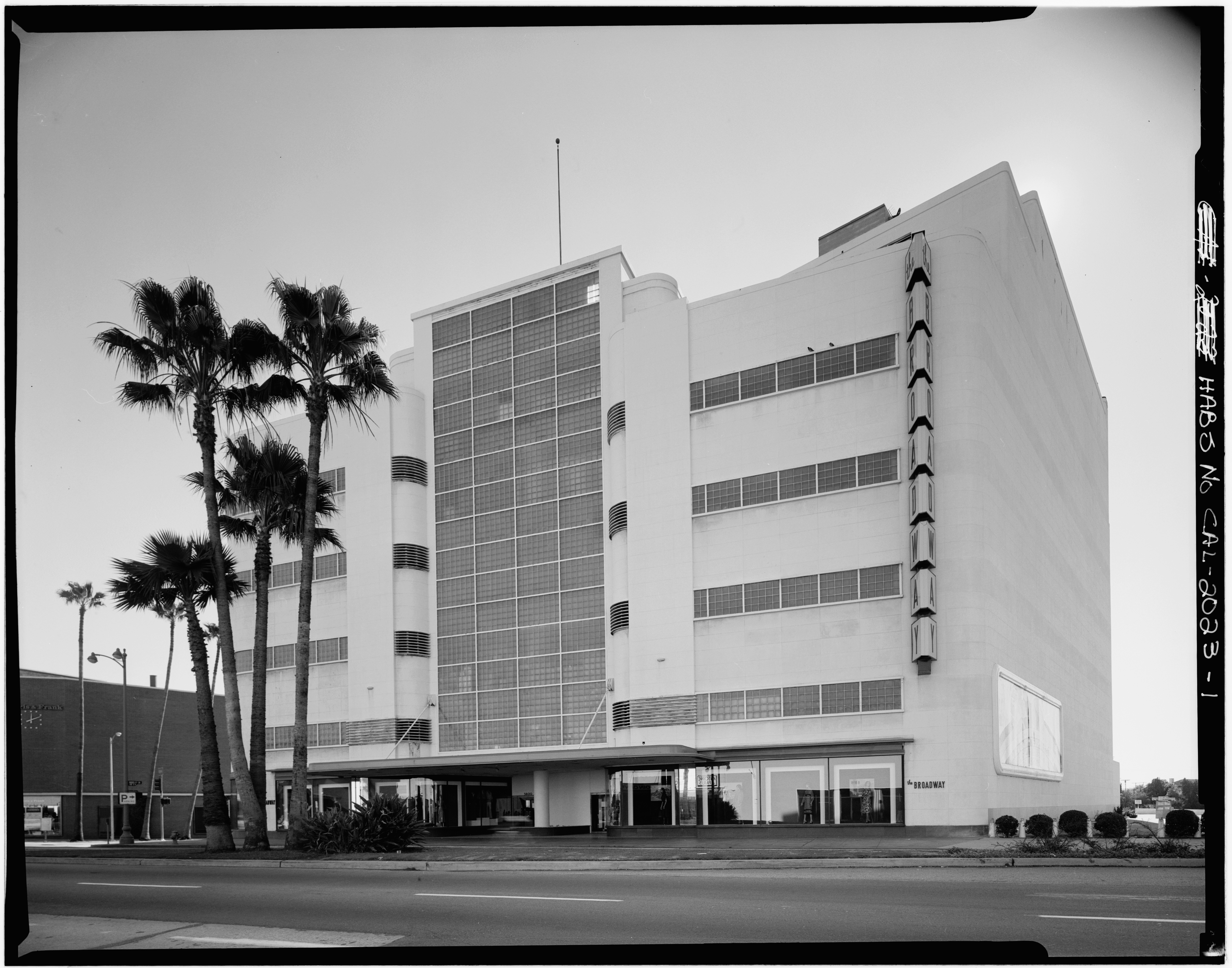
Coulter's final location on the Miracle Mile

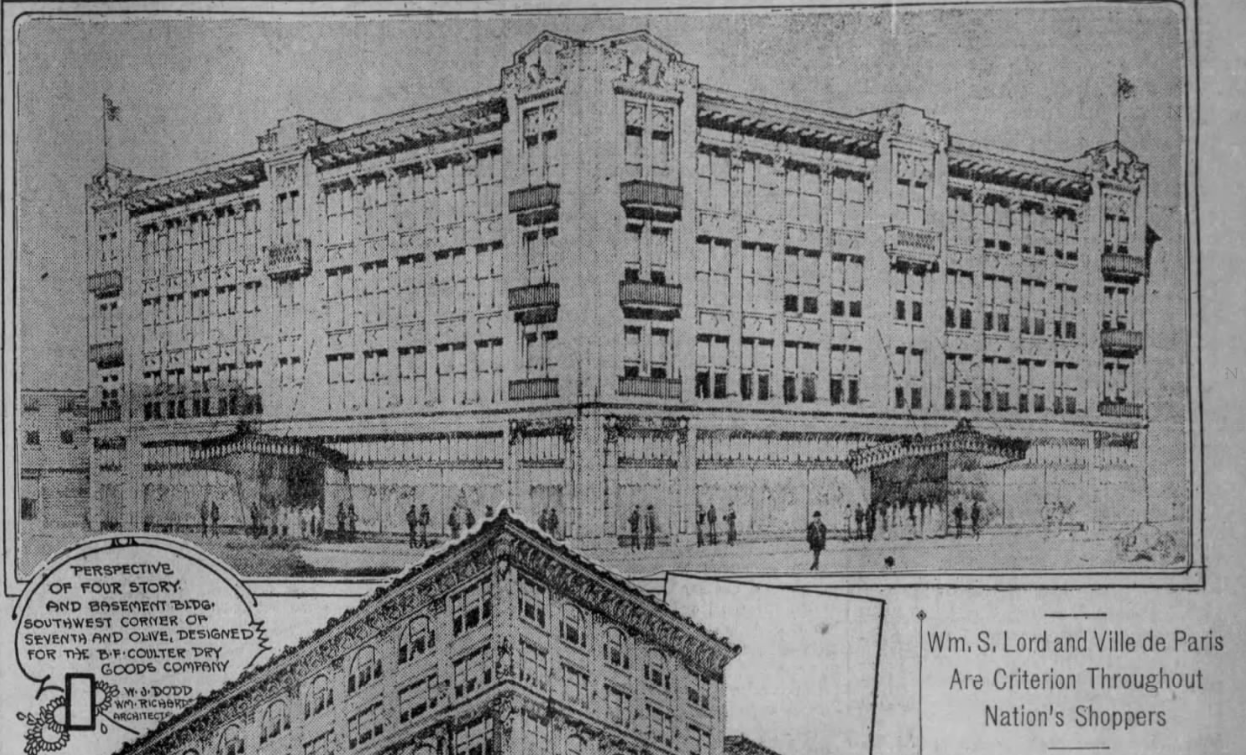
Coulter's new department store on Seventh Street, sketch from November 1918

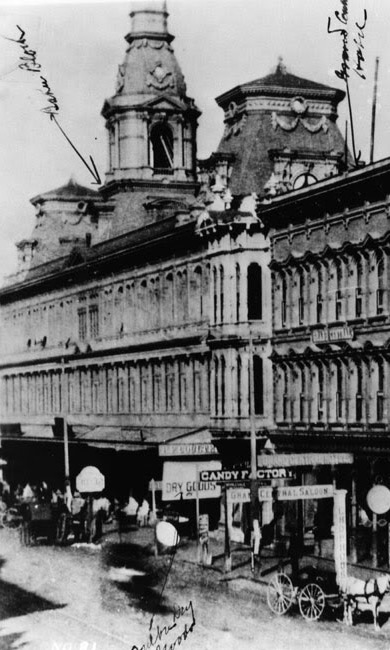
B. F. Coulter's Dry Goods (bottom center) in the Baker Block, N. Main Street at Arcadia, c. 1880

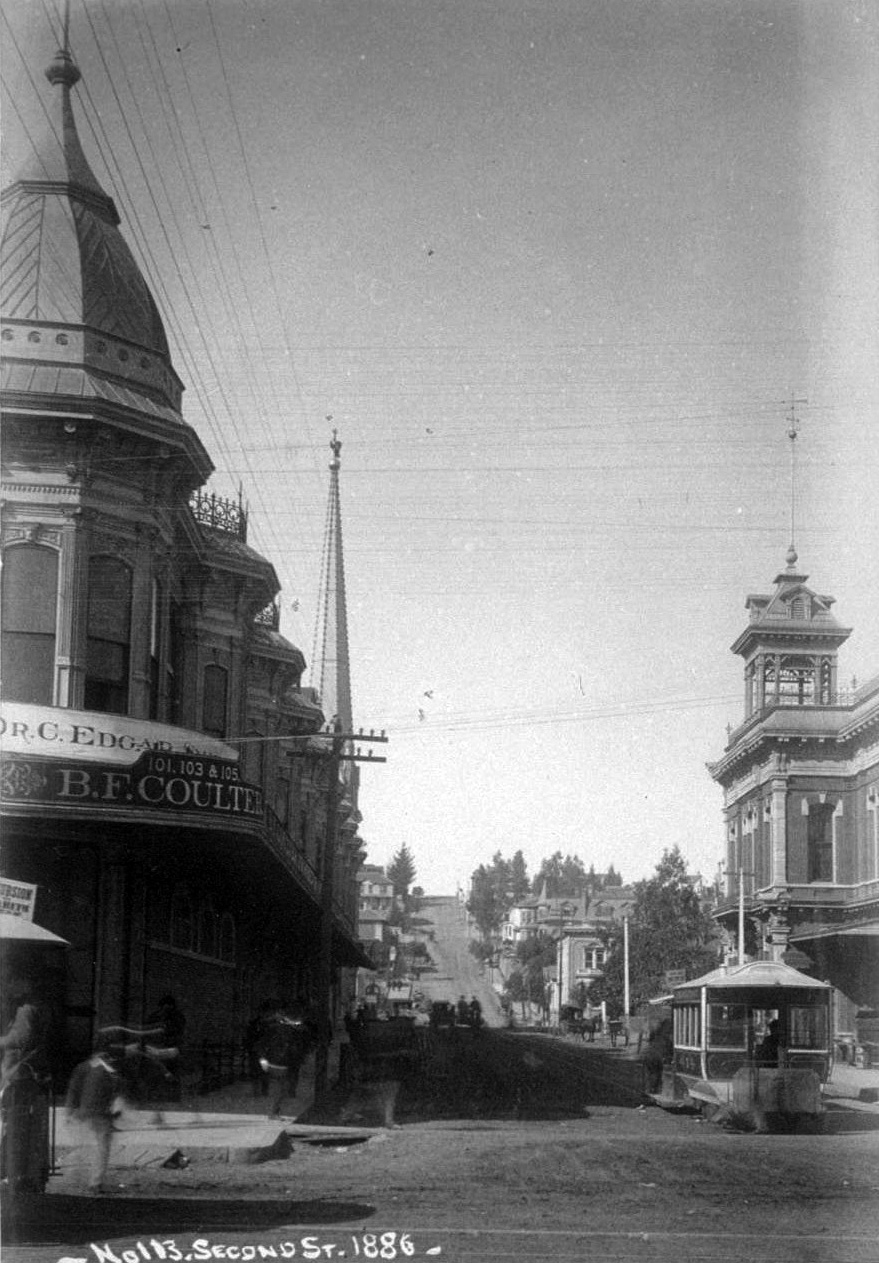
View west on 2nd at Spring. Coulter's in Hollenbeck Block (left) when it was only two stories; 2nd City Hall (right), 1886

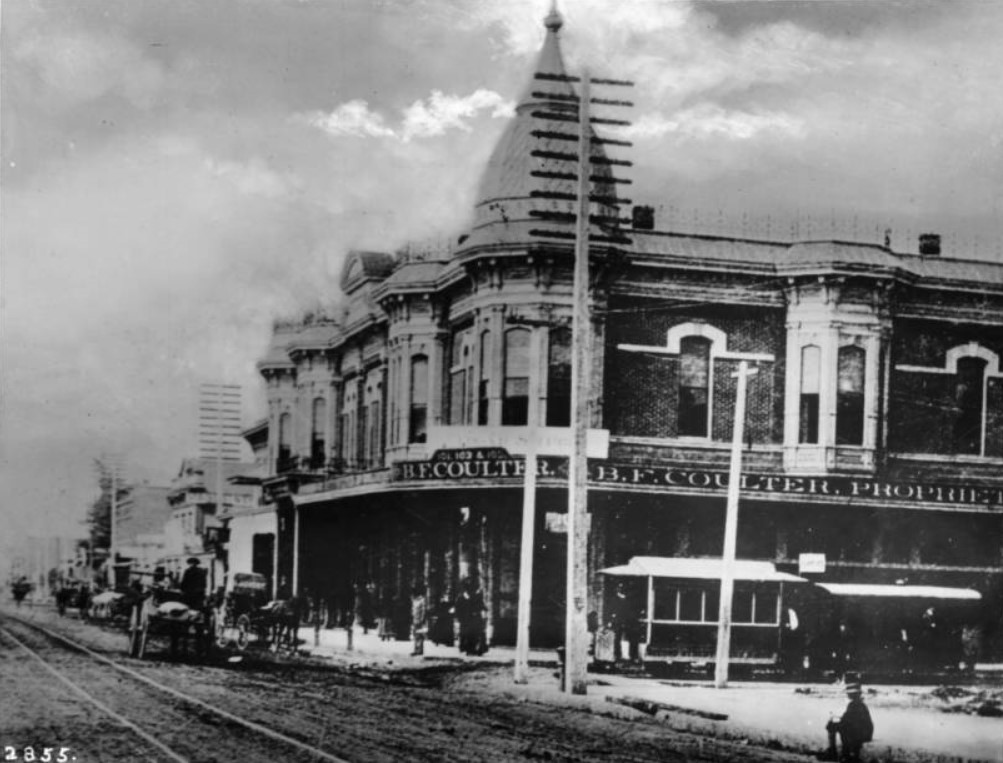
View south on Spring at 2nd, Coulter's in Hollenbeck Block when it was two stories, 1886

Coulter's was a department store that originated in Downtown Los Angeles and later moved to the Miracle Mile shopping district in that same city.

== History ==
Coulter's was founded by B. F. Coulter, a minister and entrepreneur from Kentucky, who joined the partnership Coulter & Harper in 1875, selling hardware, homeware and appliances, as well as underwear, at Eighth and Spring streets, moving to 110 Main Street in 1878.

On October 22, 1878, Coulter opened his own store in the Downey Block at the corner of Temple and Main streets, selling dry goods including "gentlemen's furnishings" including neckties, as well as ladies' cloaks, hosiery, and "dress goods". This first store measured 900 square feet (84 m^{2}) and held merchandise valued at $1,000 (~$1,476 in 2025).

Coulter's philosophy was to sell exceptional quality items at a fair price, but also with exceptional customer service. The store motto in ads was "the nicest store in Los Angeles". As was common with Los Angeles retailers of the time, Coulter moved the store's location several times, as the most desirable retail districts moved away from the Plaza.

In July, 1879, Coulter's moved to its second location, the Baker Block, 236 N. Main St., SE corner Main and Arcadia streets. It originally had one storefront and expanded into several more over time.

On November 1, 1884, Coulter's moved to its third location, the Hollenbeck Block, 201–205 N. Spring Street, claiming to be largest and best-lighted store in Southern California at the time. It had 3,000 square feet (280 m^{2}) gross retail space on the ground floor and an equal amount in the basement for wholesale trade.

In August, 1898, Coulter's moved to its fourth location, the Homer Laughlin Building, 317–325 S. Broadway. In 1905, Coulter's moved, the building was extended at the back through to Hill Street, and the Ville de Paris department store moved into the former Coulter's space. After Ville de Paris moved again, in 1917, the Grand Central Market moved into the space and occupies it to this day.

On May 31, 1905, Coulter's moved to its fifth location, a complex that renovated the Potomac Block and incorporated buildings adjacent to it: the new store's address was 225-7-9 S. Broadway and it went through to 224-6-8 S. Hill Street. Broadway was becoming the home of many large department stores such as J. W. Robinson's (1895), The Broadway (1896), Desmond's (1900), the Fifth Street Store (1905), Bullock's (1907), and Hamburger's (1908). When Coulter's left the space in 1917 it became home to the Western Shoe Company, which changed its name in 1922 to the Western Department Store, which operated there until 1928. Lettering covered the face of the building from top to bottom through the end of the 1950s: "THE LARGEST SHOE DEPT. IN THE WEST".

In 1917, Coulter's moved to its sixth location, fashionable Seventh Street, the new upmarket retail district often called "around the corner" - that is, west of the then-existing Broadway retail district, and south of Bunker Hill. Coulter's was at 711 S. Olive, the southwest corner of 7th and Olive. Coulter's maintained a branch store at 215 S. Broadway.

In 1938, it relocated to its seventh and final location on the Miracle Mile on Wilshire Boulevard. Again, unlike other stores that opened an additional branch on Wilshire, it moved its only store — its entire business — to Wilshire.

Coulter's was purchased by the Broadway chain in 1960 and became a Broadway branch.

== Miracle Mile building ==
The Streamline Moderne flagship store at 5600 Wilshire Boulevard, was designed by Stiles O. Clements and completed in 1938-39 was four stories high, as described by the Los Angeles Conservancy, "with a rounded exterior of white concrete and horizontal bands of glass block rather than proper windows. A dramatic seventy-two-foot-high panel of glass soared above the boulevard entrance".

The building was nominated for listing in the National Register of Historic Places but was demolished in 1980 before the nomination was heard.

The site remained - as the Conservancy described it — "a community eyesore for decades, with pools of tar and oil visible at the bottom of a deep pit" — it now a large mixed-use development.
