= Wise Company =

20th Century Department Store in Long Beach, California

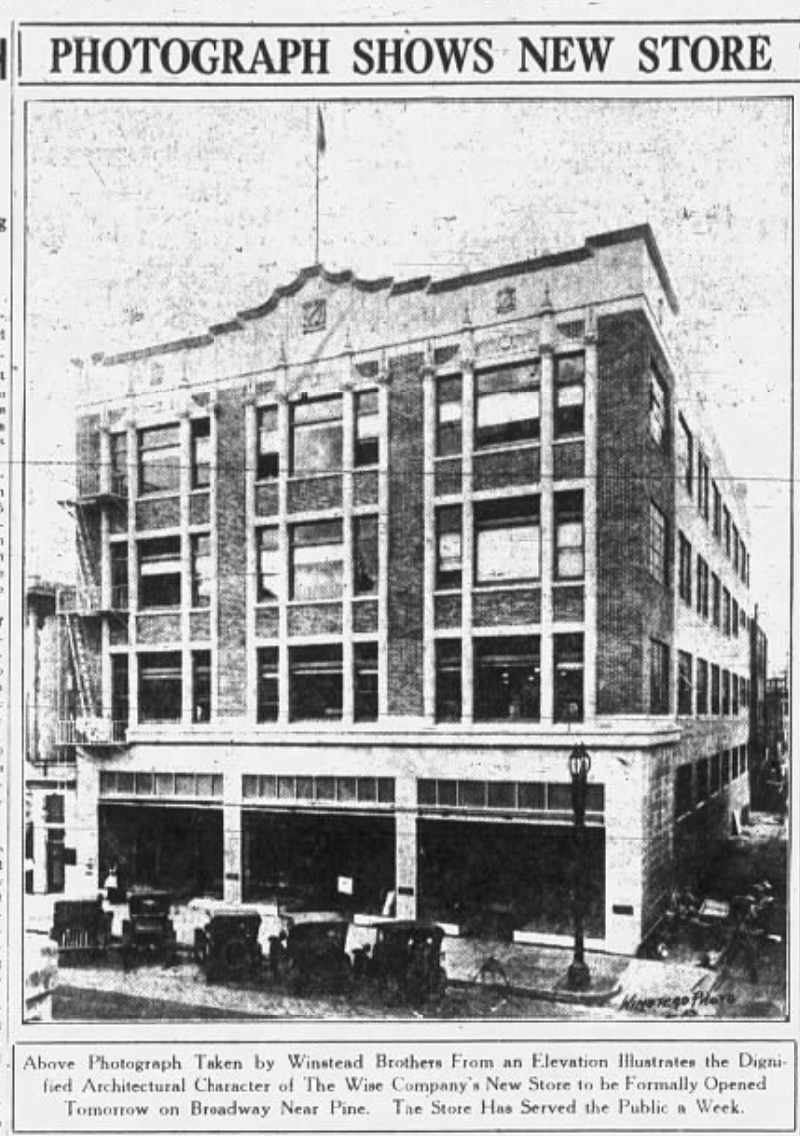
Photo of Wise Company 1925 store

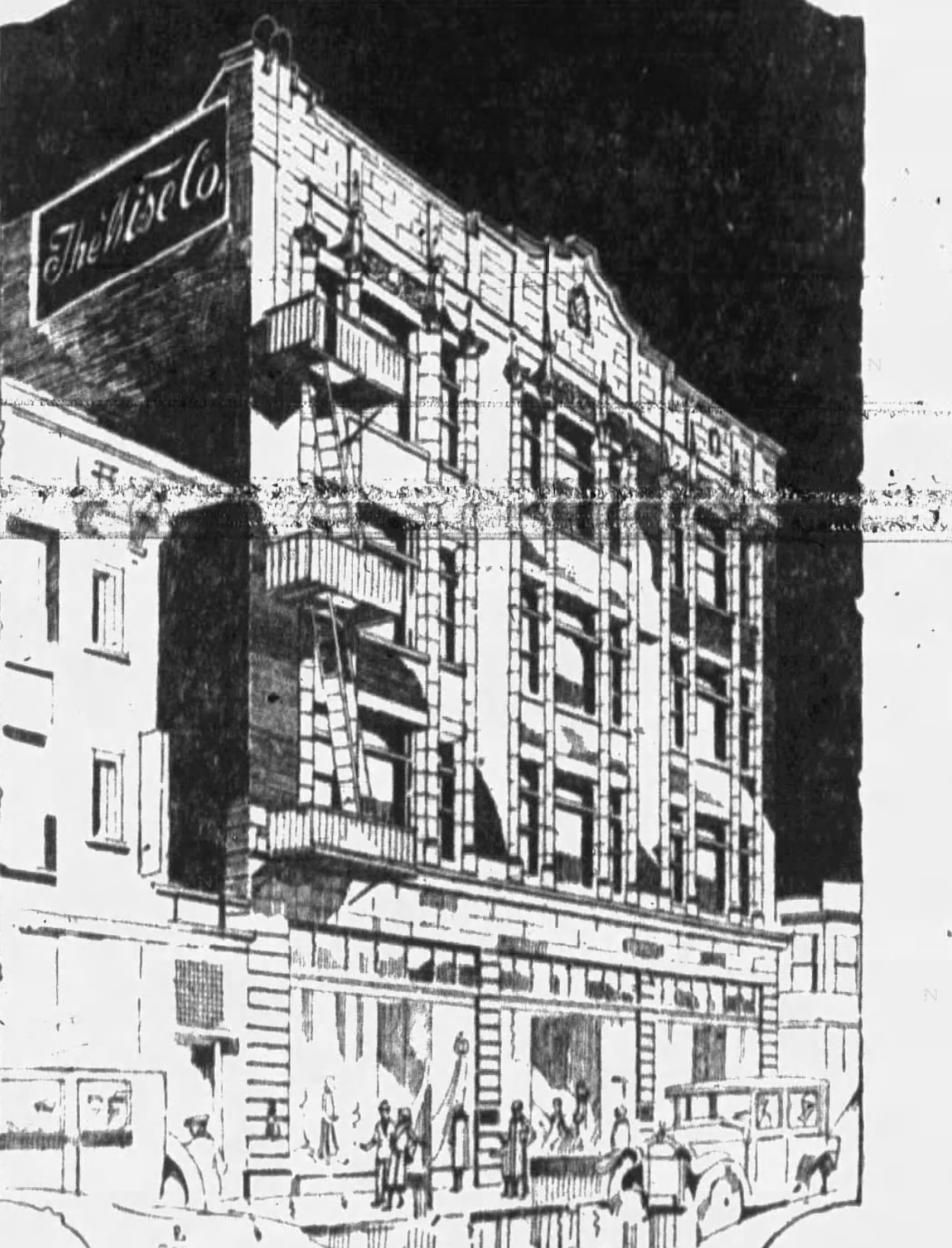
Sketch of Wise Company 1925 store

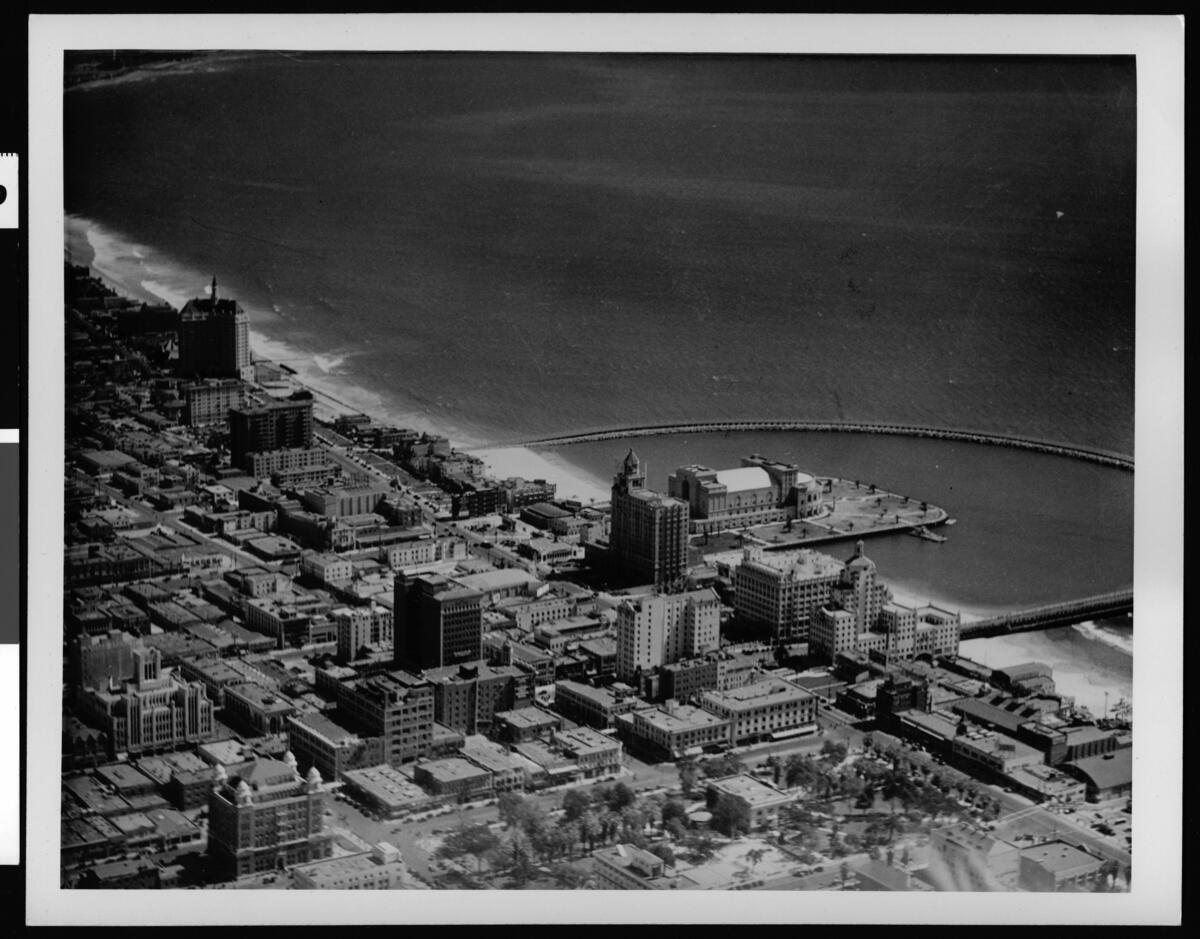
Long Beach in 1930. The Wise Company 1929 store can be seen at the left border, almost at the bottom. It has unadorned square edges topped by two square towers.

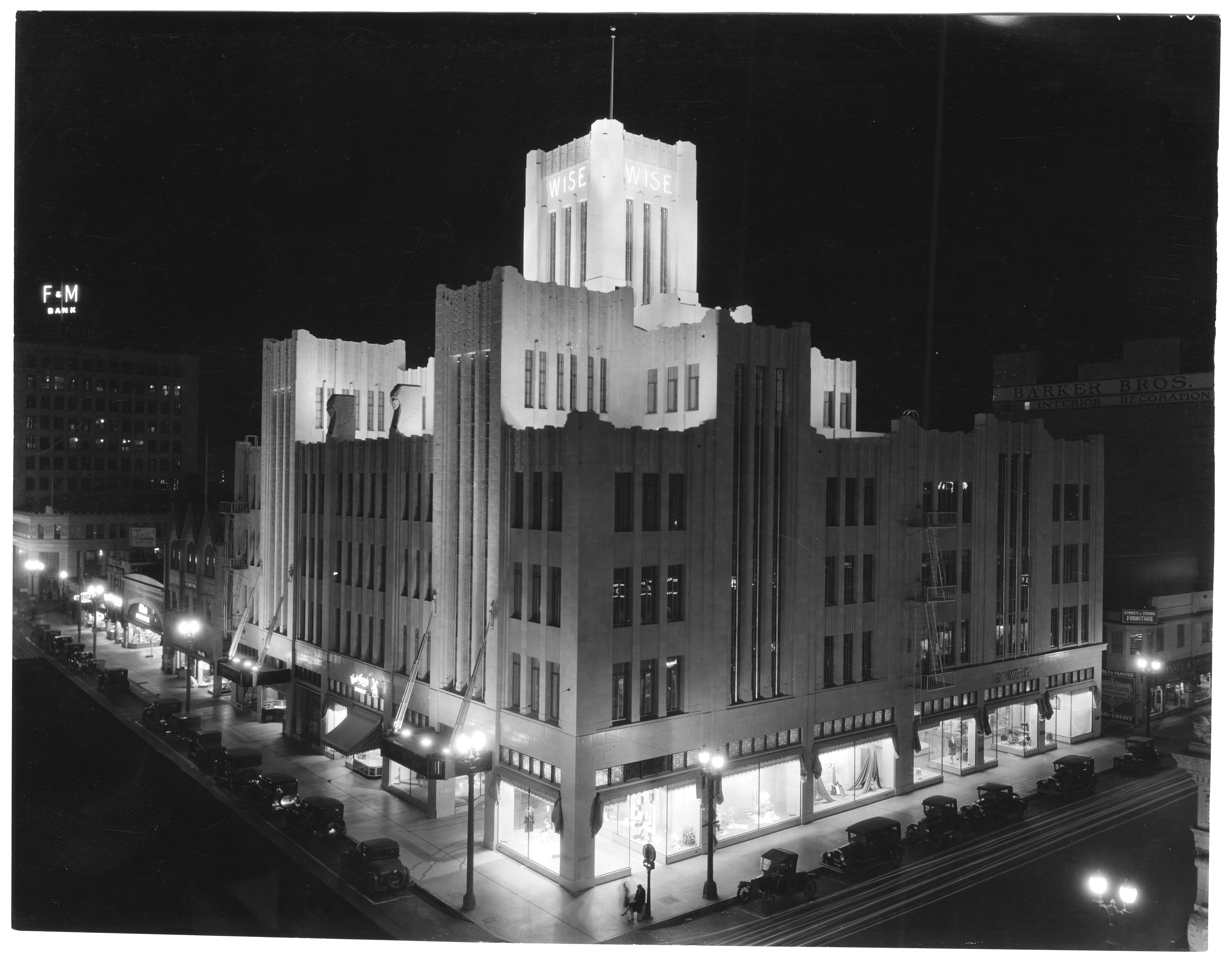
The Wise building at Broadway & Linden, c. 1932

The Wise Company (stylized The Wise Co., a.k.a. The Wise Store) was a department store in Long Beach, California founded in the early 1900s by W. H. ("Herb") Wise.

In 1894 Wise opened a grocery store at Cherry Ave. and Third Street in Long Beach. On July 28, 1902, he opened "The Cash Store" grocery in 27-by-75-foot (2,200 sq ft (200 m^{2})) quarters that W. H. Wise rented for $30/month at Pine and First street (later the site of the Bank of Italy). Wise offered the first grocery delivery by motor vehicle in Southern California, an early Oldsmobile "one-lunger". Wise added dry goods to his assortment, then removed groceries to deal exclusively in dry goods.

It moved to successively larger quarters: in 1906 to 333 Pine between Third and Fourth (later home to a Woolworth store). The Cash Store Co. added linens and furniture to its lines. In 1911, Wise moved to a larger location again, this time to Broadway west of Pine, where it would do business until December 2, 1925. In 1915 Wise doubled the size of the 1911 store.

== 1925 store ==
In that year 1925 Wise bought The Wall Company department store, changed the name of The Cash Store Co. to The Wise Company and on December 3, 1925, opened for business in new 57,000 sq ft (5,300 m^{2}) quarters at 113-123 Broadway (since razed), reported to have cost $500,000 (($8.96 million in 2024)). W. Horace Austin, its architect, who also designed competitor Buffums 1912 store and 1924 addition. The Long Beach Press-Telegram already called the 1925 building "splendid" and "one of the finest department stores on the Southern California Coast". Only a few years later, the Wise Company would impress Long Beach again and add to its growing civic pride.

== 1929 Building ==
On October 5, 1929, it opened a new building 216 Pine Avenue, adjacent to and immediately west of its 1925 store, at the northeast corner of Broadway, in art deco style with six stories and 150 ft (46 m) of frontage on each street, for a total of 135,000 sq ft (12,500 m^{2}) of total floor area, of which four floors (90,000 sq ft (8,400 m^{2})) were dedicated to merchandising.

The building harmonized with and formed an addition to, the existing Wise Co. building, which had been opened only four years earlier in 1925. A Van de Kamp's Holland Dutch Bakery store operated in the Wise Co. store.

== Closing and epilogue ==
Wise closed his department store and retired in 1934, after which the building was mostly empty for decades. Montgomery Ward operated for a time in the eastern (1925) portion of the store, but closed its store there in 1958.

=== For decades, a "blot on Downtown Long Beach" ===
Buffums department store, the Independent and the Press-Telegram newspapers saw the prominent nearly-empty building as a negative influence on the overall economic health of the retail core and central business district in general.

As Buffums put it in 1960:

We have had truly wonderful neighbors all of our 56 years on the southwest corner of Pine and Broadway, excepting only… the Wise Building since out close friend and fine competitor Herb Wise retired from retailing some 26 years ago. The almost disgraceful misuse of the fine structure carrying his respected name over the last quarter century has proved an utter waste of an excellent property and a blot on all Downtown Long Beach

=== Syndicate to gain control of the building ===
The building had multiple owners at that point. Claude John owned the eastern (1925) part and National Dollar Stores owned the western (1929) part. John sold to Belcher Investments, who formed a syndicate with Buffums and the two newspapers and gained an option agreement with National Dollar Stores which would give them control over the western portion should they find a major retail anchor tenant for the building. However, despite spending $81,105 by April 1960 (($862,049 in 2024)), they failed to find one.

By that time, most retail growth had shifted to the suburbs. In particular, the Lakewood Center had opened in 1952 at the northern edge of the City of Long Beach. May Company California, which operated Downtown Los Angeles' largest department store, taking up a full city block and with more than one million square feet of floor space, had opened a 347,000-square-foot (32,200 m^{2}) branch at Lakewood, the world's largest suburban department store at that time. May Company Lakewood alone was larger than Downtown Long Beach's Buffums, which in the first half of the twentieth century had been such a protagonist of civic pride.

=== Library option ===
In June 1960 Long Beach citizens voted on Measure C: whether a new library should be housed in the Wise Building. Buffums expressed strong support for this option. Another option was for Long Beach to issue bonds to finance a new library building in the Long Beach Civic Center, which won over the Wise Building option.

=== Current status ===
The building still exists in Downtown Long Beach and has been refaced with glass and steel. The two square towers that once topped the building are no longer present.

== Herb Wise ==
In addition to growing and running his retail business, W. H. "Herb" Wise had served as the head of the Long Beach Merchants' Association and of its Rotary Club.
