= Mercado la Paloma =

Food court in Los Angeles

Coordinates: 34.0174°N 118.2784°W

Mercado la Paloma is a food court and community meeting space in the Figueroa Corridor of Los Angeles.

It was created in 1999 by Esperanza Community Housing, a nonprofit organization that works to promote affordable housing, accessible health care, and economic and community development. The development began with around eight families proposing concepts for a family-run restaurant. Many or most of the food stalls at Mercado la Paloma are local, family-run restaurants. The nonprofit resisted advice to have a national chain food brand such as Ben & Jerry's as one of the stalls, and all the food stalls are locally-owned.

Mercado la Paloma's ground floor has a large communal seating area. Each food stall has its own kitchen. The second floor provides space for nonprofits, including Esperanza's health programs.. There are also community meeting spaces.

Mercado la Paloma is the home of Michelin-starred Mexican seafood restaurant Holbox, founded by Gilberto Cetina Jr. Cetina Jr.'s parents run one of the original food stalls at Mercado la Paloma, Chichen Itza..

It is located at 3655 S. Grand Ave., near the campus of The University of Southern California.

== See also ==
Grand Central Market - food hall in downtown Los Angeles
