= Potomac Block =

Coordinates: 34°3′7.5″N 118°14′51″W

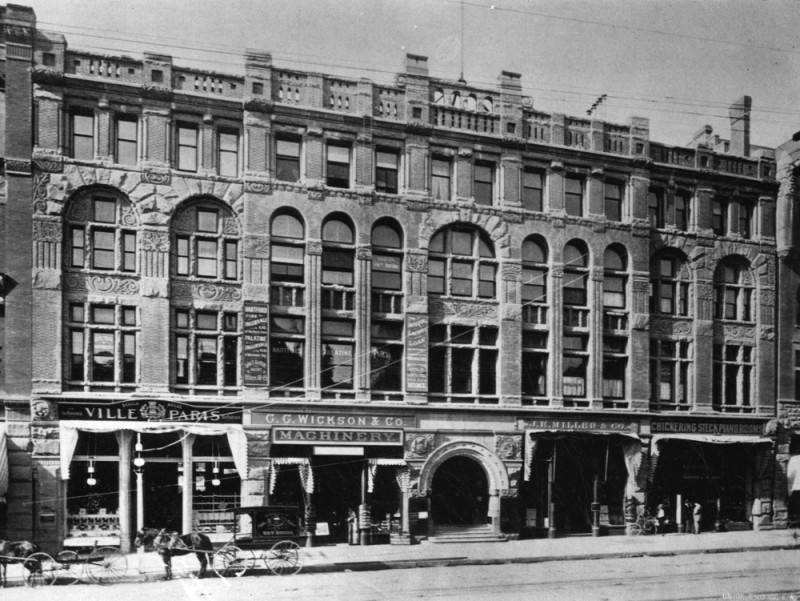
Potomac Block, W side of Broadway between 2nd and 3rd, 1890s

Potomac Block was a commercial building with a historical role in the retail history of Los Angeles, at 213–223 S. Broadway in Downtown Los Angeles, on the west side of Broadway between 2nd and 3rd streets. It was developed by lumberyard and mill owner J. M. Griffith, designed in 1888 by Block, Curlett and Eisen in Romanesque architectural style and opened on July 17, 1890. Tenants included Ville de Paris, and City of London Dry Goods Co. It was the first time major retail stores opened on South Broadway, in what would be a shift of the shopping district from 1890 to 1905, from the 1880s-1890s central business district around Spring, Main, First and Temple streets to S. Broadway, and ever further south along Broadway.

In 1904 Coulter's bought the building and combined it with a building to the south and at the back (facing Hill St.), renovated and combined them into one, opening it as a 157,000 sq ft (14,600 m^{2}) new store in June 1905.

The building was demolished in 1953.
