= Homer Laughlin Building =

Downtown Los Angeles landmark building with Grand Central Market

- U.S. Historic district – Contributing property
- Los Angeles Historic-Cultural Monument
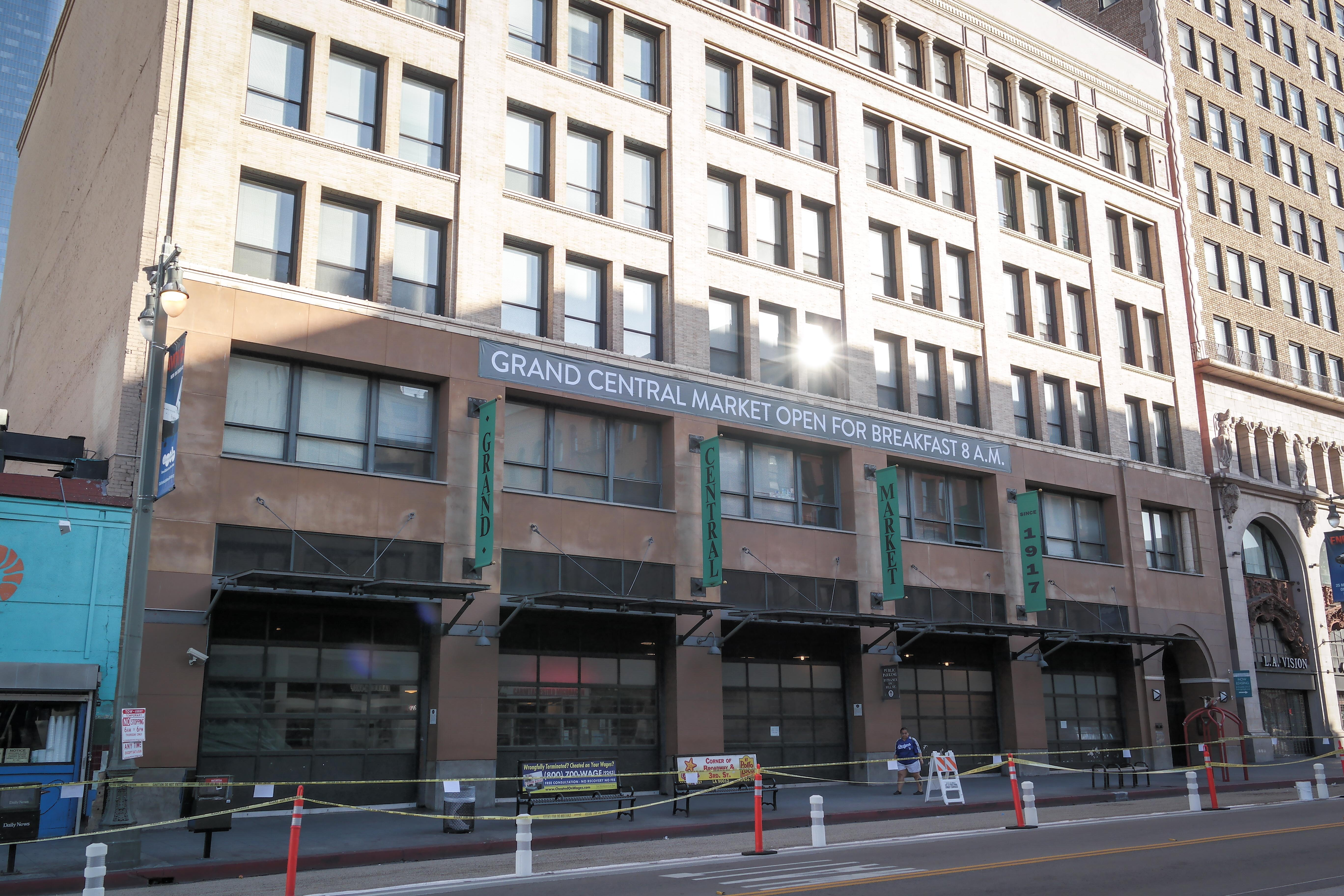
- The building in 2014

- Location within the Los Angeles metropolitan area
- Location: 317 South Broadway, Los Angeles
- Coordinates: 34°03′03″N 118°14′56″W
- Built: 1897, 1905
- Built by: Smith & Carr
- Architect: John B. Parkinson (1897); Thornton Fitzhugh or Harrison Albright (1905 addition)
- Part of: Broadway Theater and Commercial District (ID79000484)
- LAHCM No.: 1183

Significant dates
- Designated CP: May 9, 1979
- Designated LAHCM: July 2, 2019

The Homer Laughlin Building, at 317 South Broadway in downtown Los Angeles, is a landmark building best known for its ground floor tenant the Grand Central Market, the city's largest and oldest public market.

== History ==
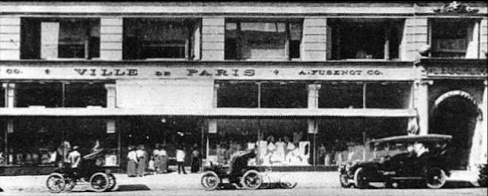
Ville de Paris department store in the Homer Laughlin Building, 1904

Built by retired Ohio entrepreneur Homer Laughlin (founder of the Homer Laughlin China Company), the Homer Laughlin Building was Los Angeles's first fireproofed, steel-reinforced structure. The original six-story building was designed in 1896 by architect John B. Parkinson. Smith & Carr were the building contractors. In August 1898 Coulter's Dry Goods (later department store) opened here.

In 1905, the structure was expanded through to Hill Street, called either the Laughlin Annex or the Lyon Building. This addition, the first reinforced concrete building in Los Angeles, was designed by either Harrison Albright or Thornton Fitzhugh. The first post-expansion tenant was the Ville de Paris department store, replaced in 1917 by the Grand Central Market, which still occupies the ground floor of the building. The location was chosen because of its proximity to the Angels Flight Railway allowing for easy access to the well-to-do citizens of Bunker Hill.

In the 1920s the building served as an office for the American architect Frank Lloyd Wright.

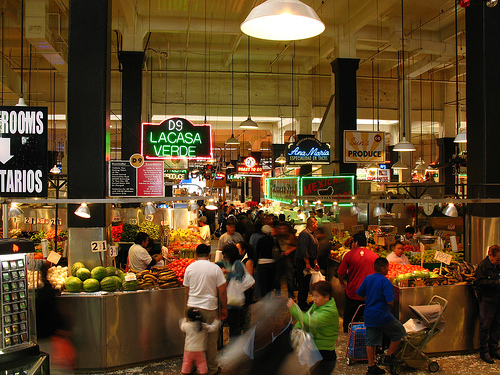
Grand Central Market

The original building was built in the Beaux Arts style, but subsequent modifications drastically changed its appearance including the addition of a tile façade in the 1960s which hid the second-story windows. Along with the adjacent Million Dollar Theater Building and the Bradbury Building, the Homer Laughlin Building and the Grand Central Market underwent a major renovation in the 1990s under the direction of developer Ira Yellin and architect Brenda Levin. As part of the rehabilitation residential units were added, creating downtown Los Angeles's first true mixed-use developments in decades.

In 2013, under the leadership of Ira Yellin's widow, Adele Yellin, the Market began welcoming a new wave of vendors who are transforming the nearly century-old food arcade into a major culinary destination. The ongoing revitalization of the iconic food arcade has garnered numerous media accolades including being named one of the “Hot 10” restaurants nationwide by Bon Appetit magazine in 2014.

=== Historic designation ===
In 1979, Los Angeles's Broadway Theater and Commercial District was added to the National Register of Historic Places, with Grand Central Market listed as a contributing property in the district. In 2019, the building was designated Los Angeles Historic-Cultural Monument No. 1183.

== See also ==
- List of contributing properties in the Broadway Theater and Commercial District
- List of Los Angeles Historic-Cultural Monuments in Downtown Los Angeles
