= Ville de Paris (department store) =

Department store in Los Angeles, California

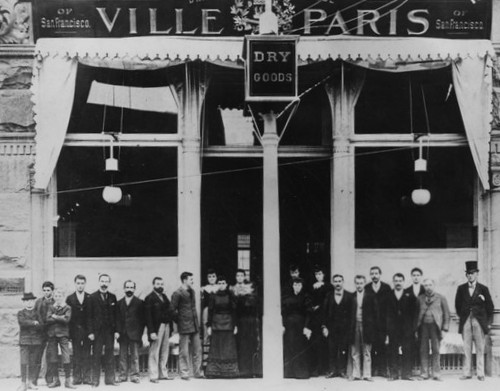
Ville de Paris department store, Broadway btw. 2nd/3rd, 1901. Now a parking lot.

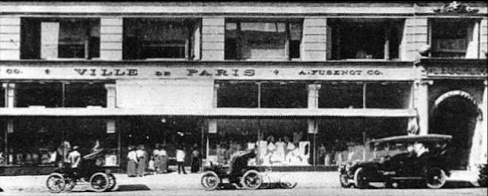
Ville de Paris department store, Homer Laughlin Building on Broadway btw. 3rd/4th. Now Grand Central Market, probably late 1905

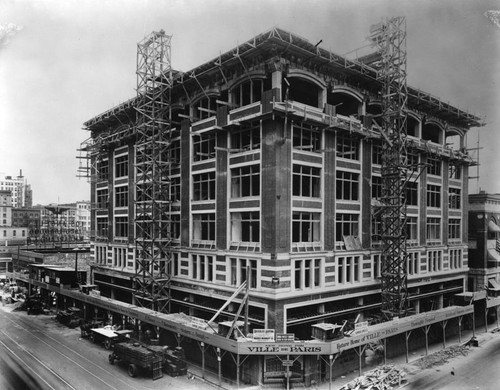
Ville de Paris department store, Seventh & Olive, 1916

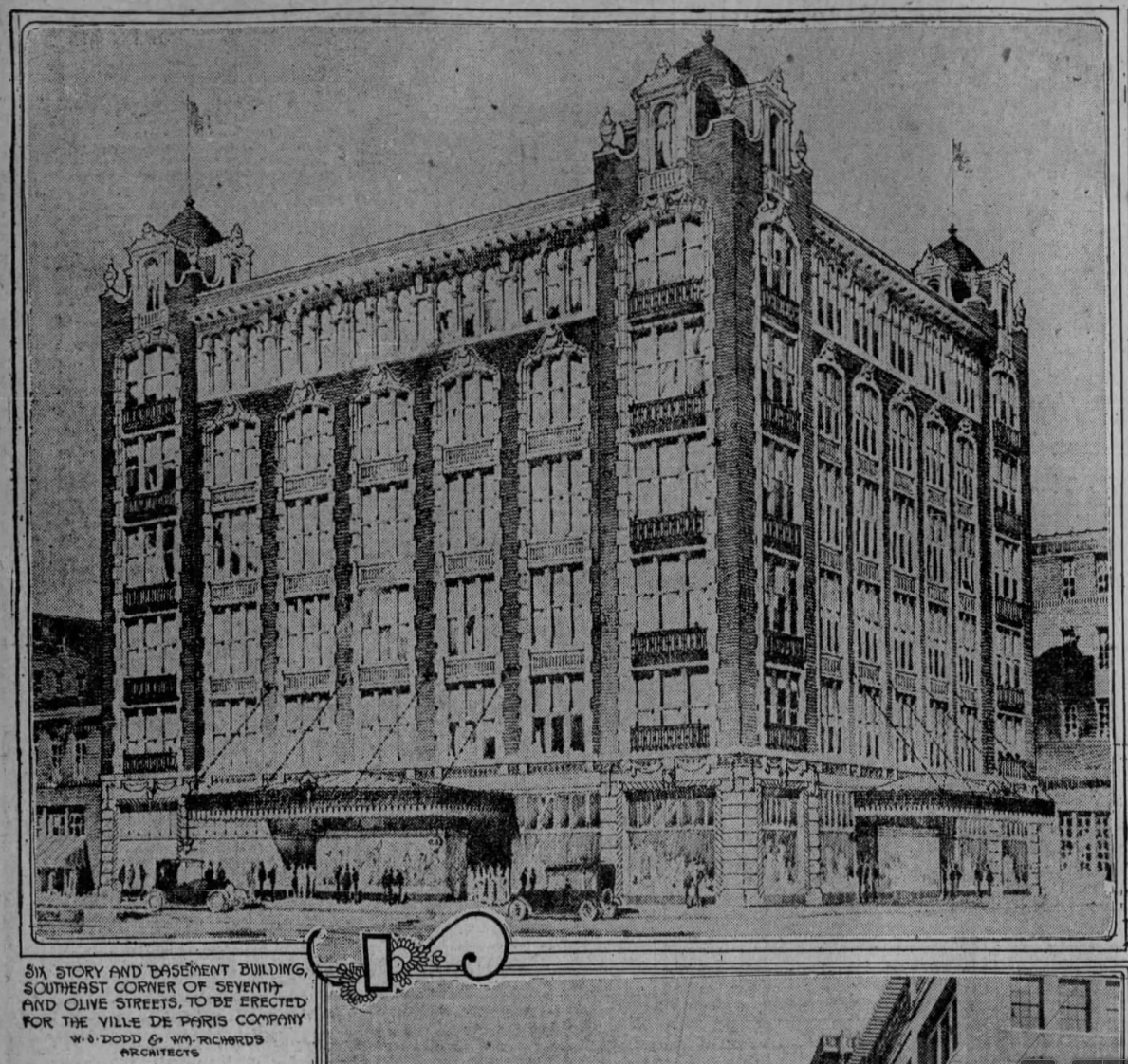
New Ville de Paris department store on Seventh Street, sketch from November 1918

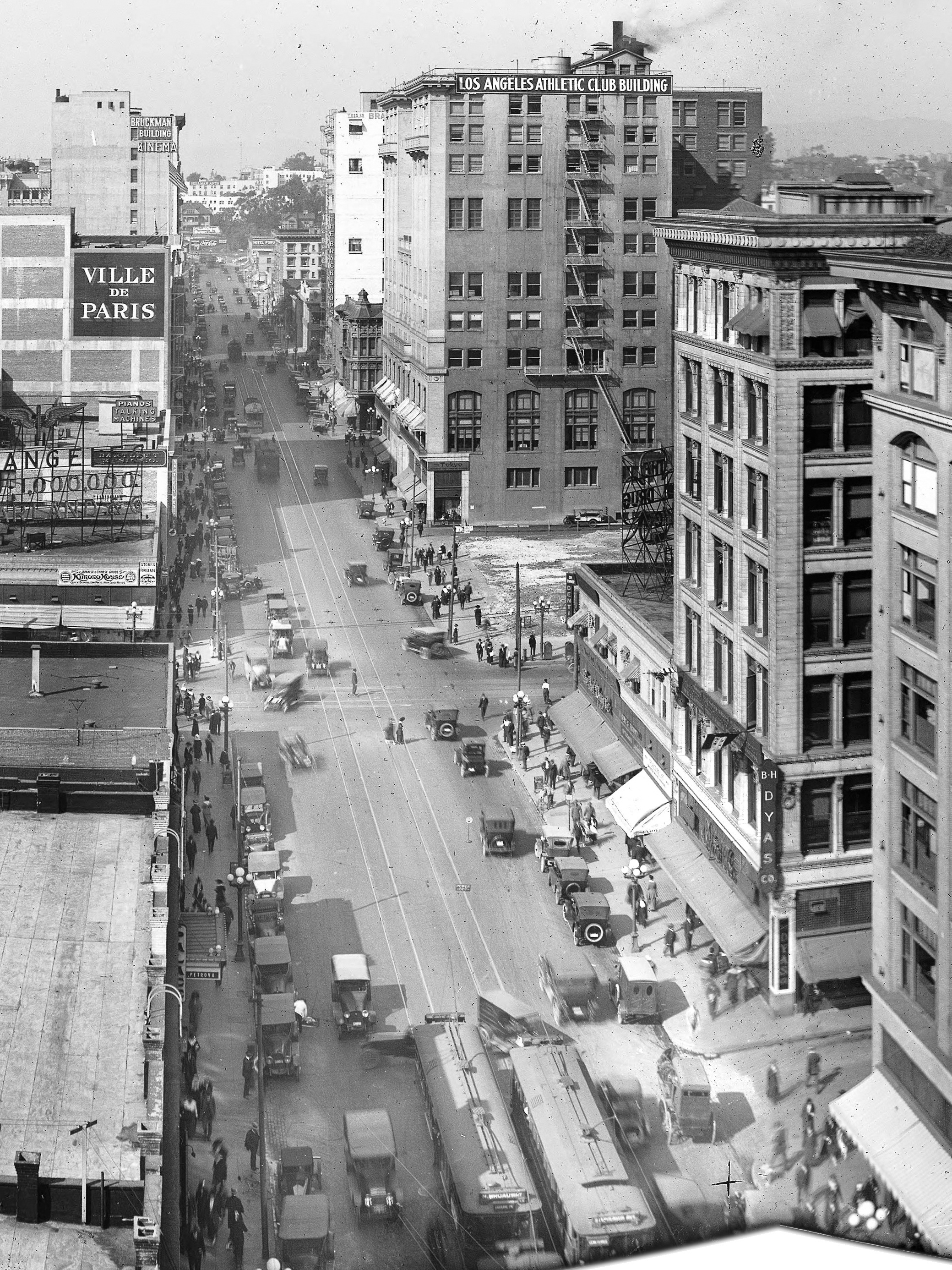
Seventh Street looking west from Broadway, 1917. Bullocks building is at the far right. B. H. Dyas sporting goods store is visible right and Ville de Paris, before Dyas bought it, visible left.

Ville de Paris was a department store in Downtown Los Angeles from 1893 through 1919.

A. Fusenot's Ville de Paris Los Angeles store should not be confused with the unrelated City of Paris store operating in Los Angeles through 1897 operated by Eugene Meyer & Co., then by Stern, Cahn & Loeb; nor with the much more famous City of Paris Dry Goods Co. of San Francisco.

== History ==
French emigre Auguste Fusenot (French Consul in Los Angeles from 1898 to 1907) arrived in the U.S. in 1873 and soon became a partner in San Francisco's City of Paris store. After learning the business, he founded the Ville de Paris in Los Angeles in 1893. It was operated by the A. Fusenot Co. as a dry goods store. It was located in the Potomac Block at 221–223 S. Broadway between 2nd and 3rd Streets, at a time when most stores were located in the Central Business District around Spring, Main, First and Temple Streets. The original store measured 3,000 square feet (280 m^{2}).

In the latter half of 1905, the store relocated to a space 32 times larger, (96,000 square feet (8,900 m^{2})), formerly the premises of Coulter's, a block away in the Homer Laughlin Building, at 317–325 S. Broadway, extending all the way back through to 314–322 Hill Street. This is the current site of Grand Central Market.

In 1907, Auguste Fusenot died and brother Georges took over management of the store. In 1915, Fusenot sold his business to the owners of The Emporium in San Francisco, and in 1917 the Ville de Paris removed to 7th and Olive Streets, after J. W. Robinson's opened their flagship store on 7th Street, many blocks to the west of Broadway. The area would become the downtown's upscale shopping district for several decades. The space on Broadway has since been occupied by the Grand Central Market.

In 1919 the owners sold the 7th and Olive store to B. H. Dyas, and then the store became B. H. Dyas Co., which itself closed around 1930. The Seventh and Olive building was then occupied by the Los Angeles Jewelry Mart, a constituent of what is now the Jewelry District, part of the Historic Core district.
