= Grand Central Market =

Public market in Downtown Los Angeles

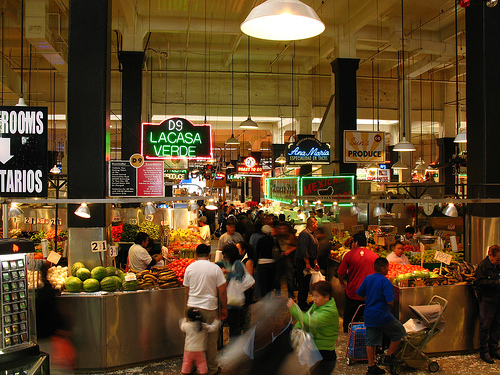
- Grand Central Market
- Interactive map of the Grand Central Market area

General information
- Location: 317 S Broadway, Los Angeles, California, United States
- Coordinates: 34.050812°N 118.249063°W
- Opened: October 1917

Website
- grandcentralmarket.com

Los Angeles Historic-Cultural Monument
- Designated: July 2, 2019
- Reference no.: 1183

The Grand Central Market is a historic public market in downtown Los Angeles, California. It has been in continuous operation since its opening in 1917, housed within the Homer Laughlin Building. The market features dozens of food vendors and serves as both a cultural and culinary hub which sees 2 million visitors annually.

== History ==
The Grand Central Market opened in October 1917, taking up the entire ground floor of the Homer Laughlin Building. It was promoted at that time as “the largest and finest public market on the Pacific Coast.” The market replaced the previous tenant, the Ville de Paris department store, which vacated in 1917. At the time, it primarily served wealthier patrons who took the Angels Flight Railway from Bunker Hill. The "Wonder Market" as it was then called, "featured everything from fish, oysters and meat to the finest produce from farmers across the Southland. Shoppers could also find stalls with eggs and butter, bakeries, delicatessens, candy shops, florists, specialty goods and lunch counters." By 1926, the market's 120 stalls received around forty thousand customers daily, served by shopkeepers of various nationalities.

As the demographics of the surrounding area shifted in the latter half of the 20th century, the market saw a drastic change in its customer base and vendors. The market began to sell more low-cost groceries after the economic decline of post-WWII downtown and the opening of new supermarkets and farmers markets in L.A. caused it to take on a smaller footprint of 52 stalls by 1968. In 1978, the L.A. Times estimated that around half of the 180,000 weekly shoppers at the market were of Latino descent. In 1985, it was estimated that food stamp purchases made up 20 percent of sales at the market.

The market was bought by Beverly Hills attorney Ira Yellin in 1985 who led restoration and preservation efforts of the market. Restoration projects included removing mid-century additions (such as a tile façade covering the second story windows), restoring original Beaux Arts architectural details, installing vintage and new neon signs, and generally reviving the space. After the Great Recession the market began to struggle, seeing vacancy rates as high as 45%. Beginning around 2012, under the leadership of Yellin's widow, Adele, the market saw renewed investment and a push to combine legacy vendors with trendier food-concept stalls. This included bringing in eateries like EggSlut, Sticky Rice, Wexler’s Deli, and others.

In 2017, the market was sold to Langdon Street Capital, headed by Adam Daneshgar, for an undisclosed sum. The new ownership pledged to make maintenance and “surgical” improvements while preserving the market’s character.

== Appearances in TV and film ==
As a historic and cultural site of downtown Los Angeles, the market has made several appearances in film. It was the site of a lengthy chase and shootout in the comedy/action flick Busting (1974). Bail bondsman Eddie Moscone (Joe Pantoliano) convinces bounty hunter Jack Walsh (Robert De Niro) to track down accountant/embezzler Jonathan Mardukas (Charles Grodin) over breakfast there at the beginning of Midnight Run (1988). Gy. Sgt. James Dunn (Keenen Ivory Wayans) takes refuge in the emporium at the end of the thriller Most Wanted (1997). Seth (Nicolas Cage) and Dr. Maggie Rice (Meg Ryan) shop for produce there in the drama City of Angels (1998).

== See also ==
- Mercado la Paloma
