= Weeks and Day =

Former American architectural firm

Weeks and Day was an American architectural firm founded in 1916 by architect Charles Peter Weeks (1870–1928) and engineer William Peyton Day (1886–1966). The firm worked throughout California but mainly in the San Francisco Bay Area, and many of their works are listed in the National Register of Historic Places.

== History ==
Weeks was born in Copley, Ohio, educated in the atelier of Victor Laloux at the École des Beaux-Arts from 1892 to 1895, and briefly partnered with John Galen Howard. Day partnered with San Francisco reinforced concrete engineer John B. Leonard.

Weeks and Day partnered in 1916, Weeks as designer and Day as engineer. The firm specialized in live and movie theaters, and designed several movie palaces, mostly in the San Francisco Bay Area but also in Los Angeles and San Diego. They also designed numerous hotels and other buildings.

Weeks and Day was most active immediately before Weeks' death in 1928. Day continued the firm after Week's death, with the firm ultimately closing in 1953.

== List of works ==
=== National Register of Historic Places ===
==== In San Francisco ====
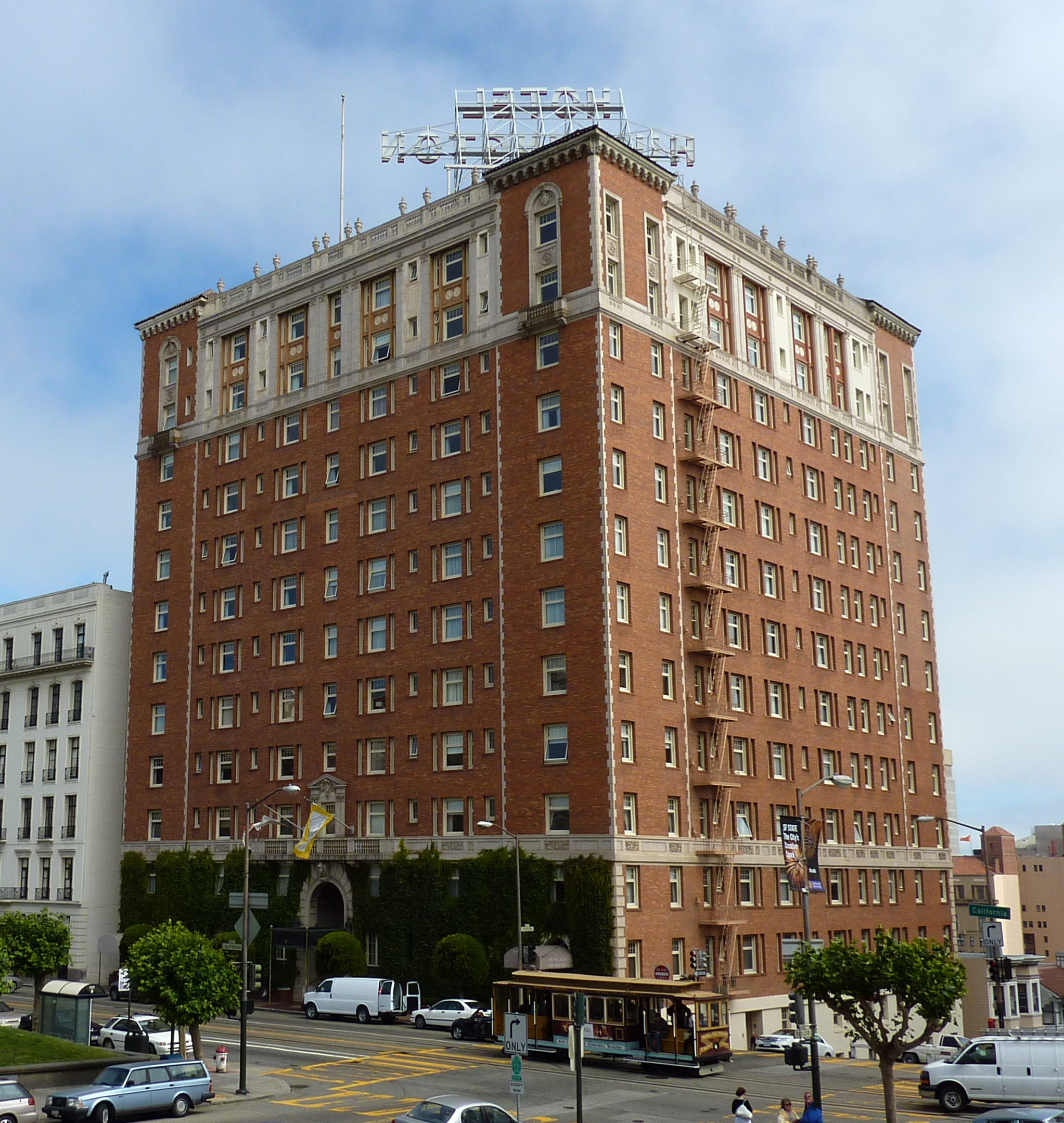
Huntington Apartments

- Baker and Hamilton Building (1905), Weeks and Sutton
- Don Lee Cadillac Building (1921)
- Huntington Apartments (1922)
- Treasure Island Administration Building (1938), Day and Kelham
- Treasure Island Hall of Transportation (1938), Day and Kelham
- Palace of Fine and Decorative Arts (1938), Day and Kelham

==== Elsewhere ====
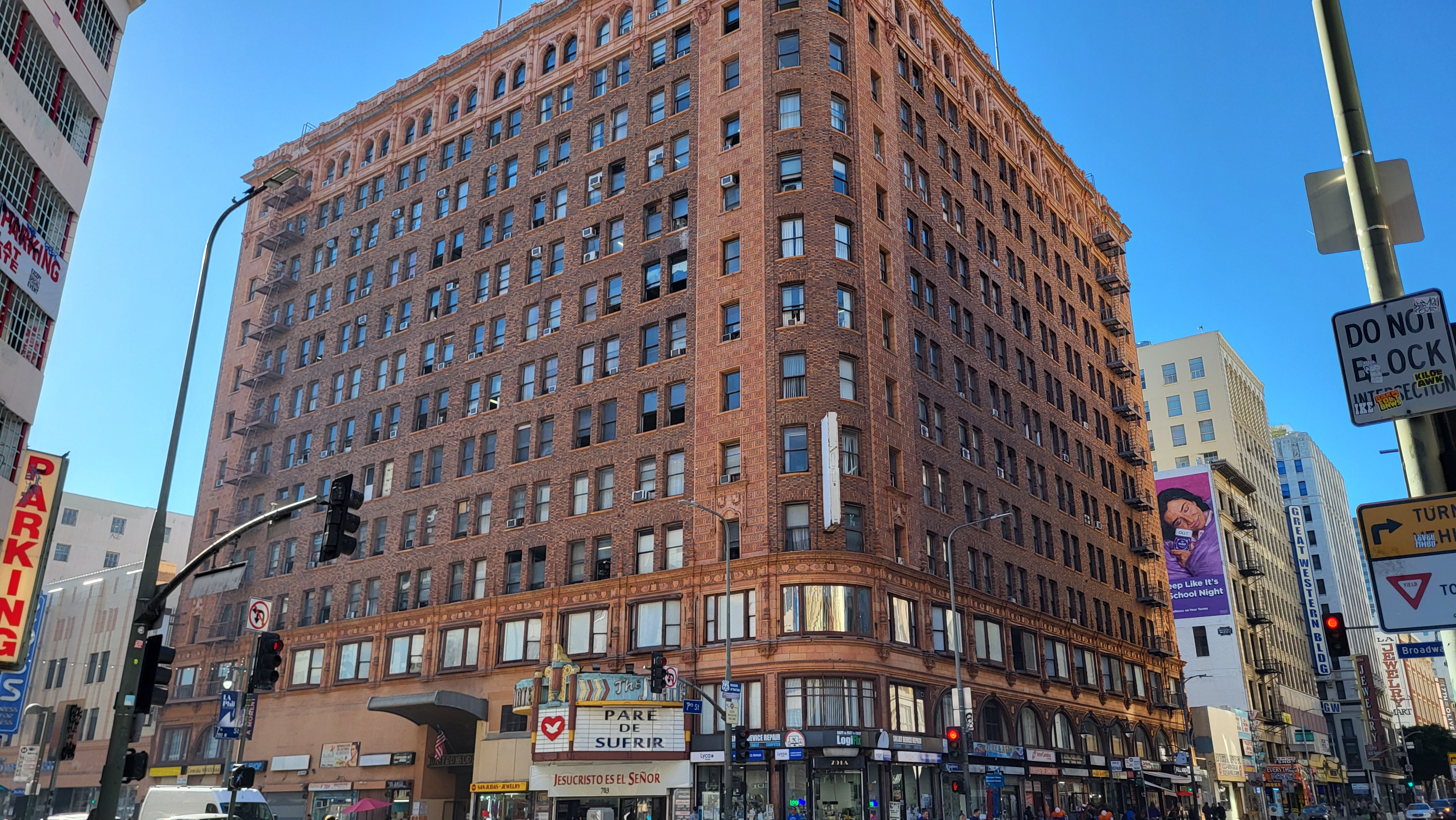
Loew's State Theatre

- Woolworth's Building, part of the Broadway Theater and Commercial District, Los Angeles (1920)
- Loew's State Theatre, part of the Broadway Theater and Commercial District, Los Angeles (1921)
- California State Office Building, Library and Courts Building, and the fountain court between them, part of the Capitol Extension District, Sacramento (1922-1928)
- Hotel Sainte Claire, San Jose (1926)
- Fox Oakland Theatre, Oakland (1928)

=== Other ===
==== In San Francisco ====
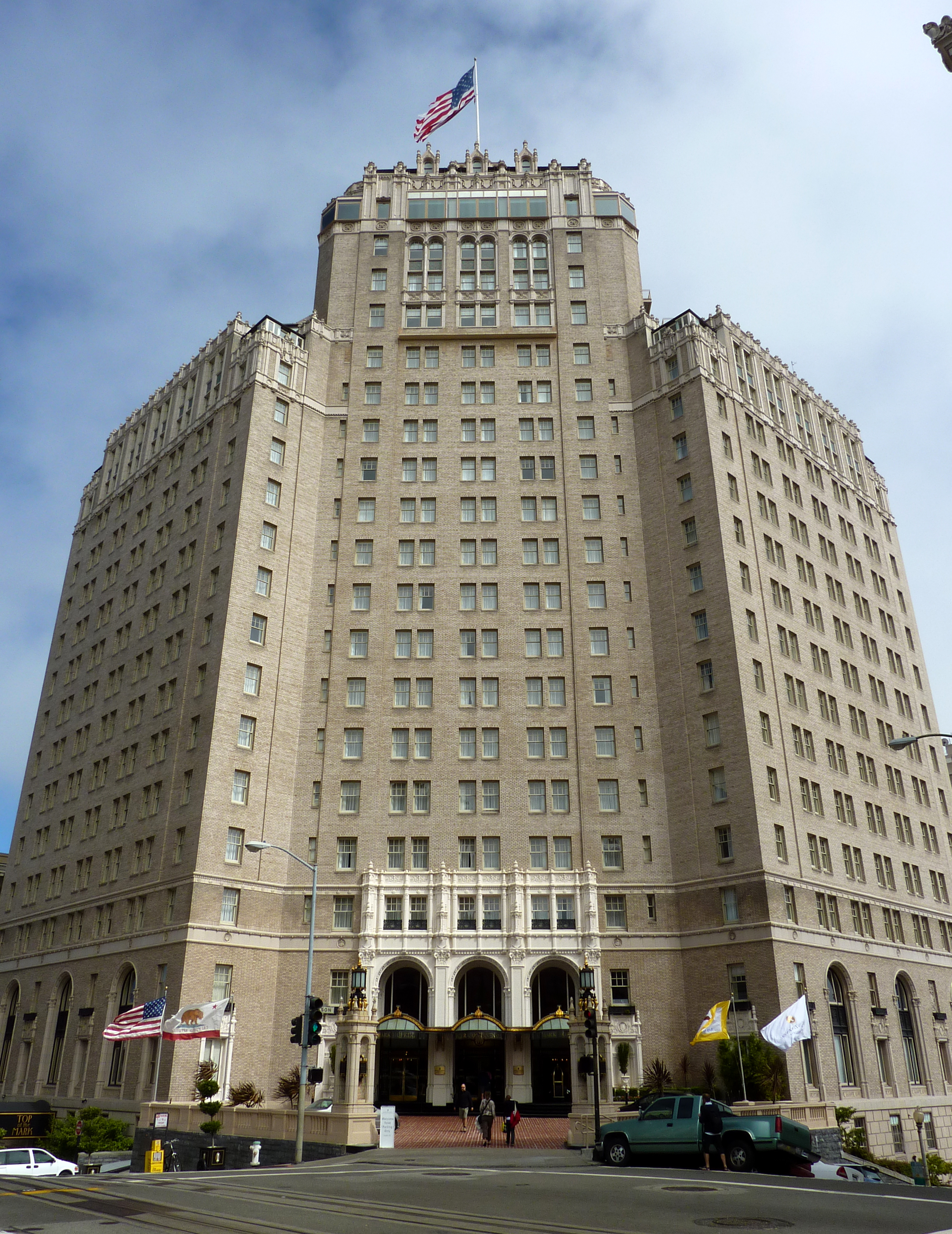
Mark Hopkins Hotel

- San Francisco Chronicle headquarters (1924)
- Mark Hopkins Hotel (1925), California Historical Landmark
- Brocklebank Apartments (1926)
- Schlage Lock "Old Office" and Plant 1 (1926)
- Sir Francis Drake Hotel (1928)
- Cathedral Apartments (1930)

==== Elsewhere ====
- Stanford Theatre, Palo Alto (1925)
- Peninsula Theatre, Burlingame (1926)
- California Theatre, San Jose (1927)
- Fox Theater, San Diego (1928)
- I. Magnin Building, Oakland (1931)
