= Woolworth's Building (Los Angeles) =

Building in Los Angeles, California

- Woolworth's
- U.S. Historic district – Contributing property
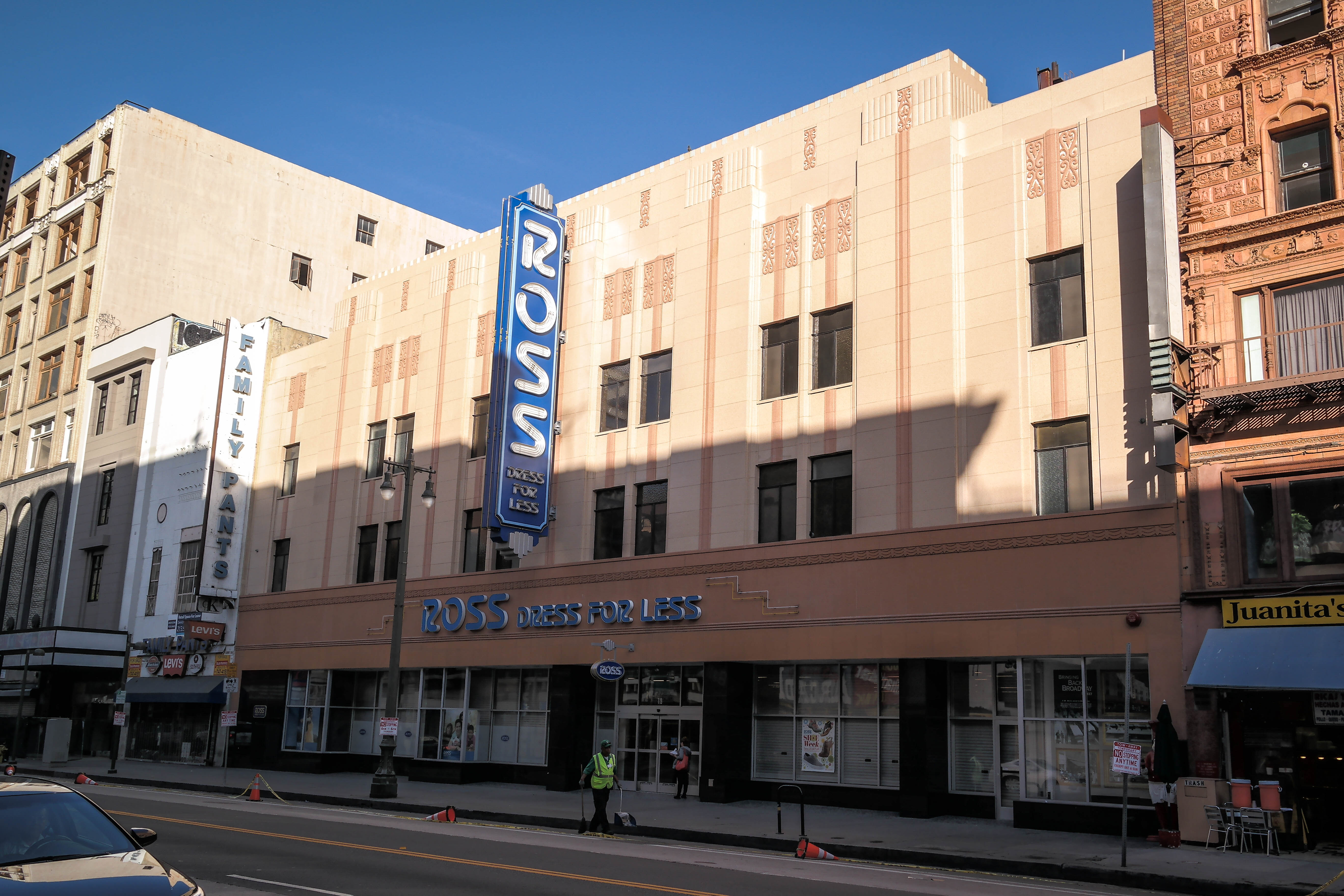
- The building in 2014

- Location within the Los Angeles metropolitan area
- Location: 719 S. Broadway, Los Angeles, California
- Coordinates: 34°02′42″N 118°15′15″W
- Built: 1920, 1941
- Architect: Weeks and Day (1920)
- Architectural style: Zigzag Moderne
- Part of: Broadway Theater and Commercial District (ID79000484)
- Designated CP: May 9, 1979

Woolworth's is a historic three-story building located at 719 S. Broadway in the Jewelry District and Broadway Theater District in the historic core of downtown Los Angeles.

== History ==
Downtown Los Angeles's Woolworth's building was designed by Weeks and Day and built in 1920. The cost of construction was approximately $100,000 ($1.61 million in 2025) and the building's original tenant was Woolworth's.

In 1941, Woolworth's and its adjoining building were combined into one, and the enlarged building's facade was altered into the Zigzag Moderne style.

In 1979, the Broadway Theater and Commercial District was added to the National Register of Historic Places, with Woolworth's listed as a contributing property in the district.

In 2011, the building was renovated as part of the Bringing Back Broadway campaign. In 2013, Ross Dress for Less opened in the building, and in 2014, the building was put up for auction with an opening bid of $4 million ($5.44 million in 2025).

== Architecture and design ==
Woolworth's Building is made of reinforced concrete in a steel frame and has a Zigzag Moderne facade. It is 60 feet (18 m) by 170 feet (52 m) feet in size. Inside, the building features two grand terrazzo-covered staircases that connect the ground floor to the basement.

== See also ==
- List of Woolworth buildings
- List of contributing properties in the Broadway Theater and Commercial District
