= Peninsula Theatre =

Former movie theater in Burlingame, California, United States

Peninsula Theatre (1926–1957) Fox Burlingame (1957–1974)
- Interactive map of Peninsula Theatre (1926–1957); Fox Burlingame (1957–1974)
- Address: 1415 Burlingame Avenue; Burlingame, California
- Coordinates: 37°34′39″N 122°21′02″W
- Owner: Peninsula Theatres Corporation Ellis John Arkush, President (1926–1929) Fox West Coast Theatres (1929–1974)
- Operator: Ellis J. Arkush Entertainment (1926–1957); Fox West Coast Theatres (1929–1974)
- Capacity: 2,000 seats (1926–1957); 1808 seats (1957–1974)
- Type: Movie Palace
- Screen: 1
- Current use: Shopping mall

Construction
- Opened: 12 October 1926
- Renovated: 1957
- Closed: 14 September 1974
- Demolished: 1 October 1975
- Years active: 47
- Architect: Weeks and Day

The Peninsula Theatre was a movie palace in Burlingame, California, that ran from 1926 to 1974. In 1957, the name was changed to Fox Burlingame. The theater was shuttered in 1974 and demolished in 1975 to make way for a shopping mall.

== History ==
The Peninsula Theatre was located at 1415 Burlingame Avenue, Burlingame, California. It opened October 12, 1926 – toward the end of the silent film era. It was the sixth of a chain of theaters operated by The Peninsula Theaters Corporation and was intended to replace the Garden Burlingame. The other five were all located on the San Francisco Peninsula.

Design and construction was commissioned by Peninsula Theatres Corporation doing business as Ellis J. Arkush Entertainment, a privately held California enterprise headed by Ellis J. Arkush, his brother, Frank Arkush, and an attorney, Eph Karelsen.

On December 28, 1925, prior to opening the Peninsula Theatre, Ellis J. Arkush sold a 50% interest, billed as a million dollar merger, in all his theaters, to West Coast Theatres, Inc., which, then, was the largest cinema theater company in the western North America. But Ellis, under the auspices of Peninsula Theatres Corporation, retained active management of the Peninsula Theatre. Policy and direction of the other theaters were assigned to Archie M. Bowles (né Archer Mckee Bowles; 1889–1944), General Manager of the Northern Branch of West Coast Theatres.

The opening on October 12, 1926, premiered the silent film, Upstage, and included an appearance by comedian Charley Chase. Also, the $50,000 Robert-Morton theater organ was played by Elbert La Chelle (né Elbert George Lachelle; 1905–1990), pronounced "la shell," and Elmer Vincent (né William Elmer Vincent; 1893–1952). Milt Franklyn and his nine-piece band was the founding house band.

The Peninsula Theatre hosted vaudeville on Saturday nights.

An audience of about 250 attended Fox Burlingame's final showing, a double-feature – Chinatown and The New Centurions — Saturday, September 14, 1974. Beverly Brehmer (née Beverly June Brehmer; born 1929) was the theater manager.

== Peninsula Theatres Corporation ==
Peninsula Theatres Corporation doing business as Ellis J. Arkush Entertainment, a privately held California enterprise headed by Ellis J. Arkush, his brother, Frank Arkush, and an attorney, Eph Karelsen.

	Theater	City	Street	Architect(s)	Notes
Managed by Arkush before the Peninsula opened
1)	Bell	Redwood City:	865 Main Street, near Stambaugh Street (Note: The address numbering on Main Street in Redwood City has changed over the years. The 1916 directory shows the Bell at 263-265 Main.)		Opened in 1910 – Arkush leased it September 15, 1914; his first theater venture; he remodeled it, adding a lobby and bringing in 150 chairs
1)	Garden	Burlingame:	Burlingame Avenue	Ernest L. Norberg (né Ernest Louis Norberg; 1889–1979)	Opened in 1918 by George Gates (né George Ward Gates; 1872–1962); Arkush leased it for 10 years beginning March 1, 1920; closed in 1925
2)	Regent	San Mateo:	Corner of Baldwin & San Mateo Drive	W.D. Shea (né William D. Shea; 1866–1931)	Opened May 4, 1915, by Hyman ("Herman") Levin (né Hyman Schloeme Levin; 1875–1974); originally 600 air-cushioned seats; initially contracted, for distribution, with Paramount Pictures Corporation; closed September 11, 1927, after Arkush purchased the San Mateo Theatre
3)	Sequoia	Redwood City:	2114 Broadway		Opened August 29, 1916, by Arkush, his second theatre – 750 seats – it was managed from 1922 to 1926 by William ("Bill") J. O'Brien (1875–1926); closed in 1929, when the "new" Sequoia opened
4)	Varsity	Palo Alto:	263 University Avenue at Ramona Street		Erected 1911, in a spot opposite the current Varsity Theatre. The original Varsity was initially owned by Frank LeSuer (né Frank Allen LeSeur; 1859–1924) and his brother-in-law, Ira G. Betts (1856–1929). Around 1922, Betts sold his interest in the Varsity to LeSuer and a partnership was formed with Arkush, and the two theaters – the Varsity and the Stanford – were incorporated as the Palo Alto Theater Company – Arkush as President and LeSeur as Vice President – with a capitalization of $50,000, with the aim of developing a chain of Peninsula motion-picture houses, starting with the relocation (then owned by Charles H. Strub, a dentist). From about 1928 to about 1931, Sherman, Clay & Co. sold radios, phonographs, records, and pianos from the location
5)	Stanford	Palo Alto:		Weeks and Day	Opened June 7, 1925, by Ellis Arkush
Managed by Arkush after the Peninsula opened
6)	San Mateo	San Mateo:	66 East 3rd Avenue	Irving F. Morrow & William I. Garren	Opened July 23, 1925, by Max Blumenfeld (1877–1936) under the auspices of the Blumenfeld Theatre Circuit – 1,600 seats; acquired September 3, 1927, by Arkush
7)	Sequoia	Redwood City:	2215 Broadway	Reid & Reid	Opened January 2, 1929, by Arkush

== Original theater (1926) ==
=== 1927 ===
The Peninsula Theatre was originally designed for both (i) vaudeville stage shows and (i) silent movies. Construction and development outlay was US$500,000 (equivalent to $9,093,045 in 2025, inflation adjusted estimate) Weeks & Day were the architects. The original Peninsula Theatre had 2,000 seats and was ornately Spanish baroque in style, featuring staircases in the lobby ascending between pillars inset with mosaic-like panels depicting animals.

==== Theater organ ====
Make

- Robert Morton Organ Company of San Francisco and New York
- Opus (number not known; likely range: 2293–2412)

Only the third of its type and size to be installed in a Pacific Coast theater.

Pipes

- A thousand thirty-three pipes capable of producing orchestral instrument sounds that included the tuba, English horn, concert flute, viola, violin, kinura, oboe, clarinet, and bass violin. For accompaniment music, the organ had diapason tibia plena, voix céleste, and vox humana – for the human voice. It also had a harp marimba, chrysoglott harp, orchestral bells, glockenspiel, chimes, xylophone, bass drum, tympani, cymbal, crash cymbal, snare drum, tom tom, castanets, tambourine, triangle, and sleigh bells.

Console

- Solid mahogany 3-manual and pedal console
- 13 ranks
- 153 stops in the stoprail
- Manual compass (chromatic range) is 61 keys
- Pedal compass had 32 notes
- Possibly a "Carlsted" console, named for Morton's head draftsman, Paul Simon Carlsted (1891–1982)

Mechanical

- Electro-pneumatic action (chests) with individual expression shutters controlled various shadings
- More than 1,500 electromagnets operated the valve mechanism

Power

- Centrifugal blower driven by a 10-horsepower motor, voiced on 15-inch wind pressure (a size capable of delivering air at 1900 C.F.M. – cubic feet per minute) ("Orgoblo" centrifugal blower manufactured by The Spencer Turbine Co. of Hartford)
- A 70-ampere, 10-volt generator, driven by a 2-horsepower provided the voltage for the magnets that operate the valve mechanism
- A special 24-inch vacuum blower, powered by a 1-horsepower motor, supplied the exhaust air for the piano mechanism
- All motors were controlled by switches from the console

Piano

- A piano, placed in a separate compartment in the orchestra pit, was also controlled from the console

Installation engineer

- Leo F. Schoenstein (né Leo Ferdinand Schoenstein; 1878–1951), under the auspices of Schoenstein & Co. of San Francisco – technician for the Morgan Organ Company – personally directed the installation.

Current status

- Dismantled and dispersed (circa 2007); was in possession of Dale Merrill Haskin (1942–2007), a collector of theater organs, late of Portland, Oregon, who also owned the San Francisco Orpheum organ. Much of Haskin's collection is now with the Columbia River Theatre Organ Society of Portland.

Housing for the organ pipes

- The auditorium featured a massive plasterwork proscenium, and was flanked on both sides with arched organ fronts for the expression chambers.

== Theater renovation (1957) ==
In 1957, Fox West Coast Theatres, (Note: Fox West Coast Theatres was the outgrowth of a 1929 acquisition by Fox Film Corporation of West Coast Theatres, Inc., and its affiliate, Wesco, for a sum exceeding $100,000,000. West Coast Theatres, at the time, controlled more than 350 theaters. ("Fox Co. Buys Theatre Chain," Petaluma Daily Morning Courier, January 26, 1928, p. 7; accessible via Newspapers.com at www.newspapers.com/clip/50694079/petaluma-daily-morning-courier/) Fox West Coast Theatres went into bankruptcy and was sold for $17,000,000 to The National Theatres Corporation, led by the Skouras brothers, Charles Skouras, President. Charles' brother, George Skouras, went on to become President of United Artists Theaters. A third brother, Spyros Skouras, was President of 20th Century Fox from 1942 to 1962.) then the owners, spent $100,000 renovating the theater, this time 1808 seats and was reopened with an extravagant ceremony on the evening of August 16, 1957, and henceforth was named the Fox Burlingame. For many years, the theatre's roof featured a two-sided lightbulb sign, with incandescent fireworks, similar to that which still survives atop the Grand Lake Theatre in Oakland. The Fox Burlingame Theater closed September 14, 1974, and was demolished the following year to make way for the Fox Mall, a shopping center developed by two investors – Mario Castro and Joseph Karp. The Fox Mall was built and dedicated in 1979.

== Ownership ==
Ellis John Arkush, a native of New York and 1910 graduate of Columbia University (civil engineering), entered the theater business in Redwood City in 1914 where he built the Sequoia Theater. He added the Variety and Stanford Theatres in Palo Alto, the Peninsula Theatre, and the San Mateo Theatre in San Mateo. Ellis Arkush was the president of Peninsula Theatres Corporation. The entire chain was sold in 1929 to Fox West Coast Theatres.

== Selected personnel ==
=== Management ===
Peninsula Theatres Corporation dba Ellis J. Arkush Entertainment

- Ellis John Arkush (1888–1974), President of Peninsula Theatres Corporation, also brother of Frank
- Frank Ephriam Arkush (1884–1947), brother of Ellis
- Eph Karelsen (né Ephraim Adolphus Karelsen; 1871–1956), attorney and Arkush's maternal cousin
- Ray Kelsall (né Ray Roland Kelsall; 1889–1953), founding business manager who, before had been manager of the Garden Theatre. He had a staff of 22 – including

- W.H. Augustus, Jr., house manager
- Hale Warn (né Hale Knowlton Warn; 1910–1979), head usher
- Walter Hawthorne Farley (1890–1960), chief operator (projectionist)
- Andrew Hillgard, assistant operator
- F. H. Thomason (né Floyd Harris Thomason; 1896–1976), stage manager, and later, projectionist
- Dorothy Durant (née Josephine E. Durant; 1904–1953), cashier
- Agnes Durant (née Agnes Magdalen Durant; 1909–1992), assistant cashier (Dorothy's younger sister)

Fox West Coast Theatres (beginning 1957)

- "Billie" Tannehill (né William Jackson Tannehill; 1925–2001), theater manager in Burlingame from about 1955 to 1967. He later managed the Century 21 Theatre in San Jose, which opened in 1963 and closed in 2014. He was survived by his wife, Marlene Grace Murphy (maiden; 1936–2011), and three children. Tannehill started managing theaters in the late 1940s, after serving in the Navy during World War II. He managed theaters for Fox West Coast, Mann Theatres, and finished his career with Century Theatres, spending the last 17 years at Century 21.
- Ward Stoopes (né Ward Farmiloe Stoopes; 1926–1999), a theater manager in the San Francisco area who began his career at Fox Burlingame
- Beverly Brehmer (née Beverly June Brehmer; born 1929), manager at the Fox Burlingame when it closed September 14, 1974, had worked for Fox West Coast Theatres since the late 1950s

=== Entertainers ===
- Milt Franklyn (né Milton J. Franklyn; 1897–1962)

== Photo links ==
Photos from the Los Angeles Public Library, all dated 1945:

- 1 Marquee LAPL00071370 (Los Angeles Public Library call number)
- 2 Lobby stairs LAPL00071371
- 3 Lobby LAPL00071372
- 4 Lobby LAPL00071373
- 5 Proscenium LAPL00071374
- 6 Marquee, front LAPL00071375
- 7 Marquee, front LAPL00071376
- 8 The Peninsula in 1930, San Francisco Chronicle file photo

== Projection equipment ==
In the beginning of 1929, the Peninsula was operating two 35 mm Fulco projectors, Ernemann design, manufactured by E.E. Fulton Company of Chicago – Carl Henry Fulton (1896–1947), President and son of the firms namesake, Elmer E. Fulton (1861–1921).

== See also ==
- Fox Theatres

== Miscellaneous ==
The Golden State Theatre houses a number of items saved from other theaters, which happened to match items which were missing, including one stained glass exit sign from the Peninsula Theatre.
