= Hall of Transportation, Treasure Island =

- U.S. National Register of Historic Places
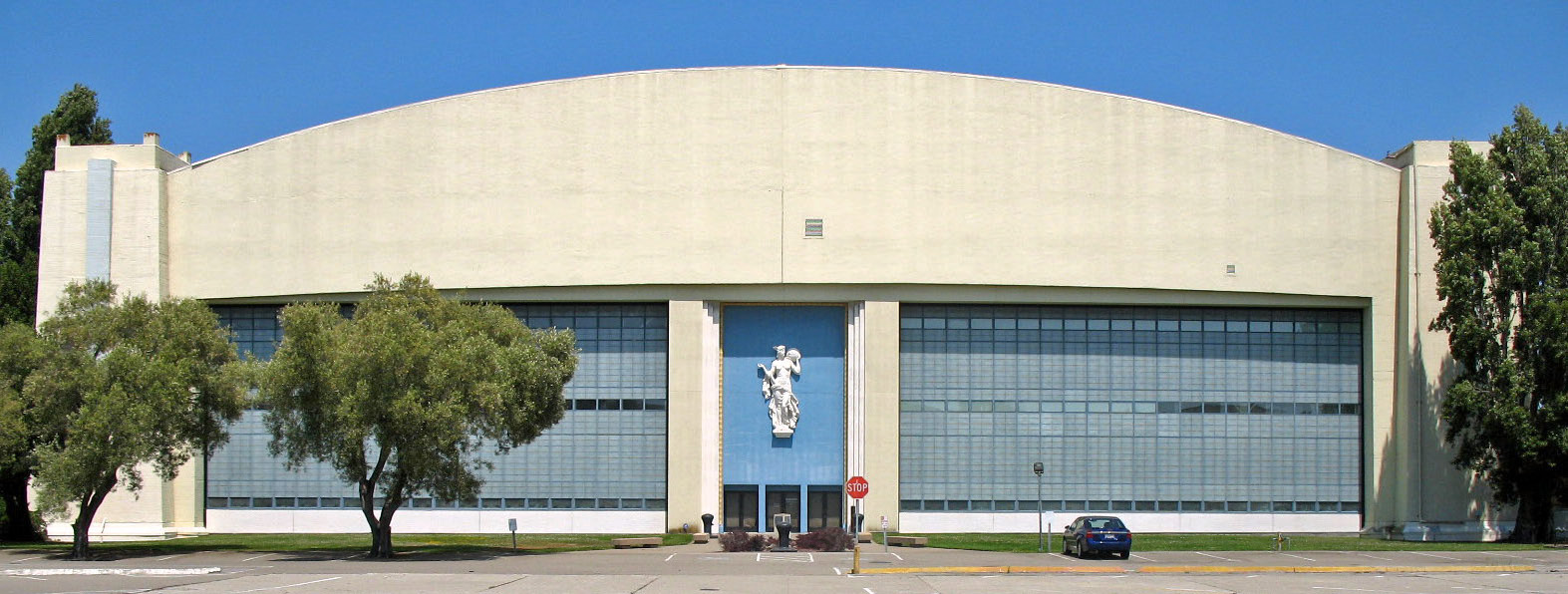
- Hall of Transportation

- Location within San Francisco County Location within California Location within the United States
- Location: SE Side of California Ave. between Aves. D & F, Treasure Island, California
- Coordinates: 37°49′5″N 122°22′2″W
- Area: 2 acres (0.81 ha)
- Built: 1938
- Architects: Day, William Peyton; Kelham, George William
- Architectural style: Moderne
- NRHP reference No.: 08000082
- Added to NRHP: February 26, 2008

The Hall of Transportation, Treasure Island, on Treasure Island, California, also known as Building 2, was built in 1938 for the 1939-40 Golden Gate International Exposition. It served as the hall of transportation for the exposition. It was constructed with the idea that it would serve as an airplane hangar after the Exposition but it never did. It was designed in Moderne style by architects William Peyton Day and George William Kelham. It was listed on the National Register of Historic Places in 2008.
