= The Westin San Jose =

- Hotel Sainte Claire
- U.S. National Register of Historic Places
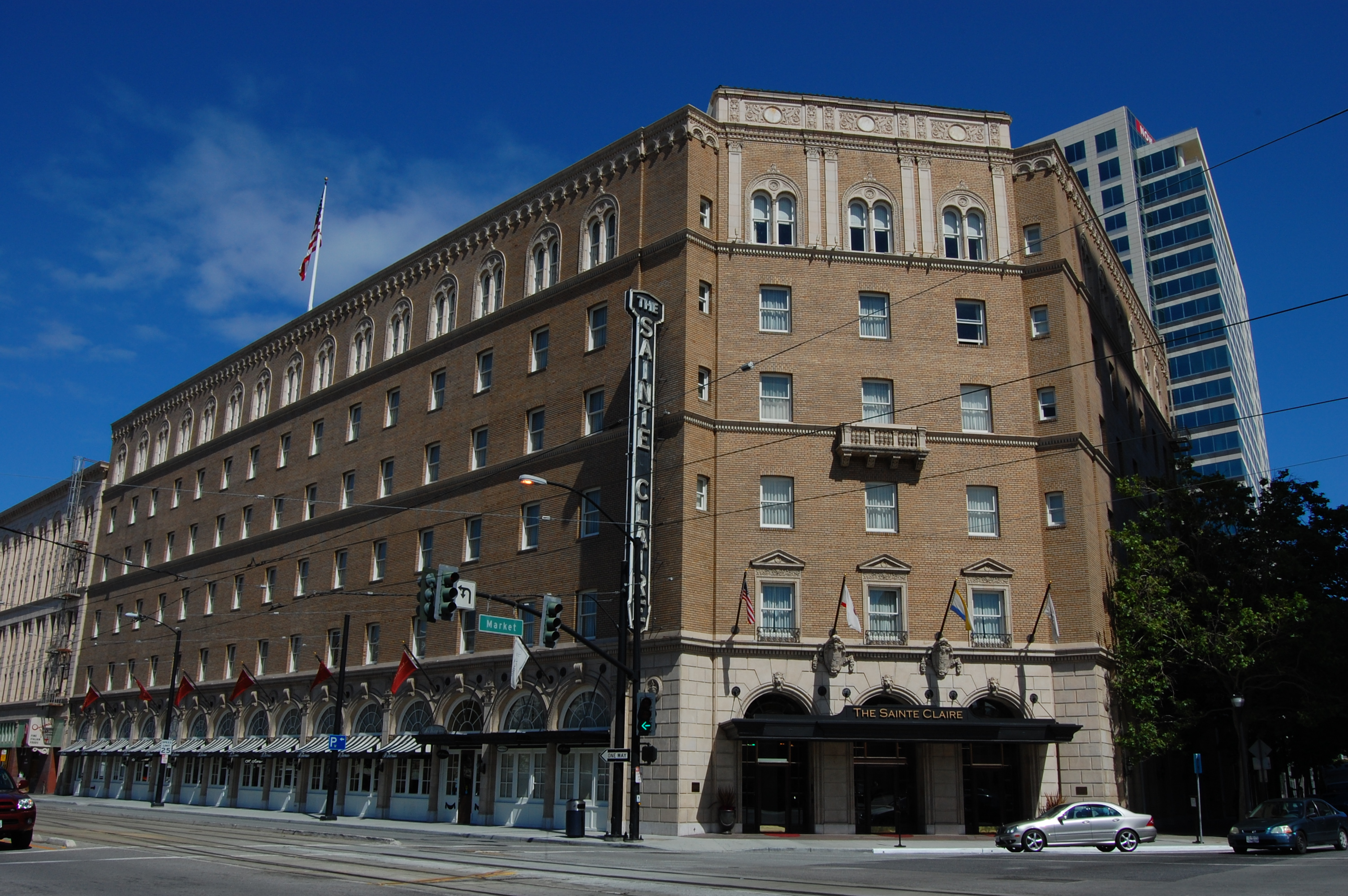

- Location within San Jose, California Location within California Location within the United States
- Location: San Jose, California
- Coordinates: 37°19′51.4″N 121°53′15.67″W
- Built: 1926; 100 years ago
- Architect: Weeks and Day
- Architectural style: Italian Renaissance Revival - Mediterranean Revival
- NRHP reference No.: 80000865
- Added to NRHP: June 3, 1980

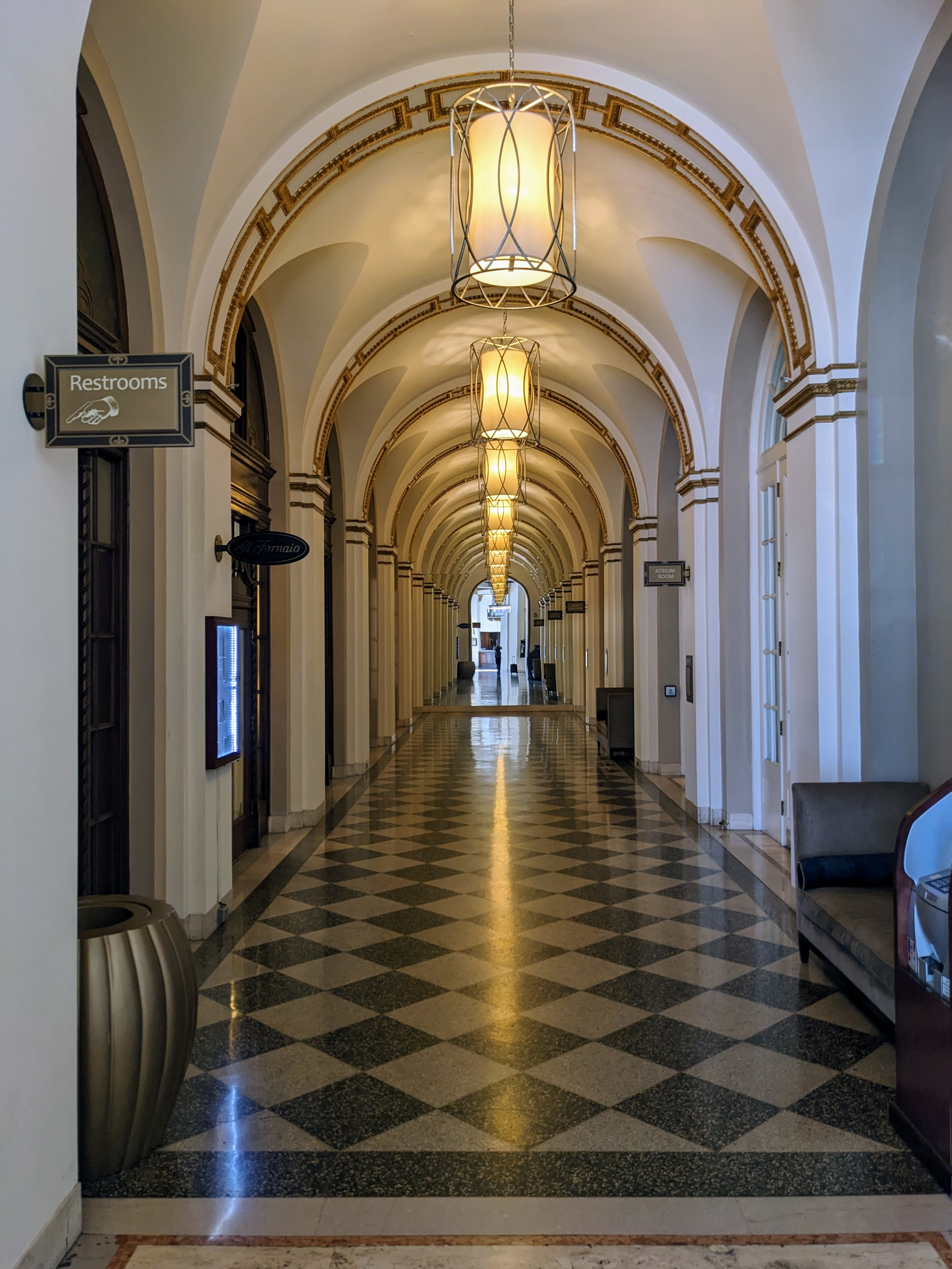
Interior corridor of The Westin San Jose

The Westin San Jose, housed in the historic Sainte Claire Hotel, is a six-story landmark hotel in Downtown San Jose, California, United States. Built in 1926, it is listed on the National Register of Historic Places and one of the city's most recognized architectural landmarks.

== Design ==
The Sainte Claire was designed by the prominent San Francisco architectural firm of Weeks and Day, well noted for both their theater and hotel designs in California. Interior similarities exist between San Jose's Sainte Claire and the Mark Hopkins Hotel in San Francisco. Renaissance Revival detailing is basically derived from the Italian Renaissance tradition, though there are several references to French, Spanish, and Mediterranean Revival architecture.

Especially notable are the coffered lobby ceilings designed by the firm for both buildings. The northwest corner is truncated and recessed, forming the corner entrance which faces the intersection of South Market and San Carlos Streets. North and west elevations meet the truncated corner at a 120-degree angle, thus framing the entrance. Tawny brick sheathes the steel-and-concrete frame on floors two through six, and rusticated buff-colored stone faces the ground level. The three-part vertical composition includes the arcaded ground level, a shaft of four stories, and the six floors distinguished by paired windows set in arched frames. Denticular stringcourses separate the first and second floors, the third and fourth floors and the fifth and sixth floors.

The hotel lobby remains the most intact interior space within the building. The Patio Room, once the hallmark of the hotel, has been covered over, modernized and combined with the Empire Room. Originally, the open patio room was framed by a Corinthian arcade. A small formal garden and fountain room, the Spartan Room on the second floor has also been modernized. Ceilings in the lobby, Spartan and Empire rooms were hand-painted, but alterations over the years have obliterated the original work. Wood details in the guest rooms and the ornate hand-carved wood doors leading to the retail areas are intact. Many of the rooms have original bathroom fixtures.

== History ==
The Hotel Sainte Claire enjoyed the status of being the premiere grand hotel in the South Peninsula region, and the reputation of having the most elegant accommodations between San Francisco and Los Angeles.

The hotel was financed by noted realtor and developer T. S. Montgomery, a prominent citizen of San Jose largely responsible for much of the commercial development in the downtown. In addition to financing such an ambitious project, Montgomery donated to the city a parcel of land across from the hotel for the new civic auditorium, which stands today.

After its restoration in the 1990s, it was known as the Hyatt Sainte Claire. In the 2000s, it was renamed the Hotel Sainte Claire. It was renovated and rebranded The Westin San Jose on July 9, 2015.
