= St. Peter's Chapel, Mare Island =

- U.S. National Historic Landmark District – Contributing property
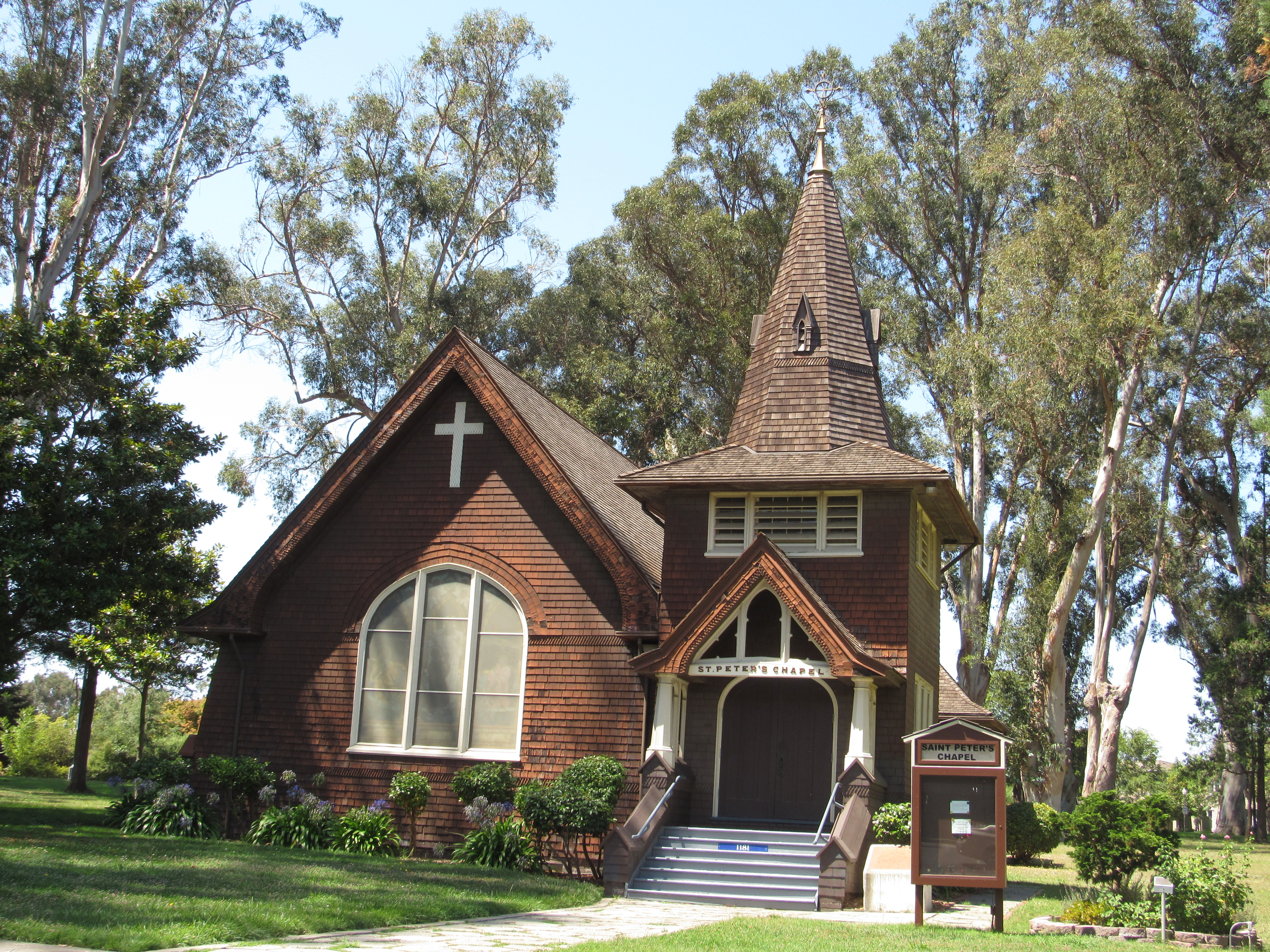
- St Peter's Chapel in Chapel Park at Mare Island, Vallejo, California
- Location: 1181 Walnut Avenue, Vallejo, California 94592
- Coordinates: 38°5′40″N 122°16′13″W
- Area: Chapel Park, Mare Island Naval Shipyard
- Built: 1901-1904, dedicated 13 October 1901
- Architect: Albert Sutton
- Architectural style: Shingled Gothic church
- Part of: Mare Island Naval Shipyard (ID75002103)

St. Peter's Chapel, Mare Island (locally, St. Peter's Chapel) is an historic church building located on Walnut near Cedar Avenues, Vallejo, Solano County, California, in the historic core of the Mare Island Naval Shipyard. It is the first Naval chapel in the Pacific, the first interdenominational chapel in the armed services, and the second chapel built on a U.S. Navy property, the first being the original Naval chapel in Annapolis replaced in 1904.

Dedicated on 13 October 1901, St. Peter's Chapel is the oldest extant Naval chapel in the United States and has one of the largest collections of Tiffany windows in situ under one roof. It is "a key contributing element of the Mare Island Historic District, listed in the National Register of Historic Places and a National Historic Landmark, and individually, as one of the most important chapels owned by the U.S. Navy."

== History ==
The person most responsible for the presence of St. Peter's Chapel at Mare Island was Rev. Adam A. McAlister (1841-1916), chaplain in the U.S. Navy from 1873 to 1909, serving almost all of those years at Mare Island. During the decades he served before the chapel was built, he would hold services at whatever space could be "rigged for church" with minimal disruption to ordinary functions. Not satisfied with this makeshift arrangement, McAlister was able to convince his friend U.S. Senator George C. Perkins to include a $5000 appropriation in the 1900 Naval Appropriations Act for the construction of a chapel at Mare Island.

McAlister quickly hired San Francisco architect, Albert Sutton, to draw up plans for a chapel at Mare Island, paid him $50 from church donations for his services, and forwarded Sutton's plans to the Navy Department in Washington, D.C. on 30 November 1900, only months after the congressional appropriation. The chapel was largely completed in 1901, had its first service on 6 October 1901, was dedicated on 13 October 1901 by various Protestant clergies, followed a month later by its first Catholic mass. Interdenominational from its beginning, St. Peter's Chapel was named after Simon, called Peter, a toiler of the sea whose story is told in the Gospels.

Over the next decades, art glass windows and many of the interior furnishings were added and paid for by parishioners and private contributions. The stained glass windows were typically donated by family members in memory of U.S. Navy personnel; commemorative ceiling and wall tablets were likewise dedicated to various individuals and groups. Through the efforts of Chaplain McAlister and his friends, St. Peter's became an important U.S. Navy memorial chapel. Almost all of the art glass windows were in place by McAlister's funeral at St. Peter's Chapel in 1916.

"That the chaplain and his friends have been successful is attested by the many who come almost daily and sit for an hour in the chapel studying the works of art and receiving the spiritual uplift..."

The chapel served the Mare Island community — Naval and Marine officers, enlisted men and women, as well as the civilian workforce — much like a local community church, given how isolated and self-contained Mare Island was then. It was a focus of life on the base, with the art glass windows and commemorative tablets contributed by the community reflecting the sense of community and continuity that existed at the base through its numerous decades of service. For many generations, it was the site for various key transitional events, like weddings, baptisms, and funerals. World War II brought the greatest number of weddings to the chapel, as young sailors got married just before being sent off to the Pacific Theater. As historian McDonald noted, "The chapel, more than any other building, bears witness to the closeness of the community that developed at the Mare Island Naval Shipyard."

Over 300 persons crowded into the chapel on Christmas Eve of 1995 for the last scheduled service before the closure of the base on 31 March 1996. The fourth and last advent candle was lit by Captain Cavender, the last Shipyard Commander, and his wife. As it was for numerous decades, the last scheduled service at St. Peter's Chapel ended with the singing of the Navy hymn, Eternal Father, Strong to Save.

== Chapel building ==
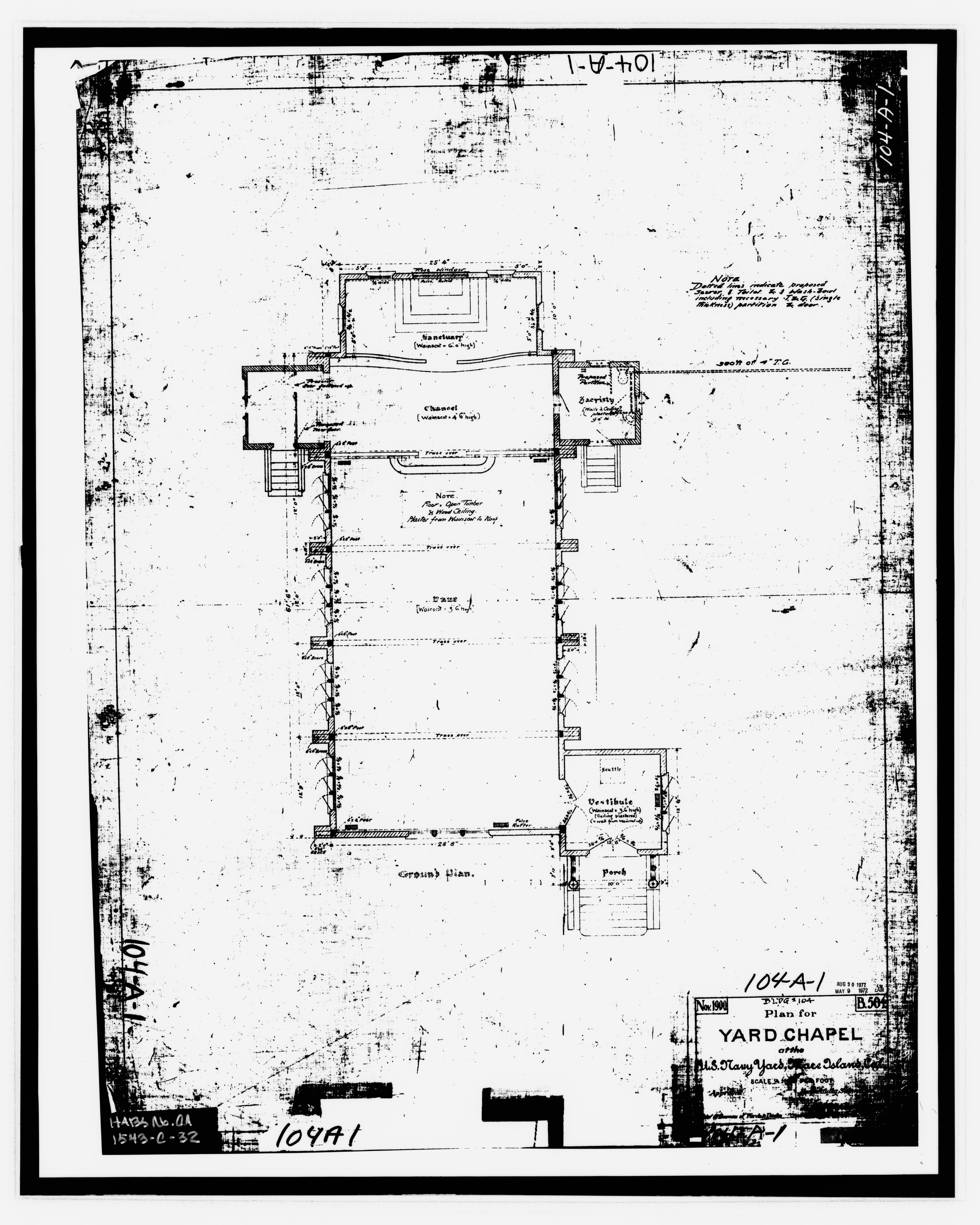
Albert Sutton's 1900 floorplan for a chapel at Mare Island

Architect Sutton's original plan of 1900 called for a wood-framed, one-story, Shingled Gothic-style, cruciform church building, with a steep front gabled roof over a rectangular nave, a cross-gabled chancel, and a rectangular sanctuary (see floorplan). The original building is on a brick foundation and oriented nominally east-west, with the sanctuary and altar located at the west end. The chancel, with its choir stalls to the left and sacristy to the right, form the arms of the cross. The nave and its pews face west toward the altar and sanctuary. The main entrance is through a vestibule, offset to the right of the nave, entering through the north wall into the back of the nave. The chapel was largely completed by October 1901, when it was dedicated, although Sutton's plan was not completed until 1904. The historic building remains mostly unmodified, with three minor additions: a 1929 rear addition for the organ and two 1963 side additions. Although the additions were well-integrated, except for the tell-tale concrete foundation, they have somewhat obscured the original shape of the cruciform.

=== Art glass windows ===
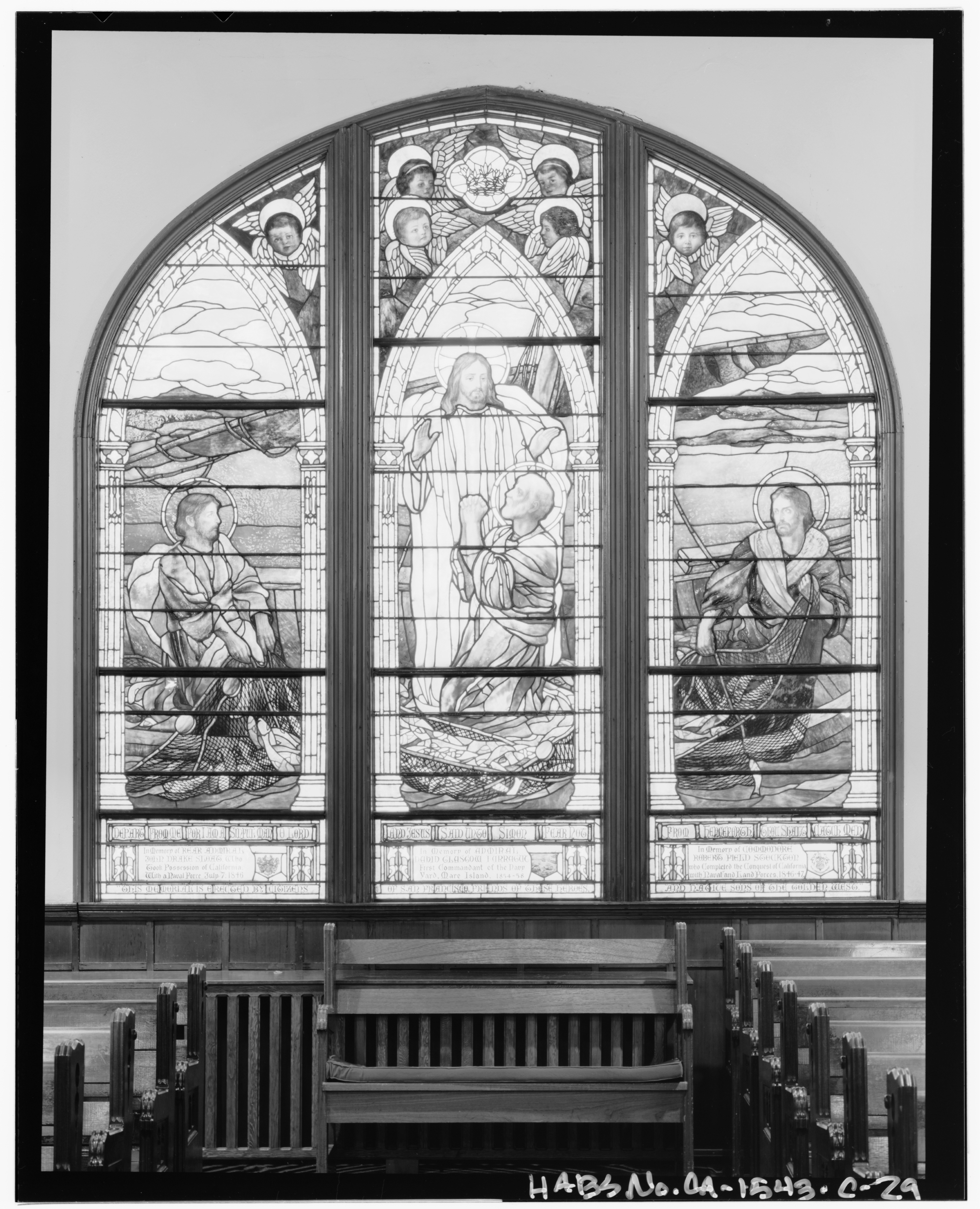
Triptych window near the vestibule entrance to the chapel depicts Simon Peter being called by Christ, dedicated 1907 to Admirals Sloat and Farragut and Commodore Stockton.

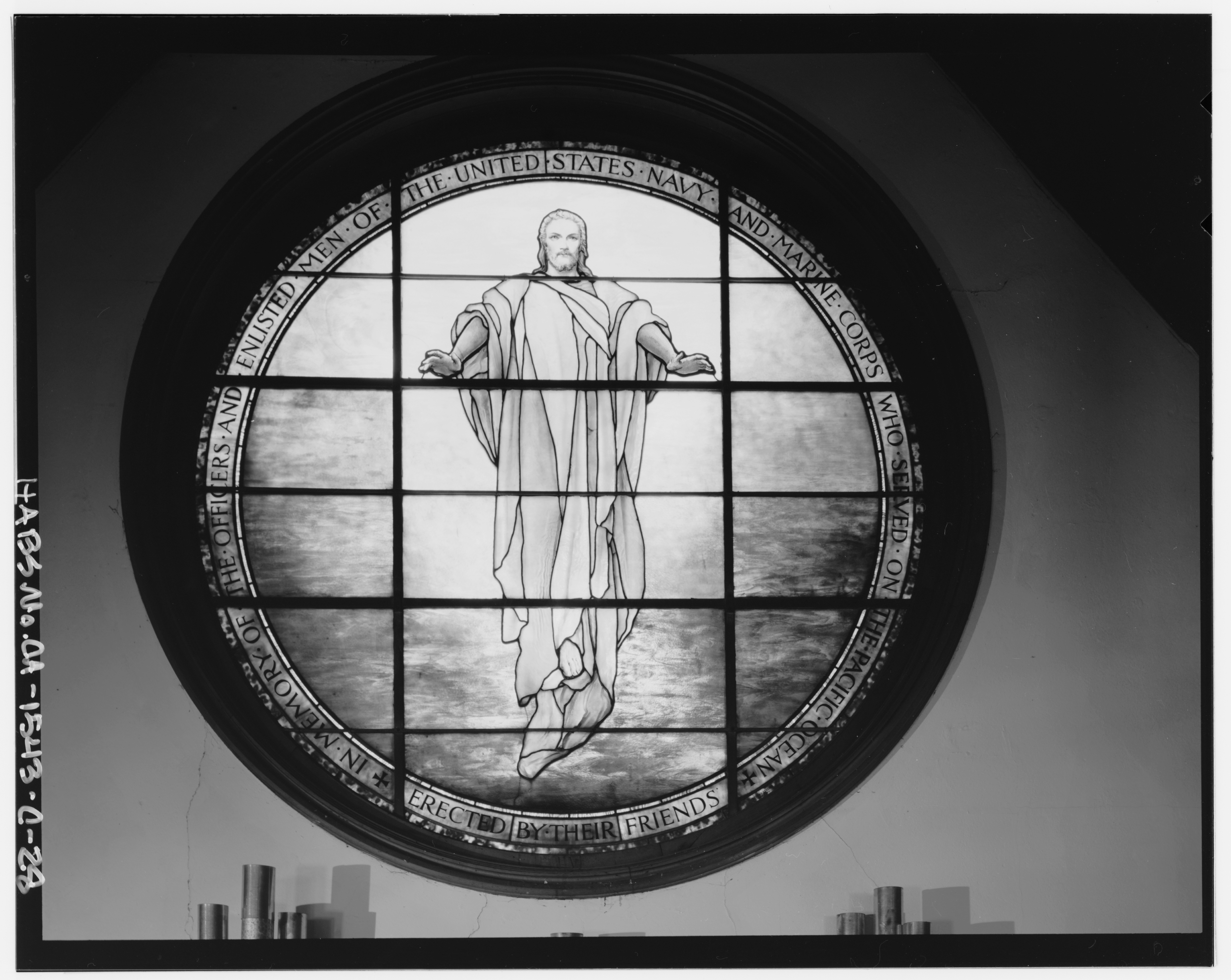
Tiffany rose window above altar The ascendant Christ: dedicated 1913 to those in the U.S. Navy and Marine Corps who served on the Pacific Ocean.

St. Peter’s Chapel is noted for its art glass windows, 27 such windows in total: A large triptych window at the back east end of the nave, 21 same-sized windows along the two sides of the nave, and five windows in the sanctuary at the front west end of the chapel. They are best viewed from the inside in the daytime, although the two side windows in the sanctuary are artificially backlit due to the 1963 side additions. Donated during the period from 1905 to 1930, typically in memory of U.S. Navy personnel, these windows beautify the chapel as well as symbolize the community spirit with which it was built and maintained through the decades.

The large triptych stained glass window at the back of the nave near the main vestibule entrance, made by Ingerson & Glaser and unveiled in 1907, shows Simon, called Peter, a toiler of the sea for whom the chapel is named. The triptych is dedicated to the three naval pioneers most responsible for establishing a presence for the U.S. Navy in securing California in the mid-1800s: Admiral David Farragut, Rear Admiral John D. Sloat, and Commodore Robert F. Stockton.

"The Sower", Du Pont Memorial Window (1908): one of 25 Tiffany windows in situ at St. Peter's Chapel

Of the 27 art glass windows that grace St. Peter's Chapel, 25 are from Tiffany Studios in New York (16 of them signed) and most designed by Frederick Wilson. Thus, St. Peter's Chapel has one of the largest collection of Tiffany windows in situ under one roof.

Two Tiffany windows deserve special note. The large window on the right side of the sanctuary is a pastoral view of the Good Shepherd and is dedicated to Chaplain Adam McAlister, with the inscription: "To whose devotion to this Chapel the placing of many of its Memorials is due." The 9-ft-round Rose window high above the altar in the sanctuary is the ascendant Christ and is dedicated to those "in the U.S. Navy and Marine Corps who served on the Pacific Ocean".

The final memorial window installed, made by Cummings Studio, features a Madonna and Child, inspired by “The Madonna with the Olive Branch” painting by Barabino. lt was dedicated, according to the Shipyard Commandant, Captain Thomas A. Kearney, on 2 July 1930, "as an outward expression of affectionate appreciation and esteem," with the inscription, “To the Women of the Navy and the Marine Corps.”

== See also ==
- Faith Chapel (Jekyll Island, Georgia)—a Shingled church building similar to St. Peter's Chapel, also designed by Albert Sutton
