= State Theatre (Los Angeles) =

Historic movie theatre in Downtown Los Angeles

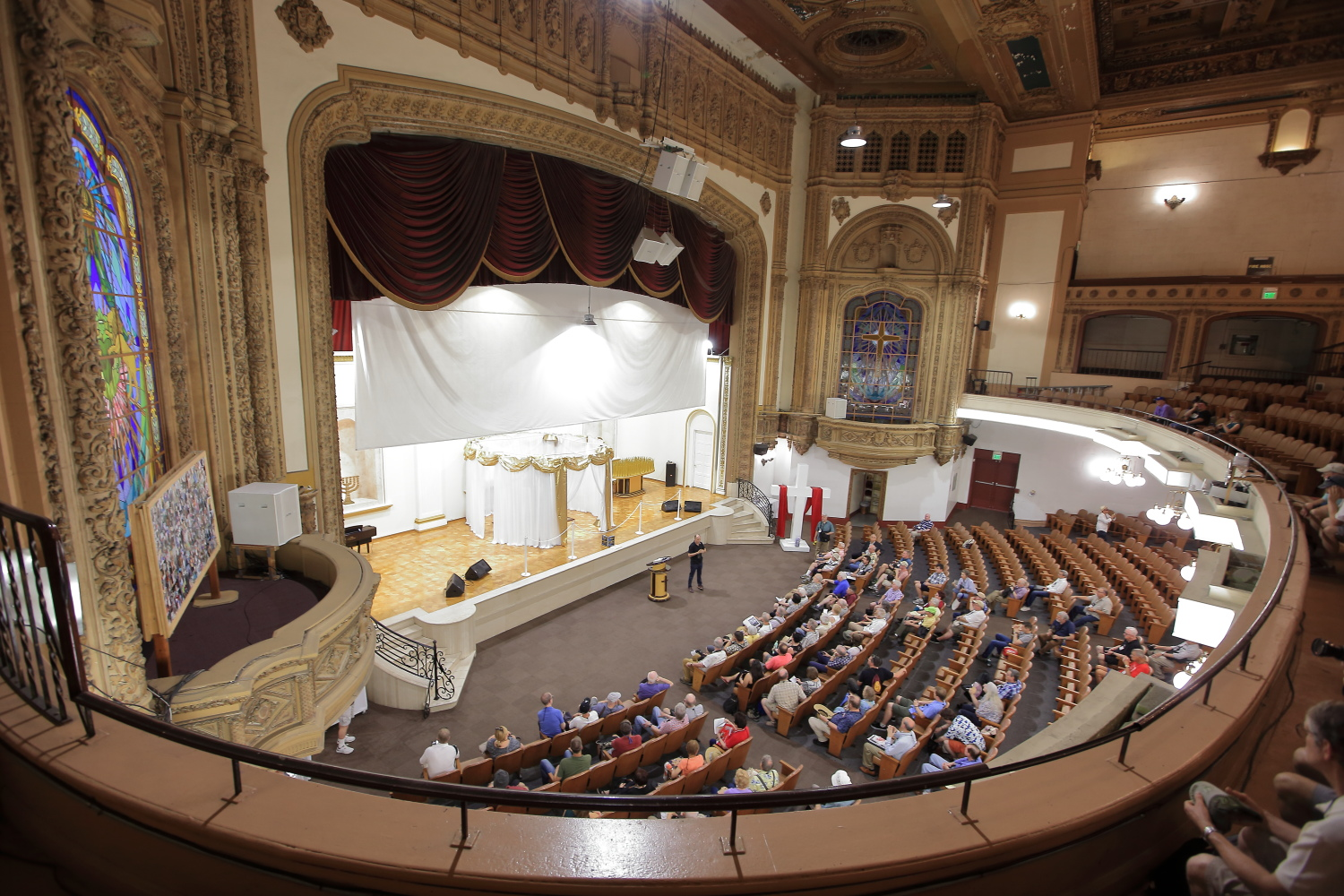
- Interior of the State Theatre, 2017
- Interactive map of State Theatre
- Former names: Loew's State Theatre
- Address: 703 S. Broadway
- Location: Los Angeles, California
- Coordinates: 34.0451189°N 118.2536541°W
- Owner: Broadway Theater Group
- Capacity: 2,450
- Type: Movie theatre

Construction
- Opened: November 12, 1921
- Architect: Weeks & Day

Tenant
- Universal Church of the Kingdom of God

Website
- statetheatre.la

Los Angeles Historic-Cultural Monument
- Designated: March 20, 1991
- Reference no.: 522

U.S. National Register of Historic Places
- Designated: May 9, 1979
- Part of: Broadway Theater and Commercial District
- Reference no.: 78000687

The State Theatre, formerly Loew's State Theatre, at 703 S. Broadway, is a movie theatre that opened in November 1921 in what is now the Jewelry District and Broadway Theatre District in the historic core of Downtown Los Angeles.

== History ==
The State Theatre was designed by Charles Peter Weeks and William Day, of architectural firm Weeks & Day, in a Spanish Renaissance style.

The theatre is incorporated into a 12-story Beaux Arts style 1921 office block called the United Building, situated at the intersection of S. Broadway and 7th St. The building, which extends half a block along 7th St and one-third of a block along Broadway, was the largest brick-clad building in the world when it was completed and remains one of the largest brick-clad buildings in Los Angeles today. The theatre originally boasted two marquees with entrances on both Broadway and 7th. The 7th St entrance was closed in 1936.

The theatre's location at the intersection of Downtown Los Angeles’ two busiest retail streets of the early 1920s ensured that the theatre was a consistent money maker. At the time of the State Theatre’s opening the theatre’s projection booth was proclaimed to be the largest in the world and boasted the unique feature of a shower bath, with hot and cold water, for the projectionist. The theatre was originally equipped with a Moller organ which was replaced with a Wurlitzer organ in 1925.

The Gumm Sisters played vaudeville at the theatre in 1929, featuring a lead singer who earned the nickname “Leather Lungs” because of her ability to be heard clearly at the rear of the 125 ft deep auditorium. Vaudeville ended at the State in 1935 and the Gumm Sisters moved to Culver City to appear in experimental Technicolor musicals where “Leather Lungs” changed her name to Judy Garland.

In 1931, the theater ran the first full-length movie of a football game ever exhibited in an American theater as a top feature. The 1931 USC football victory over Notre Dame was the first one half of a double feature. The first day business was so good, it was clear people were coming to see the game, so the manager pulled the second feature and ran the gridiron picture over and over. At the time, it broke all house records at Loew's State Theater.

In 1949 the theatre was taken over by United Artists and the name changed from Loew's State to the State Theatre. In 1963 the State was acquired by Metropolitan Theatres and it went on to feature many general release movies dubbed into Spanish. Metropolitan Theatres closed the State in 1997.

The auditorium space is virtually square in shape, originally seating 2,450 (current capacity 2,387). Directly above the center of the proscenium arch, occupying a small niche, is a seated Billiken figure. The theatre boasts a vibrant fire/safety curtain, by Armstrong-Powers, depicting a futuristic fantasy city of onion-domed towers surrounded by planets and comet trails.

The State Theatre is currently managed by the Broadway Theatre Group, who also manage the Palace, Los Angeles, and Tower theatres in the Broadway Theatre District.

The theatre was on a long-term lease to the Universal Church of the Kingdom of God, who called it the "Cathedral of Faith", which came to an end in early 2018. As of January 2018 the owners are seeking a new tenant.

== Use as a filming location ==
- Gypsy (1993)
- What's Love Got To Do With It (1993)
- Wild Bill (1995)
- "A Thousand Miles" - Vanessa Carlton (Music Video)

In the "A Thousand Miles" music video, Carlton is seen playing her piano outside the theatre with people in the background, such as a breakdancer with a crowd around him.

Filming for Wild Bill involved re-draping the proscenium arch with swags and soft decorations that remain in place as of 2011.

== Gallery ==
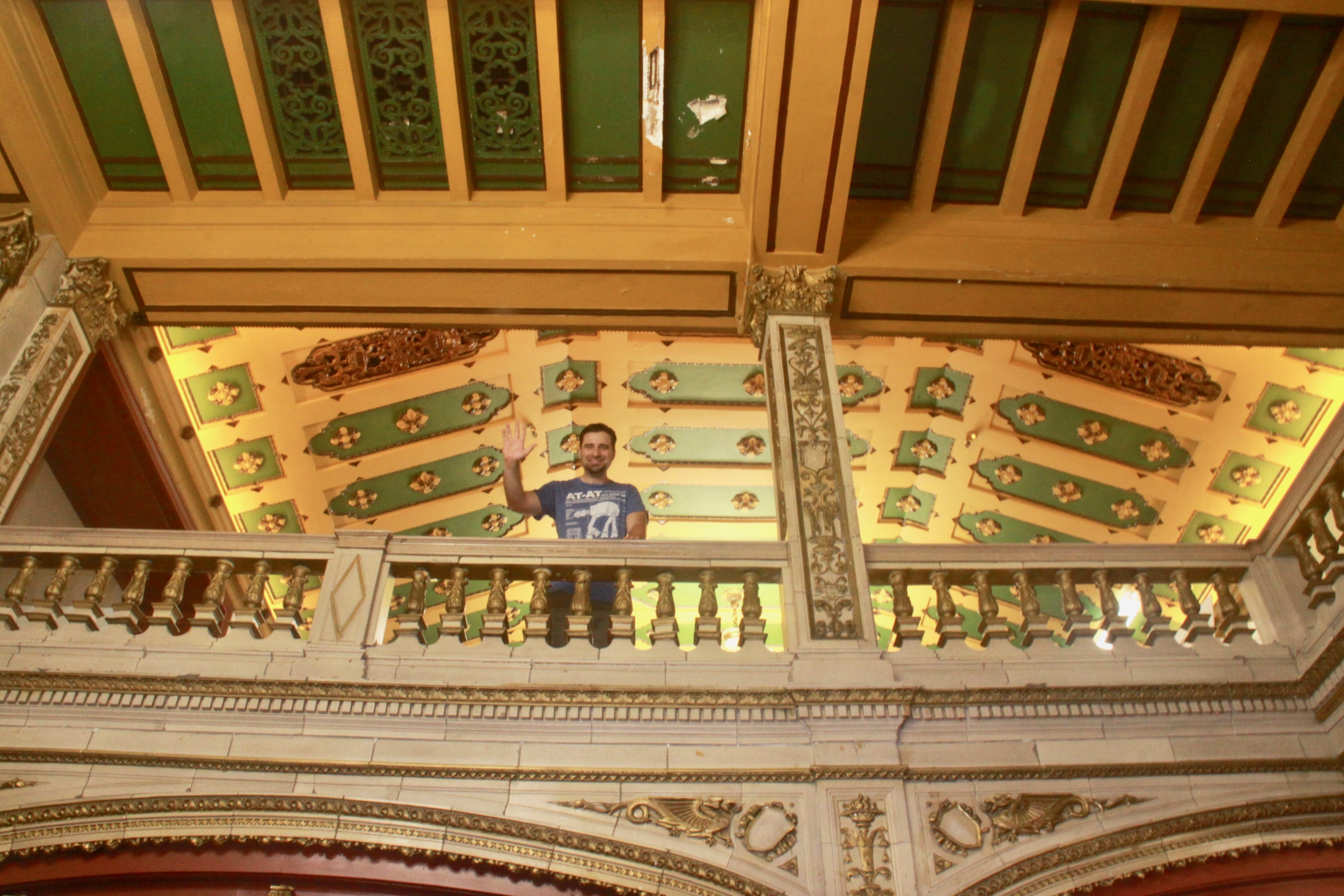
Clerestory

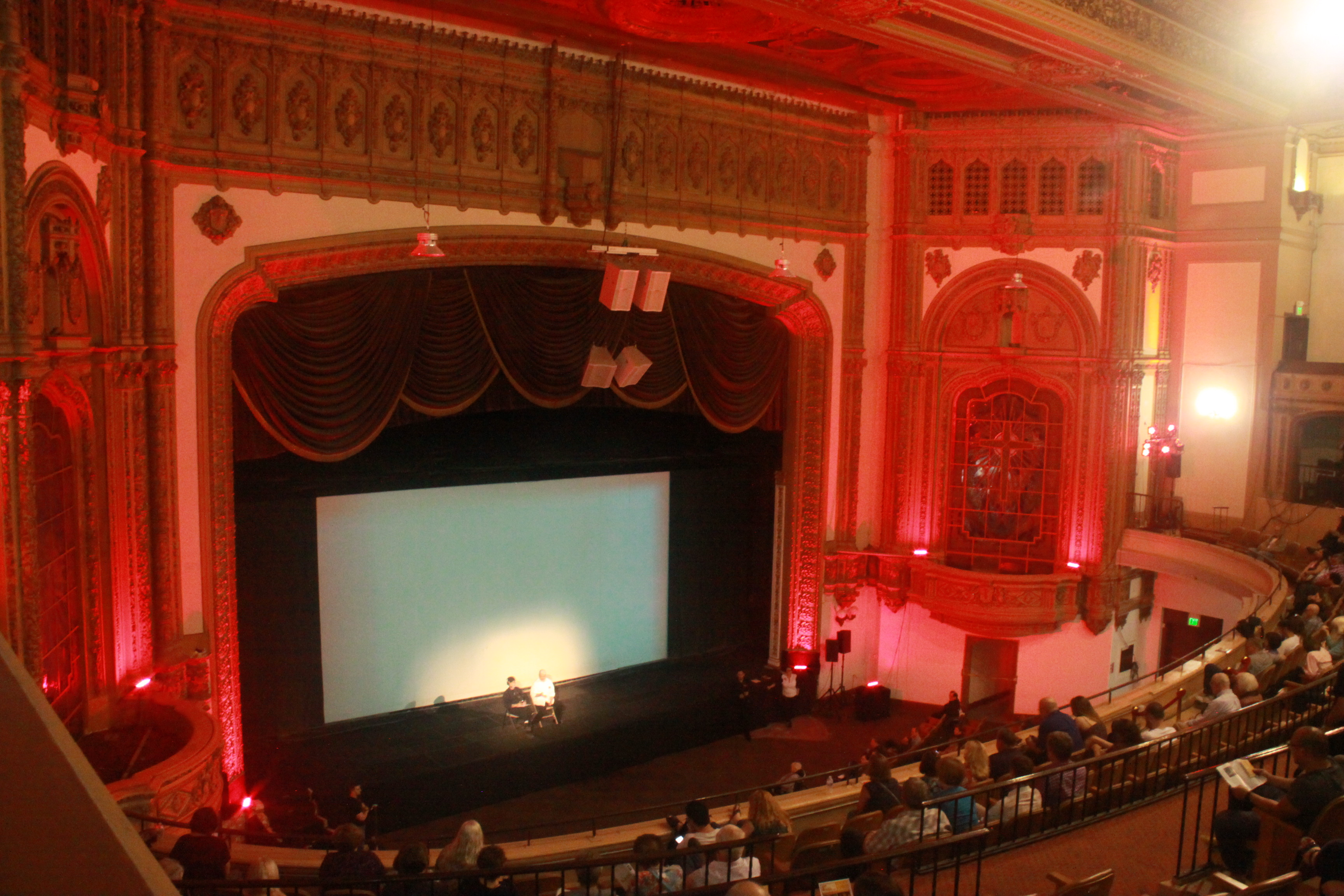
Auditorium

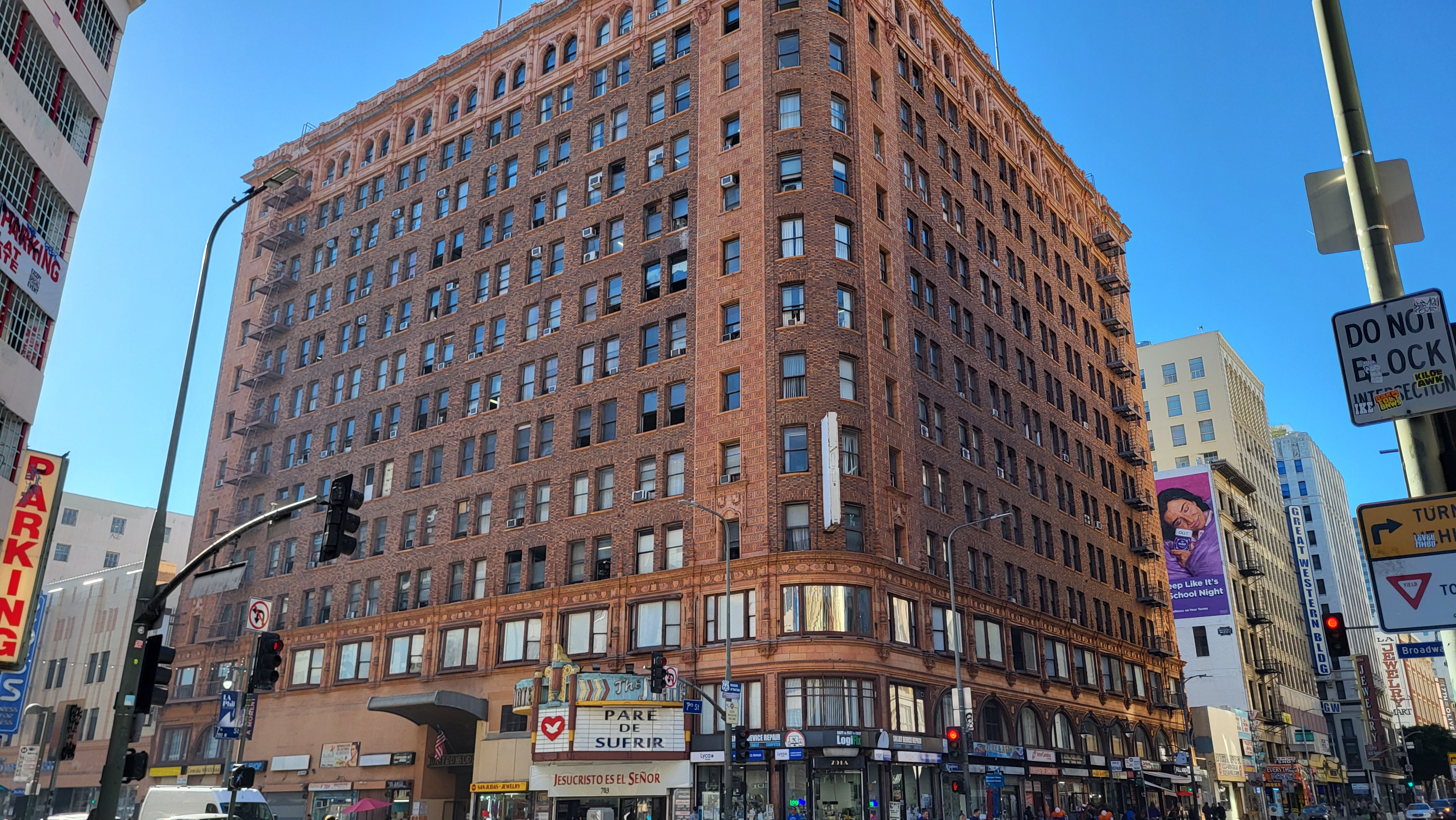
The building in 2025

== Partners ==
- BizBash - Issues publications and e-newsletters, maintains blogs, and creates trade shows and award shows with business entertainment specialists, entertainment promoters, and advertising, public relations, marketing, and managers in the area of human resources.
- City of Los Angeles Department of Cultural Affairs - The department serves purpose by creating and preserving high-quality arts and culture opportunities.
- FilmWorks L.A. - Is a stakeholder-led educational and awareness program centered on Los Angeles filmmaking.

== See also ==
- List of Los Angeles Historic-Cultural Monuments in Downtown Los Angeles
- List of contributing properties in the Broadway Theater and Commercial District
