= Albert Sutton (architect) =

American architect (1867–1923)

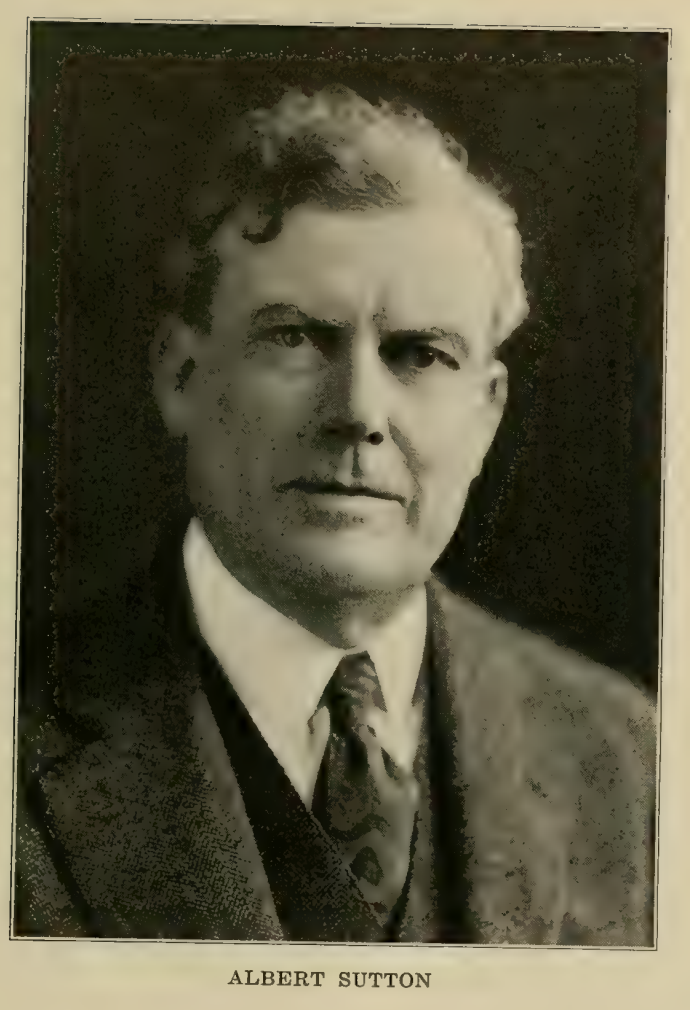
- Sutton in 1922
- Born: June 6, 1867; Victoria, British Columbia, Canada
- Died: November 18, 1923 (aged 56); Tacoma, Washington, U.S.
- Education: University of California, Berkeley
- Occupation: Architect
- Spouse(s): Ethel F. Meek, 1894–1908; Marie L. Hewitt, 1909–1923
- Children: Alberta, Anna (Meek); Rocena, John (Hewitt)
- Practice: James Pickles, 1888–1892; Charles Peter Weeks, 1903–1910; Harrison Allen Whitney, 1912–1923

Albert Sutton (June 6, 1867 – November 18, 1923) was a Canadian-born American architect active in the Pacific Northwest.

== Early life and education ==
Albert Sutton was born on June 6, 1867, in Victoria, British Columbia, the eighth of nine children to John and Anna Sutton. His father led a seafaring life as chief engineer in the Pacific Squadron of the U.S. Navy during the 1860s and was on the George S. Wright Steamer when it disappeared in January 1873 off Sitka, Alaska, on its way back to Portland, Oregon.

Sutton grew up in Portland, where his family moved when he was a young boy, and attended public schools there. He relocated to Berkeley, California, for two years of study at the University of California.

== Career ==
He then became a draftsman for the Southern Pacific Railroad, working on railroad bridges and buildings for three years.

=== Pickles & Sutton, Tacoma ===
In 1888, Sutton moved to Tacoma, Washington, during its railroad boomtown period, when it served as the western terminus of the newly completed northern transcontinental railroad. Sutton, in his early twenties, fortunately was able to became a junior partner with architect James Pickles, who was thirty. Together, Pickles & Sutton designed many of the historic commercial buildings in Tacoma in the early boom years, using design elements from the Romanesque Revival style which was in vogue at the time. Their portfolio included the Sprague Block (1888); the Sprague Building (1889); the U.S. Post Office (1889); the Abbot Building (1889); the Uhlman Block (1889); the Baker Building (1889); the Wolf Building (1889); the Dougan Block (1890); the Holmes & Ball Furniture Co. (1890); the Joy Block (1892); and the Berlin Building (1892).

In 1894, Sutton married Ethel F. Meek of San Lorenzo, California, moving to San Francisco the following year, where they had two daughters, Alberta and Anna.

=== Sutton & Weeks, San Francisco ===
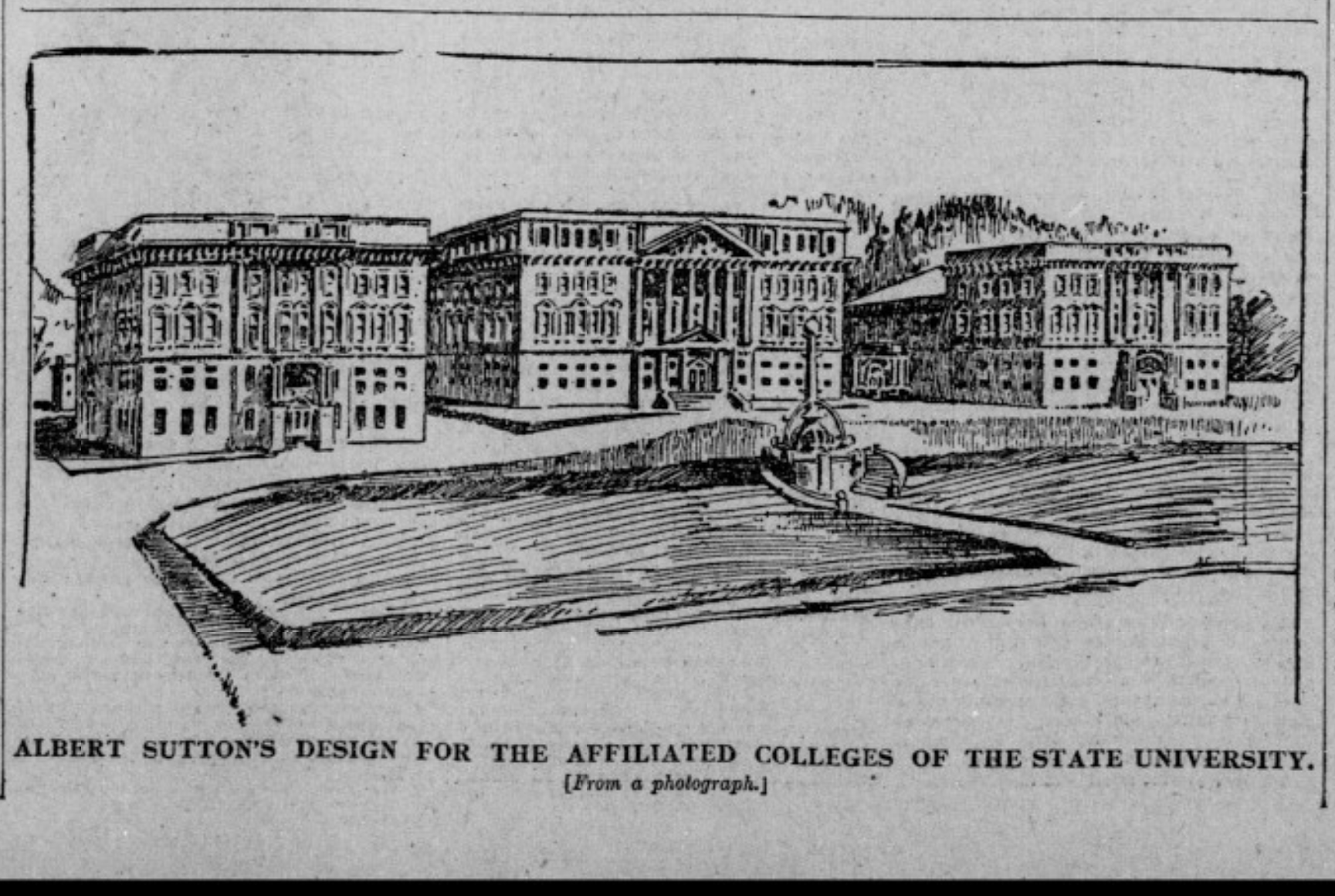
Albert Sutton's design of new buildings to house affiliated colleges of the University of California: San Francisco Call, 8 February 1896

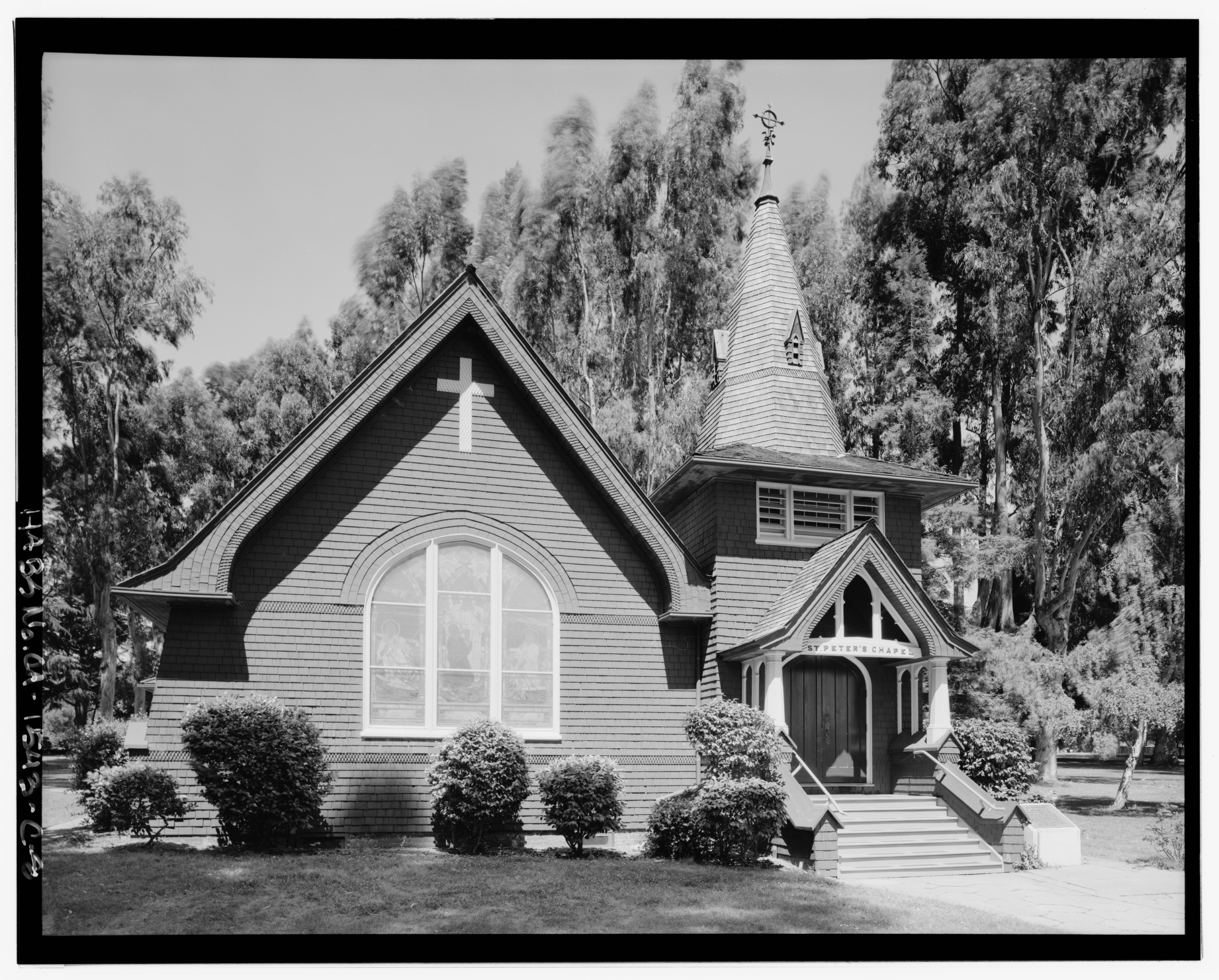
St. Peter's Chapel, Mare Island: designed by Albert Sutton, 1900, NRHP-listed

In San Francisco, Sutton entered a 1895 design competition for new buildings to house the affiliated colleges of the University of California, including the College of Medicine, the College of Dentistry & Pharmacy, and the College of Law. Although he did not win the award, he garnered among five finalists the largest support of the board of regents on its first two ballots and established his presence as an architect.

In 1896, he designed a new building for the Good Samaritan Mission near 2nd and Folsom Streets in San Francisco. The following year, he was selected by the board of trustees to design a new $125,000 homeopathic hospital on Lake street between 14th and 15th avenues of San Francisco, with support from philanthropist Phoebe Hearst for a children's ward. In 1900, he designed the St. Peter's Chapel, Mare Island, which was dedicated in 1901. It is listed in the National Register of Historic Places and is the oldest extant U.S. Navy chapel.

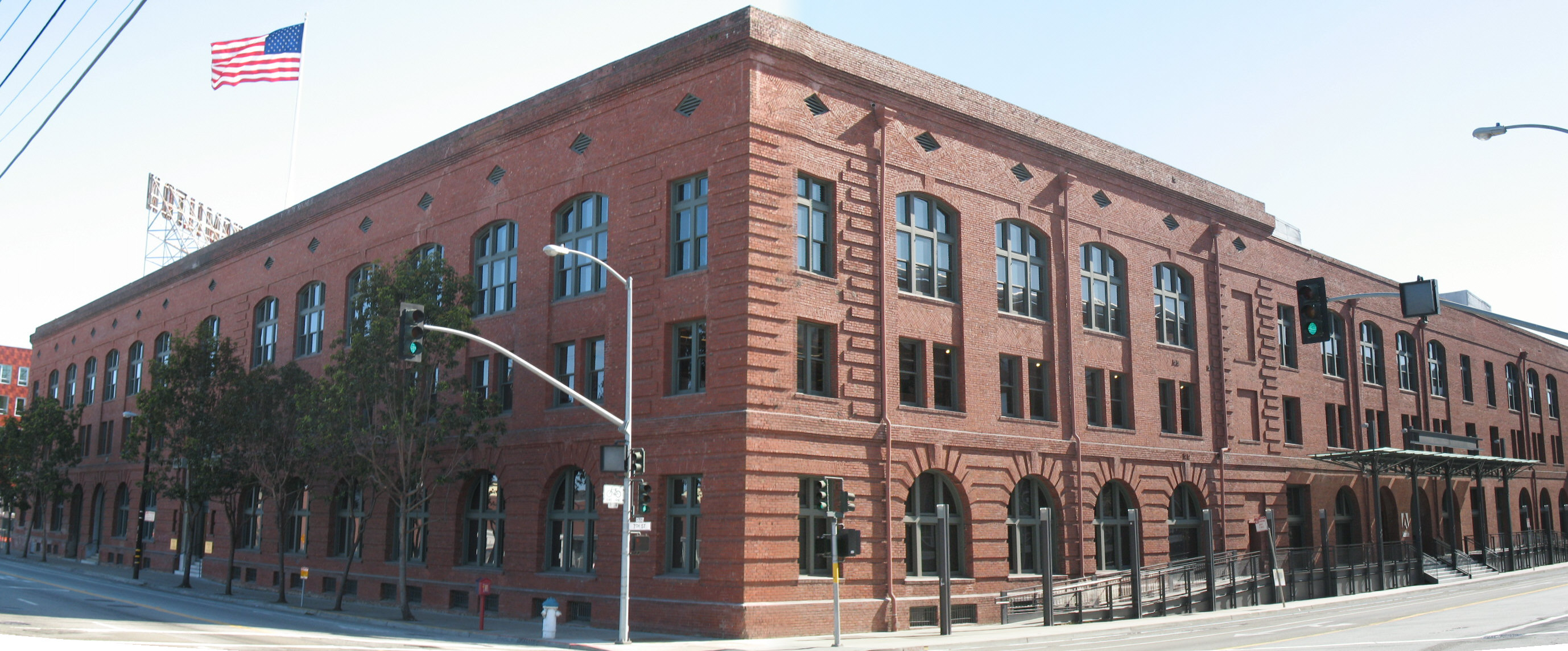
Baker and Hamilton Building: formerly, Pacific Hardware and Steel Company Building, designed by Sutton & Weeks, 1904, NRHP listed

Around 1903, Sutton formed the firm of Sutton & Weeks with junior partner Charles Peter Weeks (1870–1928), which increased his reach in California. Their portfolio ranged from the Pacific Hardware and Steel Company Building (San Francisco, 1904), which is listed in the National Register of Historic Places, to the Citizens' National Bank of San Francisco (1905), and the Zeta Psi House in Berkeley (1910). Other works designed were, according to historian Carey, "the Farmers & Merchants Bank at Oakland, the John A. Roebling's Sons Company building at San Francisco, said to be one of the best examples of fireproof construction in the country...". Moreover, Sutton & Weeks bested the state competition in 1906 to obtain the premium controlling contract to remodel the California State Capitol in Sacramento. As the senior partner, Sutton spent much time working with the state capitol commission, which consisted of Governor Pardee, Secretary of State Curry, and State Treasurer Reeves; this resulted in state appropriations of almost $700,000 for the remodeling project completed in 1908.

After a public contested divorce and child custody battle in the courts, Sutton received custody of the two daughters, remarried in 1909 to Marie L. Hewitt of Tacoma, and retired to a ranch in Hood River, Oregon, the following year – only in his early forties. His second marriage added two children, Rocena and John Hewitt.

=== Sutton & Whitney, Portland ===
Sutton resumed his practice of architecture in 1912, when he returned to his childhood city of Portland, and joined forces with junior partner Harrison Allen Whitney (1877–1962). The two formed a prosperous alliance for more than a decade.

This success of the Portland office enabled him to open in 1918 a branch office in Tacoma, back where he got his first break in architectural practice 30 years prior. Dividing his time between the two offices, Sutton supervised their many activities, which included (circa 1922) the construction of the Multnomah County Hospital at a cost over one million dollars, the Meier & Frank Warehouse, costing one million dollars, and the Scottish Rite Cathedrals in Portland and Tacoma.

== Death ==
Sutton died at the home of his mother-in-law in Tacoma, of congestive heart failure, on November 18, 1923, aged 56. At the time of his death, he was supervising several projects in Tacoma, including the Annie Wright seminary and the new College of Puget Sound campus. According to the Pacific Builder and Engineer, Sutton "was, with one exception, the oldest practicing architect on the [West] Coast."
