= Baker and Hamilton Building =

- U.S. National Register of Historic Places
- San Francisco Designated Landmark
- California Historical Landmark
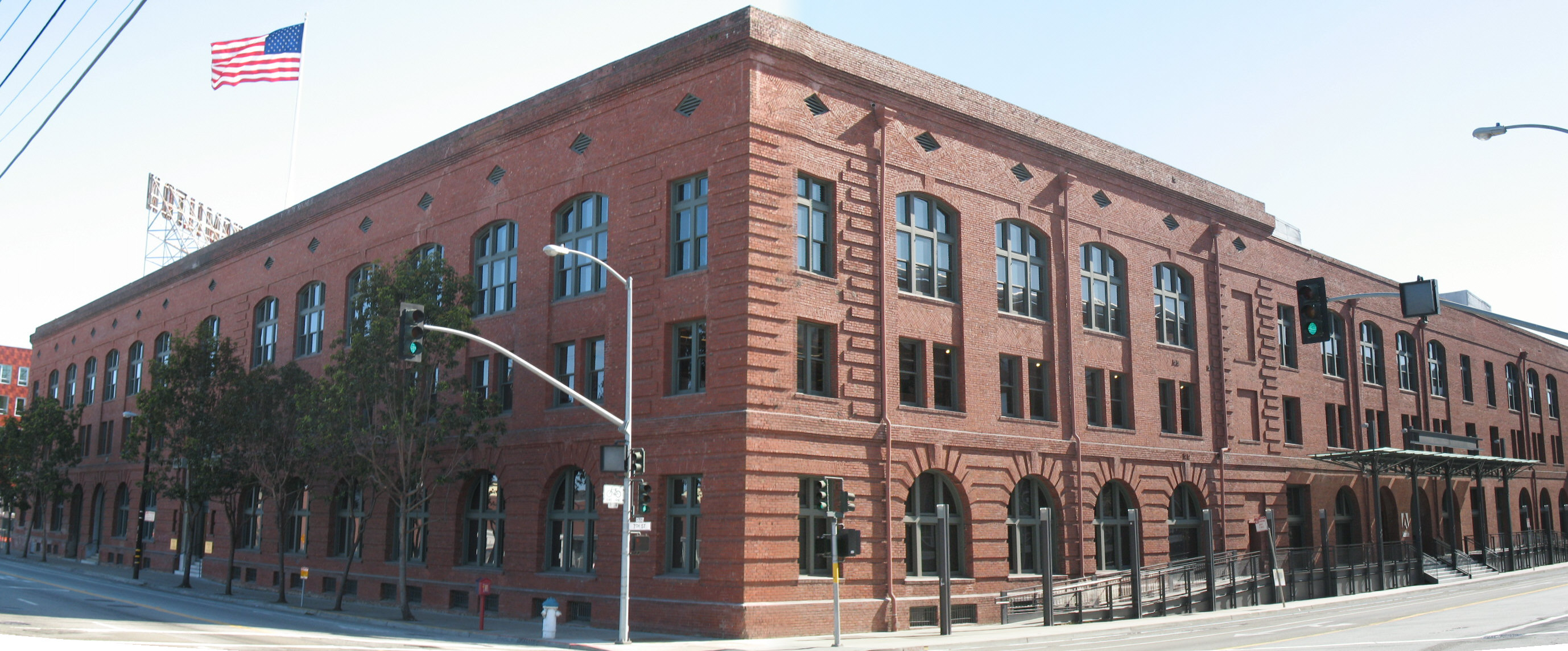

- Location within San Francisco County Location within California Location within the United States
- Location: 601 Townsend Street, San Francisco, California, U.S.
- Coordinates: 37°46′17″N 122°24′7″W
- Area: 1.5 acres (0.61 ha)
- Built: 1905
- Architects: Sutton, Albert; Weeks, Charles Peter
- Architectural style: Early Commercial
- NRHP reference No.: 05000001
- SFDL No.: 193
- CHISL No.: N2273

Significant dates
- Added to NRHP: February 9, 2005
- Designated SFDL: April 6, 1989
- Designated CHISL: February 9, 2005

The Baker and Hamilton Building, also known as Pacific Hardware and Steel Company Building and Baker, Hamilton and Pacific Company, is a historic office building and former commercial building built in 1905, and located in South of Market at 601 Townsend Street in San Francisco, California.

The Baker and Hamilton Building listed as a San Francisco Designated Landmark since April 6, 1989; listed as a California Historic Landmark since February 9, 2005; and listed on the National Register of Historic Places since February 9, 2005.

== Architecture ==
The building was built in 1905 for the Pacific Hardware and Steel Company, and was designed by architects Albert Sutton (1867–1923) and Charles Peter Weeks (1870–1928). The building is 150,000 sq. ft. in floor area. During the 1906 San Francisco earthquake the building survived.

== History ==
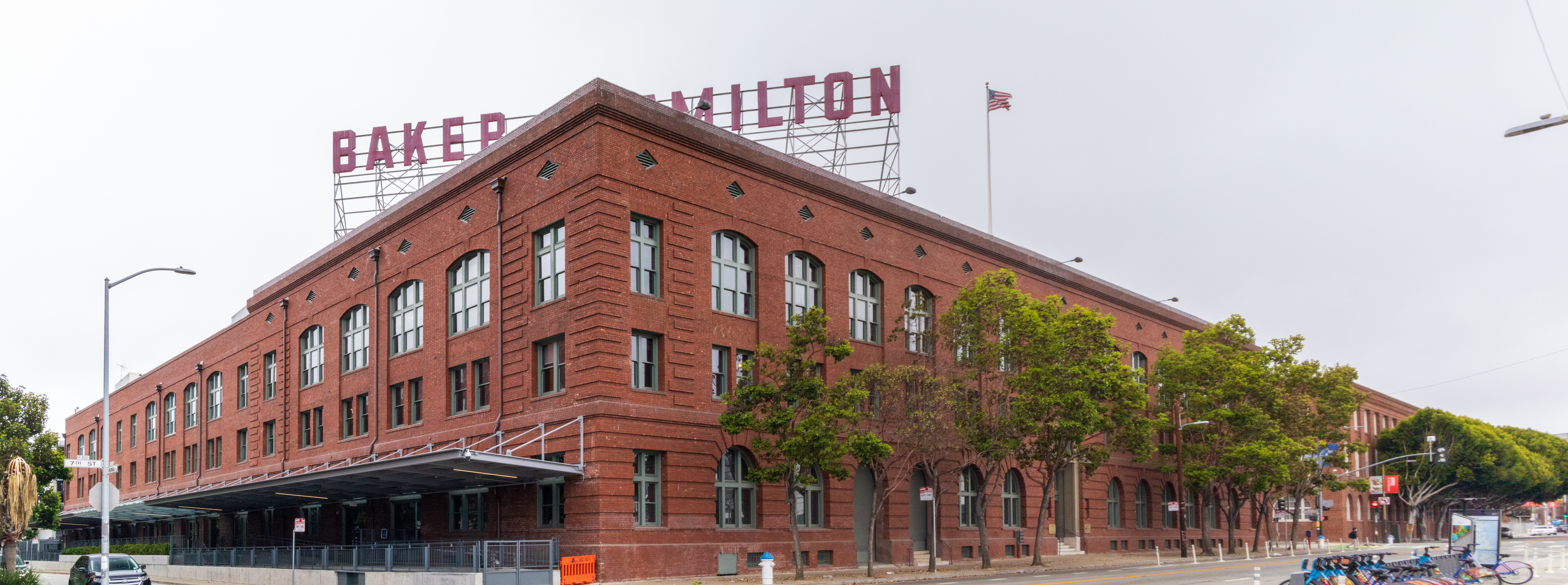
The Baker & Hamilton sign is visible from the corner of 7th Street and King Street

In 1918, Pacific Hardware and Steel Company merged with the Baker and Hamilton Company. The Baker and Hamilton was founded as a California Gold Rush-era mining supply and hardware store company, by Livingston Low Baker and Robert Muirhead Hamilton in Mormon Island. They grew in popularity in Sacramento, because of the proximity to mines. The company had a second store location at Front and California Street in San Francisco, active from 1867 until 1906, which was destroyed in the 1906 earthquake.

The building was converted in the year 2000 into office space for Organic, Inc. During the dot-com downturn space went unused, until Macromedia in 2005; and then Adobe Systems moved in during 2007 after buying Macromedia.
