= Jewelry District (Los Angeles) =

- Neighborhood of Los Angeles
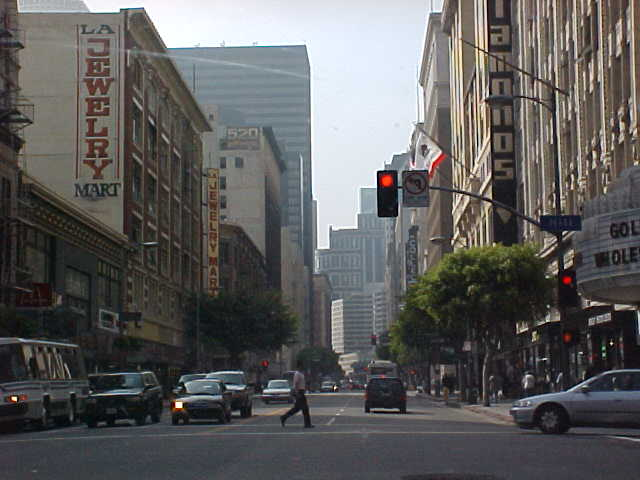
- Street level in the Jewelry District, on Seventh Street, facing West and the Financial District
- Interactive map of Jewelry District
- Coordinates: 34°02′45″N 118°15′16″W
- Country: United States
- State: California
- County: County of Los Angeles
- City: Los Angeles
- Area code: 213

The Jewelry District is a section of Downtown Los Angeles where a variety of jewelry is sold.

== History ==
The Jewelry District is predominantly made up of early twentieth-century buildings. Half of the area falls under the greater "Historic Core" of downtown Los Angeles, which spans between Hill and Main Streets, and 3rd and 9th streets. The median year in which the buildings in the area were built was 1923. The oldest building to remain in the district is located on 543 South Broadway Avenue—a three-story, 32,600-square-foot commercial space that is now occupied by Teresa's Bridals.

=== Creation ===
The influx of jewelry stores in the area did not come about until after the 1960s, when gold came to be seen as a safer investment than U.S. dollars. Gold was a great attraction and it was indeed popular not only for its benefits, but for the style it gave. Before this surge, the California Jewelry Mart dominated the local industry with its establishment on 607 S. Hill Street.

The district became even more popular with the opening of Saint Vincent Jewelry Center, housed in the former Bullock's complex with a European-inspired alley of restaurants. Across from St. Vincent's is the State Theater building, a twelve-story red brick office building and theater. Across from the theater was another office building, one that accommodated a drug store in the early 20th century. Behind the theater, along 7th street, is Spreckels Building, an office building turned garment manufacturing center, and Provident Loan Association, a not-for-profit organization that provided short term loans for gold and jewelry. It was the last remaining of the many not-for-profit loan societies of the late 19th and early 20th century. Also on Hill Street in this area is Jasper Building, a 14-story office building built in 1928, and Warner Bros. Downtown Building, a 9-story theater and office building built in 1920, both of which were converted to accommodate jewelry manufacturing.

== Borders ==
The Jewelry District is bordered by Hill, Broadway, 5th, and 8th streets.

=== Density ===
Almost all of the buildings within the Jewelry District were designed for general office use with retail spaces on the street level, with some large venues, such as the historic Loew’s State Theatre on 703 S. Broadway, which was built in 1923. In the early twentieth-century, downtown was rapidly developing but it did not feature skyscrapers as tall as Chicago and New York. The buildings were limited to 150 feet by law, which was favored by architects and planners who saw the towering skyscrapers of the east coast metropolises as unsustainable and not conducive to the Southern California lifestyle. Although many residents were living in apartment buildings at the time, the architects and planners argued that excessive vertical expansion would lead to inhumane overconcentration and congestion. This was ultimately not the case and many people were attracted to the area which led to increased business.

== Transportation ==
The Los Angeles Jewelry District can be accessed by public transportation through the Metro B Line to Pershing Square station. The district is southeast of the square.

== Points of interest ==
- California Jewelry Mart
- St.Vincent Jewelry Center
- Los Angeles Jewelry Center
