= Davis & Davis =

American architectural partnership

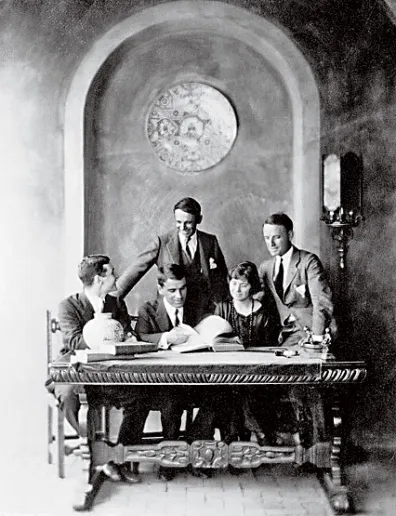
Davis siblings. Davis & Davis are Pierpont Davis, standing in the center of the photograph, and Walter S. Davis, seated with a brother to his right and their sister to his left

Davis & Davis was an architecture firm in Los Angeles, California made up of brothers F. Pierpont and Walter S. Davis.

== Partners ==
=== Francis Pierpont Davis ===
Francis Pierpont Davis
- Born: December 27, 1884; Baltimore, Maryland
- Died: July 5, 1953 (aged 68); Los Angeles, California
- Education: Baltimore City College; Maryland Institute of Design, Engineering, and Mathematics
- Occupation: Architect
- Practice: Davis & Davis (1916-1942+)

Medal record

Men's sailing

Representing the United States

Olympic Games
Gold medal – first place	1932 Los Angeles	8 metre class

Francis Pierpont Davis, who went by Pierpont Davis, was born in 1884 in Baltimore, Maryland to Frank Earlougher Davis, an architect, and Annie Legate Swindell. He was older than three brothers, William, Walter, and Henry, and one sister, Dorothy. The family also had one servant.

Pierpont attended Baltimore City College for one year and the Maryland Institute of Design, Engineering, and Mathematics for three. In 1907, he moved to Los Angeles and in 1909, he married Gertrude Alberta Churchill in Santa Monica, California. They had two kids together, and also lived with a nurse and a cook. Pierpont also served in World War I.

From 1924 to 1925, Pierpont and Gertrude traveled across Europe and North Africa, with destinations that included the British Isles, France, Italy, Spain, Switzerland, Norway, Sweden, Denmark, Tunisia, Morocco, Egypt, and Algeria. Pierpont also served on the 1932 Olympics international jury and competed in eight-meter class sailing, where he won gold as the oldest member of brother-in-law Owen Churchill's boat, the Angelita. Pierpont sailed his own ship, the Santa Maria, in tryouts and placed second to Churchill's first.

Pierpont was a member of the Allied Architects of Los Angeles and he also worked as an assistant to the Chief Architect on the Pentagon Project in Washington, D.C. in 1941. He also served as president of the Los Angeles City Art Commission and was a founding director of the South Coast Corinthian Yacht Club in 1933.

Pierpont stool 5 foot 11.5 inches tall, had brown eyes and black hair, and had a scar over his left eye. He died in Los Angeles in 1953.

=== Walter Swindell Davis ===
Walter Swindell Davis
- Born: November 7, 1887; Baltimore, Maryland
- Died: September 19, 1973 (aged 85); Los Angeles County California
- Education: Massachusetts Institute of Technology, BS 1910, MS 1911
- Occupation: Architect
- Practice: Davis & Davis (1916-1942+)

Walter Swindell Davis was born in 1887 in Baltimore, Maryland to Frank Earlougher Davis, an architect, and Annie Legate Swindell. He was the middle child of four brothers, Emmitt, Pierpont, Henry, and himself, and one sister, Dorothy. The family also had one servant.

Walter attended Massachusetts Institute of Technology for both his bachelor's and master's degrees, the former of which he obtained in 1910 and the latter in 1911. By 1916, he had moved to Los Angeles, and he also served in World War I.

Walter died in 1973. His last known residence was in Long Beach, California.

=== Partnership ===
Pierpont and Walter partnered in Los Angeles in 1916. They had an office in the Exchange Building in 1918 and one on 6th Street from at least 1937 to 1942.

Employees/associates of theirs include Olive Chadeayne, George Julius Lind, and Henry Franklin Withey.

==== Henry Franklin Withey ====
Henry Franklin Withey
- Born: February 4, 1880; Lynn, Massachusetts
- Died: October 17, 1969 (aged 89)
- Occupation: Architect

Henry Franklin Withey was born in 1880 in Lynn, Massachusetts to John F. Withey, a printer, farmer, and laborer, and Martha Peckham Withey. Henry was the eldest of one brother and two sisters.

Henry and his family moved to Los Angeles sometime between 1900 and 1910. By 1920, Henry was married to Elsie Rathburn, an immigrant who came to the United States in 1884 and was naturalized in 1900. Elsie worked as an assistant in Henry's office, and the two wrote the Biographical Dictionary of American Architects together.

Professionally, Henry's association with Davises began c. 1911, when he and Pierpont won first place in a competition to build Santa Ana High School. Henry and the Davises shared offices from c. 1918 to 1922, and while they worked on many projects together during their association, Henry was never officially a partner.

Henry was the vice president of the Los Angeles Architectural Club in 1915. He also worked with Clifford Balch.

Henry was 5 feet 10.5 inches tall and had blue eyes and brown hair. He died in 1969.

== Selected works ==
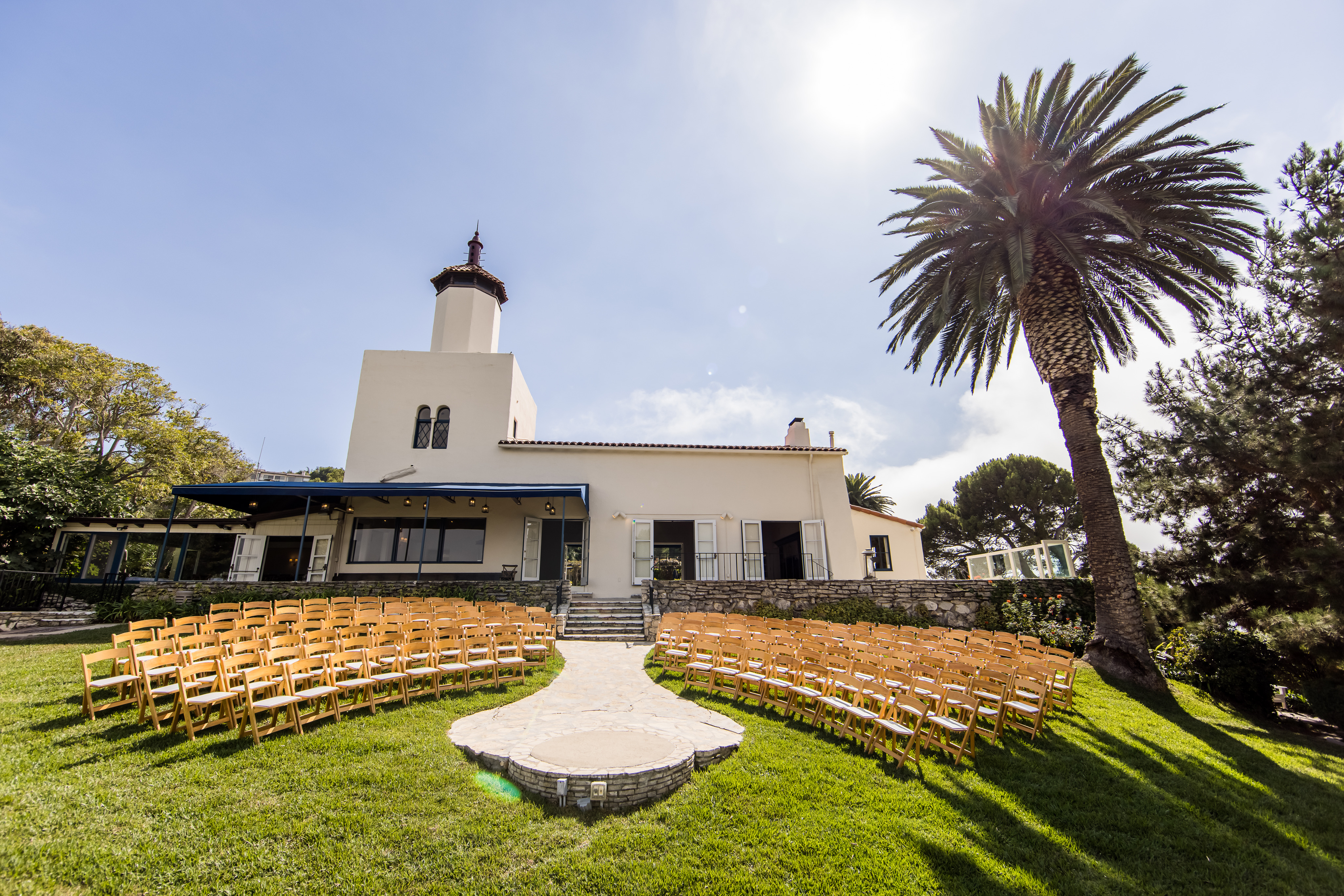
La Venta Inn

=== Davis and Davis ===
- 2027 N Serrano Avenue (1921), contributor to the Oxford-Serrano-Hobart Residential Historic District
- H. M. Easton & Morris Mumper Residence (1921), contributor to the Oxford-Serrano-Hobart Residential Historic District
- Castelar Street School (1922)
- La Venta Inn (1923)
- St. John's Episcopal Church (1923), LAHCM No. 47
- Conant House (1924)
- Anna Desmond Residence (1925)

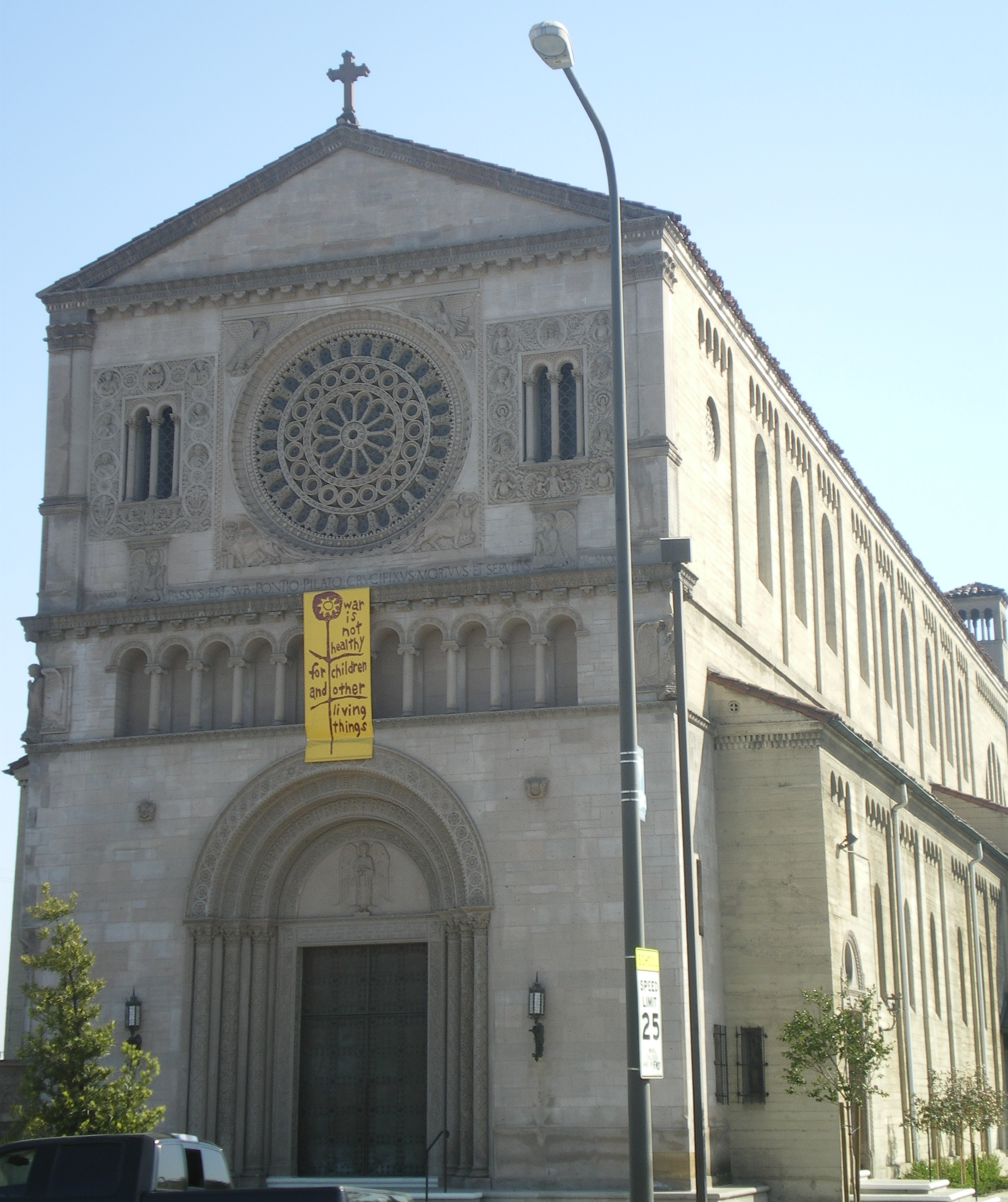
St. John’s Cathedral

- St. John’s Cathedral (1925), LAHCM No. 516, NRHP No. 00000425
- Roman Gardens (1926), LAHCM No. 397
- Los Angeles Public Library Echo Park Branch No. 2 (1927-1928)
- Villa d'Este Apartments (1928)

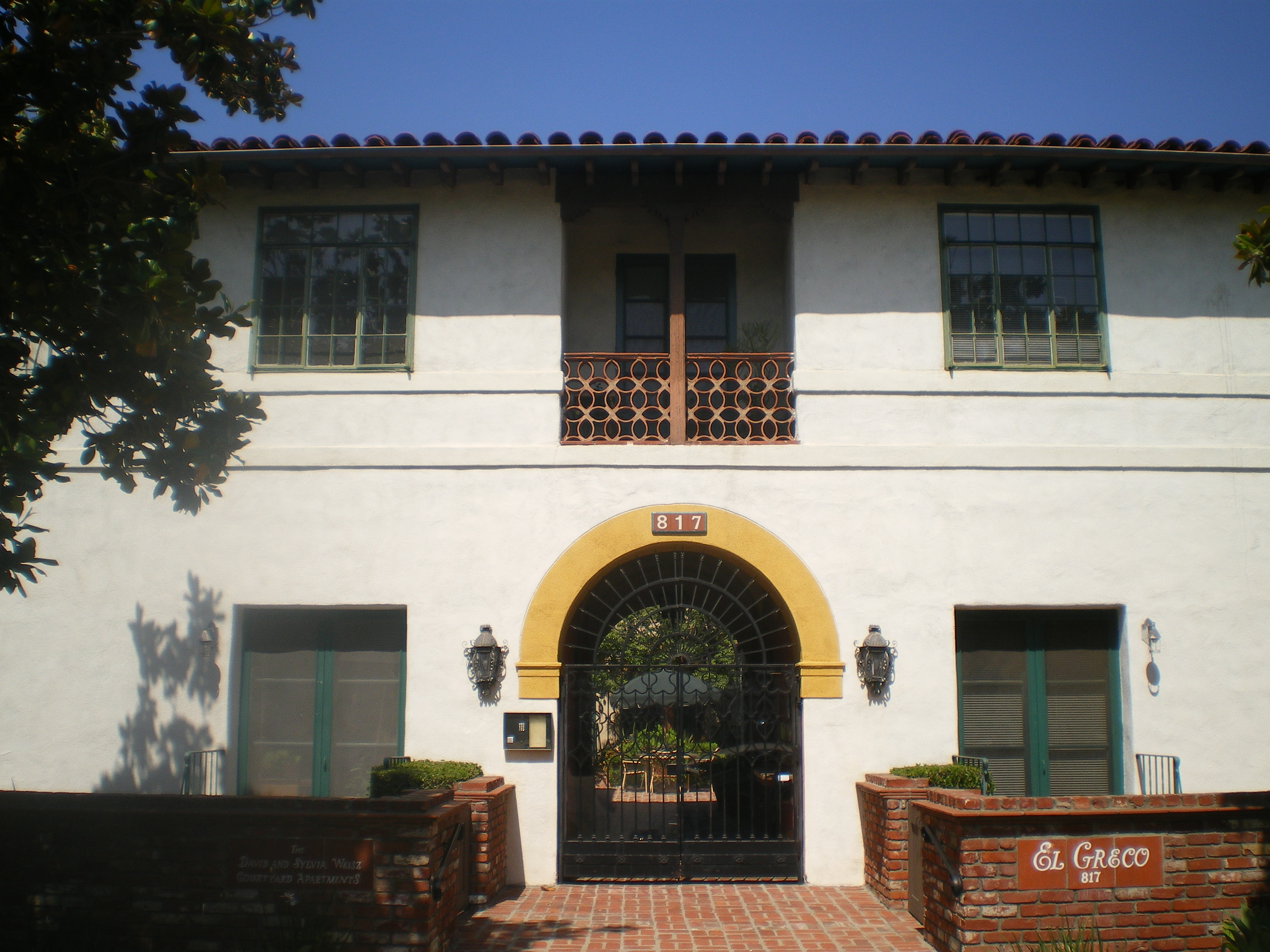
El Greco Apartments

- El Greco Apartments (1929), LAHCM No. 231, NRHP No. 88002017
- Huntington Palisades Spec House (1929)
- Kappa Alpha Theta Sorority House, University of California Los Angeles (1930), contributor to the UCLA Sorority Row Historic District

==== With Withey ====
- Villa Capistrano/Julian Eltinge House (1918)

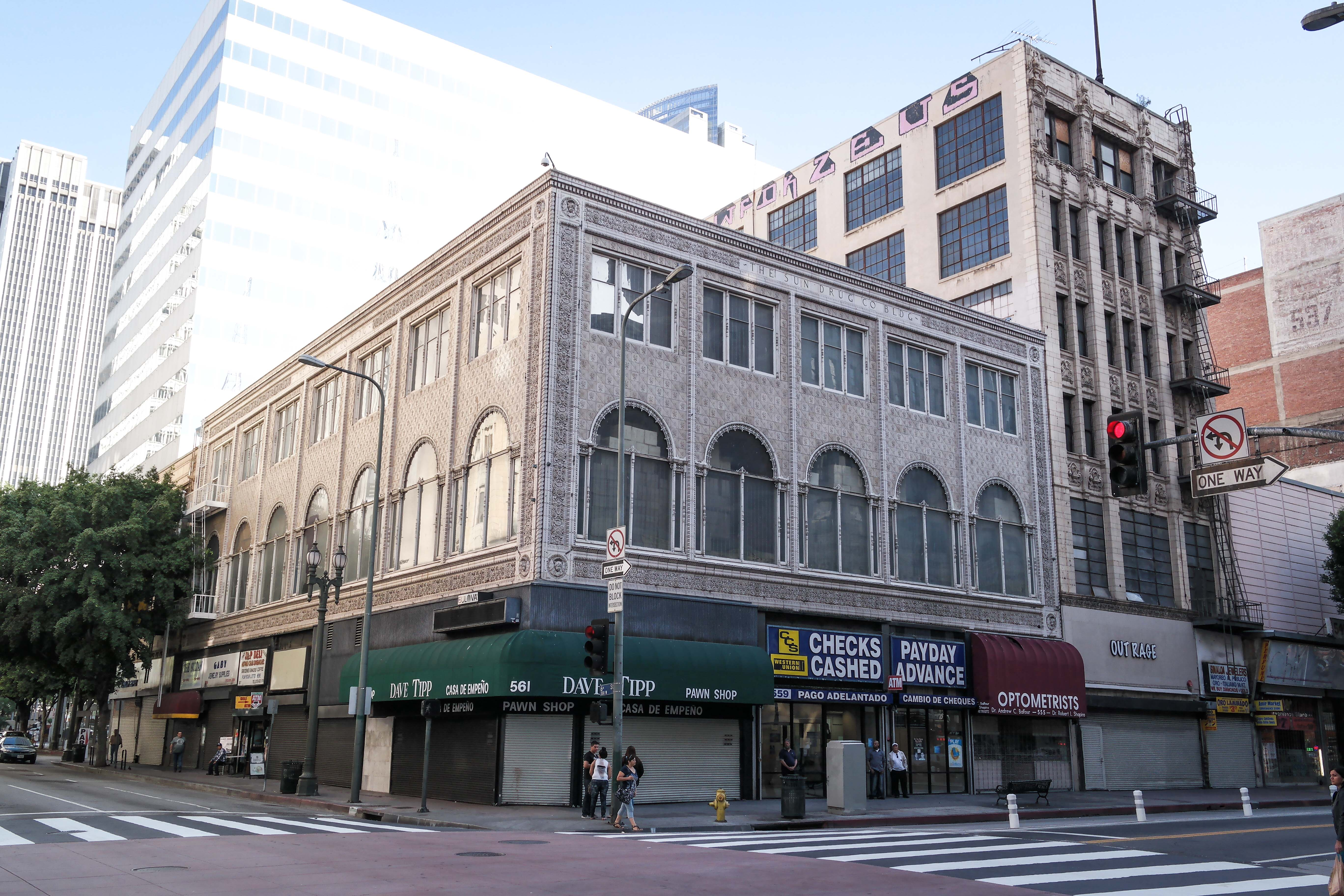
Swelldom Building

- Swelldom Building (1920), contributing property in the NRHP-listed Broadway Theater and Commercial District

=== Pierpont Davis ===
- F. Pierpont Davis House (1921)
- Pierson Residence (1925), LAHCM No. 630
- The Pentagon (1941-1942), NRHP No. 89000932

==== With Withey ====
- Artesia Grammar School (1911)
- Farmers and Merchants Bank of Santa Paula branch (1911-1912) and headquarters (1913)

==== Allied Architects of Los Angeles ====
- Los Angeles Hall of Justice (1925)
- Bob Hope Patriotic Hall (1926)
- Los Angeles General Medical Center (1928)
- Hollywood Bowl Music Shell (1929)

=== Walter S. Davis ===
- Ramona Gardens (with others) (1940)
- Aliso Village (with others) (1942), demolished in 1999
- 6252 Via Canada (1960)

== See also ==
- List of American architects
- List of people from Los Angeles
