= Swelldom Building =

Building in Los Angeles, California

- U.S. Historic district – Contributing property
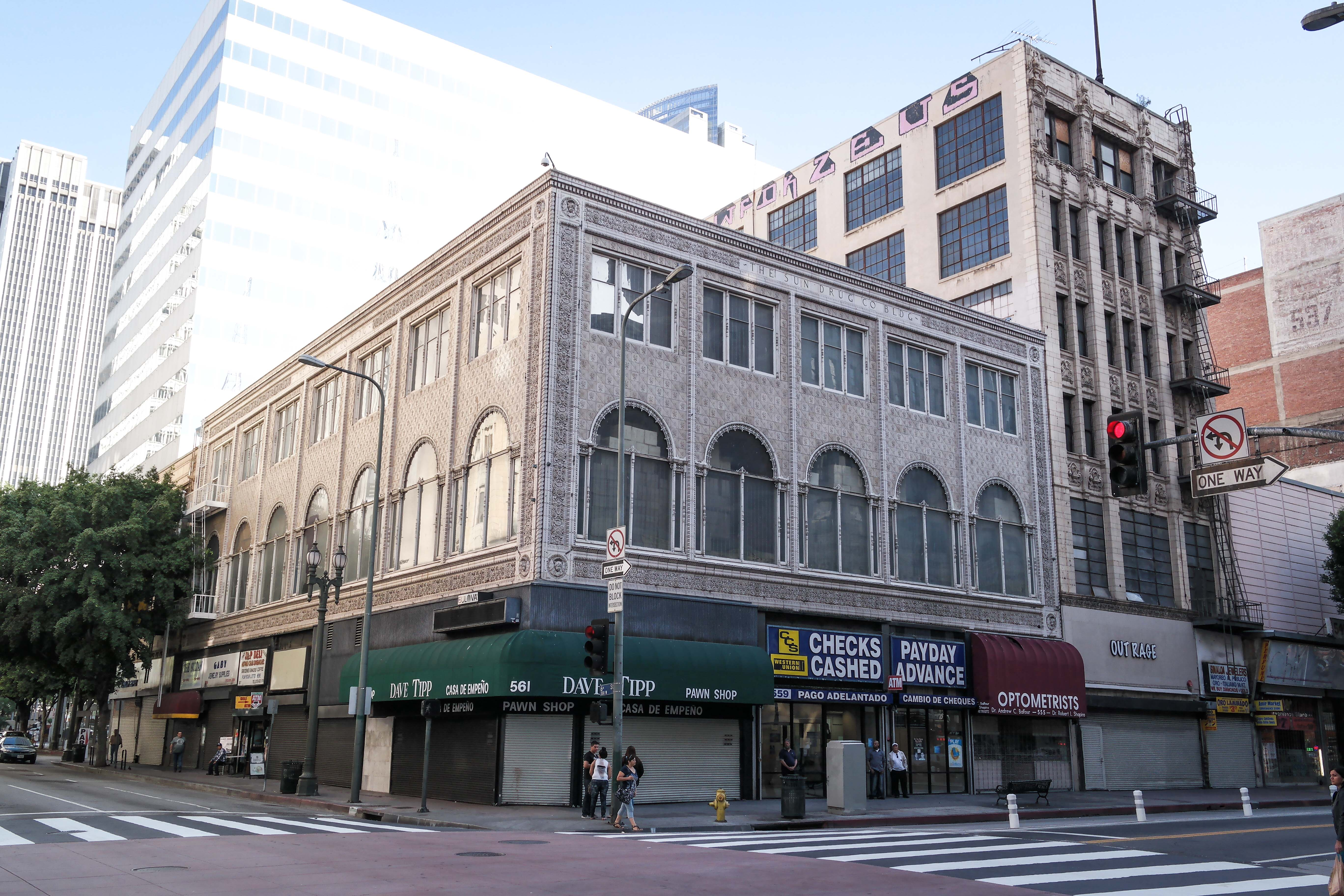
- The building in 2014

- Location within the Los Angeles metropolitan area
- Location: 559 S. Broadway and 305 W. 6th Street, Los Angeles, California
- Coordinates: 34°02′49″N 118°15′07″W
- Built: 1920
- Architect: Davis & Davis; Henry F. Withey
- Architectural style: Italian Renaissance
- Part of: Broadway Theater and Commercial District (ID79000484)
- Designated CP: May 9, 1979

Swelldom Building, also known as Sun Drug Company Building and Sun Realty Building, is a historic three-story building located at 559 S. Broadway and 305 W. 6th Street in the Jewelry District and Broadway Theater District in the historic core of downtown Los Angeles.

== History ==
Swelldom Building was built in 1920 with Davis & Davis and Henry F. Withey as architects. Swelldom moved into the building that same year.

In 1979, the Broadway Theater and Commercial District was added to the National Register of Historic Places, with Swelldom Building listed as a contributing property in the district.

== Architecture and design ==
Swelldom Building features an Italian Renaissance design and was built with reinforced concrete and a glazed terra cotta facade. The building originally had a cast iron roof trim, but it has since been removed. Bays are used to define the building's repeating architectural elements.

== See also ==
- List of contributing properties in the Broadway Theater and Commercial District
