= Roman Gardens =

Historic apartment complex in Hollywood, California. U.S.

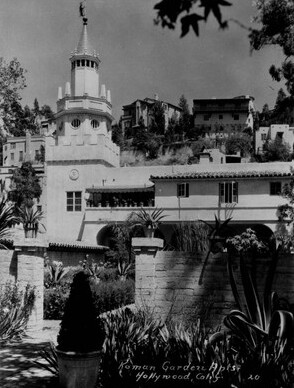
- The building in 1926

General information
- Type: Apartment complex
- Architectural style: Spanish Moorish
- Location: 2000 N. Highland Ave., Hollywood, California, U.S.
- Coordinates: 34°06′24″N 118°20′13″W
- Completed: 1926

Design and construction
- Architect: Pierpont and Walter S. Davis

Los Angeles Historic-Cultural Monument
- Designated: November 23, 1988
- Reference no.: 397

Roman Gardens, also known as Villa Valentino, is a historic 18-unit apartment complex located at 2000 N. Highland Avenue in Hollywood, California, United States. It is notable for its architecture and its alleged association with Rudolph Valentino. It was declared Los Angeles Historic-Cultural Monument No. 397 in 1988.

== History ==
Roman Gardens was designed by brothers Pierpont and Walter S. Davis and built in 1926. Rudolph Valentino is said to have used this building for secret romances; these rumors exist despite him dying before construction was completed. The building is known as Villa Valentino due to this association.

The building was declared Los Angeles Historic-Cultural Monument No. 397 on November 23, 1988.

== Architecture and design ==
Roman Gardens was designed with an appreciation for the local climate. The facade features a wooden non-functional Spanish Moorish corner tower; Italian, Spanish, and Moorish influenced bas-relief medallions; Roman busts; and animal heads that project from exterior walls. The building is two stories tall, with 18 apartment units. It also features arched corridors, hand-made tiles, wood-beamed ceilings, French doors, and decorative grillwork. Each apartment features high ceilings and a fireplace; outside of these, they are all unique, ranging from two-story maisonettes to ground floor units with inner courtyards.

The building also features a forecourt consisting of three open courtyards. The first courtyard also functions as a vestibule, while the third features an enclosed star-shaped pool. The courtyards also feature numerous plants, a brick patio, brick-lined paths, and a brick-lined raised pond.

Architecture historians David Gebhard and Robert Winter describe Roman Gardens as "one of the most elaborate of Los Angeles's garden court apartments."
