= Hall of Justice (Los Angeles) =

Building in Los Angeles

Coordinates: 34.056°N 118.243°W

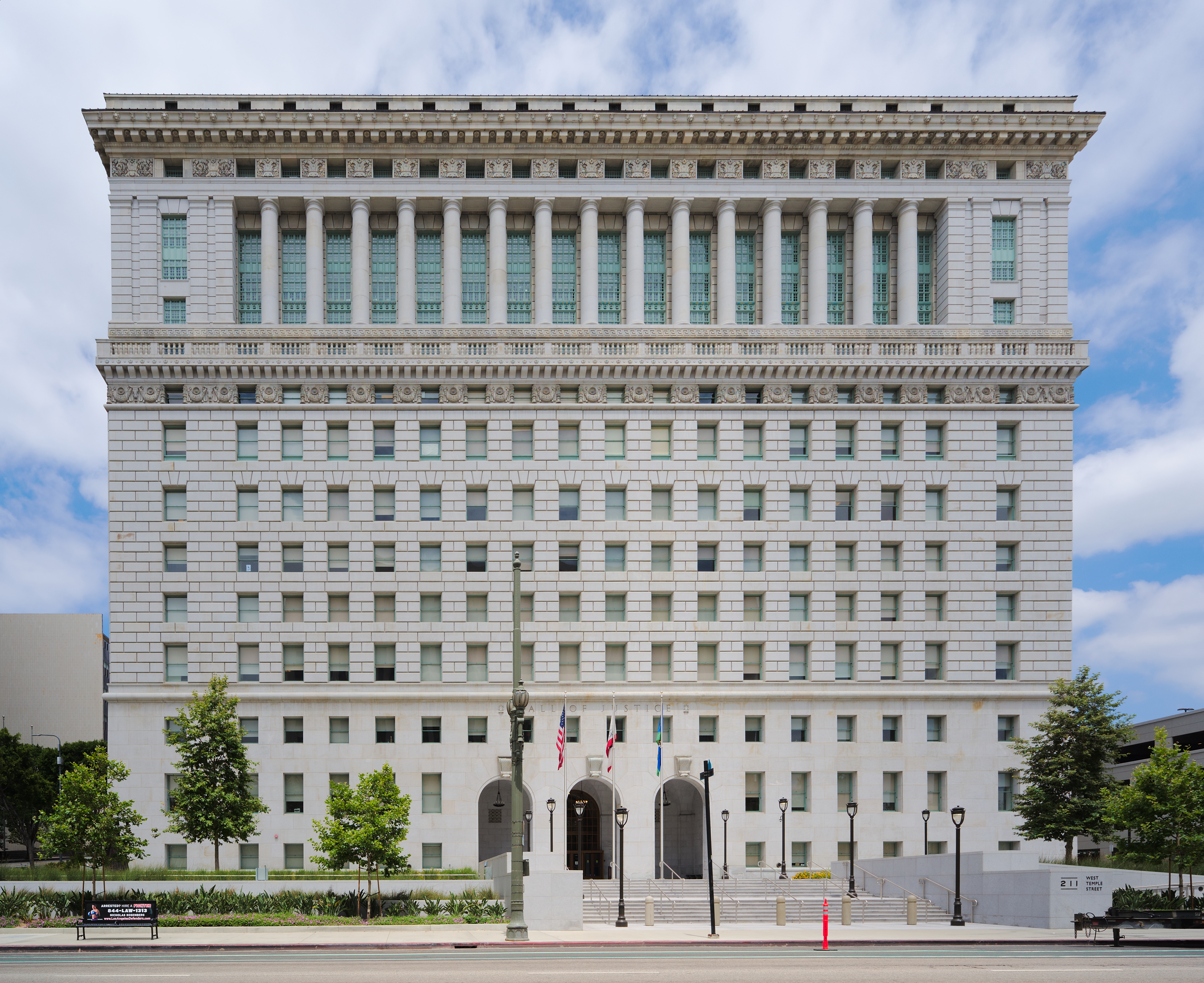

- Location within the Los Angeles metropolitan area Location within California Location within the United States

General information
- Status: Completed
- Type: Government offices
- Architectural style: Beaux-Arts
- Location: 211 W Temple St Los Angeles, California 90012
- Completed: 1925

Design and construction
- Architect: Allied Architects Association

The Hall of Justice in Los Angeles is located at 211 W. Temple Street in the Civic Center district of Downtown Los Angeles. It occupies the southern two-thirds of the block between Temple and First streets and between Broadway and Spring streets.

Built in 1925, it was together with Los Angeles City Hall the first two large buildings opened in what would over the following decades demolish and transform the late-19th-century Central Business District to a Civic Center of modern landmark buildings and plazas.

The Hall of Justice was designed in Beaux-Arts style by the Allied Architects Association, a coalition of Los Angeles-based architects founded in 1921 to design public buildings. Participating architects included Octavius Morgan, Reginald Davis Johnson, George Edwin Bergstrom, David C. Allison, Myron Hunt, Elmer Grey, Sumner Hunt, Sumner Spaulding, and Pierpont Davis.

It was the centerpiece of the Los Angeles County justice system until it was damaged in the Northridge earthquake.

It was the home of Los Angeles County courts, the Los Angeles County Coroner, the Los Angeles County Sheriff's Office, and the Los Angeles County District Attorney's Office, and was for many years the primary Los Angeles County Jail.

The Beaux-Arts 1925 building was featured on television shows including Dragnet, Perry Mason and Get Smart. It was also featured in Visiting... with Huell Howser Episode 1014.

Notable residents of the Hall of Justice included Charles Manson, Sirhan Sirhan, Frances Farmer, Robert Mitchum and Shorty Rossi, star of the Animal Planet show Pit Boss, along with being the venue where the Supreme Court case Cohen v. California began, with the defendant wearing a coarse statement against the military draft on his blazer while walking its halls and being arrested for disturbing the peace. Autopsies performed at the Hall of Justice include those of actress Marilyn Monroe and the assassinated presidential candidate and former United States Attorney General Robert F. Kennedy. It was used as a filming location for the 1997 Clint Eastwood movie Absolute Power, as the Washington, D.C. police headquarters.

The Hall of Justice was shut down after January 1994 after sustaining damage because of the 1994 Northridge earthquake. In 2015, the building re-opened after undergoing a complete restoration and seismic retrofitting. The restoration and retrofit of the building was performed by the design build team consisting of Clark Construction, AC Martin Architects, and Englekirk Structural Engineers. The offices of the Los Angeles County Sheriff and the District Attorney returned to the building with its reopening.

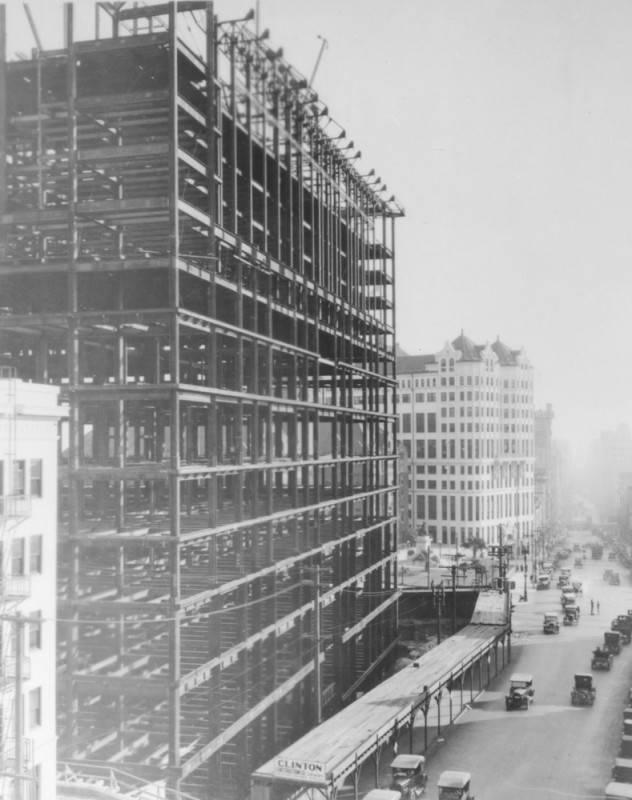
Construction of the Hall of Justice, 1924

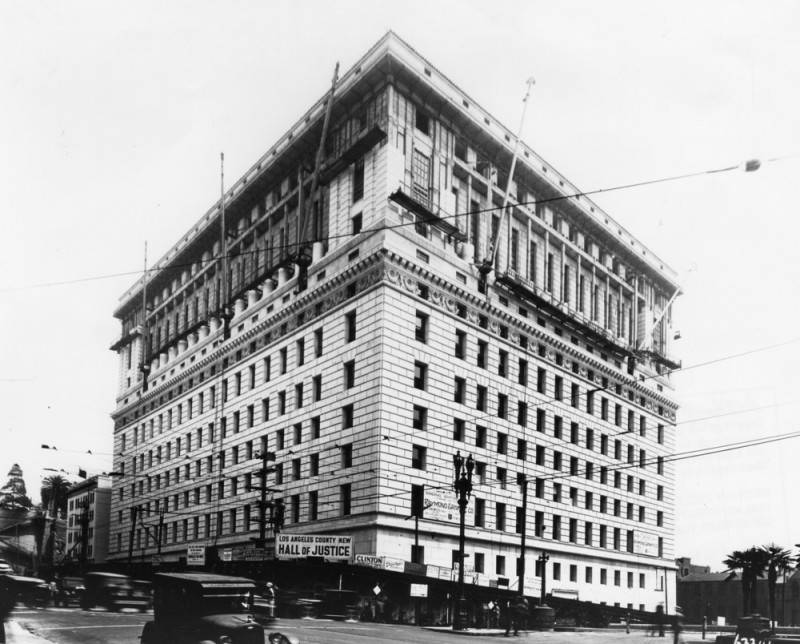
The building nearing completion

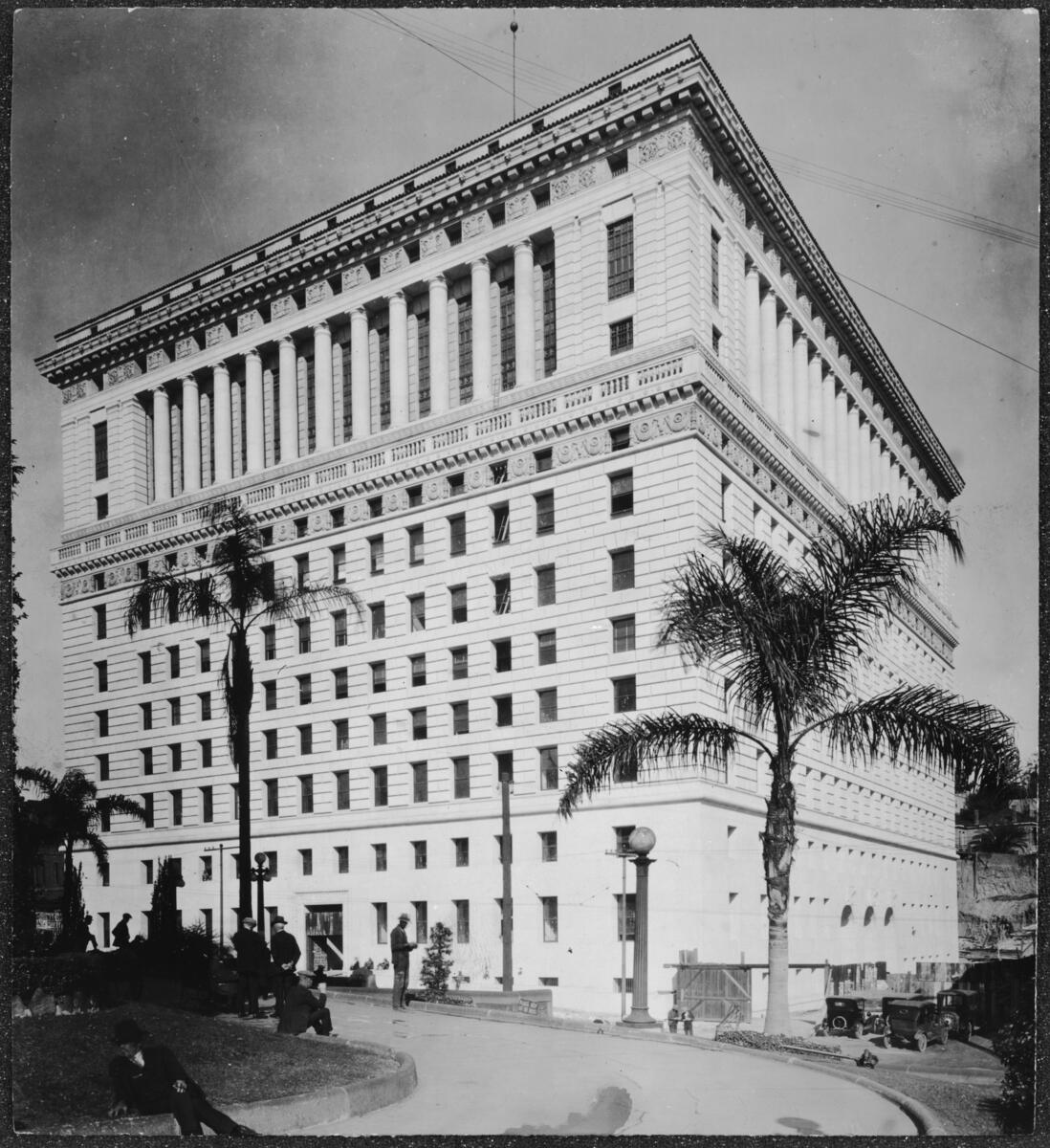
The building, c. 1928

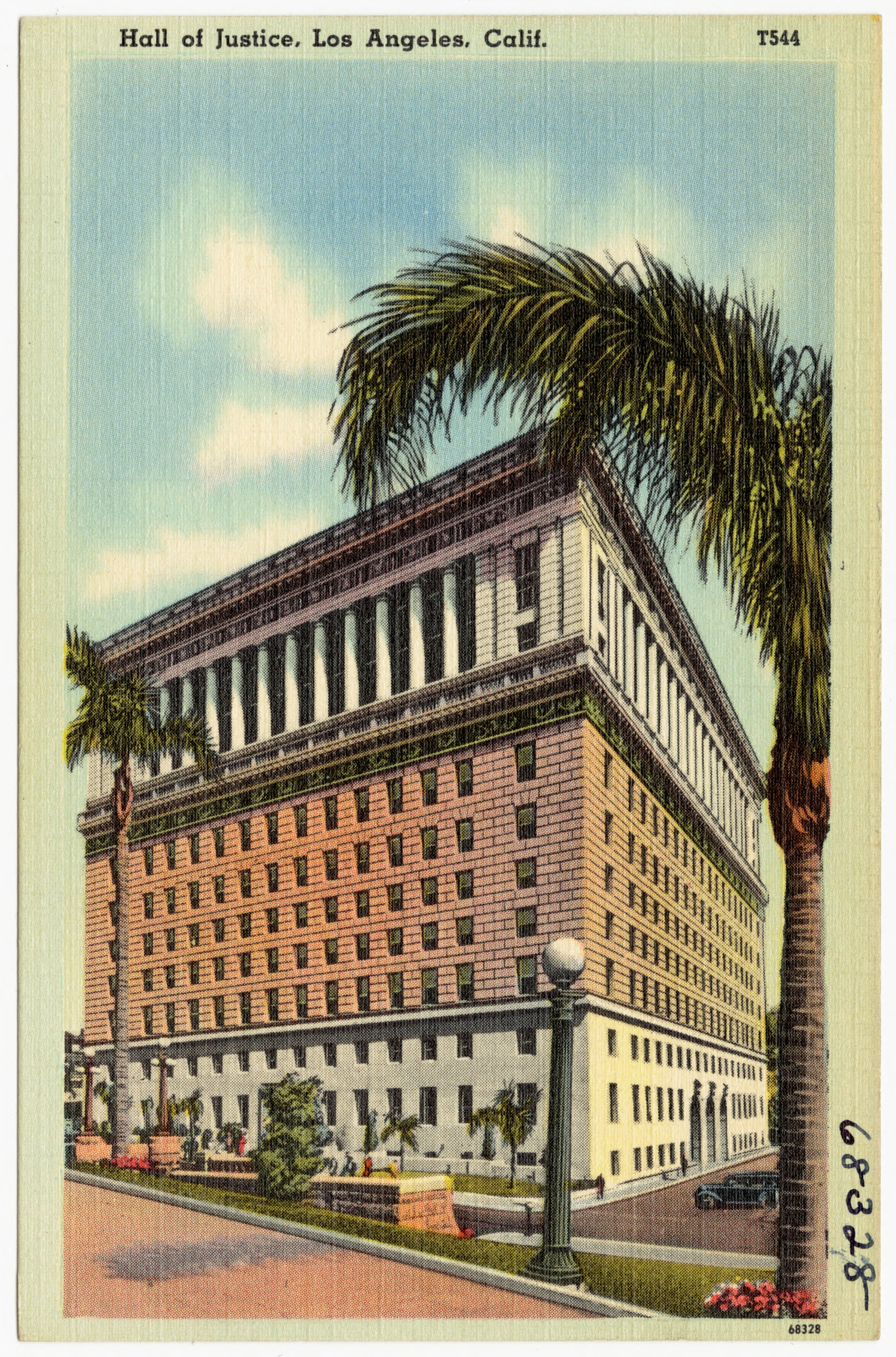
Postcard depicting the building, c. 1930-1945

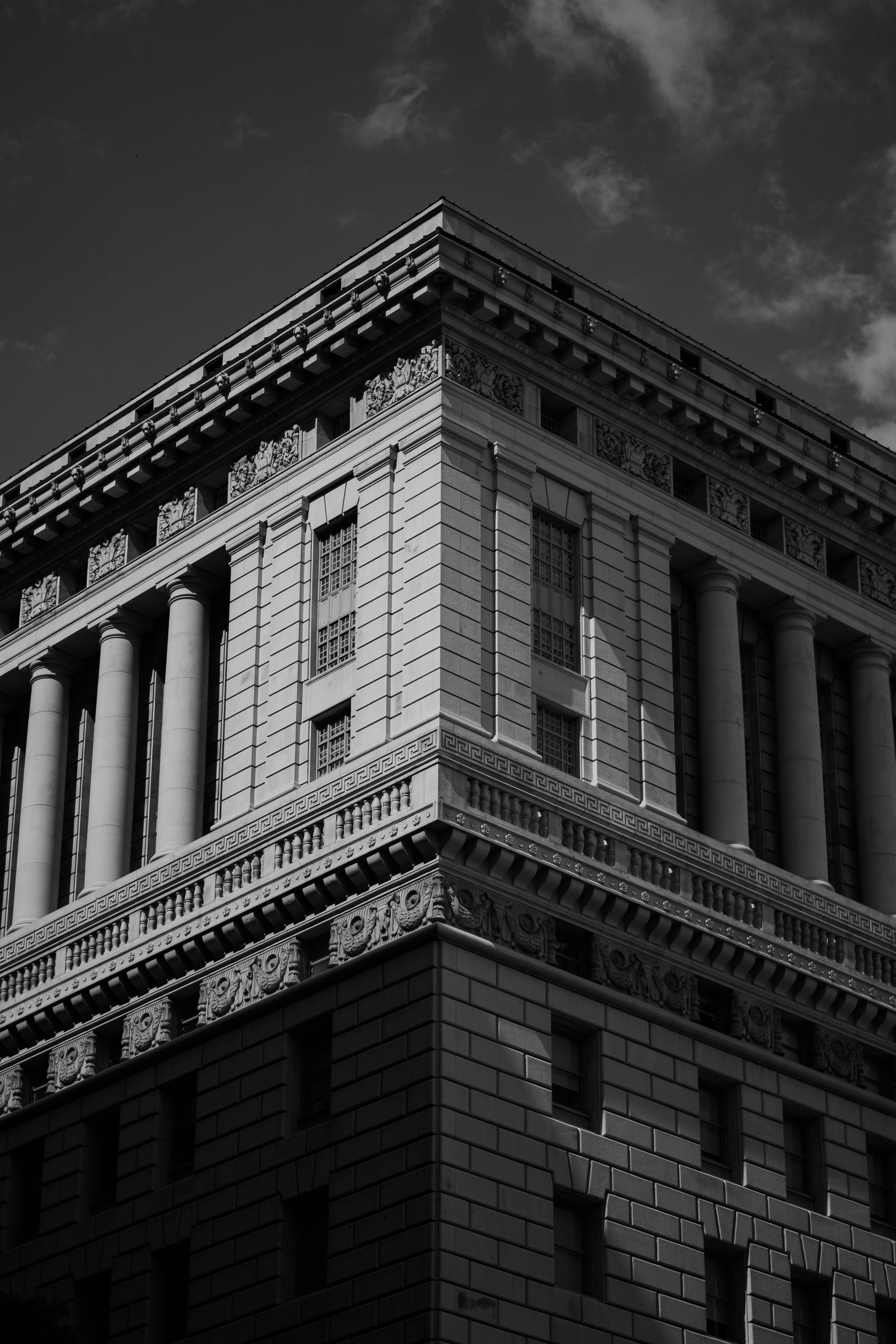
The building in 2020
