= Historic South Central Los Angeles =

Coordinates: 34.0249°N 118.2686°W

- Neighborhood of Los Angeles
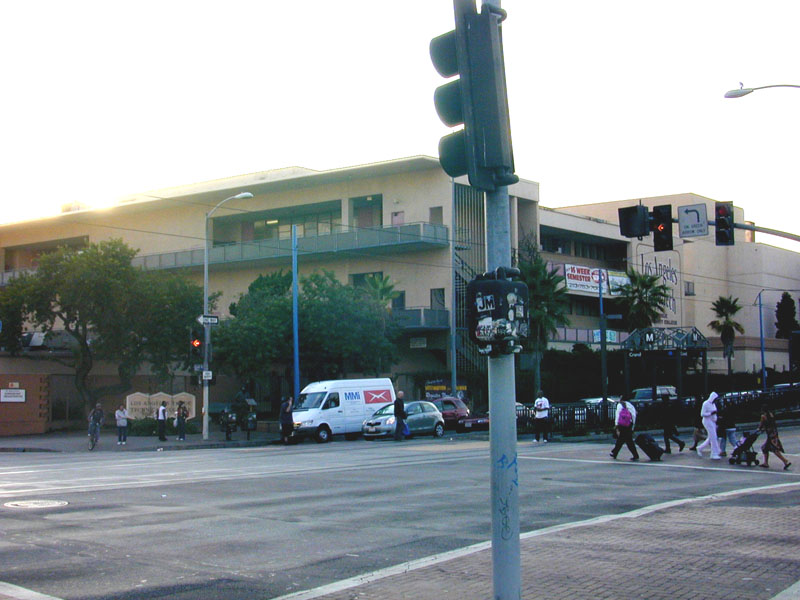
- Los Angeles Trade Technical College
- Interactive map of Historic South Central Los Angeles
- Country: United States
- State: California
- County: Los Angeles
- City: Los Angeles

Population
  - Total: 300,000
- Time zone: PST
  - Summer (DST): PDT

Historic South Central Los Angeles is a 2.25-square-mile neighborhood in Los Angeles, California, within the South Los Angeles region. It is the site of the Bob Hope Patriotic Hall.

From the late 1800s to early 1910s, African Americans began relocating to the area, mostly organizing around landholdings of Los Angeles pioneer Biddy Mason. The African American population continued to grow into the 1940s, and countless Jazz nightclubs lined South Central Avenue. In the 1990s, the neighborhood shifted to becoming a hub for Latino immigrants, with many being drawn by low rents and central City location. Also, the addition of the Metro Blue Line on the Washington Boulevard corridor has spurred growth, and a community plan recently adopted by the L.A. City Council hopes to revitalize the neighborhood.

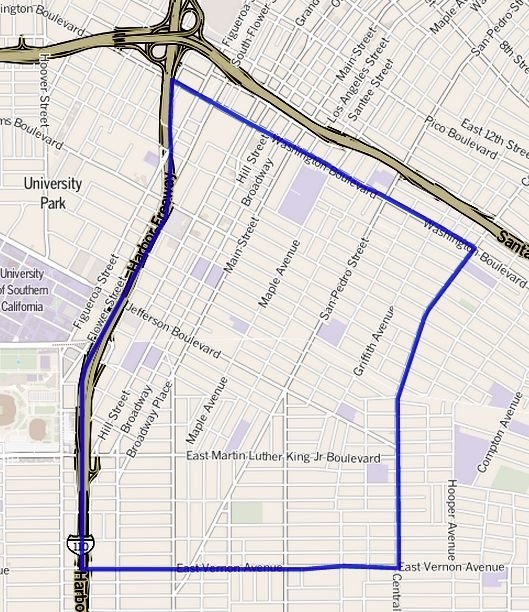
Historic South Central neighborhood of the city of Los Angeles, as drawn by the Los Angeles Times

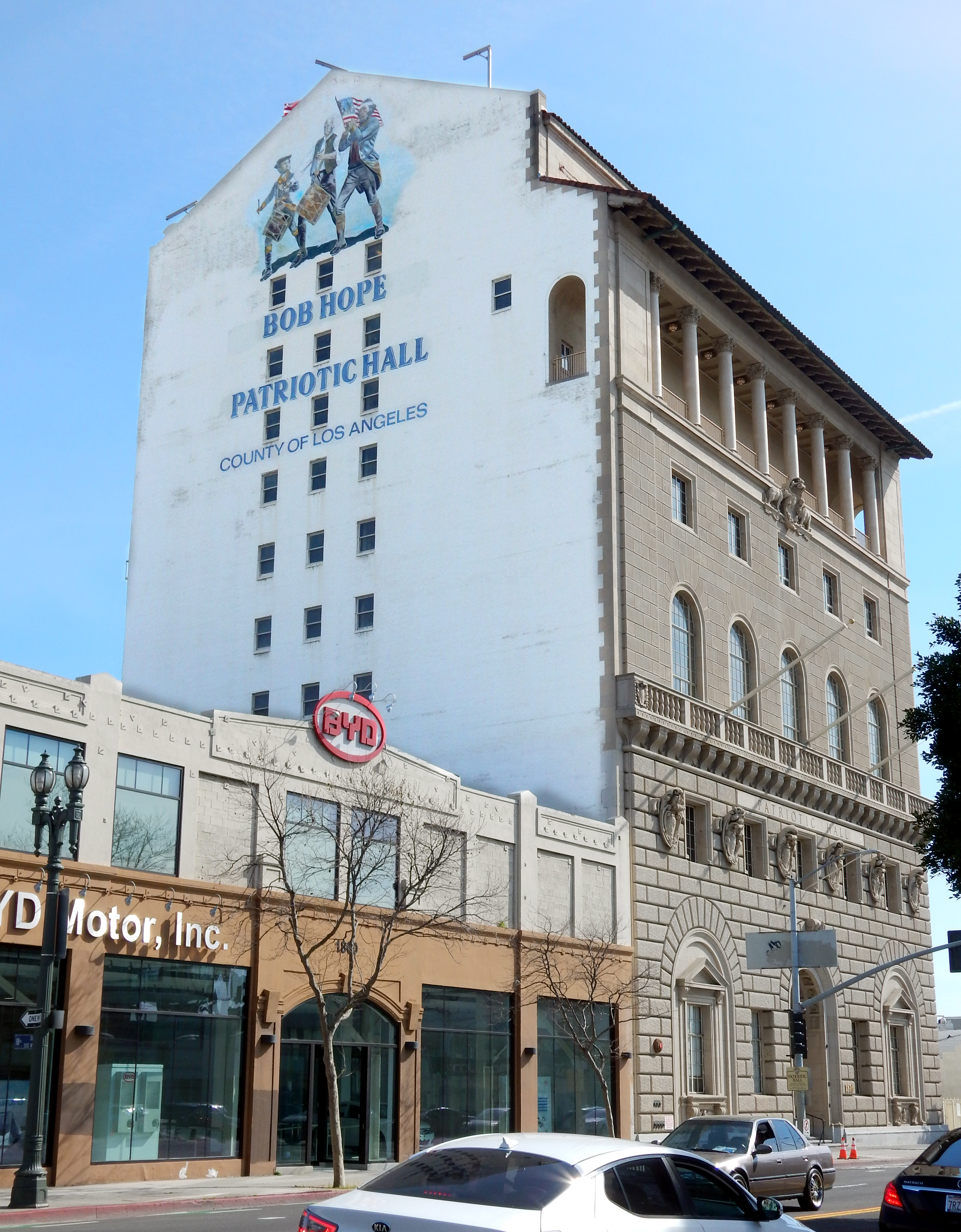
Bob Hope Patriotic Hall

== Geography ==
Historic South Central flanks Downtown Los Angeles on the northeast, Central-Alameda on the east, South Park on the south, and Vermont Square, Exposition Park and University Park on the west. It is bounded by Washington Boulevard on the north, Central Avenue on the east, East Vernon Avenue on the south and the Harbor Freeway on the west.

== Population ==
A total of 49,728 people lived in the Historic South Central neighborhood's 2.55 square miles, according to the 2000 U.S. census—averaging 19,474 people per square mile, among the highest population densities in both the city and the county. The median age was 23, considered young for the city and the county, and the percentages of residents aged birth through 34 was among the county's highest.

Within the neighborhood, Latinos made up 87.2% of the population, with black people at 10.1%, white people 1.8%; Asian 1.0% and other 0.6%. 56.3% of the neighborhood's residents were born abroad, with Mexico and El Salvador being the most common places of their birth. The percentage of the population born-abroad is considered a high when compared to the city or county as a whole.

The median household income in 2008 dollars was $30,882, considered low for both the city and county. The percentage of households earning $20,000 or less was high, compared to the county at large. The average household size of 4.1 people was above average. Renters occupied 79.6% of the housing units, and homeowners occupied the rest.

The percentages of never-married people were among the county's highest, and there were 2,290 families headed by single parents, or 24.9%, a rate that is considered high for the county and the city.

There were 769 veterans, or 2.5% of the population, considered low compared with the city and the county overall.

== Education ==
Historic South Central is second-highest on the list of Los Angeles city neighborhoods where adults over age 25 did not finish high school—74.2%. Residents of Historic South Central aged 25 and older holding a four-year degree amounted to 3.2% of the population, also considered low when compared with the city and the county as a whole.

Schools within the boundaries of the Historic South Central neighborhood are:

- Nava College Preparatory Academy, LAUSD, 1319 E 41st St, Los Angeles, CA,90011. Situated within Thomas Jefferson High School campus.
- Thomas Jefferson Senior High School, LAUSD, 1319 E 41st St, Los Angeles, CA 90011
- Los Angeles Trade–Technical College, Los Angeles Community College District, bounded by West Washington Boulevard, South Grand Avenue, West 23rd Street and South Flower Street
- Santee Education Complex, LAUSD high school, 1921 South Maple Avenue
- Animo Jackie Robinson Charter High School, situated within the LAUSD Clinton Middle School campus, 3500 South Hill Street
- Wallace Annenberg High School, LAUSD charter, 4000 South Main Street
- Frida Kahlo High School, LAUSD continuation, 1924 South Los Angeles Street
- Orthopaedic Hospital Medical Magnet High School, LAUSD alternative, 300 West 23rd Street
- John Adams Middle School, LAUSD, 151 West 30th Street
- Dr. Julian Nava Learning Academy, LAUSD, 1420 East Adams Boulevard
- Twenty-Eighth Street Elementary School, LAUSD, 2807 Stanford Avenue
- Maple Primary Center, LAUSD, 3601 South Maple Avenue
- Accelerated Elementary Charter, LAUSD charter, 119 East 37th Street
- Trinity Street Elementary, LAUSD, 3736 Trinity Street
- Synergy Charter Academy, LAUSD charter, 900 East 33rd Street
- Ricardo Lizarraga Elementary, LAUSD, 401 East 40th Place
- Wadsworth Avenue Elementary, LAUSD, 981 East 41st Street
- Harmony Elementary, LAUSD, 899 East 42nd Street
- West Vernon Avenue Elementary, LAUSD, 4312 South Grand Avenue
- Quincy Jones Elementary School, LAUSD, 900 East 33rd Street
- Nevin Avenue Elementary School, LAUSD,
- 1569 E 32nd Street
- Animo Ralph Bunche Charter High School

== Recreation and parks ==
- Trinity Recreation Center, 2415 Trinity Street
- Martin Luther King Jr. Mini-Park, MLK Jr. Boulevard between San Pedro Place and Avalon Boulevard
- Gilbert Lindsay Community Center, 425 E. 42nd Place
- Ross Snyder Recreation Center 1501 E. 41st Street

== Notable buildings ==
- Bob Hope Patriotic Hall, 1816 South Figueroa Street
- Mode O’Day Building
