= El Greco Apartments =

- U.S. National Register of Historic Places
- Los Angeles Historic-Cultural Monument
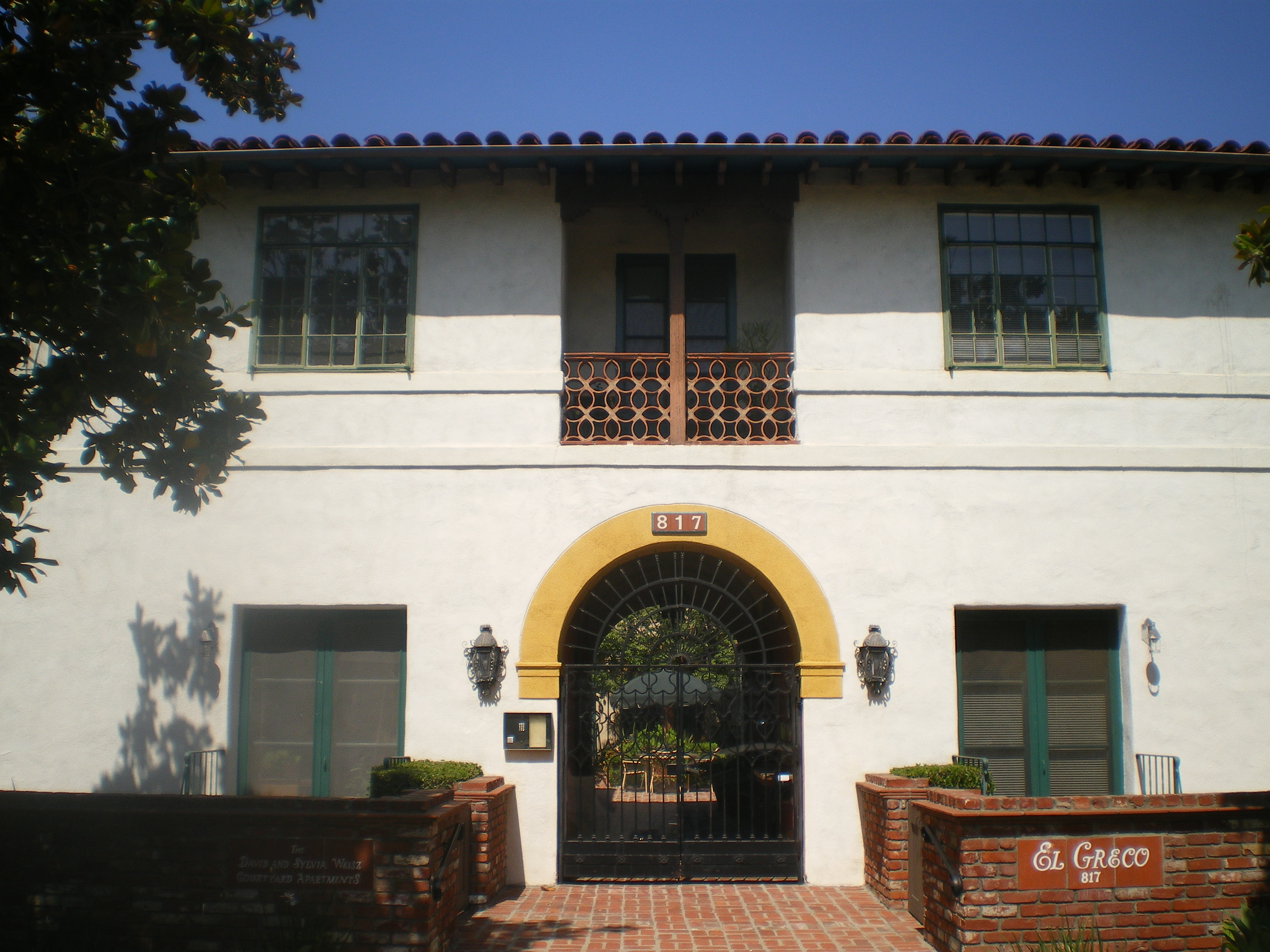
- El Greco Apartments, June 2008

- Location within the Los Angeles metropolitan area Location within California Location within the United States
- Location: 817 N. Hayworth Avenue, Los Angeles, California
- Coordinates: 34°5′11″N 118°21′44″W
- Built: 1929
- Architect: Davis & Davis
- Architectural style: Spanish Revival, Spanish Colonial Revival, Late 19th and 20th Century Revivals
- NRHP reference No.: 88002017
- LAHCM No.: 231

Significant dates
- Added to NRHP: November 03 1988
- Designated LAHCM: April 09 1981

El Greco Apartments is a historic twelve-unit, Spanish Revival style apartment building located in the Fairfax district of Los Angeles, California. The building was built in 1929 as one of the original buildings in the Westwood Village section of Los Angeles. Located in the heart of Westwood, the building was the home of film celebrities, including Erich von Stroheim, Michael Curtiz, and Joel McCrea. In the 1980s, the owner planned to demolish the building to erect a new condominium building. Met by tenant protests, the owner agreed to pay to have the building moved to another location. The building was ultimately moved to the Fairfax district where it was converted to low-income housing for senior citizens.

== Construction and architecture ==
The Spanish-Mediterranean style El Greco was built from 1929 to 1930 and was one of the original buildings in Westwood Village. The two-story, 12-unit structure was designed by architect Clara Bertram Humphrey, and modeled after the home of artist El Greco in Toledo, Spain. The structure is credited with having strongly influenced the architectural style of Westwood Village, with its elegant, Spanish-style buildings. The red tile roof and brick courtyard of the El Greco became a trend that was followed in many other structures in Westwood Village.

Once located in the heart of Westwood Village, the El Greco was the first hotel in Westwood Village and was reportedly the home to international film personalities, including Erich von Stroheim (Austrian director of the silent film classic Greed, among other works), Michael Curtiz (director of films such as The Adventures of Robin Hood, Angels with Dirty Faces, Casablanca, Yankee Doodle Dandy and White Christmas), and Joel McCrea (star of films including Alfred Hitchcock's Foreign Correspondent and Preston Sturges', Sullivan's Travels and The Palm Beach Story).

In April 1939, the El Greco was purchased by A.J. Dolan for $37,500.

== Preservation efforts ==
By the end of the 1970s, many of the old Spanish-Mediterranean style buildings in Westwood Village had been replaced with high-rises. Accordingly, controversy arose when the owner of the El Greco announced plans in 1979 to demolish the structure and replace it with condominiums. Tenants of the old building, who were served with 60-day notices to vacate, led the preservation effort. Tenants including Leonard Nimoy's son Adam Nimoy and James Davidson, with assistances from City Councilman Zev Yaroslavsky, led an effort to have the building declared a historic monument by the city's Cultural Heritage Board. In February 1980, the building was declared a Historic-Cultural Monument (#231), putting demolition plans on hold. Members of the Cultural Heritage Board referred to El Greco as "a stunning building ... that ought to be saved." And in October 1980, the Los Angeles City Council voted 10-0 to prevent demolition of the building.

With demolition halted, plans circulated to donate the building to the city for low-income housing, to relocate the structure to vacant land, or to sell the property to UCLA for use as affordable housing for young faculty members and their families. None of those plans was accepted, and in 1984, the owner again moved forward with efforts to demolish the building. On this occasion, a group known as Alternative Living for the Aging came forward with a plan to move the building to vacant land in the Beverly-Fairfax district, where it would be converted to low-income housing for senior citizens. The City Council voted to withhold permission for demolition to allow time for the group to raise funds for the relocation and refurbishment. The owner ultimately agreed to pay $55,000 for the cost of moving the building, and a combination of private and public funds totaling $600,000 was raised to pay for the cost of the land and refurbishment of the building. Among other efforts, Leonard Nimoy (Spock in the 1960s television series Star Trek) staged a fund-raiser for the effort to preserve the El Greco.

In September 1985, the El Greco was carefully carved into four pieces and hauled from its original site in Westwood to its new location in the Beverly-Fairfax district. Architect Peter de Bretteville, who was in charge of the move and refurbishment, noted:

"The difficult relocation was accomplished by dividing the apartment into four separate sections, preserving all of the structure's Spanish roof tiles and other elements of the charming brick and tile courtyard, including its central fish pond, which was recreated to its original appearance on the new site. The haul from Westwood required a great deal of preparation on the site, careful planning and finally settling of the structure on the new site. We worked within certain budget constraints and we tried to intrude as little as possible on the structure itself. I believe we came up with a good compromise."

When the old structure was removed, construction began on a new $7.5 million, 112-unit apartment complex on the original site.

== Current operation as alternative living for seniors ==
The relocated El Greco opened in December 1986 as housing for senior citizens. The building provides "alternative living" for seniors who do not need institutionalized care, but who choose not to live alone. Each resident is paired with another resident as "buddies" who check up on each other on a daily basis. Columnist Jack Smith profiled the novel facility in 1989, noting: "ALA screens every applicant for his or her compatibility degree. They must be clear-headed and without debilitating health problems. ... It doesn't hurt to be good at Scrabble and Trivial Pursuit."

In 1988, the original building was listed in the National Register of Historic Places.

== See also ==
- Los Angeles Historic-Cultural Monuments in Hollywood
- List of Registered Historic Places in Los Angeles
