= Swelldom =

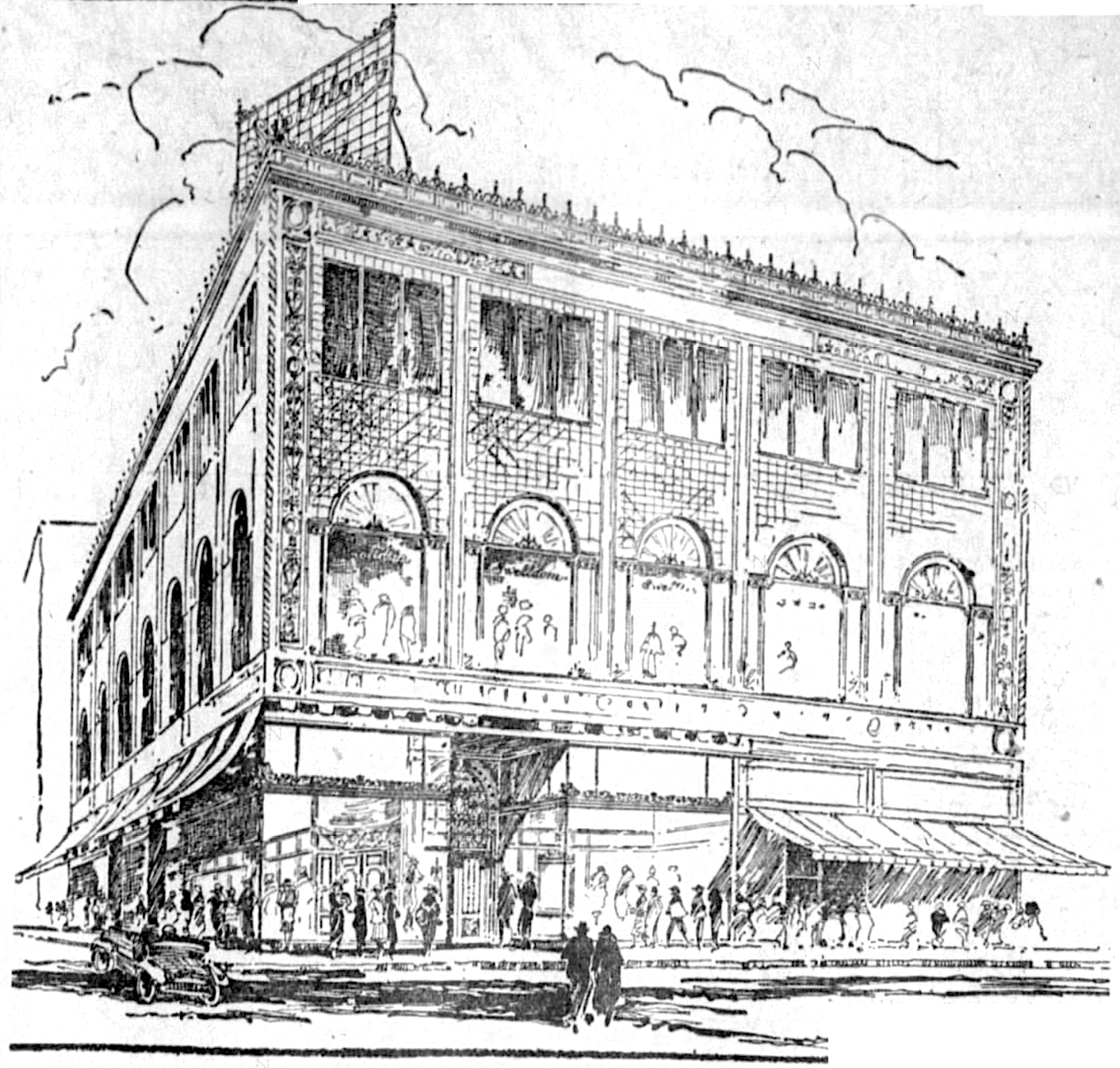
Sketch of 1925 renovation and expansion of Swelldom at NW corner of 6th & Broadway, downtown Los Angeles

Swelldom was a large women's clothing store, variously described as a "cloak and suit house" and a "department store", that operated in California from 1906 until the 1970s. It had locations on Broadway in downtown Los Angeles, on Wilshire Boulevard at Camden in Beverly Hills, and near Union Square in San Francisco.

== Los Angeles locations ==
Harry Goldberg opened Swelldom's first location as the Swelldom Cloak and Suit Shop in 1906 at 521 S. Broadway. In 1912, Swelldom secured a lease on 535 S. Broadway which it would occupy starting in 1914.

In November 1920, Swelldom moved into a new store at the northwest corner of Broadway and Sixth, which it promoted as "The New Swelldom Beautiful". This location was expanded and extensively renovated in 1925. In January 1946, Swelldom renovated the location again and promoted the "New Swelldom". With prominent men's specialty stores Silverwoods on the southeast corner and Mullen & Bluett on the northeast corner of this same intersection Swelldom advertised with the byline "The Women's Corner".

The building Swelldom occupied at 6th and Broadway is known as either Swelldom Building or Sun Drug Company Building, with Pierpont, Davis, and Withey as architects. In 1979, the building was listed as "Swelldom Building" in the National Register of Historic Places as a contributing property to the Broadway Theater and Commercial District.

== Beverly Hills location ==
Swelldom opened a location Wilshire Boulevard at Camden Drive in Beverly Hills on September 9, 1943. With Saks Fifth Avenue having opened in the same area in 1930, this section of Beverly Hills taken over from Hollywood Boulevard as the area's main suburban upscale fashion district, rivaling Seventh Street downtown.

== San Francisco location ==
In 1908, Swelldom opened a temporary store on Fillmore Street in San Francisco, and on May 17, 1909 a Swelldom opened an elaborate, complete store on 136–144 Grant Avenue near Union Square. Swelldom positioned itself as offering "high-grade, exclusive apparel at moderate prices" at the time.
