= La Venta Inn =

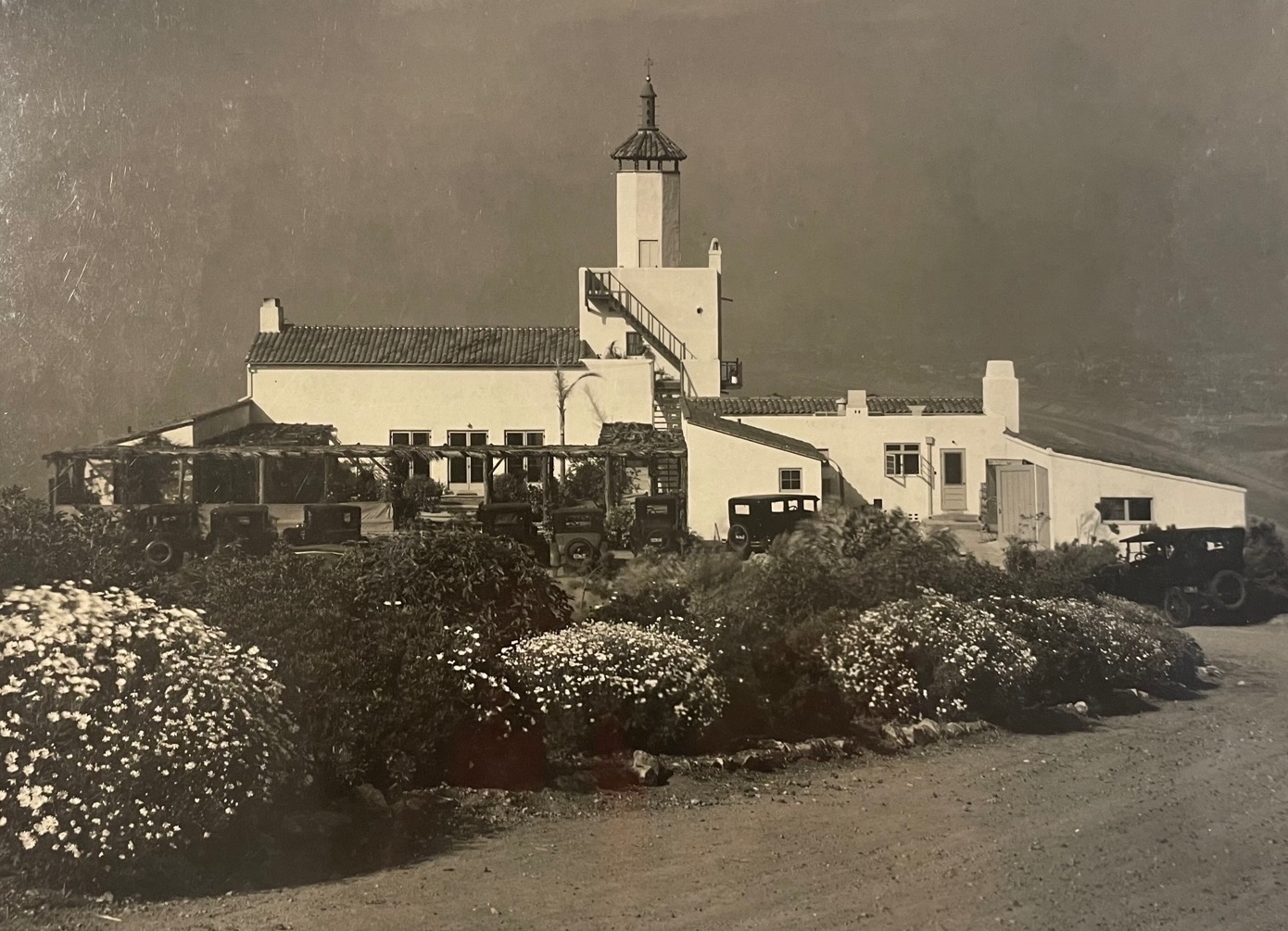
- The building in 1927
- Interactive map of the La Venta Inn area
- Former names: Clubhouse 764, La Venta

General information
- Architectural style: Spanish Colonial
- Location: 796 Via Del Monte, Palos Verdes Estates
- Coordinates: 33.795065°N 118.400225°W
- Completed: 1923
- Owner: Schnetzler Descendents

Technical details
- Size: 3 acre lot

Design and construction
- Architect: Walter Davis, Piermont Davis
- Architecture firm: Davis & Davis
- Other designers: Fredrick Law Olmsted
- Awards and prizes: Dedicated as a Historical Landmark on Nov. 11, 1978; California Historic Resource, 1990

The La Venta Inn is a historical landmark property located in Palos Verdes Estates, California, United States.

Constructed in 1923 by the direction of Frank A. Vanderlip and the Palos Verdes Project, the La Venta Inn was originally called "Clubhouse 764" and was used as a sales office. The historic structure was the first building erected in city of Palos Verdes Estates and among the first to be built on the entire Palos Verdes Peninsula. The property is significant for its role in developing the peninsula, hosting elite guests from around the world, and becoming a landmark location for weddings in Southern California.

== History ==
"La Venta" or "The Sale" was used by Frank A. Vanderlip and his business associates under the land syndicate business, "The Palos Verdes Project" in order to entertain realtors and property investors in 1923.

Architect brothers Pierpont and Walter Swindell Davis designed the Spanish-style building, with renowned landscape architectural firm the Olmsted Brothers laying out its grounds. Authorized by Permit #4, This was the first property built by the Palos Verdes Project. The location of the property was chosen for the northern view which showed half land, half Pacific Ocean. The view follows the city of Redondo Beach and up the Santa Monica Bay coastline.

After financial difficulties early on due to fraudulent activities of E.G. Lewis, Vanderlip took back control of the project in 1924. The use of the property was transitioned into a small inn with immediate success. It could only accommodate six overnight rooms at a time, but built a reputation for elegance and fine dining.

Social events such as proms, galas, and weddings were held at La Venta Inn and it soon became a prominent gathering place for the Palos Verdes community. The first wedding at La Venta took place in May 1924.

Filmmakers used the location for the first time for the silent film, The Girl From Montmartre, starring Lewis Stone and Barbara La Marr. Based on the novel Spanish Sunlight by Anthony Pryde, it was filmed at the Inn in 1925 and released in early 1926.

During the 1920s and 1930s, a long list of celebrities and movie stars stayed at the Inn. Due to its privacy and remote location, Hollywood elite saw the location as an ideal getaway. Visitors included aviator Charles Lindbergh, violinist Jascha Heifetz, and movie stars Greta Garbo, Tyrone Power, Cary Grant, Gloria Swanson, Myrna Loy, Errol Flynn, Betty Grable, Margaret Sullavan, Charlie Chaplin, Janet Gaynor and Bob Hope.

The Inn became part of Palos Verdes Estates when that city voted to incorporate in 1939.

The Inn's location was used for military defense purposes during WWII. On Christmas Day, 1941, eighteen days after the Dec. 7 Pearl Harbor attack, a lookout stationed in La Venta's cupola tower reported seeing a periscope offshore. This sighting became national news as the country was on high alert for Japanese attacks.

A Japanese submarine had torpedoed the lumber-carrying freighter Absaroka on Dec. 24th, and the artillery battery at Fort MacArthur opened fire just as some residents were sitting down to Christmas dinner, leading them to think they were under attack.

No trace of the Japanese sub was found. The periscope apparently was a black chimney that had blown off a ship during a recent storm.

== Ownership and Operation ==
Jay Lawyer, the first owner of La Venta after the Palos Verdes Project, sold the property in 1941 to Broadway actor Frank Conroy after the Depression muted the Peninsula real estate boom he had anticipated. World War II hurt the Inn business due to gas rationing restrictions, and Conroy eventually closed the Inn to the public before selling the Inn to Stanley and Margaret Schnetzler in 1944. The Schnetzlers used it as their private residence until 1952 when she hosted private events at the property. La Venta officially reopened the property for private events only in 1954 with Margaret involved in the day-to-day activities. At this time, rooms were no longer available to rent.

According to Ken Dyda, a founder of the Rancho de los Palos Verdes Historical Society, "the inn was designated a historical site in 1978 by the society not long after" the society was founded."

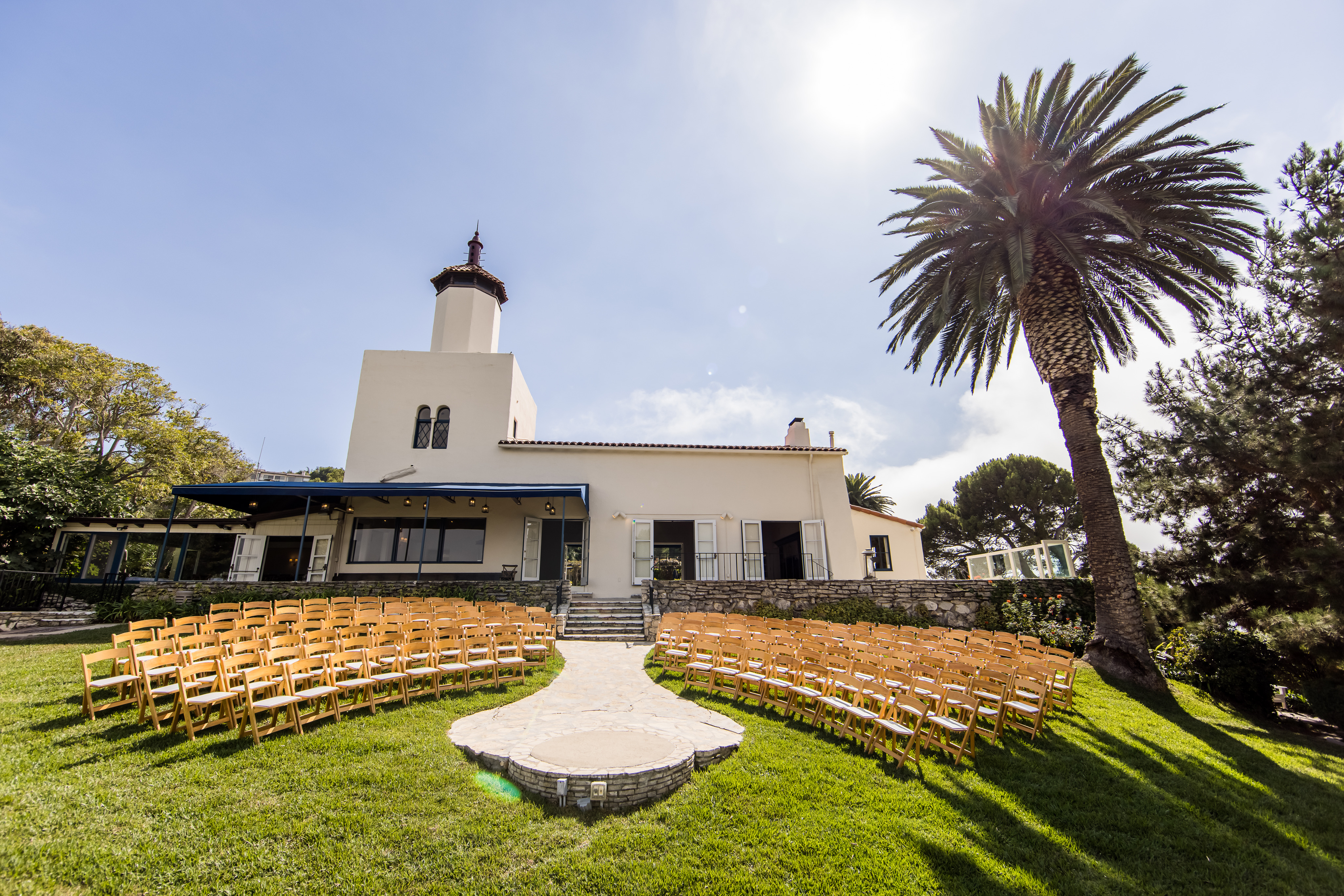
La Venta Inn on the Ceremony Lawn

The Schentzler family descendants still own the property to this day. In 1966, the Schentzlers leased the operation of the property to William Eskridge and his family, who ran it for 26 years. In 1990, the La Venta Inn was designated a California Historic Resource by the state Office of Historic Preservation.
