= Mode O'Day Building =

155 West Washington Boulevard
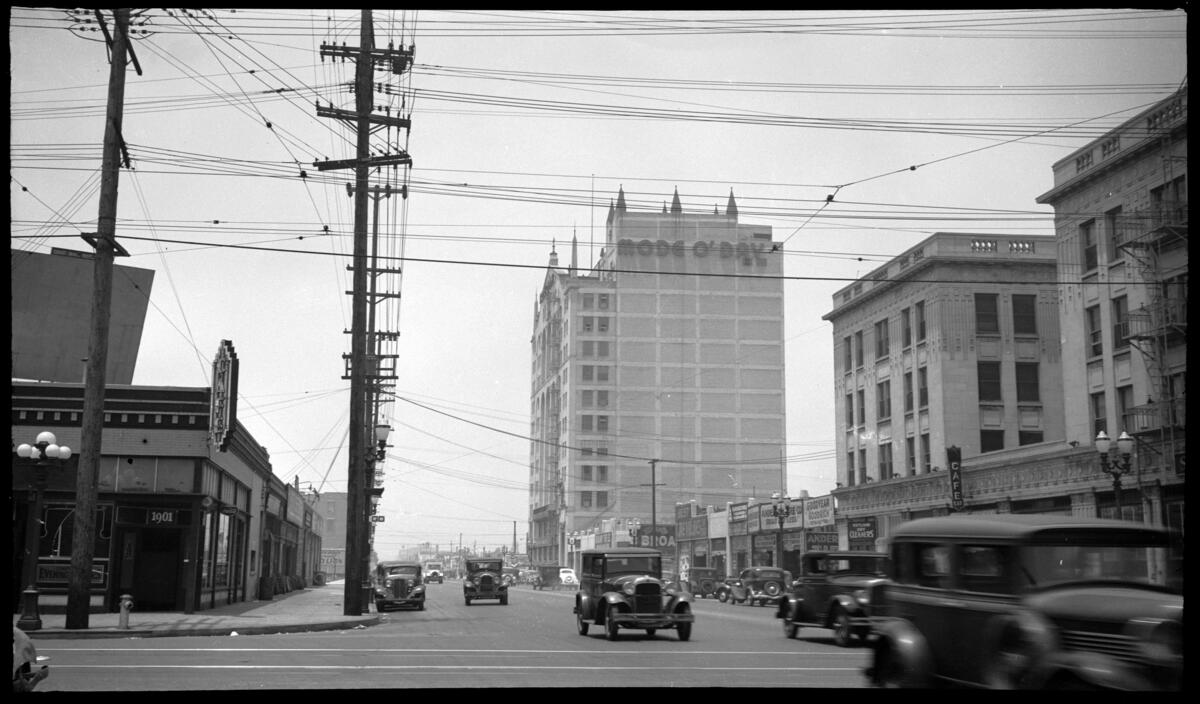
- Photo taken between 1930 and 1939

- Location within the Los Angeles metropolitan area Location within California Location within the United States
- Former names: Mode O'Day Building; County Assessors Building

General information
- Status: Completed
- Type: High-rise
- Architectural style: Romanesque Revival
- Location: Historic South Central Los Angeles, 151-161 West Washington Boulevard; 1840-1850 South Hill Street, Los Angeles, United States
- Coordinates: 34°01′56″N 118°15′58″W
- Completed: 1927

Height
- Height: 185.56 feet (56.56 m)

Technical details
- Floor count: 12

The Mode O'Day Building is a Renaissance Revival high-rise building built in 1927. It is located in Los Angeles, in the Washington and Hill neighborhood.

According to the Los Angeles Historic Resources Inventory, the primary address is 1836 S Hill Street, while alternate addresses include 1840 S Hill St., 1842 S Hill St., 157 W Washington Blvd., 155 W Washington Blvd., and 1838 S Hill St.. It was built on the former site of the Prager Park showgrounds.

As a historical building, it is a useful example of an industrial loft, a tall building built to maximize floor space given a limited land area. It has "regular bays of industrial sash windows". From 1927 up to today (as of 2015) it has been in continuous operation as a garment factory. Mode O'Day produced women's clothing at moderate prices, selling from its own retail stores located in the Western United States, often in small towns.

It has a flat asphalt roof and glazed double doors. It is clad in smooth stucco, and pilasters have been applied to the walls. It is 12 stories tall and features six conical spires on its roof.
