= Allied Architects Association =

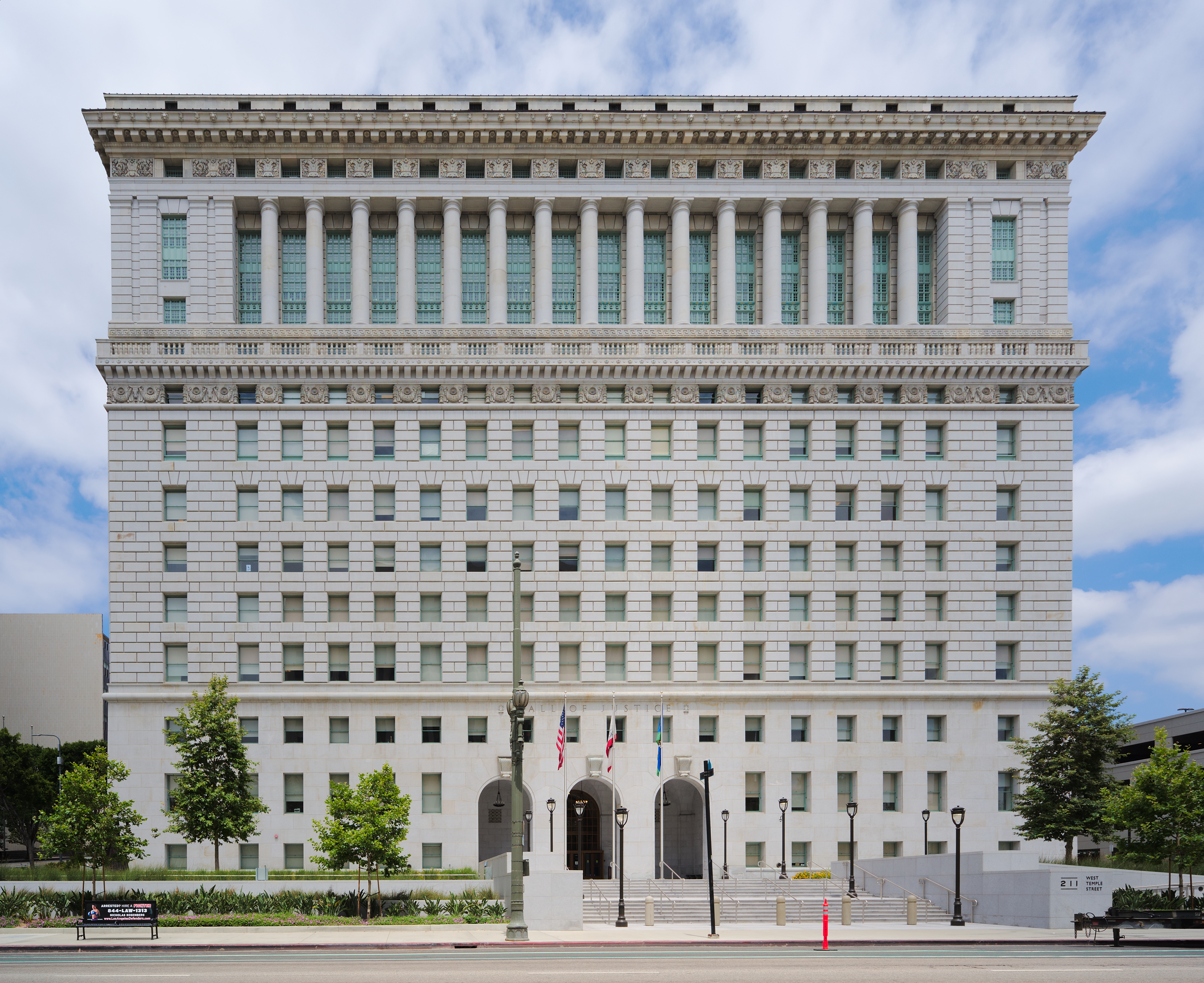
Hall of Justice (Los Angeles)

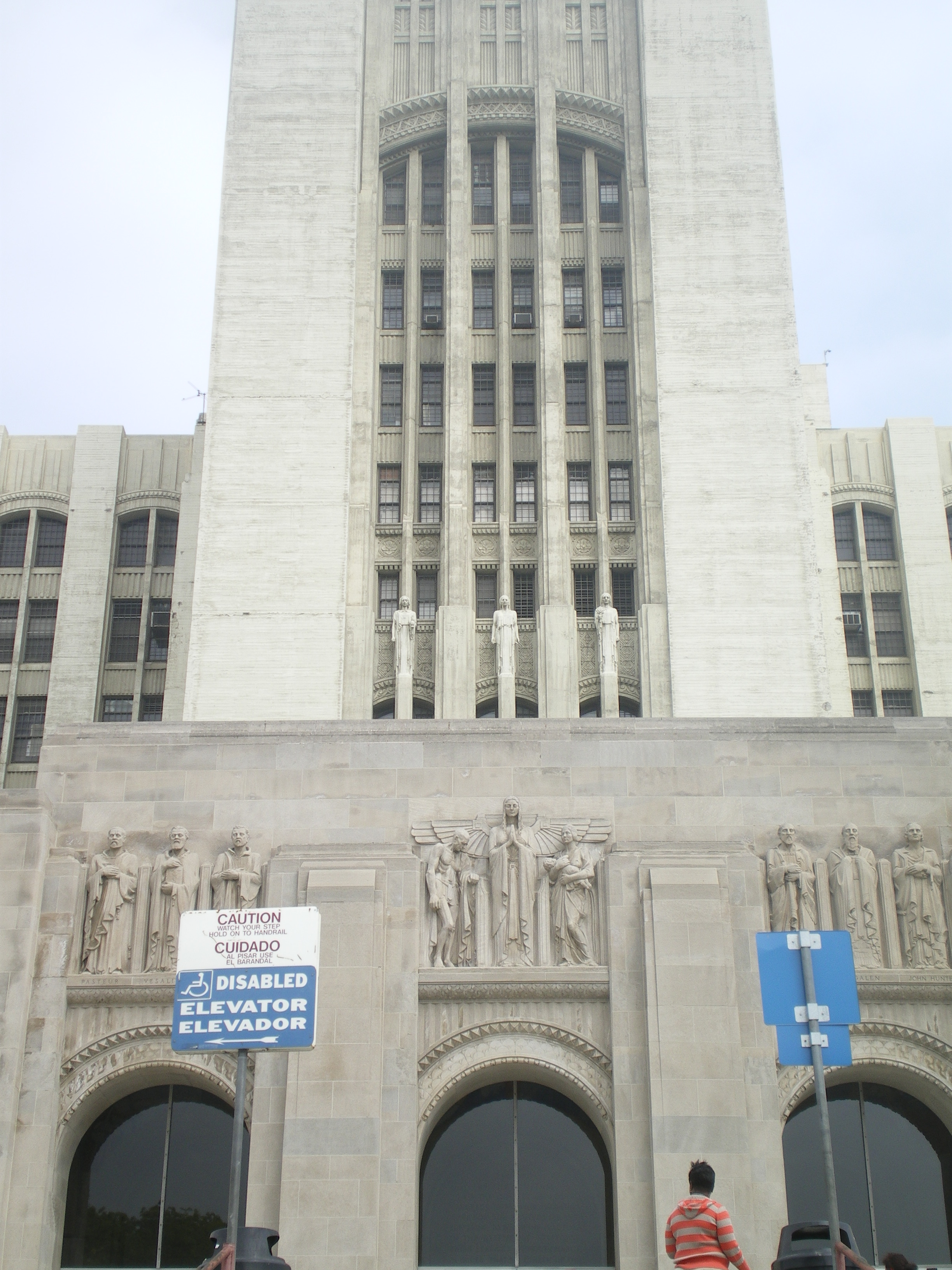
Front entrance of the Los Angeles County—USC Medical Center

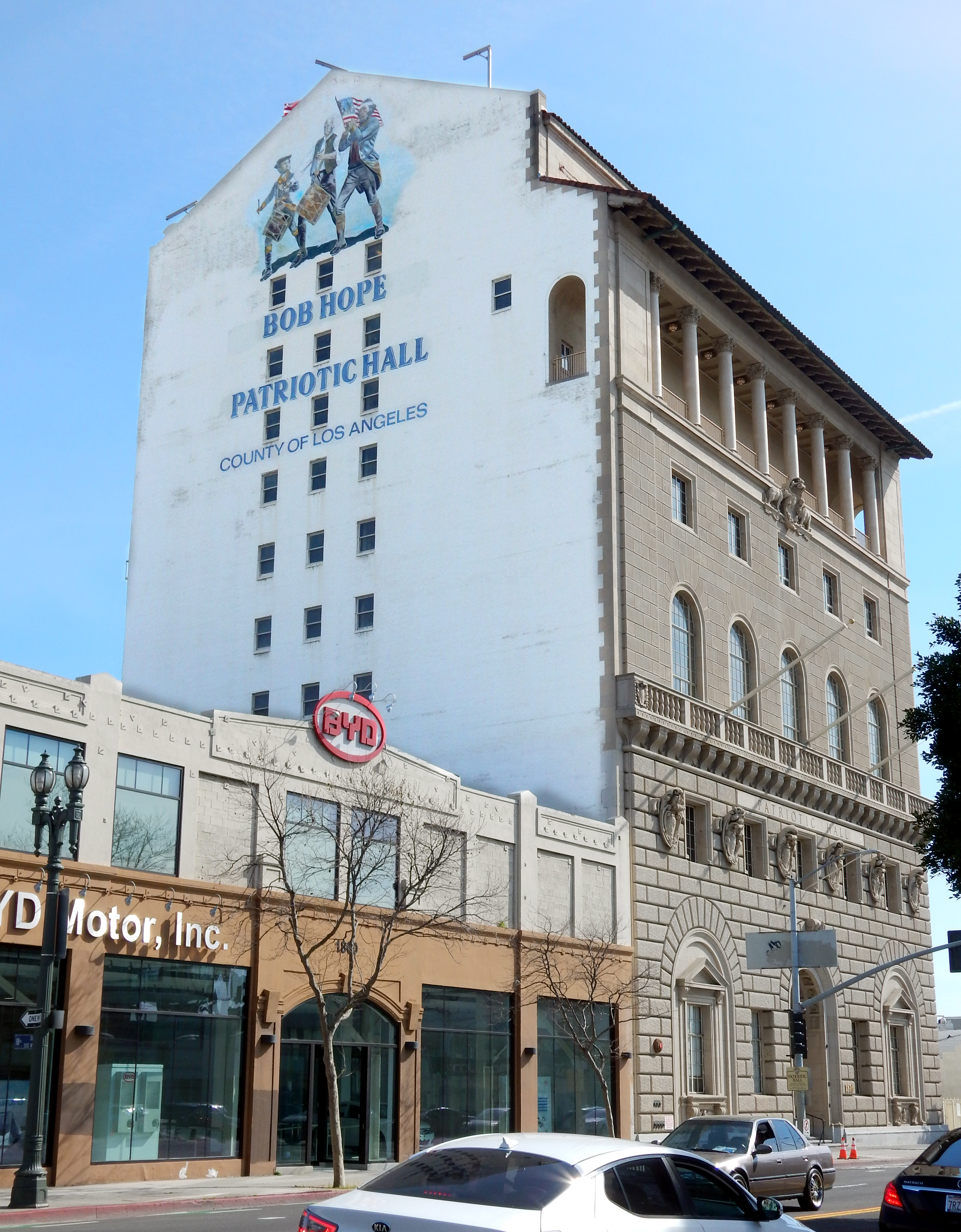
Bob Hope Patriotic Hall, 1816 S. Figueroa St., South Park, Los Angeles

Allied Architects Association was a coalition of Los Angeles-based architects founded in 1921 to design public buildings. Participating architects included Octavius Morgan, Reginald Davis Johnson, George Edwin Bergstrom, David C. Allison, Myron Hunt, Elmer Grey, Sumner Hunt, Sumner Spaulding, and Pierpont Davis.

Works include:

- The Hall of Justice (Los Angeles), 211 W. Temple St. at Broadway, Civic Center, Los Angeles, 1925, Beaux-Arts
- Bob Hope Patriotic Hall, 1816 S. Figueroa St., South Park, Los Angeles, a 10-story building that was dedicated as Patriotic Hall by the Los Angeles Board of Supervisors in 1925 and was built to serve veterans of Indian Wars, Spanish–American War, World War I and to support the Grand Army of the Republic. It serves as the home of the Los Angeles County Department of Military and Veterans Affairs. Patriotic hall was rededicated to honor of Bob Hope and renamed "Bob Hope Patriotic Hall" on November 12, 2004.
- Los Angeles County—USC Medical Center, 1200 State Street, Boyle Heights, Los Angeles, 1933, Art Deco, nickname "the Great Stone Mother" and had 800 patient beds.
