= 1932 Olympics =

The 1932 Olympics may refer to:

- The 1932 Winter Olympics, which were held in Lake Placid, United States
- The 1932 Summer Olympics, which were held in Los Angeles, United States
