= Bob Hope Patriotic Hall =

Historic building in Los Angeles, California

The Bob Hope Patriotic Hall
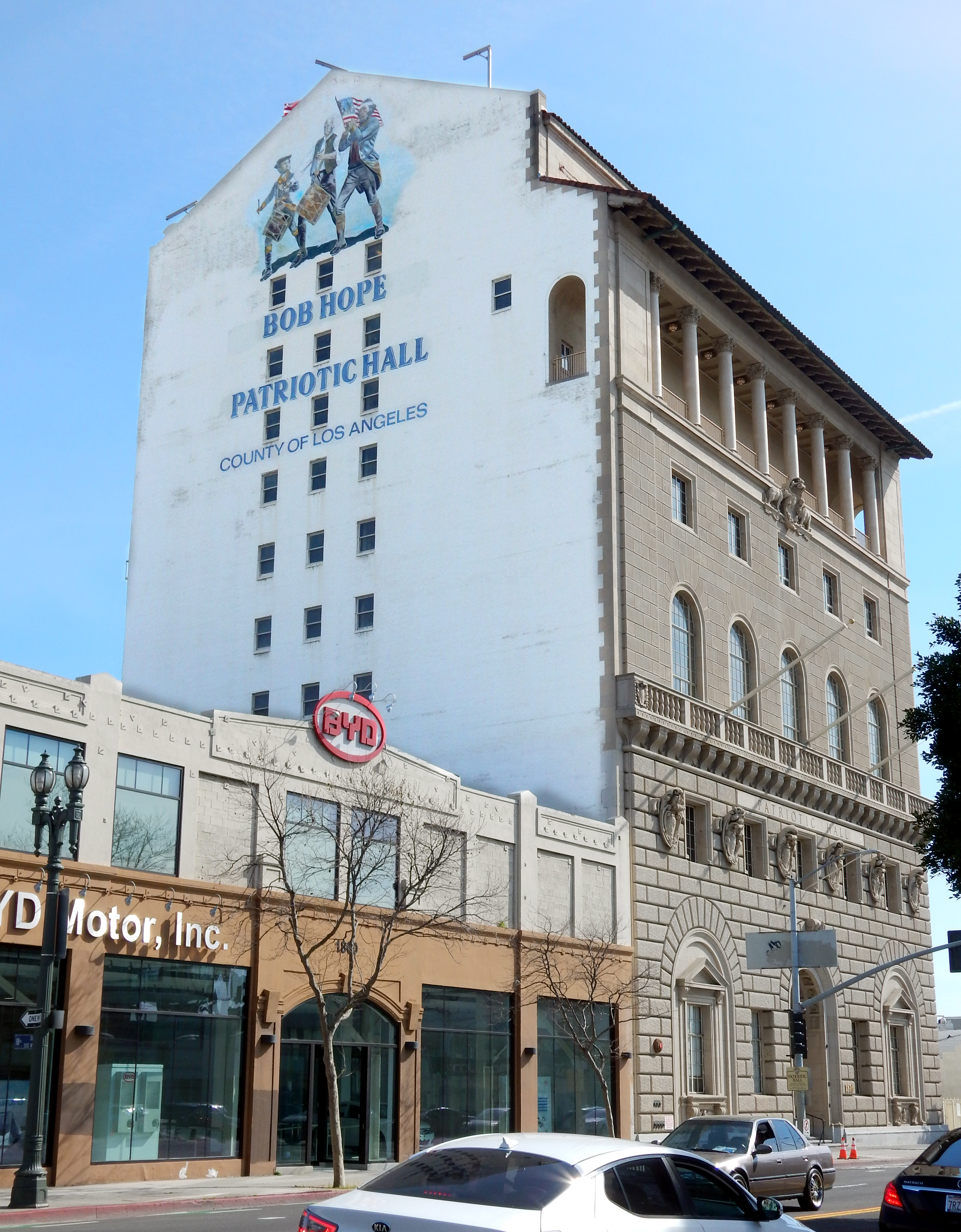
- The north side of Bob Hope Patriotic Hall, featuring its Spirit of '76 mural, as seen looking southbound on S. Figueroa Street.

General information
- Architectural style: Romanesque architecture
- Location: Los Angeles County, 1816 S. Figueroa Street; Los Angeles, 90015, United States of America
- Coordinates: 34.0352°N 118.271°W
- Current tenants: home of the Los Angeles County Department of Military and Veterans Affairs
- Named for: Bob Hope
- Construction started: 1925
- Opened: 1926
- Renovated: 2006
- Owner: County of Los Angeles

Technical details
- Floor count: 10

Design and construction
- Architecture firm: Allied Architects Association
- Awards: Certificate of Honor, Southern California Chapter of the American Institute of Architects.

Website
- mva.lacounty.gov/bhph/

Bob Hope Patriotic Hall is a 10-story building that was dedicated as Patriotic Hall by the Los Angeles Board of Supervisors in 1925 and was built to serve veterans of Indian Wars, Spanish–American War, World War I and to support the Grand Army of the Republic. It serves as the home of the Los Angeles County Department of Military and Veterans Affairs. Patriotic Hall was rededicated to honor Bob Hope and renamed "Bob Hope Patriotic Hall" on November 12, 2004.

== History ==
Patriotic Hall was built, on land deeded by Civil War veterans, in 1925 and the building opened its doors in 1926 to serve the public. When it was built, the 85,000-square-foot (7,900 m^{2}) building was the tallest building in the city of Los Angeles, "at the equivalent of twelve stories", for seven years.

=== Design ===
The building was designed by Allied Architects Association (33 prominent architects in Los Angeles) using Romanesque features. The lobby was designed with vaulted arch construction and contains murals on the walls. A three panel mural created by A.J. Leitner called Soldiers and Sailors occupies one of the vestibules of the building. Created as part of the Works Progress Administration, the murals depict uniformed U.S. military personnel from 1776 to 1941. A series of lobby murals completed by Helen Lundeberg as part of the Works Progress Administration were removed in the 1970s, and are now considered missing. In 2013, muralist Kent Twitchell unveiled We the People, Out of Many, One, a series of murals which occupies the site of Lundeberg's original work. Twitchell's murals pay homage to Lundeberg's design, while depicting real life veterans and other people associated with the military.

=== Awards ===
A Certificate of Honor has been awarded to the building for its exceptional merit by the Southern California Chapter of the American Institute of Architects, and it was placed on the State’s Register of Historical Resources on 27 February 1976. The building was built on land deeded by Civil War veterans. It was added to the National Register of Historic Places in 2025.

=== Other notable events ===
Arianna Huffington hosted a Shadow convention in Patriotic Hall while the 2000 Democratic National Convention took place in Staples Center.

== Refurbishment ==
In 2006, the building was temporarily closed so that it could be renovated. The renovations included:

- Updated mechanical systems
- ADA upgrades, including new parking stalls
- Updated meeting, conference and office spaces
- Refurbished gym
- 500-seat auditorium
- Full-service kitchen

The renovated Patriotic Hall was completed in 2013 at a cost of $46 million.

In more active years, Patriotic Hall was the headquarters and/or a mailing address for hundreds of organizations. Once renovation was completed, the original veteran service organizations were invited back into the building, this includes:

- American Legion Post 8
- World War II Veterans Groups
- County offices such as the Department of Military and Veterans Affairs, which returned to the building on August 26, 2013 under its new director, Brig. Gen. Ruth A. Wong.

== Ownership and management ==
Bob Hope Patriotic Hall is owned by the County of Los Angeles. Operations are managed by the Department of Military and Veterans Affairs.

== Current purpose ==
The hall is the home to military artifacts and memorabilia. It houses documents from wars and conflicts starting with the American Revolutionary War, and including recent Middle East conflicts. Additionally, multiple veteran organizations hold tenancy in the building and offer a range of services including free mental health support, case management services, employment assistance, benefits and service connection assistance, women veteran specific programming, and veteran peer access support. Patriotic Hall is meant to be a service center, therefore walk-ins are welcome.

At the rededication ceremonies in 2013, American Legion member and past California Department Commander Hugh Crooks Jr expressed appreciation that the building was being rededicated back to the veterans: “This is not just for past veterans. It is also for future vets. All future vets will know that this building in Los Angeles County is their building. That’s what it’s here for. That’s what it will always be for.”

== Location ==
The building is less than a mile from Staples Center and LA Live. It is visible from both interstate 10 (Santa Monica Freeway) and State Route 110 (Harbor Freeway). The structure is located at 1816 S. Figueroa Street, Los Angeles, California, 90015. Figueroa Street was a part of the old US Highway 6. It is west from Historic South Central neighborhood. It is only one block from the Metro A Line train station at Los Angeles Trade-Technical College.

== Collections ==
There are many artifacts stored in the hall. They have been documented and cataloged. The estimated worth of the collection is valued at more than $1 million.

Included are:

- Uniforms from Winston Churchill, General George Patton, General Norman Schwarzkopf.
- Historic flags
- Historic weapons
- Original oil paintings by naval artist Arthur Beaumont.

Much of the collection is property of American Legion Post 8. Display cases hold these valuable artifacts.
