= Orthopaedic Hospital Medical Magnet High School =

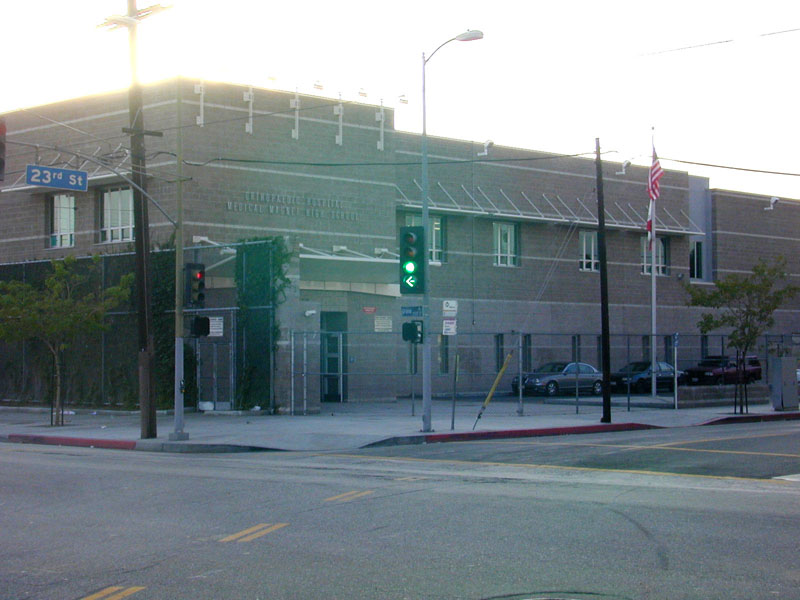

Location
- 300 W 23rd Street; Los Angeles, California 90007; United States; 34°01′42.5″N 118°16′17.1″W

Information
- Other names: Orthopaedic Hospital Medical Magnet, Ortho High School
- Type: Magnet, Public
- Mottoes: Learning Today...Leading Tomorrow. Viper Pride! and...Where everyone knows your name.
- Established: September 9, 2004
- School district: LAUSD
- Principal: Gustavo Barrientos
- Grades: 9–12
- Gender: Coeducational
- Enrollment: 828
- Student to teacher ratio: 23:1
- Schedule type: Block schedule
- Campus type: Urban
- Colors: Navy Blue and Gold
- Mascot: Viper
- USNWR ranking: 90th (California)
- National ranking: 647th
- Website: Official Website

Orthopaedic Hospital Medical Magnet High School (also known as OHMMHS, Orthopaedic Hospital Medical Magnet, Orthopaedic High School, or Ortho High School) is an alternate magnet high school located in the Historic South Central neighborhood in Los Angeles, California. The school is located near the Los Angeles Orthopedic Hospital on the property donated by the hospital. The school houses approximately 800 students.

== Facilities ==
OHMMHS has two two-story buildings that make up the school about 250 feet apart from each other. Covered canopies, a lunch shelter, basketball and volleyball courts are located in between the buildings. The school includes a student store, a multipurpose room, a cafeteria, a school library, a bookstore, a weight training room and 32 classrooms in total. The property was given by the Los Angeles Orthopedic Hospital and was constructed by Hensel Phelps Construction. The building was designed by architect Rebecca L. Binder in 2003.

== History ==
In 2003, LAUSD commissioned Hensel Phelps Construction to build the school on the property given by the Los Angeles Orthopedic Hospital. Hensel Phelps provided $41 million in construction financing for the new project, with the building was completed in June 2004 after 13 months of construction, and was sold back to LAUSD. The school opened in September, being the first of seven new schools opening in the Downtown area and was the first school constructed in the district since Francisco Bravo Medical Magnet in 1990. The school helped relieve overcrowding at the nearby Jefferson High School, with about half of the students attending OHMMHS living in the Jefferson High district.

In 2005, the Orthopaedic Hospital had begun selling property near the school, only leaving the campus, which is a part of the outpatient clinic. In 2011, OHMMHS celebrated the Los Angeles Orthopaedic Hospital's centennial year, and in 2012, they celebrated the opening of the Metro Expo Line. In 2017, the Orthopaedic Institute for Children awarded a $200,000 grant to OHMMHS.

== Academics ==
OHMMHS currently has internship opportunities and courses with the Orthopaedic Institute for Children, Dignity Health with a three-year program, Metro with the Transportation Career Academy Program (TCAP), the University of Southern California with the Med-COR program and the Viterbi School of Engineering, and the Los Angeles Area Chamber of Commerce, which provides internships with Kaiser Permanente, the Cedars-Sinai Medical Center, and the Los Angeles Children's Hospital. The Expo Center provides OHMMHS facilities for P.E. class with an Olympic-sized pool and a soccer field.

=== Magnet ===
OHMMHS's primary magnet is focused on providing exposure to the medical field and biotechnology by partnering with groups such as The Orthopedic Institute for Children, California Hospital and Los Angeles Trade–Technical College. The school teaches students about medicine and healthcare, while also preparing them for college.

=== Rankings ===
OHMMHS has placed 90th in California high schools, 103rd in magnet high schools, and 647th in national rankings, with a College Readiness Index of 53.0/100, according to the U.S. News & World Report. They have also given OHMMHS the Best High Schools Silver Medal from 2014 to 2018.

In 2018 and 2019, OHMMHS was named a Magnet School of Excellence and a School of Distinction by the Magnet Schools of America.

In 2015, the Washington Post recognized OHMMHS as one of the most challenging high schools.

=== Advanced Placement courses ===
OHMMHS offers 14 Advanced Placement courses: AP Biology, AP Chemistry, AP English Language and Composition, AP English Literature and Composition, AP Physics 1, AP Calculus AB, AP Calculus BC, AP Psychology, AP Spanish Language, AP Statistics, AP United States Government and Politics, AP United States History, AP World History, AP Computer Science Principles, and AP Computer Science A.

=== Athletics ===
OHMMHS offers Baseball (Boys), Basketball (Boys and Girls), Cross country (Coed), Softball (Girls), Tennis (Boys and Girls), Swimming (Coed), Soccer (Boys and Girls), and Volleyball (Boys and Girls).

== Demographics ==
For the 2018–19 school year, OHMMHS had a total enrollment of 828 students. Of the 828 students, 89.8% spoke English as a second language, 5% were learning English, and 93% came from low-income families.

During the 2018–19 school year, the student-teacher ratio was 23 to 1, with 35 teachers in total. Of the 35 teachers, 8 had Dual-Master's Degrees, 7 were National Board Certified Teachers, and 1 was a Fulbright Scholar.

Ethnicity	Students (2018-2019)
Hispanic or Latino	94%
White	1%
Asian	1.5%
Black or African American	2%
Filipino	1.1%
Other/Not Reported	0.4%
