= Rebecca L. Binder =

American architect

- Born: New Jersey, United States
- Education: University of California, Los Angeles
- Occupation: Architect
- Practice: R. L. Binder FAIA Architects
- Website: www.binderarchitects.com

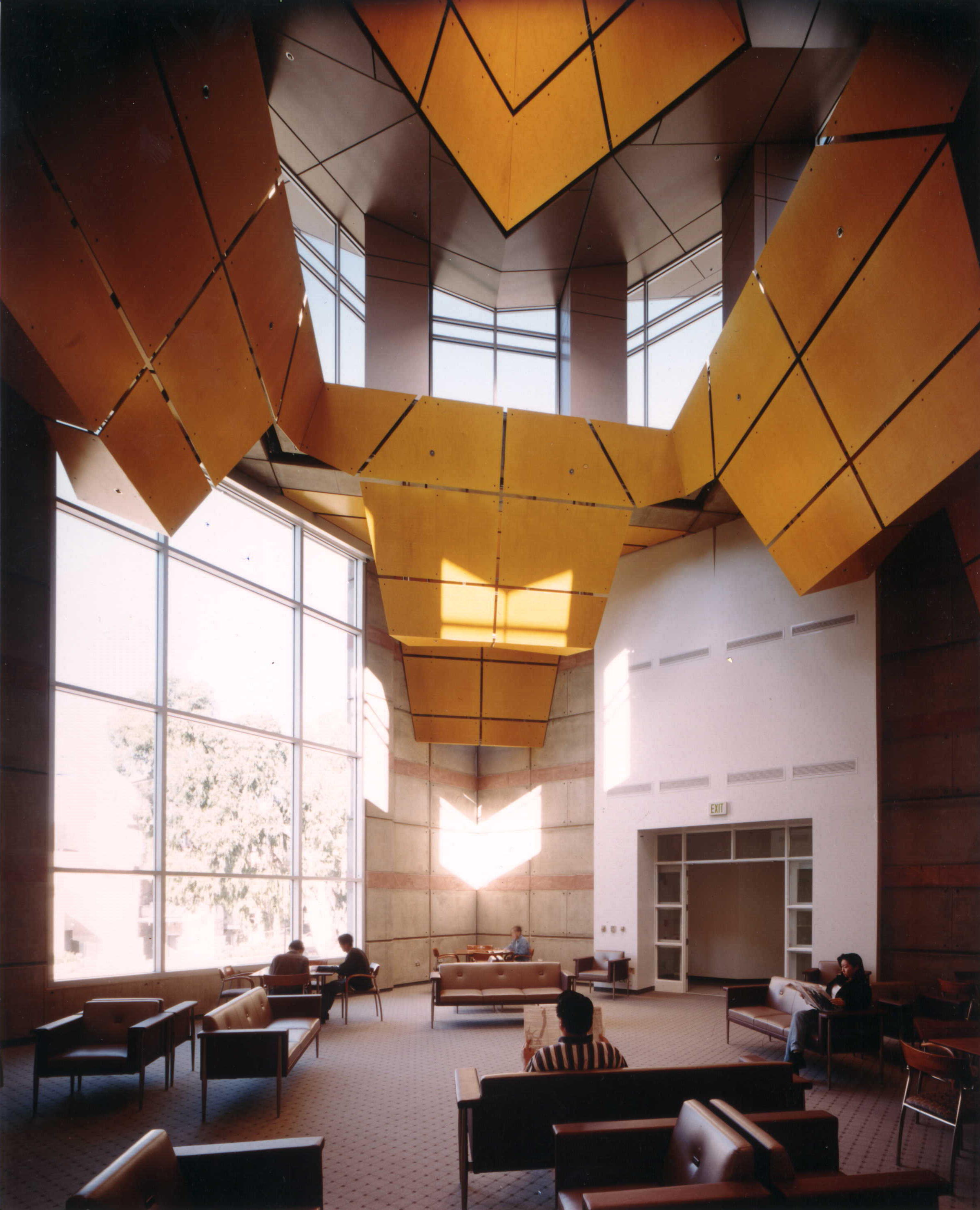
Ackerman Student Union, UCLA

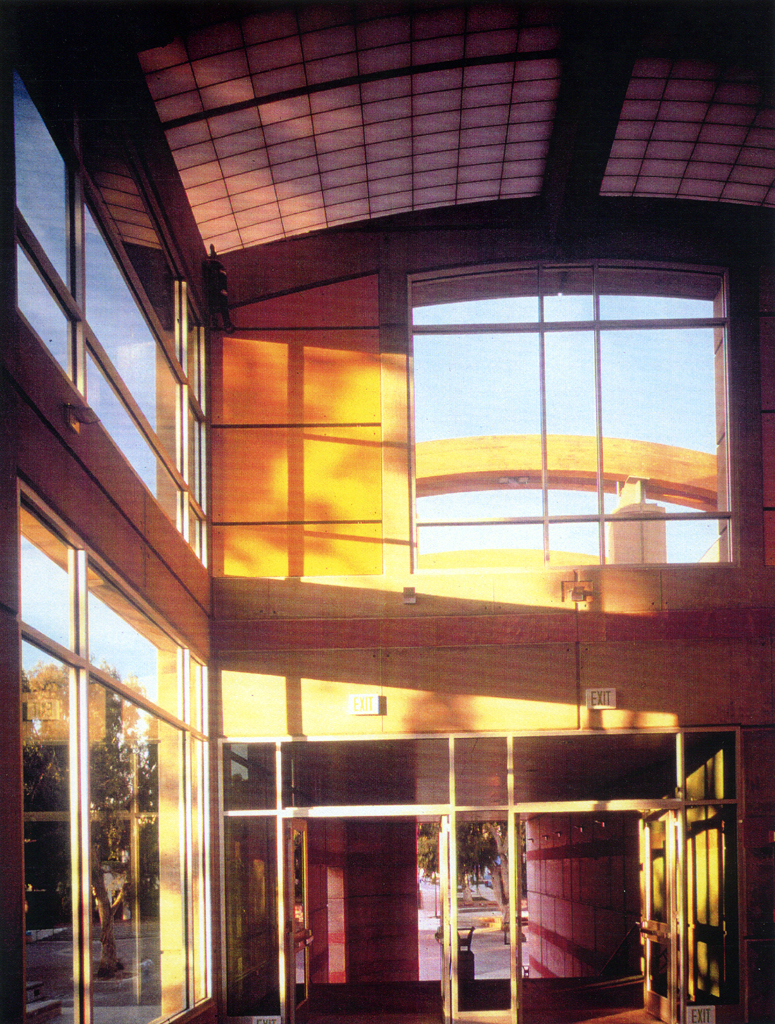
Ackerman Student Union, UCLA

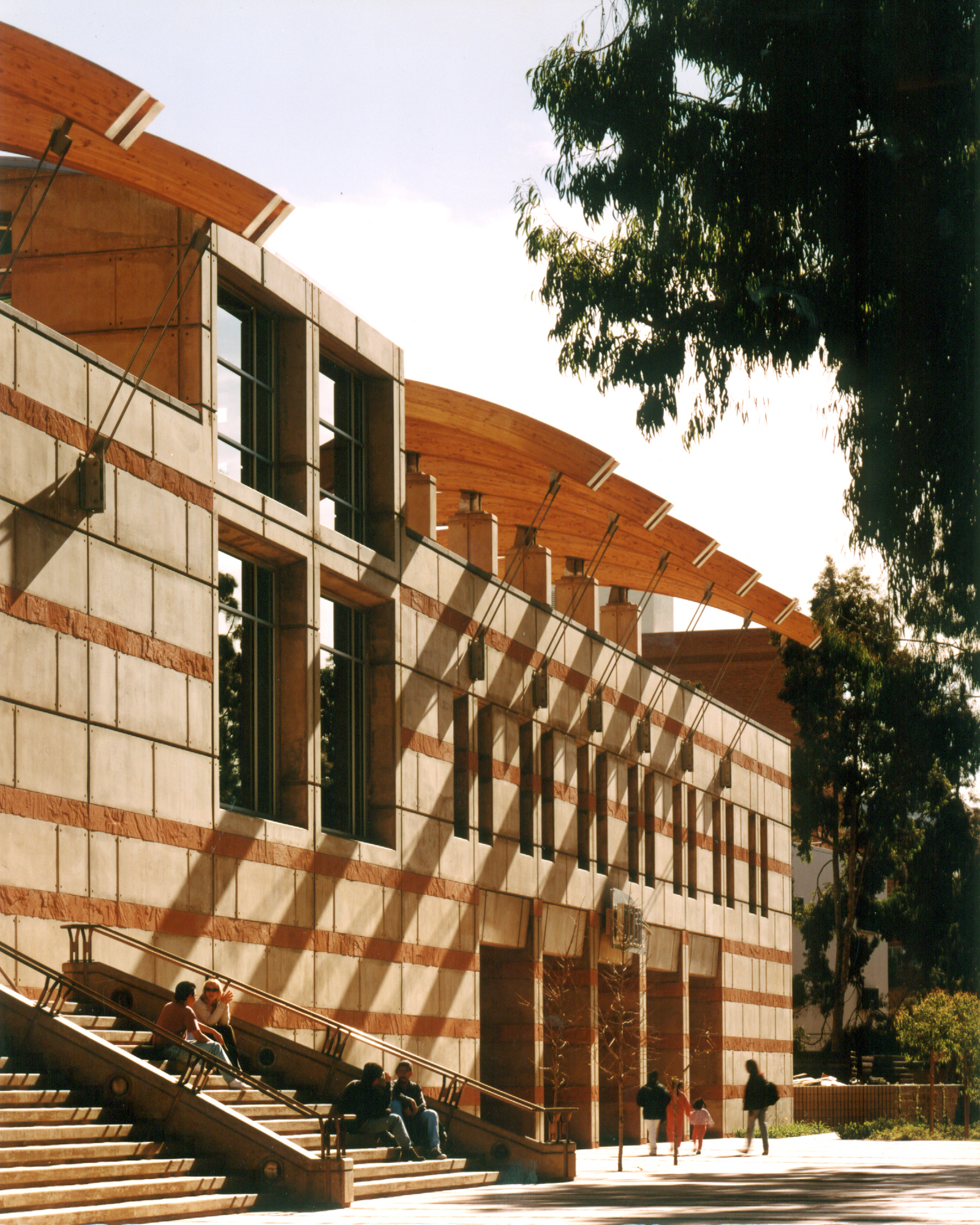
Ackerman Student Union, UCLA

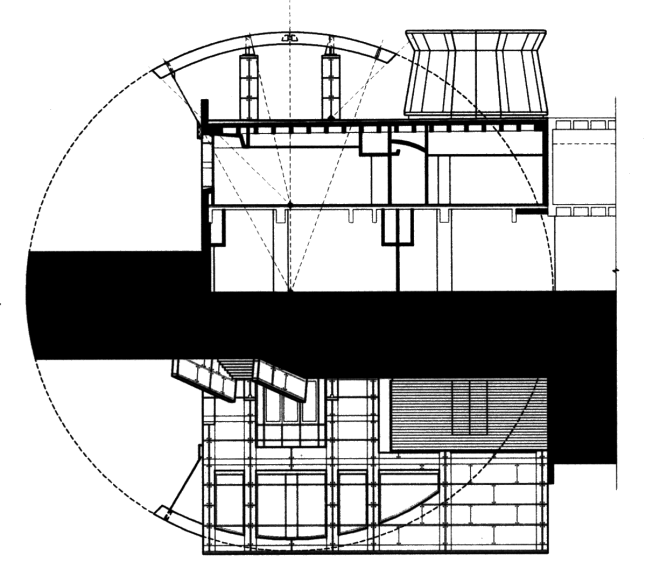
Ackerman Student Union, UCLA

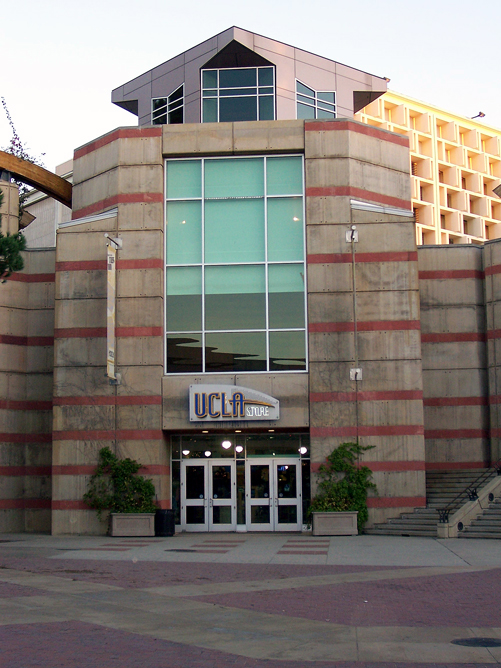
Ackerman Union, UCLA Store

Banning Justice Center, Banning, California

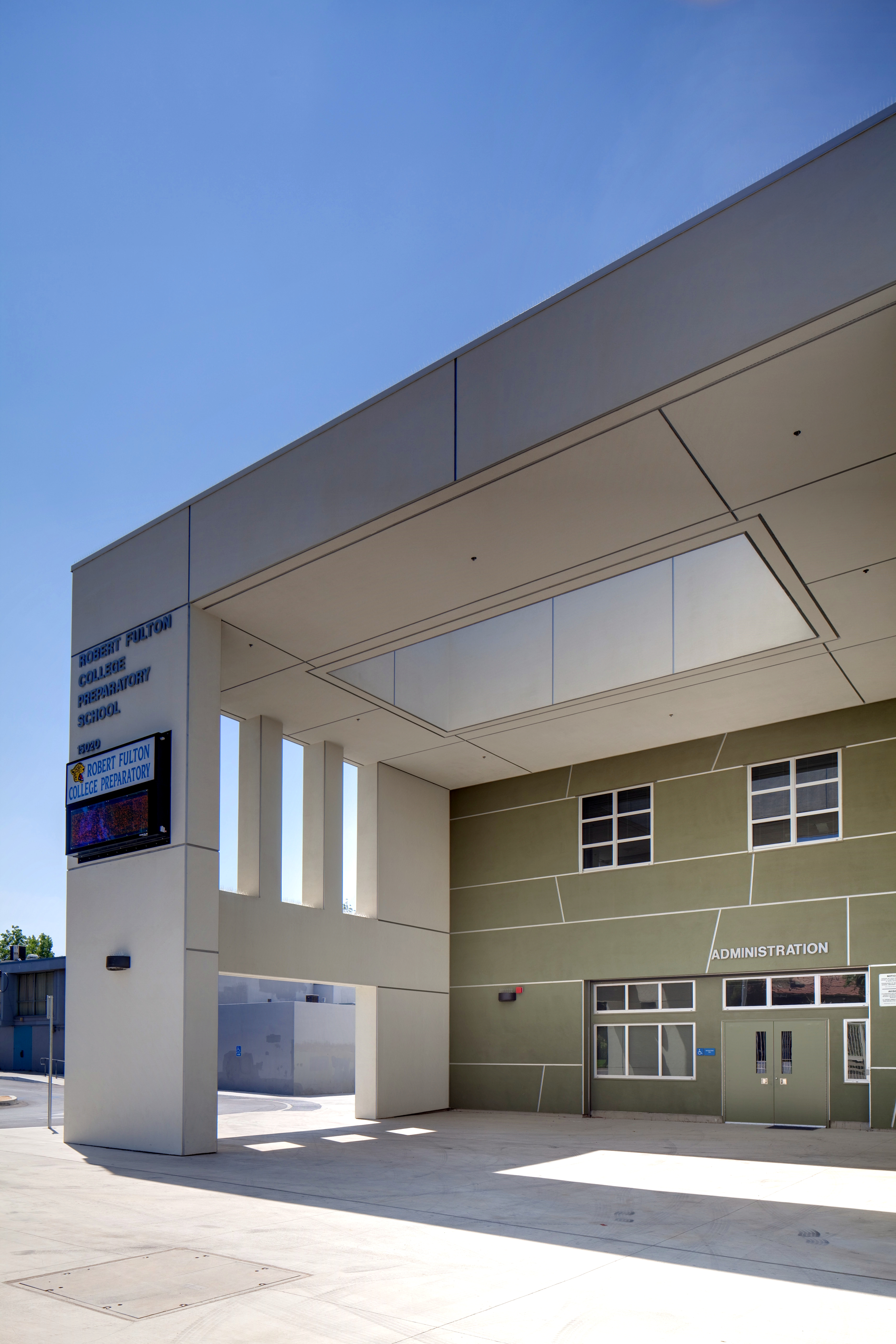
Fulton School, Los Angeles, CA

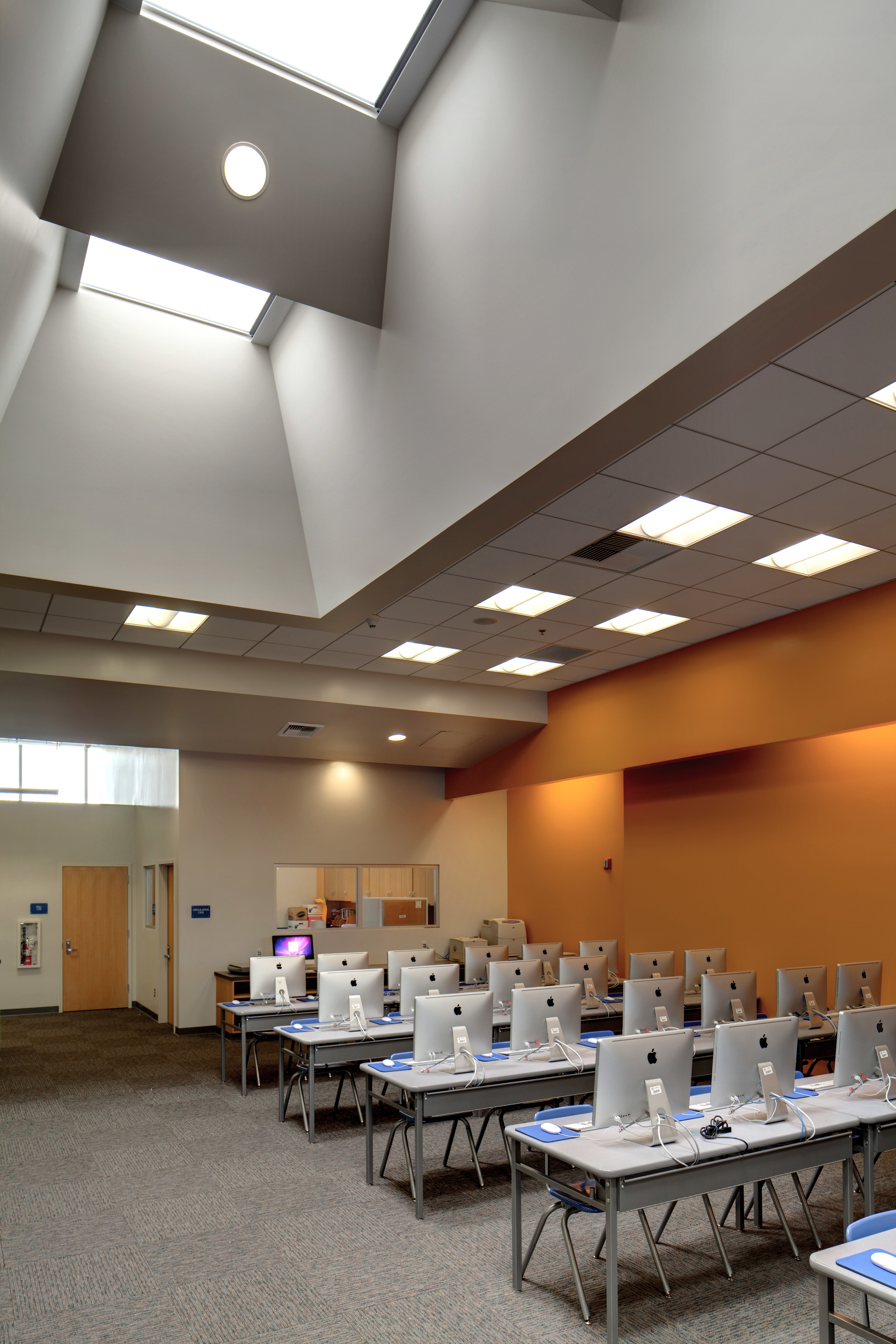
Fulton School, Los Angeles, CA

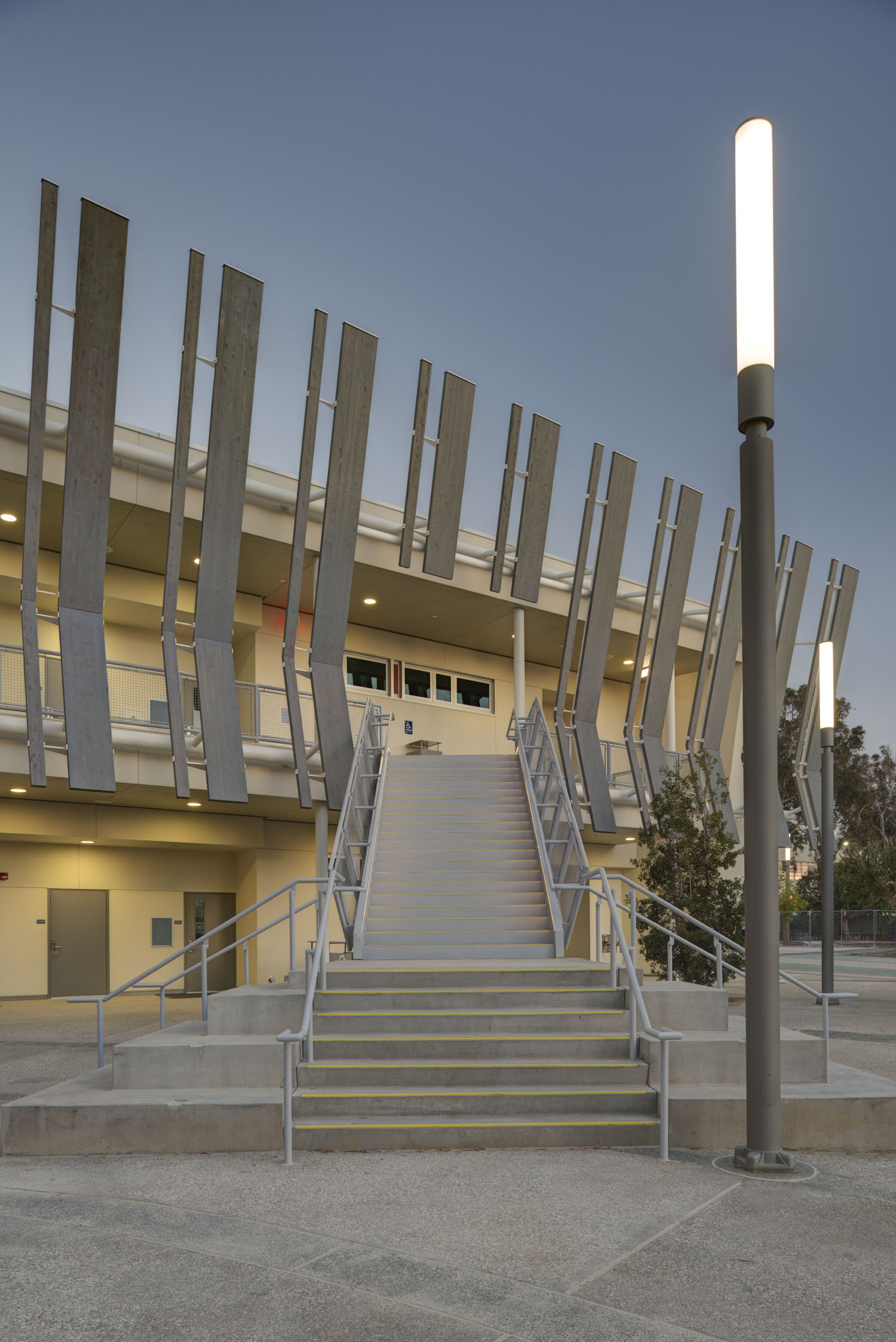
Santa Monica High School

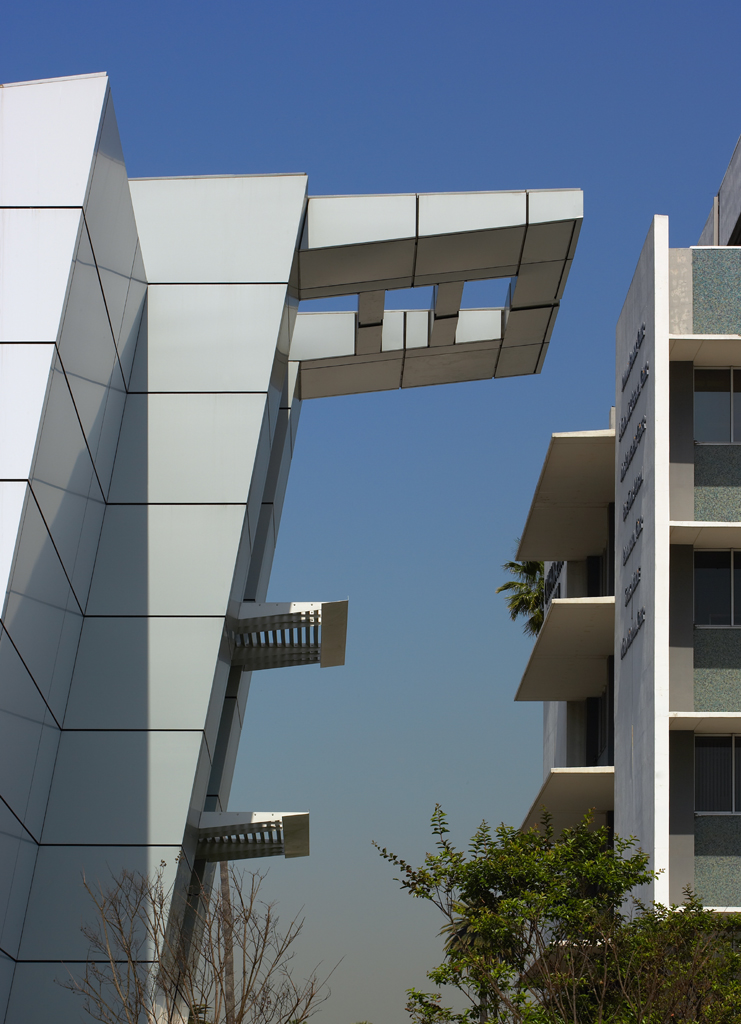
Orthopaedic Hospital, Los Angeles, CA

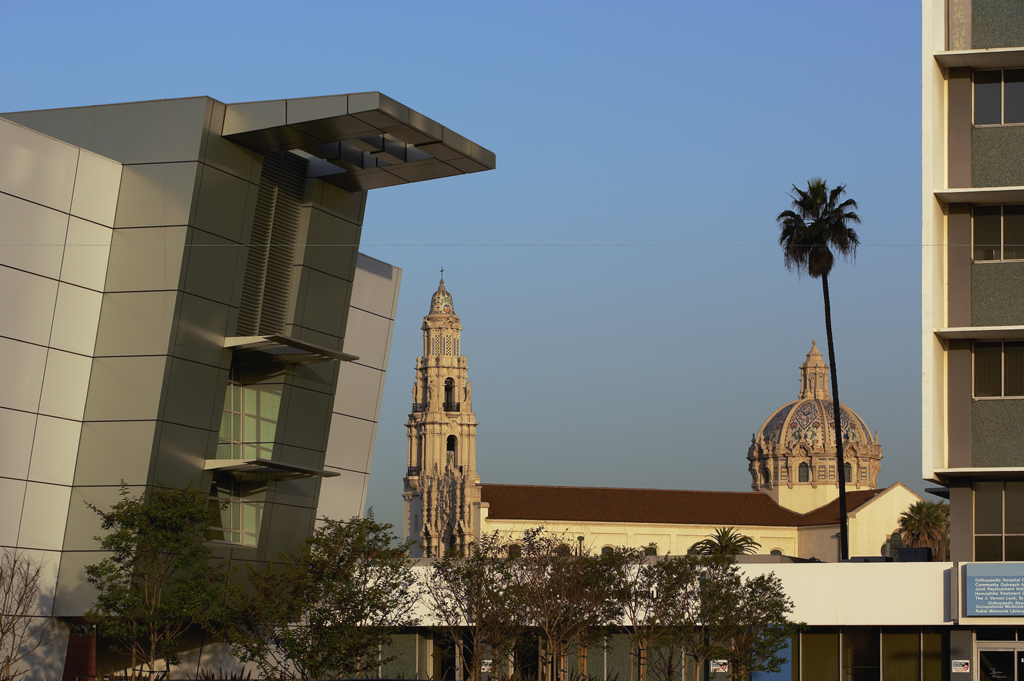
Orthopaedic Hospital, Los Angeles, CA

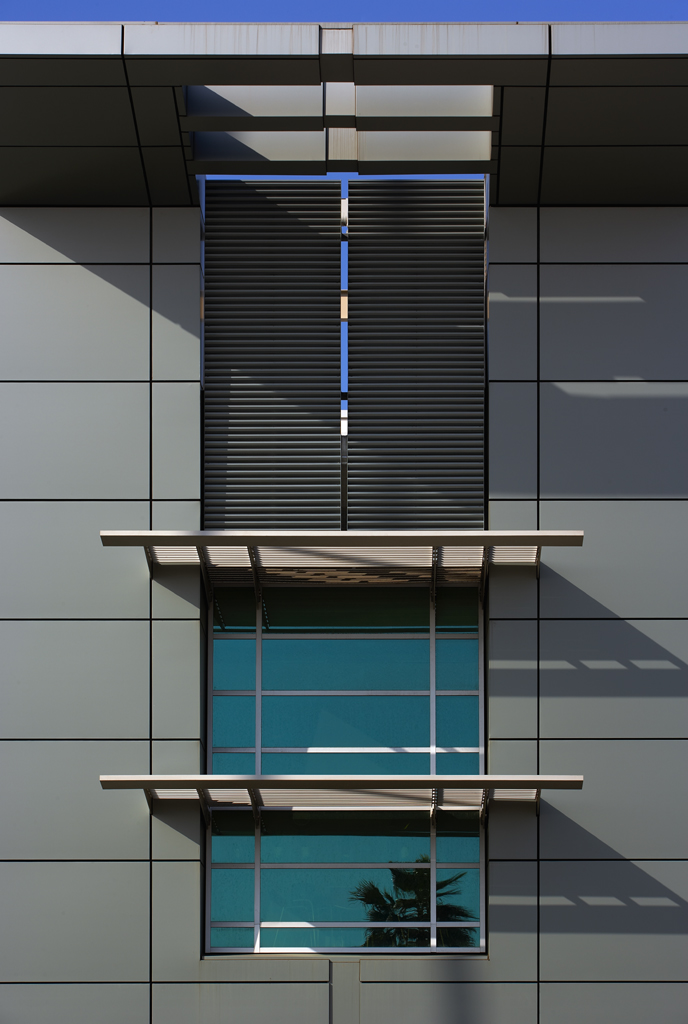
Orthopaedic Hospital, Los Angeles, CA

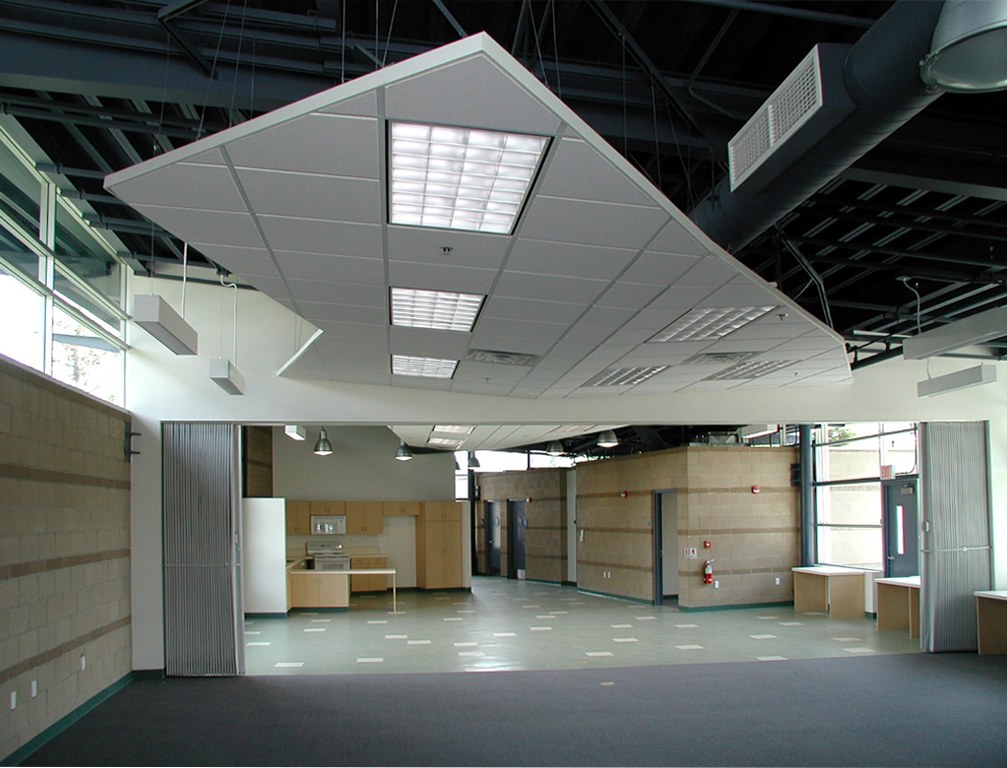
University of California, Irvine EDCC Building

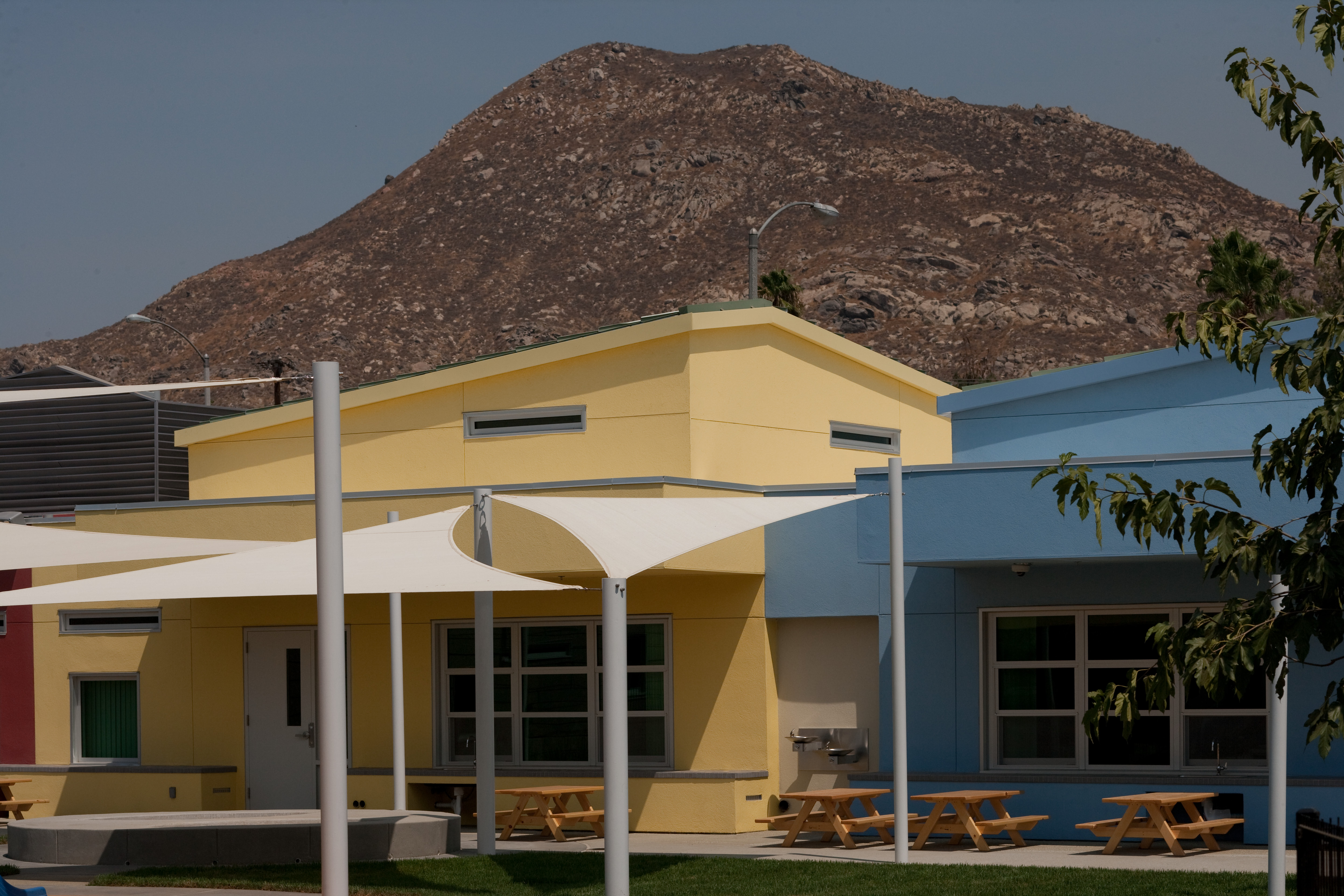
University of California, Riverside ECCDC Building

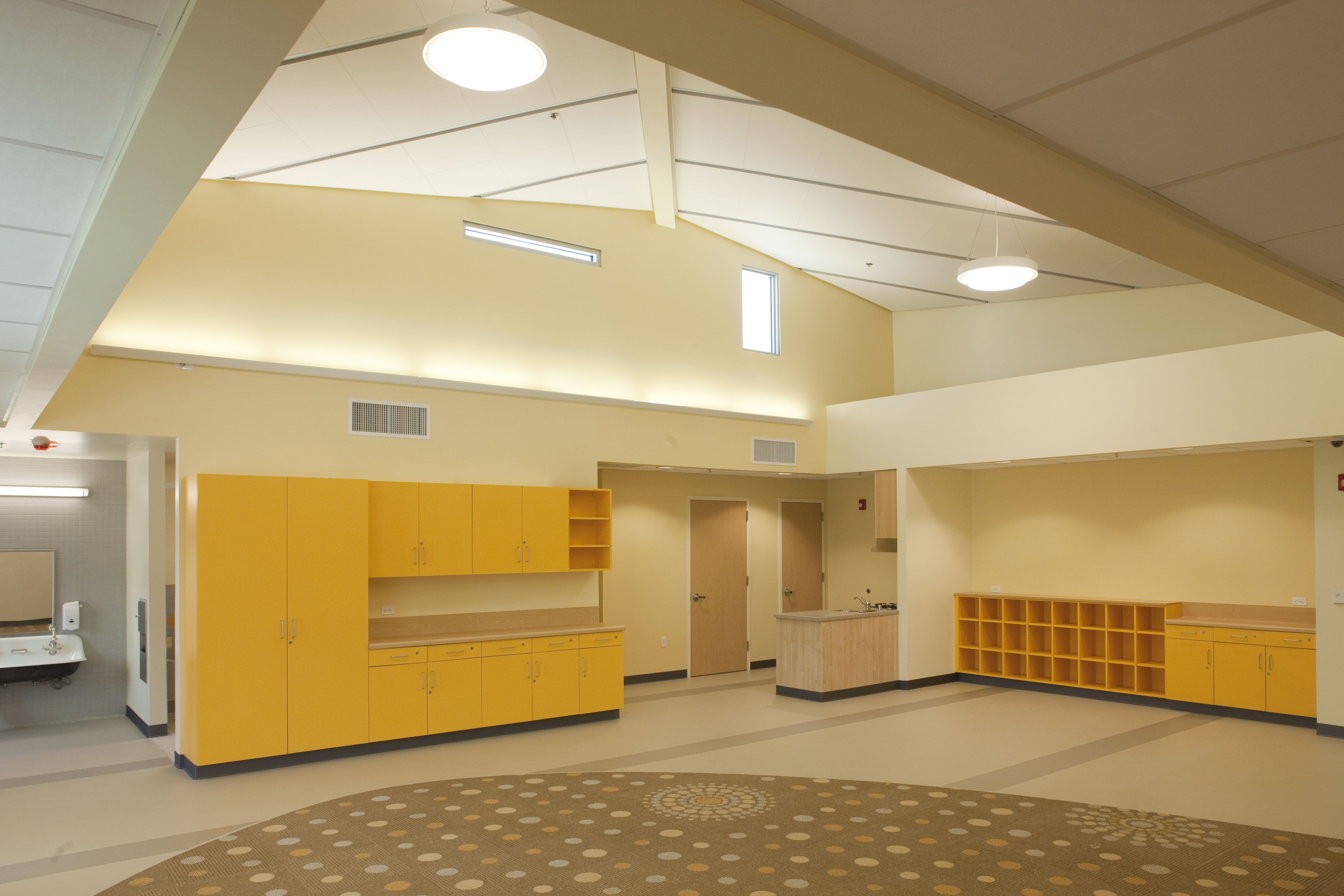
University of California, Riverside ECCDC Building Interior

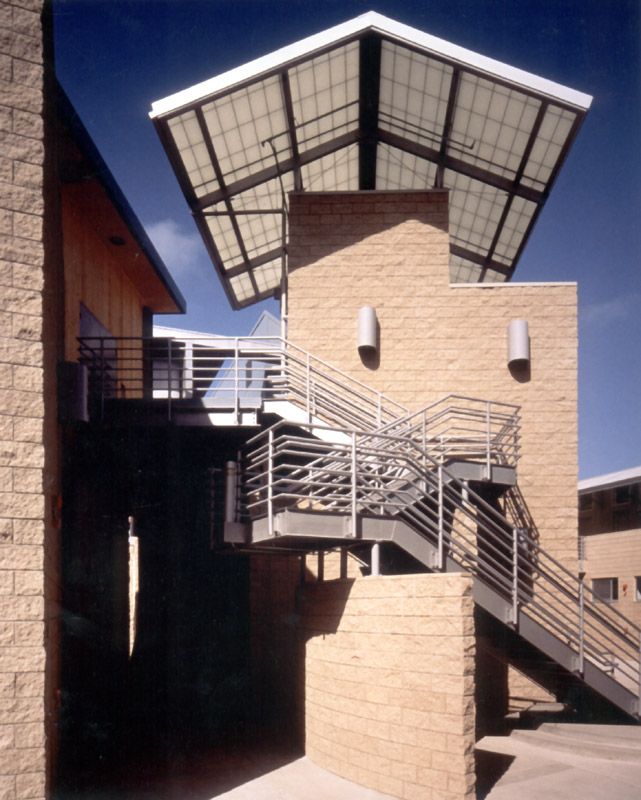
UCSD Visual Arts Facility

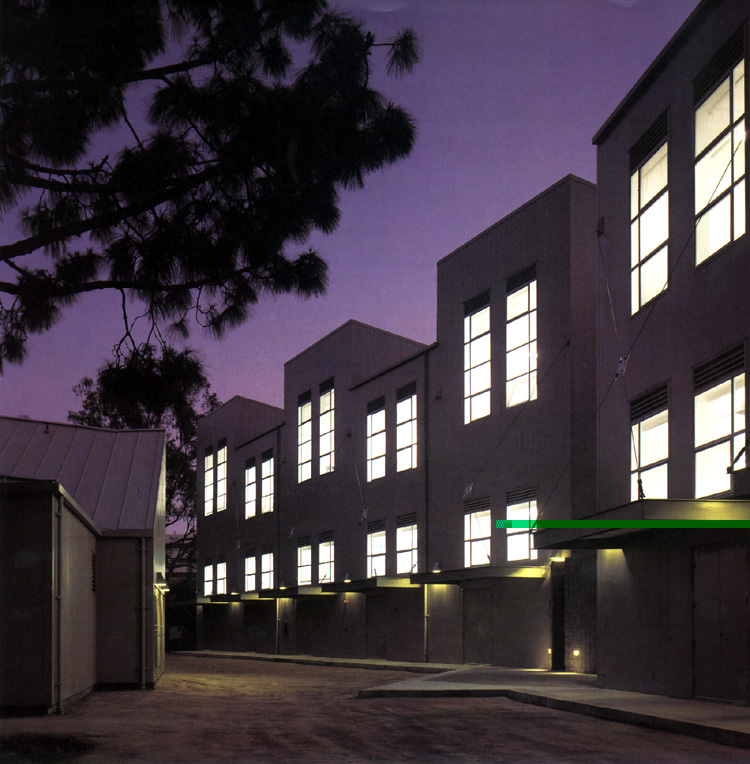
UCSD Visual Arts Facility

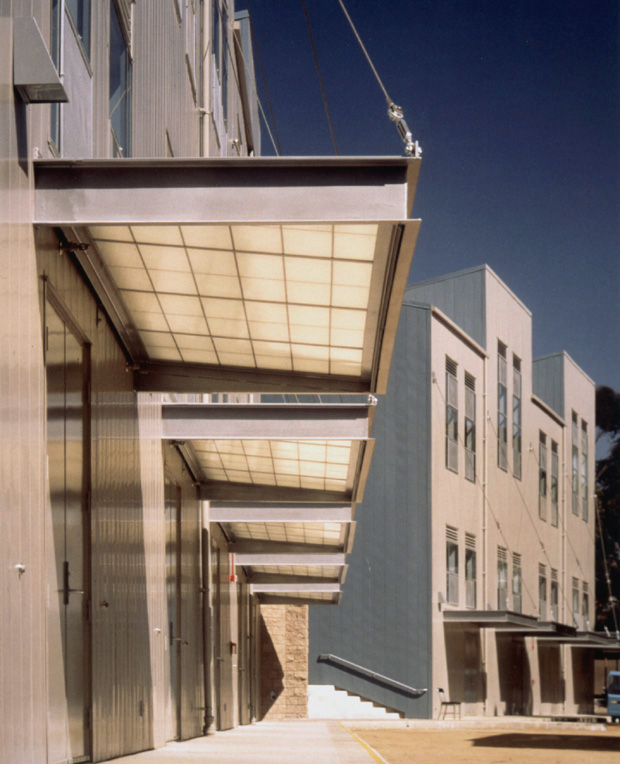
UCSD Visual Arts Facility

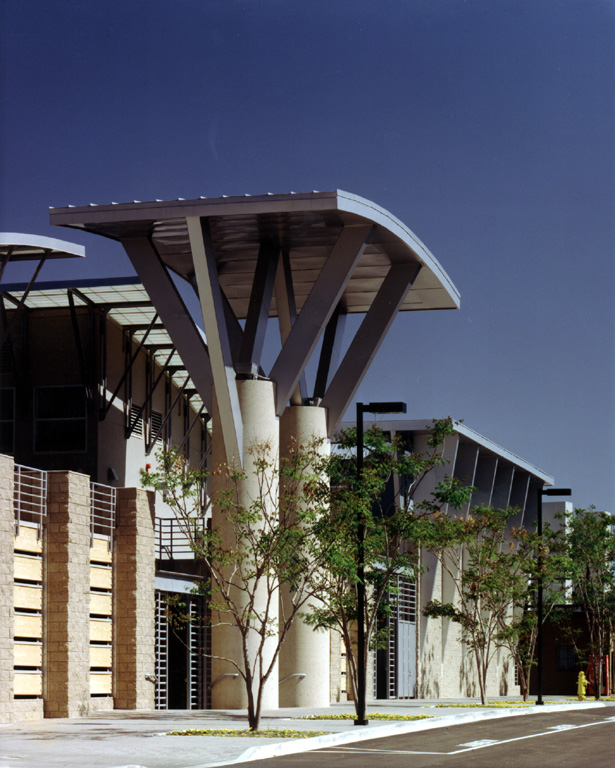
UCSD Visual Arts Facility

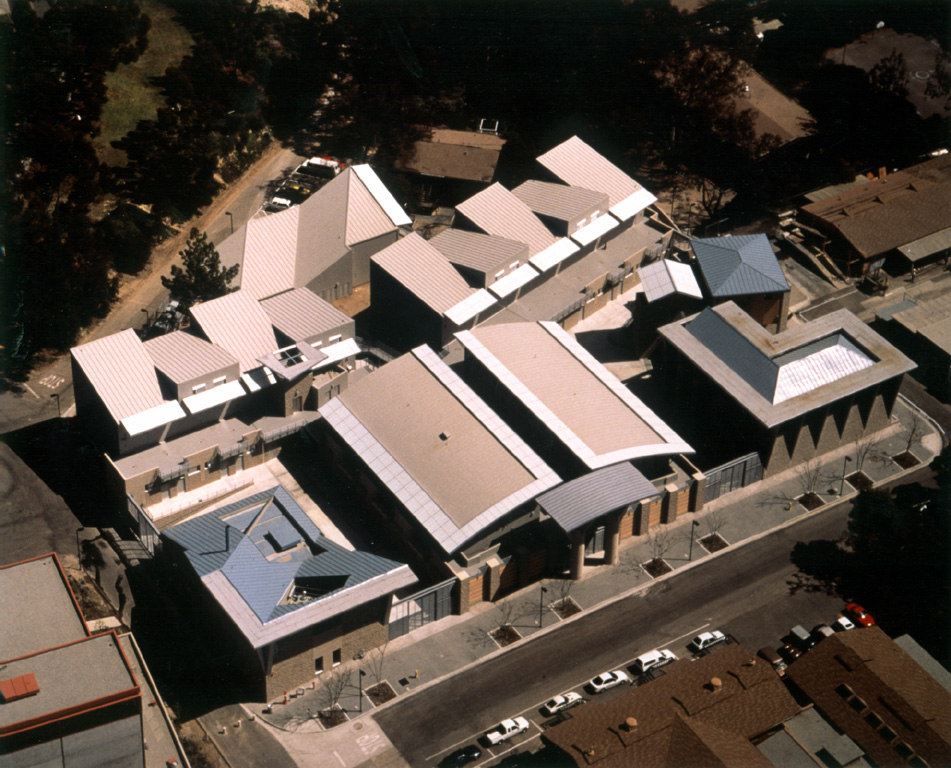
UCSD Visual Arts Facility

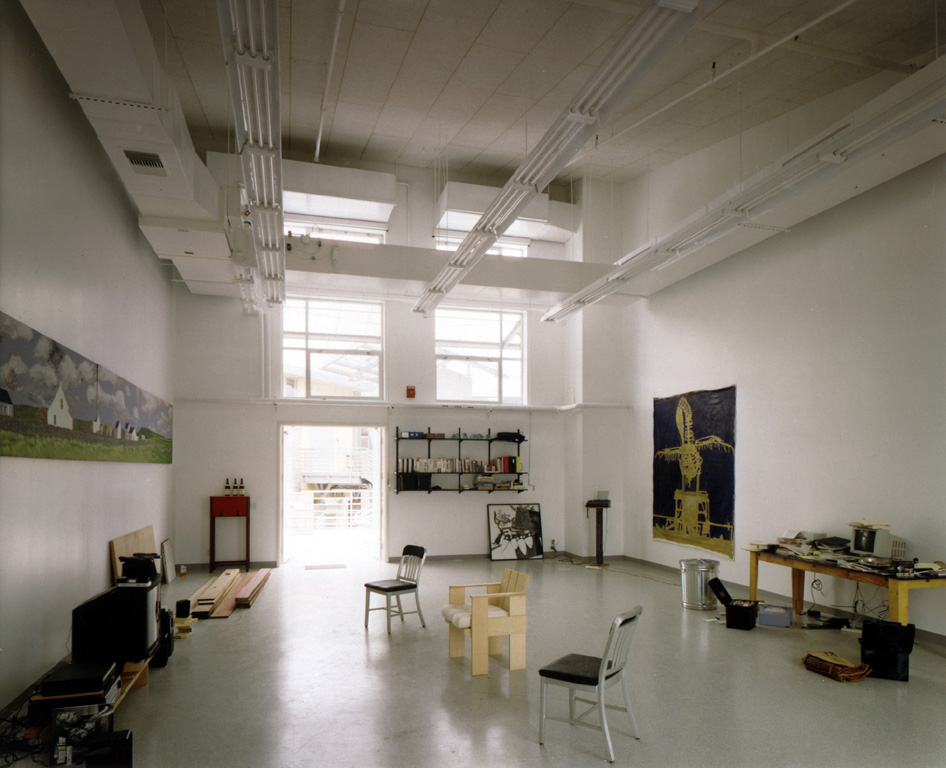
UCSD Visual Arts Facility

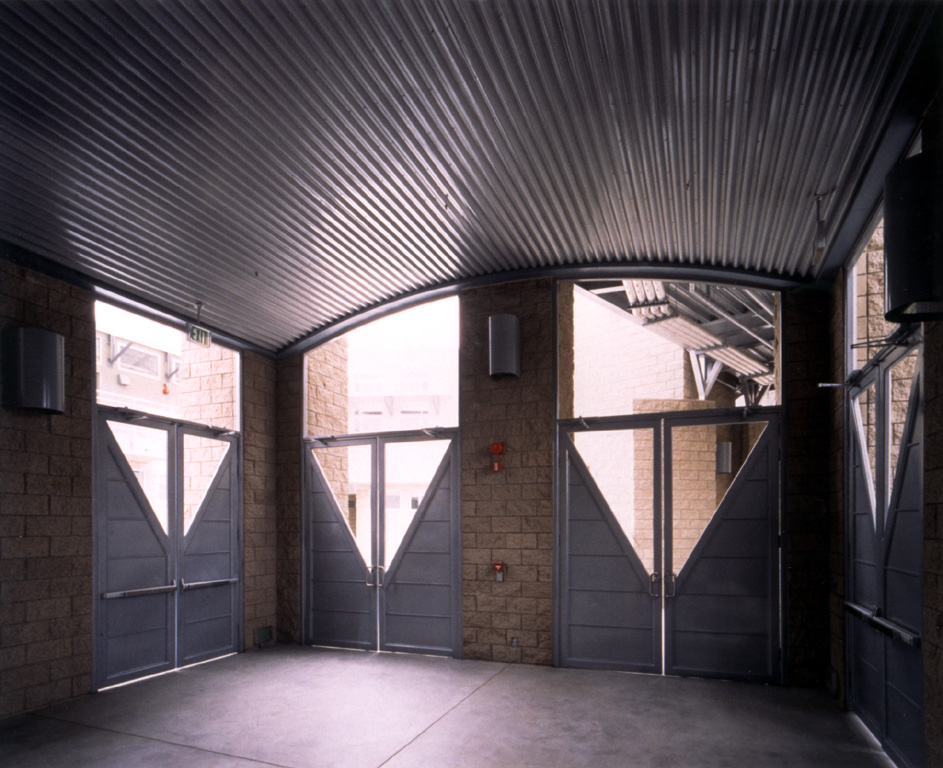
UCSD Visual Arts Facility

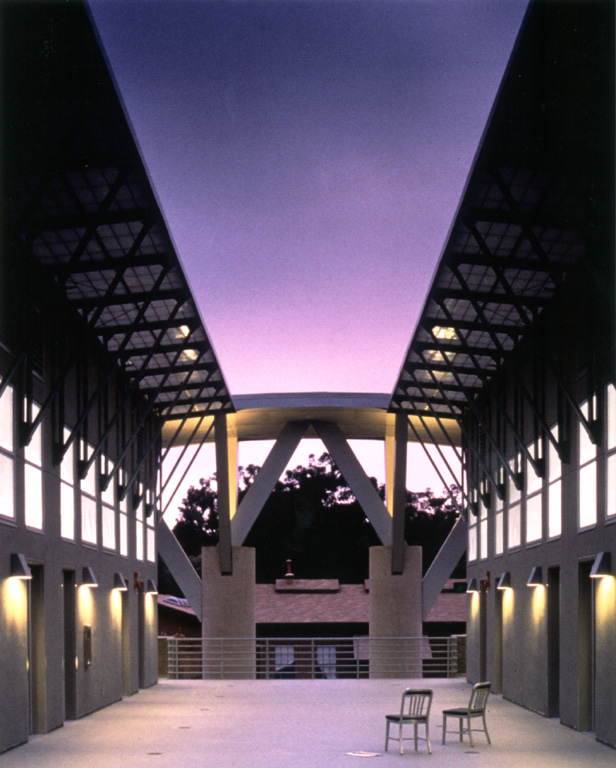
UCSD Visual Arts Facility

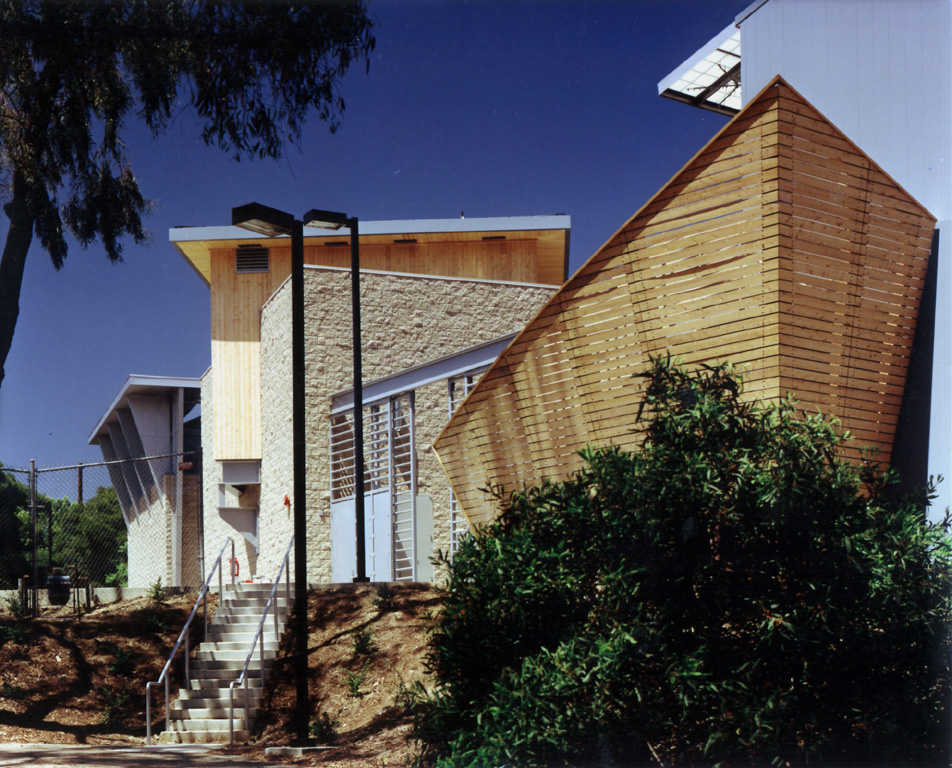
UCSD Visual Arts Facility

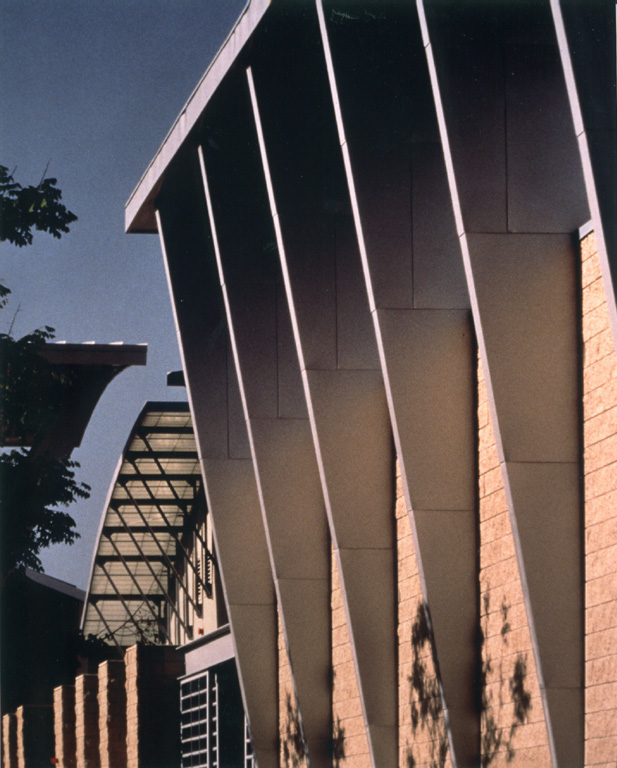
UCSD Visual Arts Facility

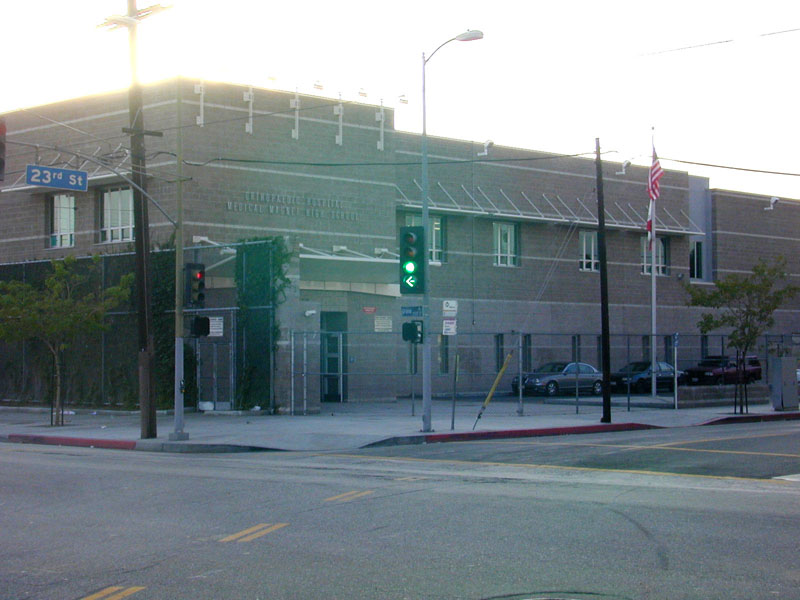
Orthopaedic Hospital MMHS

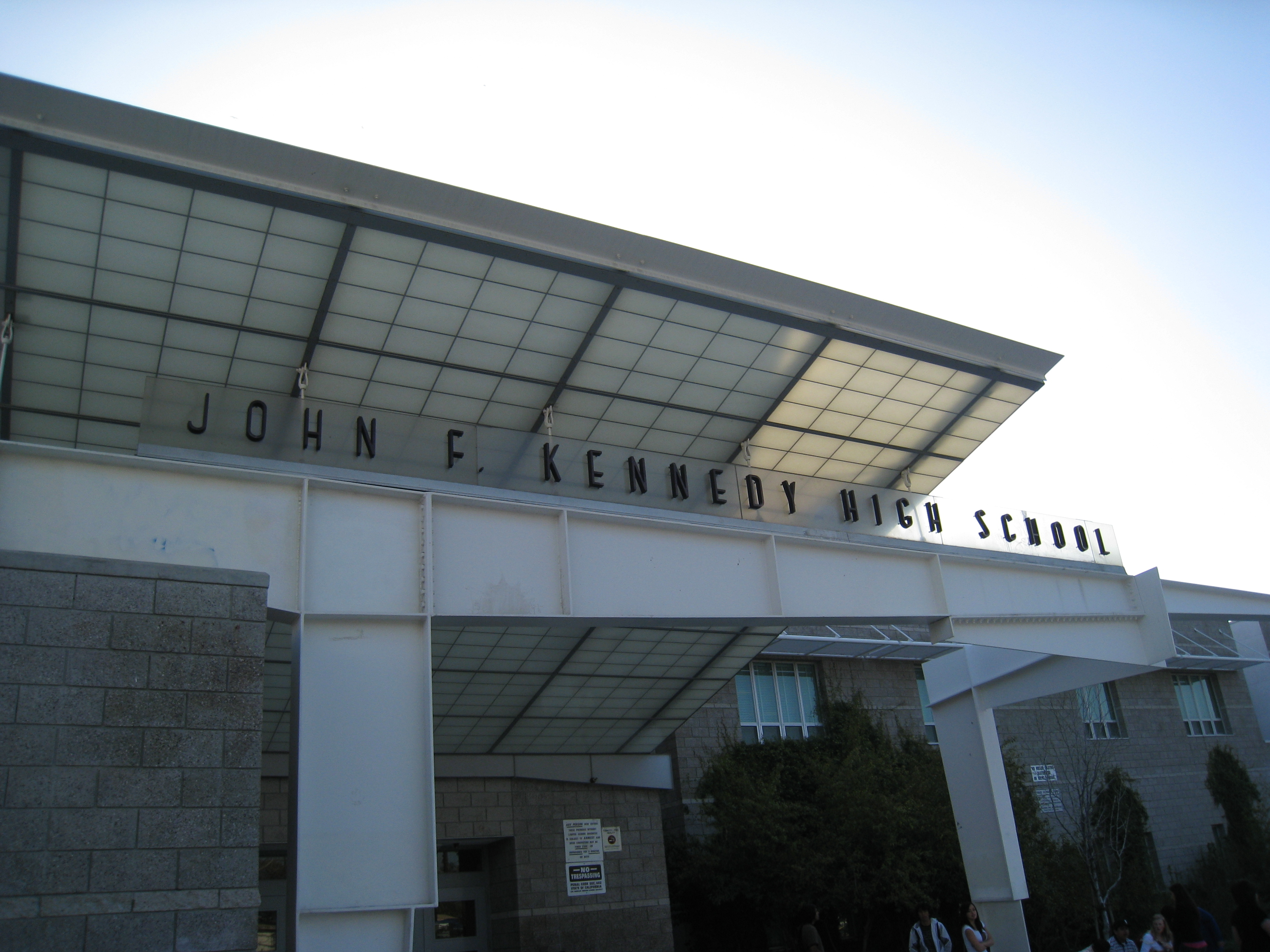
Kennedy High School (Los Angeles)

Rebecca L. Binder is an American architect, designer, and educator. She established R. L. Binder FAIA Architects, LLP, in 1979, in Playa del Rey, California. In 1990, Binder was named a Fellow of the American Institute of Architects. Her work has received significant recognition, including local, state and national awards. In 2001, the American Institute of Architects California Chapter presented Binder with the California "Firm of the Year" award.

== Education ==
Binder received her Bachelor of Arts in English literature from the University of Pennsylvania and continued her studies at the University of Exeter, England. In 1975 she received her Masters of Architecture degree from University of California, Los Angeles.

== Teaching ==
Binder was a professor at the Southern California Institute of Architecture (SCI-Arc) from 1978 to 1988, teaching Architectural Design and Theory.

== Significant buildings ==
- Pacific Townhouses, Santa Monica, California (1982).
- Satellite Food Facility, UCI, Irvine, California, United States (1989).
- Information Computer Sciences / Engineering Research Facility – Phase 3, UCI, Irvine, California, United States (1991).
- Visual Arts Facility, UCSD, San Diego, California, United States (1993).
- University Dining Complex, Cal-Poly State University, San Luis Obispo, California, United States (1994).
- Ackerman Student Union Building, UCLA, Los Angeles, California, United States (1997).
- Cast Services Center, Disneyland, Anaheim, California, United States (1999).
- Palms Area Child Care Center, Dept. of Rec. and Parks, West Los Angeles, California, United States (2002).
- Admin. Building, Science Lab Building, Classroom Building, Theatre, Library, Gymnasium Building and Central Plant, Kennedy Senior High School, Granada Hills, California, United States (2002).
- Extended Day Care Center, UCI, Irvine, California, United States (2002).
- New Clinic Building, Orthopaedic Hospital, Los Angeles, California, United States (2003).
- Orthopaedic Hospital Medical Magnet High School, Los Angeles, California, United States (2003).
- North Campus Family Housing, Recreation & Daycare, UCSB, Goleta, California, United States (2003).
- University Student Union, CSUN, Northridge, California, United States (2003).
- City of Los Angeles, Playa Vista Fire Station No 67, Los Angeles, California (2005).
- New Riverside County Banning Justice Center, Banning, California (2015).

== Awards ==
AIA/National Council, Honor Award, 1985.

Pacific Townhouses - Santa Monica, California

AIA/California Council, Honor Award, 1985.

Pacific Townhouses - Santa Monica, California

AIA/Los Angeles Chapter, Honor Award, 1982.

Pacific Townhouses - Santa Monica, California

Restaurant & Hotel Magazine, Design Award of Merit, 1984.

Eats Restaurant - El Segundo, California

Los Angeles American Institute of Architects, Honor Award, 1982.

116 Pacific Condominiums - Santa Monica, CA

California Council, American Institute of Architects, Honor Award, 1985.

Eats Restaurant - Santa Monica, California

California Council, American Institute of Architects, Honor Award, 1985.

116 Pacific Condominiums - Santa Monica, California

National Council, American Institute of Architects, Honor Award, 1985.

116 Pacific Condominiums - Santa Monica, California

Los Angeles American Institute of Architects, Merit Award, 1985.

Eats Restaurant - El Segundo, California

Los Angeles American Institute of Architects, Honor Award, 1986.

Bernstein Residence - Sherman Oaks, California

Concrete Masonry Association of California & Nevada, Honor Award, 1986.

Binder Residence - Playa del Rey, California

Concrete Masonry Association of California & Nevada, Grand Award, 1990.

UC Irvine Satellite Food Facility - Irvine, California

San Diego, American Institute of Architects, Design Award, 1990.

UCSD Visual Arts Facility - San Diego, California

City of Los Angeles, Mayor's Award, 1992.

Northeast Valley Multipurpose Senior Center - Pacoima, California

National Council, American Institute of Architects with National Concrete Masonry Association, Award of Design Excellence, 1994.

UCSD Visual Arts Facility - San Diego, California

CCAIA / Western States Concrete Masonry Association Merit Award, 1994.

UCSD Visual Arts Facility - San Diego, California

American Concrete Institute, Southern California Chapter Award, 1997.

UCLA Ackerman Student Union - Westwood, California

LA Business Journal Awards, Best Design in LA County Award, 1998.

UCLA Ackerman Student Union - Westwood, California

NCMA / American Institute of Architects, National Honor Award, 1998.

Northeast Valley Multipurpose Senior Center - Pacoima, California

CCAIA / CMA Design Award, 2000.

Kennedy Sr. HS Administration Building.

AIACC Firm Award, 2001.

Excellence in Architectural Design Award, Los Angeles Cultural Affairs Commission, 2005.

Fire Station No. 67

== Books ==
- Nesmith, Eleanor L. Rebecca L. Binder. Rockport, Mass: Rockport Pub, 1995.
- Predock, Antoine. Rebecca L. Binder: Spatial Dynamics. Milan: L'Arca Edizioni, 1999.

== Bibliography ==
- Whiteson, Leon. "Campus Moxie." Architecture 82.7 (1993): 86–92.
- Nesmith, Lynn. "Church And State." Architecture 80.10 (1991): 34–35.
- "Details." Architecture 81.8 (1992): 24.
- M. J., C. "High-Tech Shell, Sculpted Spaces." Architecture 74.5 (1985): 294–297.
- Light, Amy Gray. "An Ingratiating Entry And A Palette Of Muted Pastels." Architecture 78.(1989): 77. Art Source. Web. 4 Feb. 2016.
- "Pacific Condominiums, Santa Monica, California, 1980-82. Architects: Stafford Binder Architects: Rebecca L. Binder And James G. Stafford; Associate: Ronald J. Fiala." GA Houses 13 (1983): 168–173.
- “Binder, Rebecca – BWAF Dynamic National Archive.” Accessed October 12, 2021. https://dna.bwaf.org/architect/binder-rebecca.
- “IAWA Biographical Database.” Accessed October 12, 2021. https://iawadb.lib.vt.edu/view_all.php?person_pk=10&table=bio.
- Nesmith, Eleanor Lynn, and Stanley Tigerman. Rebecca L. Binder. Rockport, Massachusetts: Rockport Publishers, 1995.
