= Wilshire Tower =

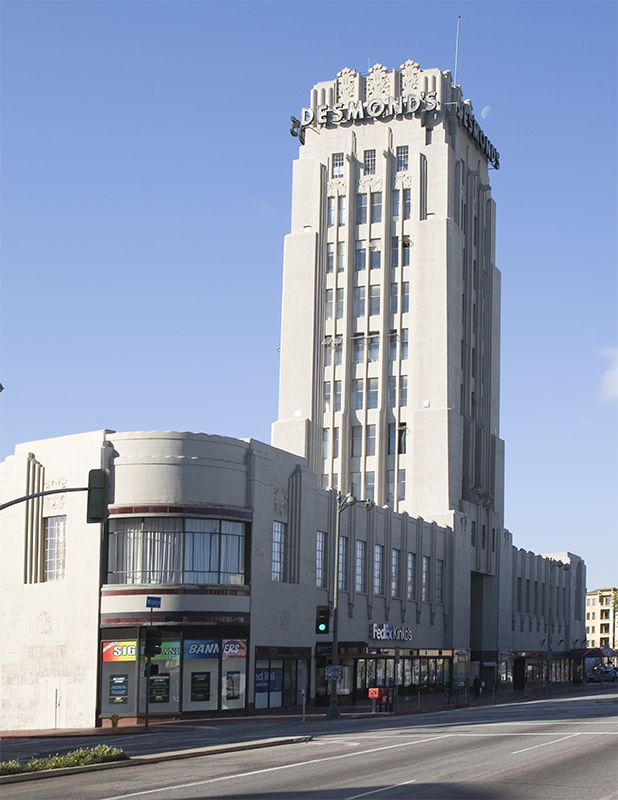
- Interactive map of the Wilshire Tower area

General information
- Architectural style: Art Deco
- Location: 5514 Wilshire Boulevard, Los Angeles, California
- Coordinates: 34.0621°N 118.3489°W
- Opened: 1929

Design and construction
- Architect: Gilbert Stanley Underwood

Wilshire Tower is a nine-story tower at 5514 Wilshire Boulevard on the Miracle Mile in the city of Los Angeles. It was designed by Gilbert Stanley Underwood, who was also the architect of the Ahwahnee Hotel in Yosemite National Park, the Grand Canyon Lodge in Arizona, and the federal courthouse in downtown Los Angeles. The style of the building combines two Art Deco variations: Zigzag Moderne and Streamline Moderne. It was the earliest significant structure in the neighborhood and helped the founder of Miracle Mile, A. W. Ross, bring more stores and offices to the area.

The Los Angeles Conservancy describes the building as

"an eight-story Zigzag Moderne rectangle of offices that vaulted skyward from a wide Streamline Moderne base, a striking and optimistic structure that helped set the architectural standard for Wilshire Boulevard. The lobby featured fourteen-karat gold ceiling detailing; the sidewalk display windows were trimmed in rich black and red granite.

Desmond's and Silverwoods department stores based in Downtown Los Angeles, opened branch stores in each of the respective the ground floor wings. Much of the tower space was rented by doctors and dentists for offices. Desmond's branch, at the time of opening of this branch in March 1929, was the largest men's clothing store in the Los Angeles downtown.

== Sources ==
- Wallach, R. (2013). Miracle Mile in Los Angeles: History and Architecture. History Press. ISBN 978-1-62584-635-8.
