= Walter P. Story Building =

Building in Los Angeles, California

- U.S. Historic district – Contributing property
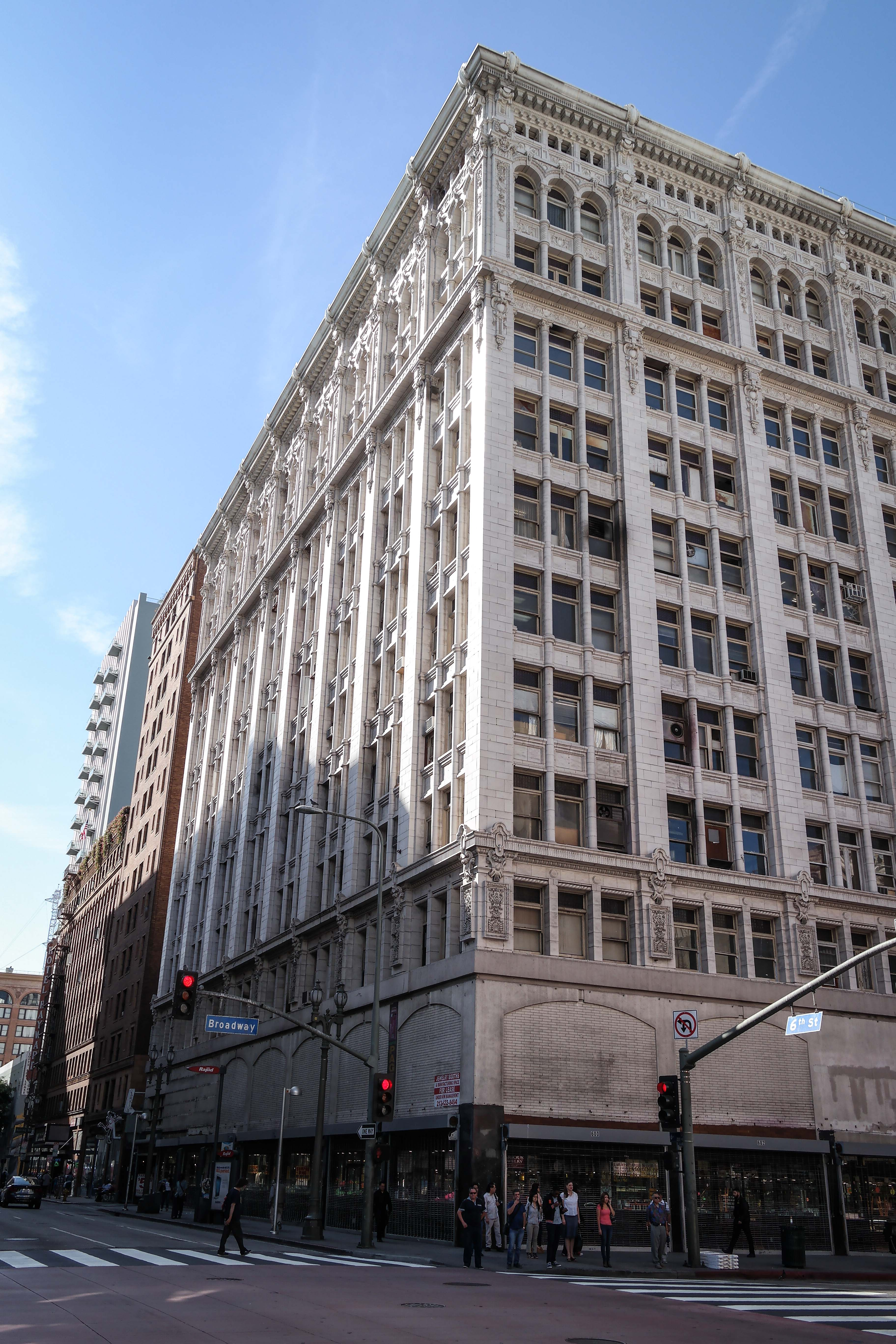
- The building in 2014

- Location within the Los Angeles metropolitan area
- Location: 610 S. Broadway and 236 W. 6th Street, Los Angeles, California
- Coordinates: 34°02′46″N 118°15′07″W
- Built: 1909
- Architect: Morgan & Walls
- Architectural style: Beaux Arts
- Part of: Broadway Theater and Commercial District (ID79000484)
- Designated CP: May 9, 1979

Walter P. Story Building, also known as the New Story Building, is a historic eleven story high-rise located at 610 S. Broadway and 236 W. 6th Street in the Broadway Theater District in the historic core of downtown Los Angeles. It is a contributing property in the Broadway Theater and Commercial District.

== History ==
Walter P. Story Building was designed by Morgan & Walls for Walter Perry Story, on land bought from James Boon Lankershim by Story's father for $48,000 in 1894 ($1.79 million in 2025). Built in 1909, the building was one of Los Angeles's first skyscrapers and upon completion was home to a 28,000 square feet (2,600 m^{2}) Mullen and Bluett department store in its basement and bottom three stories. A pied-à-terre for Story and his wife was included on the top story, complete with gardens and servants’ quarters.

Walter P. Story Building opened in February 1910 and was entirely occupied within two months, making it "one of the most successful buildings in the city" at the time. The building's garage entrance, added in 1934, was designed by Stiles Clements.

Upon Story's death in 1957, the building was sold at auction. It was purchased by Fisher-Cooper Realty for $1.5 million ($17.2 million in 2025), after which they renovated and renamed it New Story Building. Mullen and Bluett moved out in the 1960s.

In 1979, the Broadway Theater and Commercial District was added to the National Register of Historic Places, with Walter P. Story Building listed as a contributing property in the district. In 1980, the building was converted to jewelry industry use, with the building's ground floor was later converted to jewelry booths.

== Architecture and design ==
Walter P. Story Building is 150 feet tall and rectangular in plan, with a 120-foot frontage on Broadway and 160 feet on 6th Street. It was built using reinforced concrete with a terra cotta facade, and features Beaux Arts architecture with decorative bands, arched windows, brackets, and heavy cornice that terminates the composition. The building's parking garage features Zigzag Moderne gates and an entrance that has been called "a high point of the Moderne in Los Angeles."

All interior corridors feature marble floors and wainscoting to the height of the doors. The lobby also features a compact marble staircase, wide banisters, two-story newel posts, and a Tiffany-style stained glass skylight. Upon opening, the building's ground floor contained the largest plate glass windows west of Chicago. The building contained twelve of these windows, at a total cost of $12,000 ($430,000 in 2025).

== See also ==
- List of contributing properties in the Broadway Theater and Commercial District
