= Miracle Mile, Los Angeles =

Neighborhood of Los Angeles, California, USA

Miracle Mile
- Neighborhood of Los Angeles
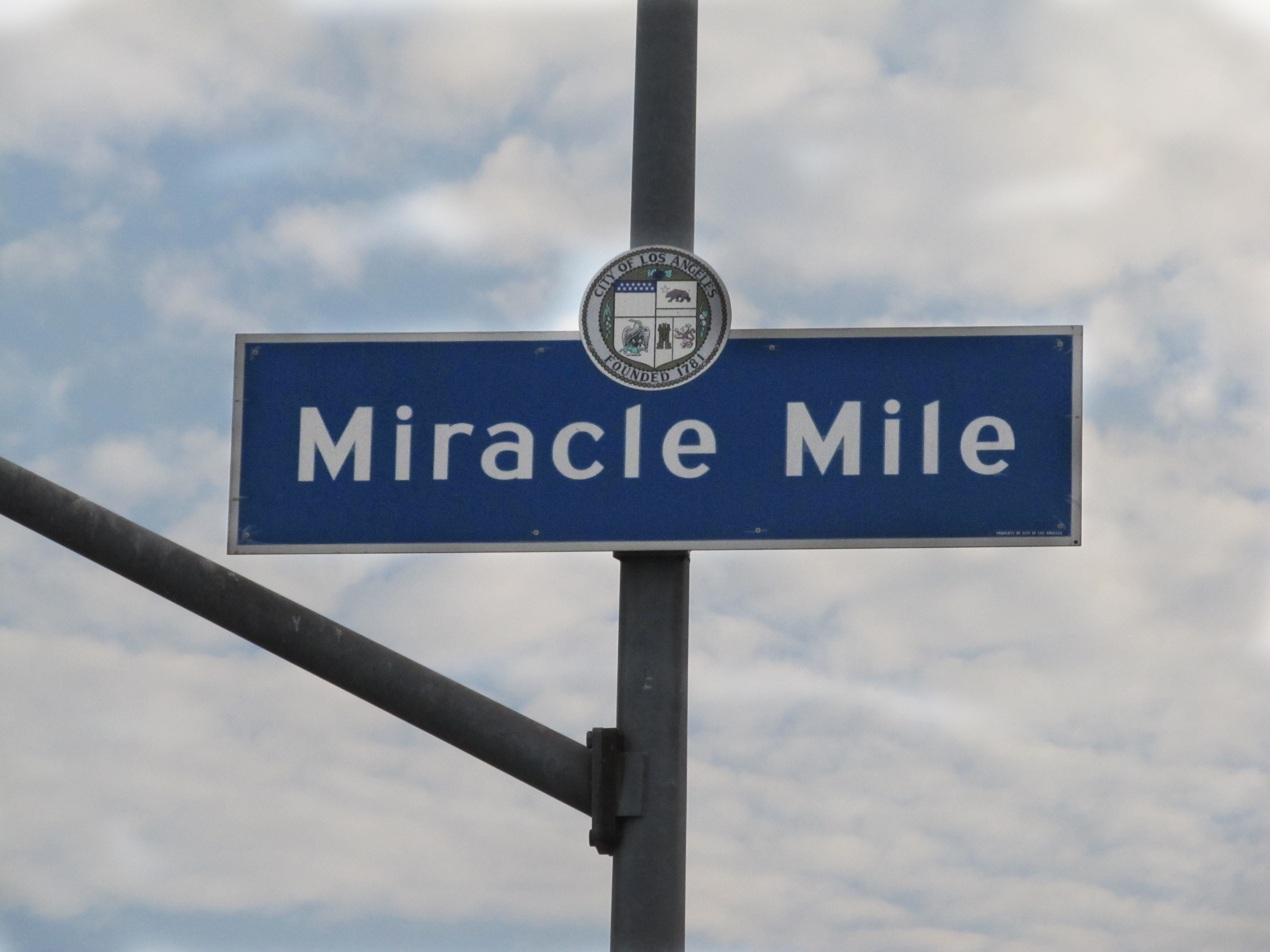
- Miracle Mile Neighborhood sign located at the intersection of San Vicente Boulevard & Hauser Boulevard

- Location within Los Angeles
- Coordinates: 34°03′35″N 118°20′57″W
- Country: United States of America
- State: California
- County: Los Angeles
- Time zone: Pacific
- Zip Code: 90036, 90019
- Area code: 323

Miracle Mile is a neighborhood in the city of Los Angeles, California.

It contains a stretch of Wilshire Boulevard known as Museum Row. It also contains two Historic Preservation Overlay Zones: the Miracle Mile HPOZ and the Miracle Mile North HPOZ.

== Geography ==
Miracle Mile's boundaries are roughly 3rd Street on the north, Highland Avenue on the east, San Vicente Boulevard on the south, and Fairfax Avenue on the west. Major thoroughfares include Wilshire and Olympic boulevards, La Brea and Fairfax avenues, and 6th Street.

Google Maps identifies an irregularly shaped area labeled "Miracle Mile" that runs from Ogden Drive on the west to Citrus Avenue and La Brea Avenue on the east. The area is roughly bordered on the north by 4th Street and on the south by 12th Street.

== History ==
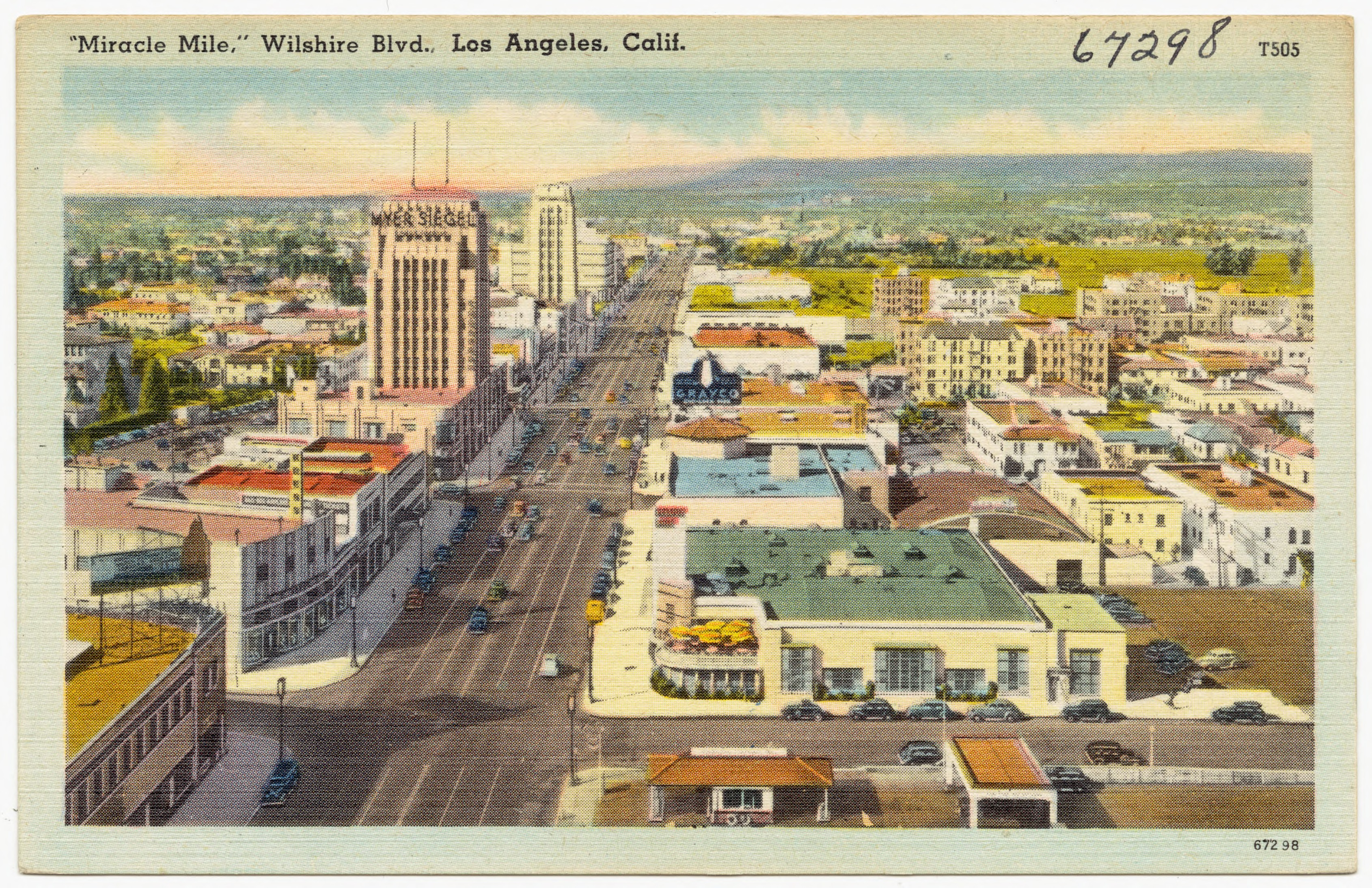
Postcard, circa 1930 to 1945

In the early 1920s, Wilshire Boulevard west of Western Avenue was an unpaved farm road, extending through dairy farms and bean fields. Developer A. W. Ross saw potential for the area and developed Wilshire as a commercial district to rival downtown Los Angeles. The "Miracle Mile" nickname first appeared in local newspapers on January 27, 1929.

The Miracle Mile development was initially anchored by the May Company Department Store with its landmark 1939 Streamline Moderne building on the west and the E. Clem Wilson Building on the east, then Los Angeles's tallest commercial building. The Wilson Building had a dirigible mast on top and was home to a number of businesses and professionals relocating from downtown. The success of the new alternative commercial and shopping district negatively affected downtown real estate values, and triggered development of the multiple downtowns that characterize contemporary Los Angeles.

Ross's insight was that the form and scale of his Wilshire strip should attract and serve automobile traffic rather than pedestrian shoppers. He applied this design both to the street itself and to the buildings lining it. Ross gave Wilshire various "firsts," including dedicated left-turn lanes and timed traffic lights, the first in the United States. He also required merchants to provide automobile parking lots, all to aid traffic flow. Major retailers such as Desmond's, Silverwoods, May Co., Coulter's, Harris and Frank, Ohrbach's, Mullen & Bluett, Phelps-Terkel, Myer Siegel, and Seibu eventually spread down Wilshire Boulevard from Fairfax to La Brea. Ross ordered that all building facades along Wilshire be engineered so as to be best seen through a windshield. This meant larger, bolder, simpler signage and longer buildings in a larger scale. They also had to be oriented toward the boulevard and architectural ornamentation and massing must be perceptible at 30 MPH (50 km/h) instead of at walking speed. These building forms were driven by practical requirements but contributed to the stylistic language of Art Deco and Streamline Moderne.

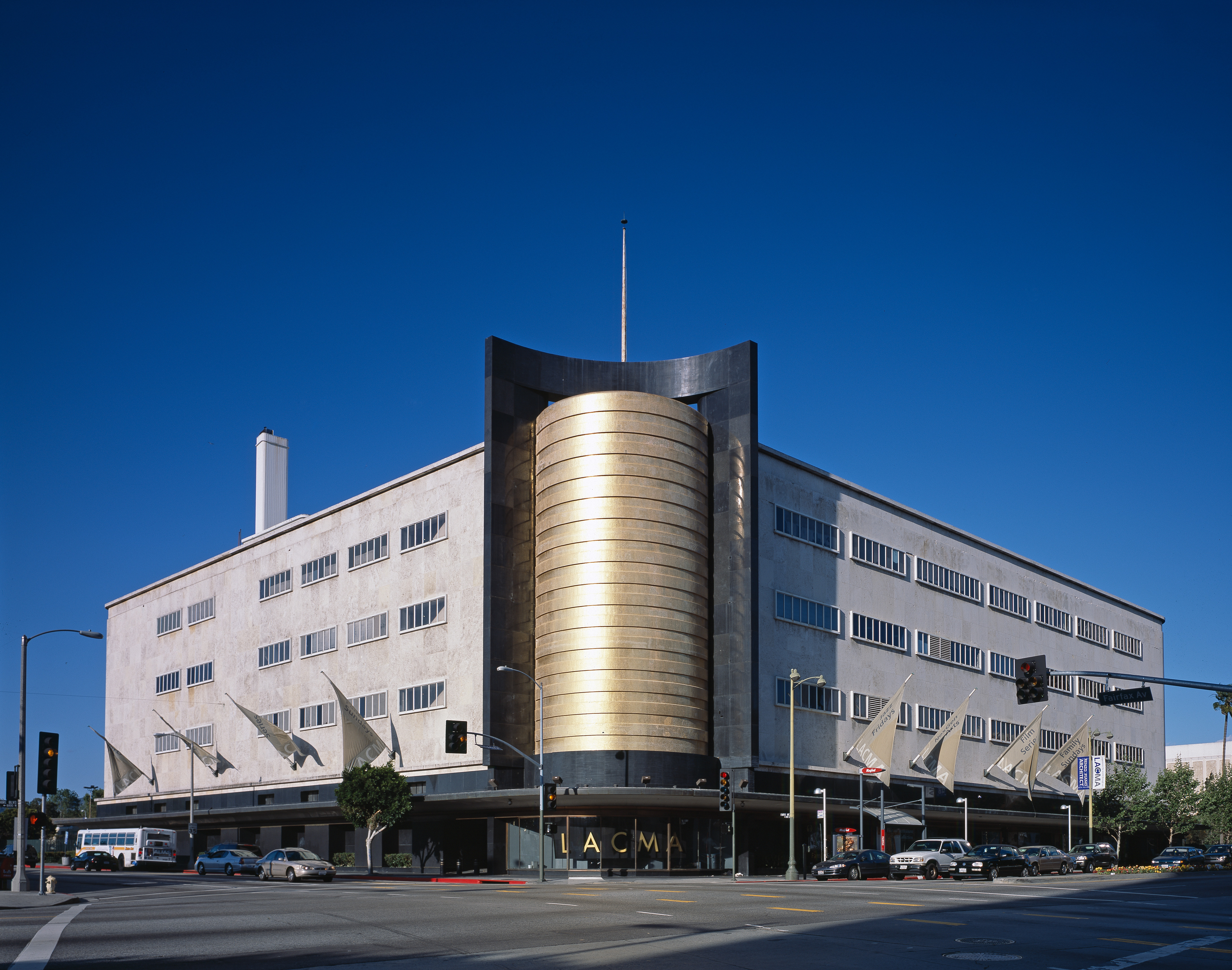
The 1939 Streamline Moderne May Company Building marks the western border of the Miracle Mile and "Museum Row".

Ross's moves were unprecedented, a huge commercial success, and proved historically influential. Ross had invented the car-oriented urban form — what Reyner Banham called "the linear downtown" model later adopted across the United States. The moves also contributed to Los Angeles's reputation as a city dominated by the car. A sculptural bust of Ross stands at 5800 Wilshire, with the inscription, "A. W. Ross, founder and developer of the Miracle Mile. Vision to see, wisdom to know, courage to do."

During Los Angeles' rapid growth in the early 20th century, Ross' parcel developed into a prominent commercial district. Dubbed the "Miracle Mile" due to its rapid commercial development, this stretch of Wilshire Boulevard near the La Brea Tar Pits was initially characterized by retail growth. Although the rise of suburban shopping malls and the mid-20th-century expansion of business districts in Downtown Los Angeles and Century City reduced its retail concentration, the area subsequently re-established commercial activity through the development of cultural institutions and high-rise commercial structures.

The black and gold Deco Building in Art Deco style at 5209 Wilshire was built in 1929, and is listed on the National Register of Historic Places. It was designed by the architecture firm of Morgan, Walls & Clements, which also designed the Wiltern Theatre, the El Capitan Theatre, and other notable buildings in Los Angeles. (Note: According to historian David Leighton, of the Arizona Daily Star newspaper the Miracle Mile in Tucson, Arizona derives its name from Los Angeles' Miracle Mile.)

Wilshire Boulevard through Miracle Mile (Los Angeles)

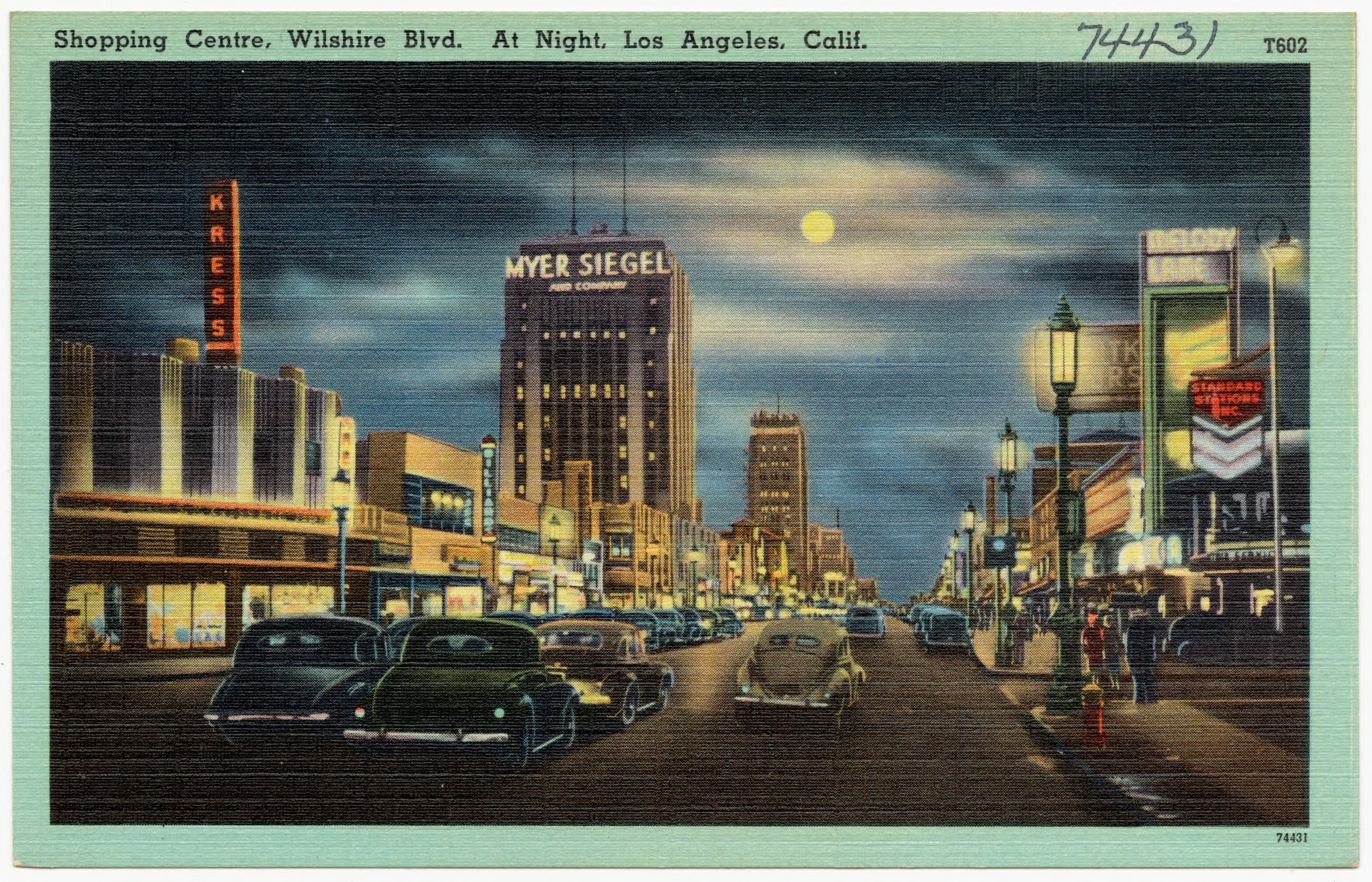
1930s/1940s

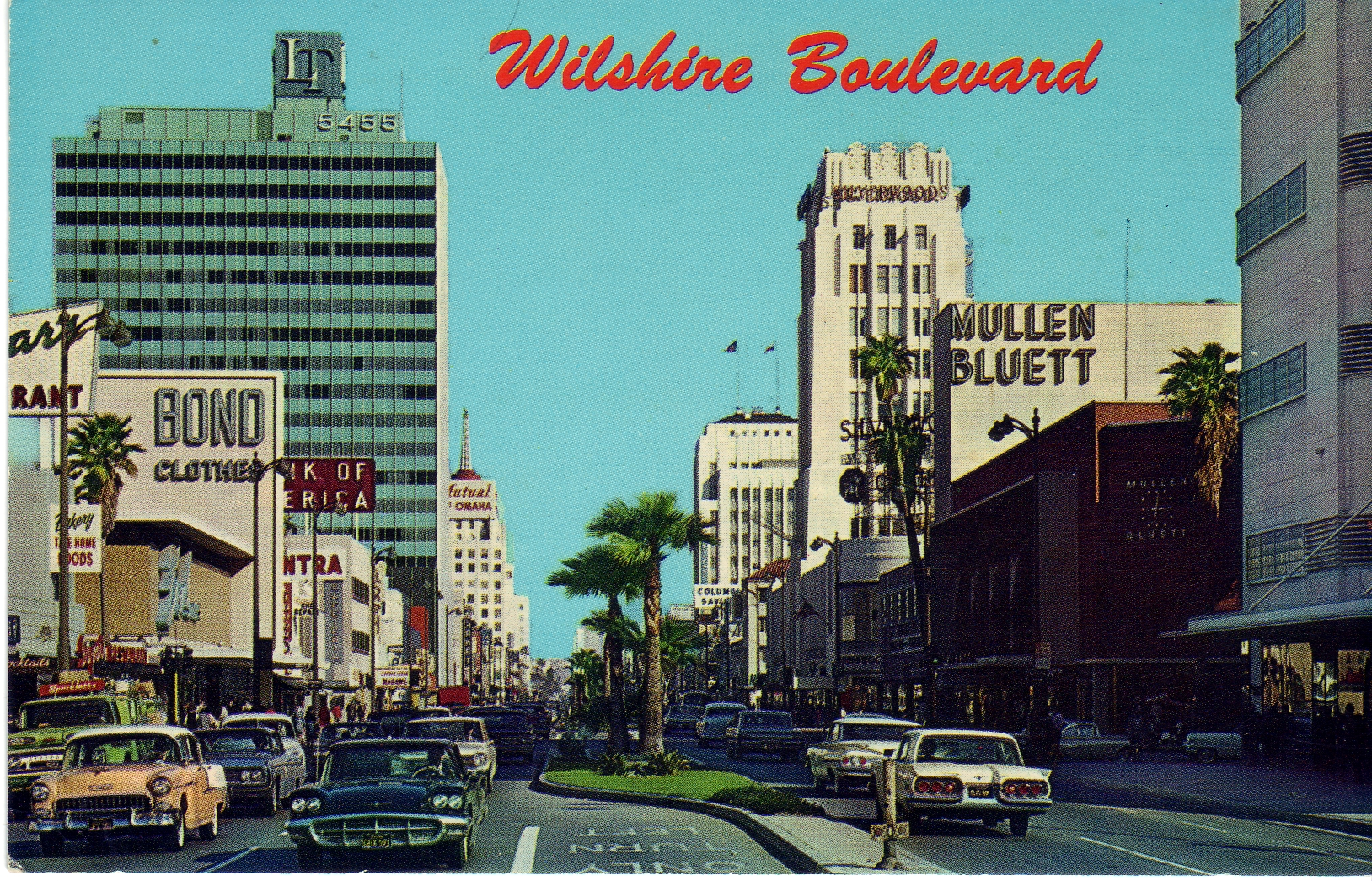
1960s

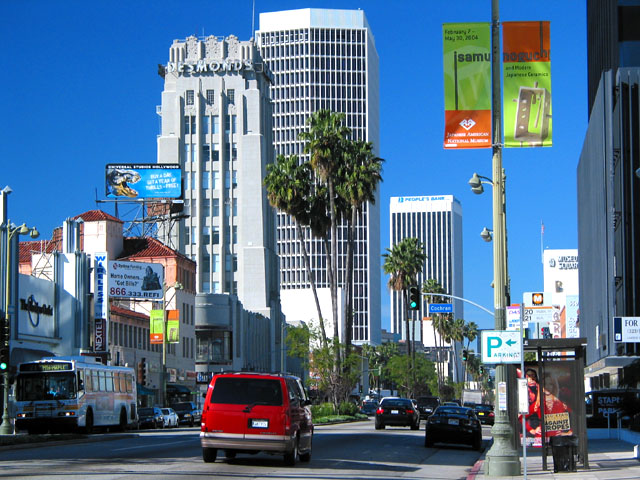
2000s

== Buildings ==
Landmark buildings past and present, as well as some of the well-known businesses lining Wilshire during its main period as a retail center of Los Angeles (1930s–1960s). Architects: MWC = Morgan, Walls, & Clements, WB = Welton Becket & Associates Styles: AD = Art Deco, Ch = Churrigueresque, ︎SCR = Spanish Colonial Revival, SM = Streamline Moderne Italics indicate demolished buildings.

6100 Thrifty Drug Stores	W I L S H I R E	6101 Johnie's Coffee Shop
FAIRFAX	W I L S H I R E	AVENUE
6060 Seibu Department Stores (1960s, Welton Becket) then 2nd home of Ohrbach's Wilshire. Now Petersen Automotive Museum.	W I L S H I R E	6067 May Company (1940, Albert C. Martin Sr. and S. A. Marx, SM): Now Saban Bldg home to Academy Museum of Motion Pictures (renovations –2021: Renzo Piano)
ORANGE GROVE AV.	W I L S H I R E	6067 May Company (1940, Albert C. Martin Sr. and S. A. Marx, SM): Now Saban Bldg home to Academy Museum of Motion Pictures (renovations –2021: Renzo Piano)
5900 Wilshire (1971)	W I L S H I R E	5905 Los Angeles County Museum of Art (LACMA); Broad Contemporary Art Museum at LACMA Resnick Pavilion (2006–10, Renzo Piano)︎
OGDEN DR.	W I L S H I R E	5905 Los Angeles County Museum of Art (LACMA); Broad Contemporary Art Museum at LACMA Resnick Pavilion (2006–10, Renzo Piano)︎
SPAULDING AV.	W I L S H I R E	5905 Los Angeles County Museum of Art (LACMA); Broad Contemporary Art Museum at LACMA Resnick Pavilion (2006–10, Renzo Piano)︎
LACMA David Geffen Gallery (spans Wilshire, under construction, Peter Zumthor, arch.)
Former buildings here: 5840 Mandel's Fascinating Slippers (1927–9, Spanish Colonial Revival); 5814 Craft Contemporary museum (1930, Gilbert Stanley Underwood); 5800 Jack White insurance agency, later Craft and Folk Art Museum		LACMA Buildings replaced: LACMA Main buildings, 1964, Pereira & Assoc. LACMA 1984–6 addition, Hardy, Holzman & Pfeiffer
STANLEY AV.	W I L S H I R E B O U L E V A R D	
5780 Citizens Nat'l Bank	W I L S H I R E B O U L E V A R D	5801 La Brea Tar Pits & George C. Page Museum (1976, Thornton and Fagan)
CURSON	W I L S H I R E B O U L E V A R D	STREET
	W I L S H I R E B O U L E V A R D	5757 Prudential Bldg. (Welton Becket & William Wurdeman) (1st home of Ohrbach's Wilshire) renamed Museum Square now home to SAG-AFTRA
MASSELIN	W I L S H I R E B O U L E V A R D	AVENUE
5656 Donavan & Seamans jewelers ︎	W I L S H I R E B O U L E V A R D	5665 Van de Kamp's Coffee Shop and Restaurant; Wilshire Bowl (1935, Max Maltzman, AD)
HAUSER	W I L S H I R E B O U L E V A R D	BOULEVARD
5600 Coulter's (1938, Stiles O. Clements, MWC, Streamline Moderne, demolished) later The Broadway (1960–1980). Replaced by mixed-use building.	W I L S H I R E B O U L E V A R D	5615–23 Ralph's (1927–8, MWC, SCR/Ch); 5601 Du-Par's
RIDGELEY	W I L S H I R E B O U L E V A R D	DRIVE
5570 Mullen & Bluett (1948, Stiles O. Clements, MWC); 5550 Phelps-Terkel (1936, MWC, demolished); Replaced by mixed-use building.	W I L S H I R E B O U L E V A R D	5575 Bond Stores (1956, Stiles O. Clements, architect, Burke, Kober & Nicolais, interiors), later Adray's appliances 5571 Nahan & Robinson Shoes, 20th Century Toyland, Barton's Candies
BURNSIDE	W I L S H I R E B O U L E V A R D	AVENUE
Wilshire Tower Bldg. (1928–9, Gilbert Stanley Underwood, Art Deco): 5522 Silverwoods, 5500 Desmond's. Now ACE Gallery et al.	W I L S H I R E B O U L E V A R D	5515 El Rey Theatre (Los Angeles) (1936, Clifford Balch, Zigzag/Streamline Moderne); 5501 Bank of America, Dodger Museum (1958-?)
DUNSMUIR	W I L S H I R E B O U L E V A R D	AVENUE
5474 Celes'; 5464 Disco Drug; 5464 commercial bldg (1927, Frank M. Tyler, AD); 5450 Brooks Clothing (1936), rebranded Harris & Frank in 1947	W I L S H I R E B O U L E V A R D	5475 Jekyll's; 5471 Fabrics, Inc. (1952–?); 5467 Zachary All clothing, now Walgreens
COCHRAN	W I L S H I R E B O U L E V A R D	AVENUE
Dominguez–Wilshire Bldg (1931, MWC):'5416 Weatherby-Kayser shoes 5404 C. H. Baker shoes 5400 Myer Siegel	W I L S H I R E B O U L E V A R D	5415 A&P Food Palace, later Clover Mart; 5413 Roman's Food Mart (c.1935, SM); 5403 Fabrics, Inc. ( –1952); 5401 Jack's appliances Sontag Drugs; NW corner Chandlers Shoes (c.1938, Marcus P. Miller)
CLOVERDALE	W I L S H I R E B O U L E V A R D	AVENUE
5370 The Dark Room (1935, Marcus P. Miller, Programmatic (novelty) architecture)	W I L S H I R E B O U L E V A R D	5361 Staber Salon
DETROIT	W I L S H I R E B O U L E V A R D	STREET
5324 New York Hat Store	W I L S H I R E B O U L E V A R D	5301 McDonnell's restaurant
LA BREA	W I L S H I R E B O U L E V A R D	AVENUE
5214 Fox Ritz Theatre	W I L S H I R E B O U L E V A R D	5207–9 Security-First Natl Bank (1929, MWC) now The Deco Bldg

== Museum Row ==
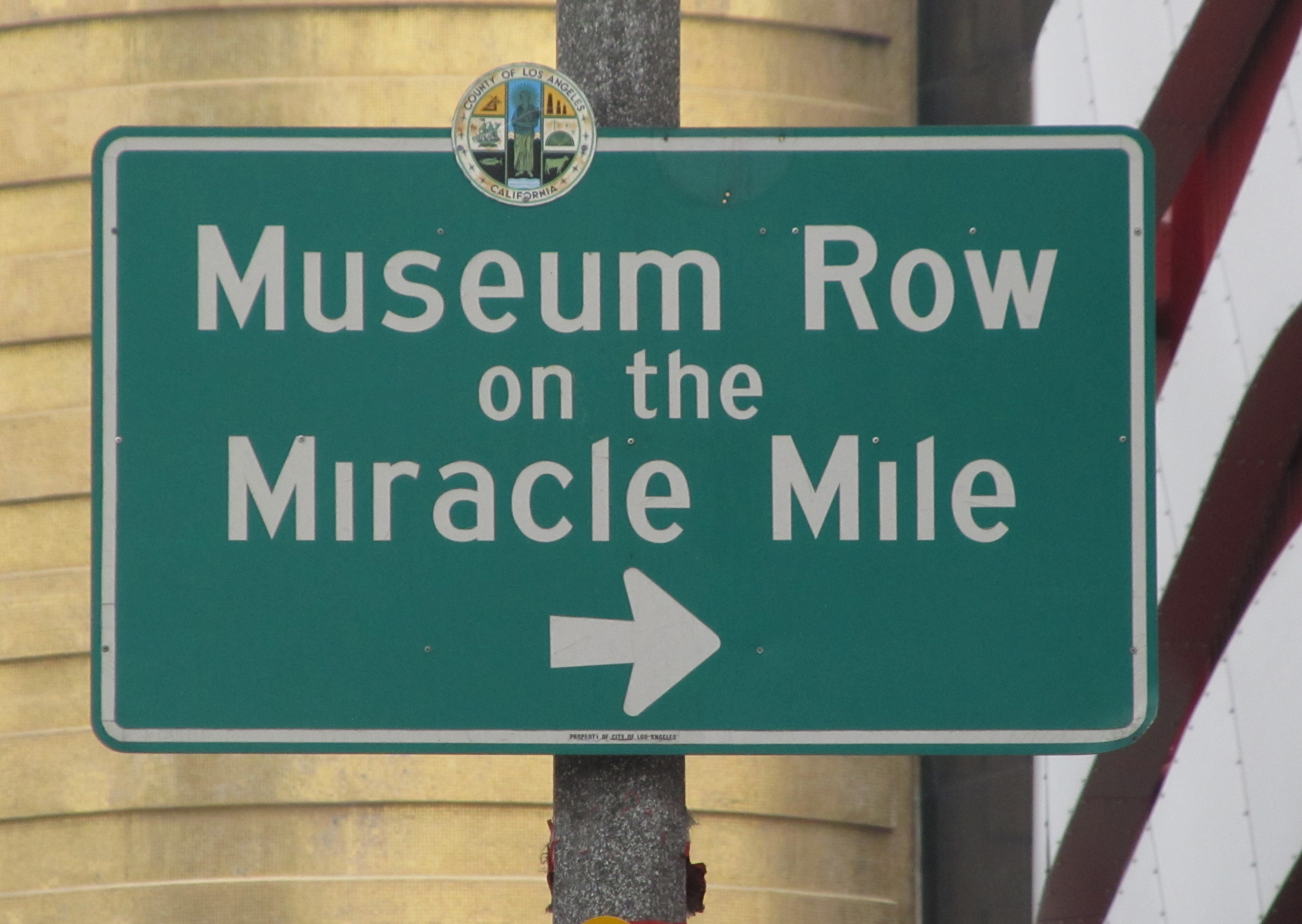
Museum Row sign at Fairfax Av. and Wilshire Blvd.

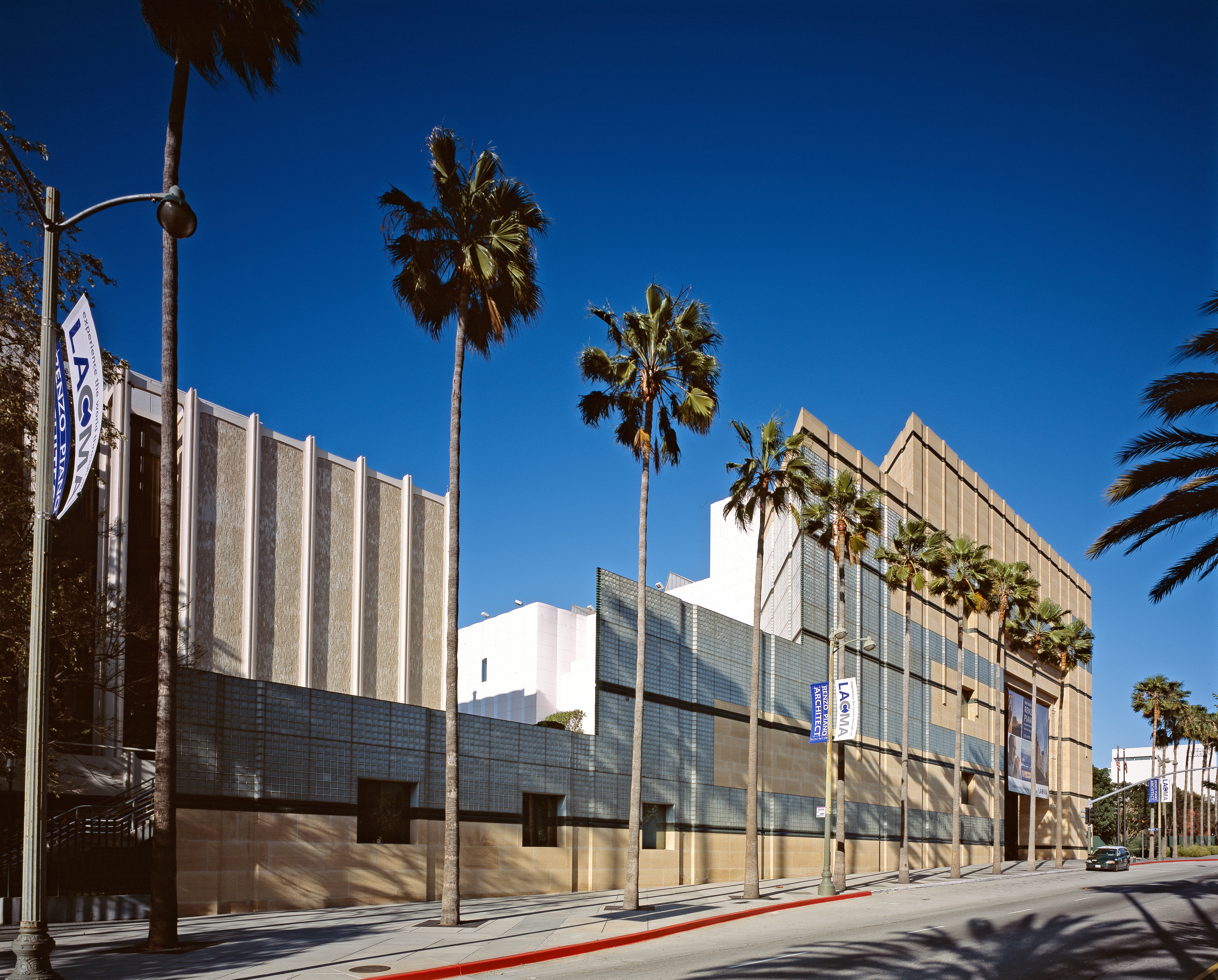
The Los Angeles County Museum of Art

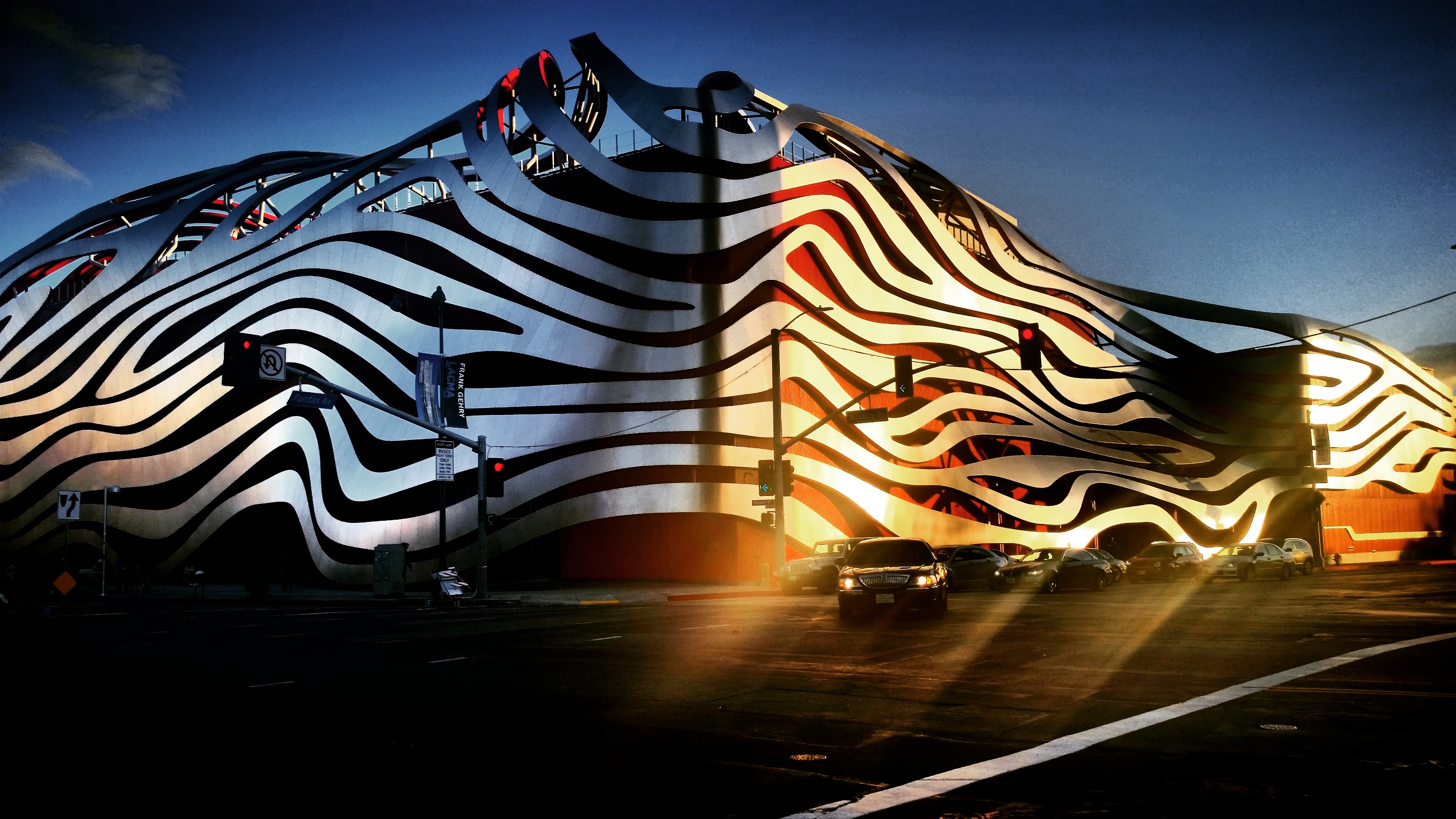
The Petersen Automotive Museum on Wilshire Blvd.

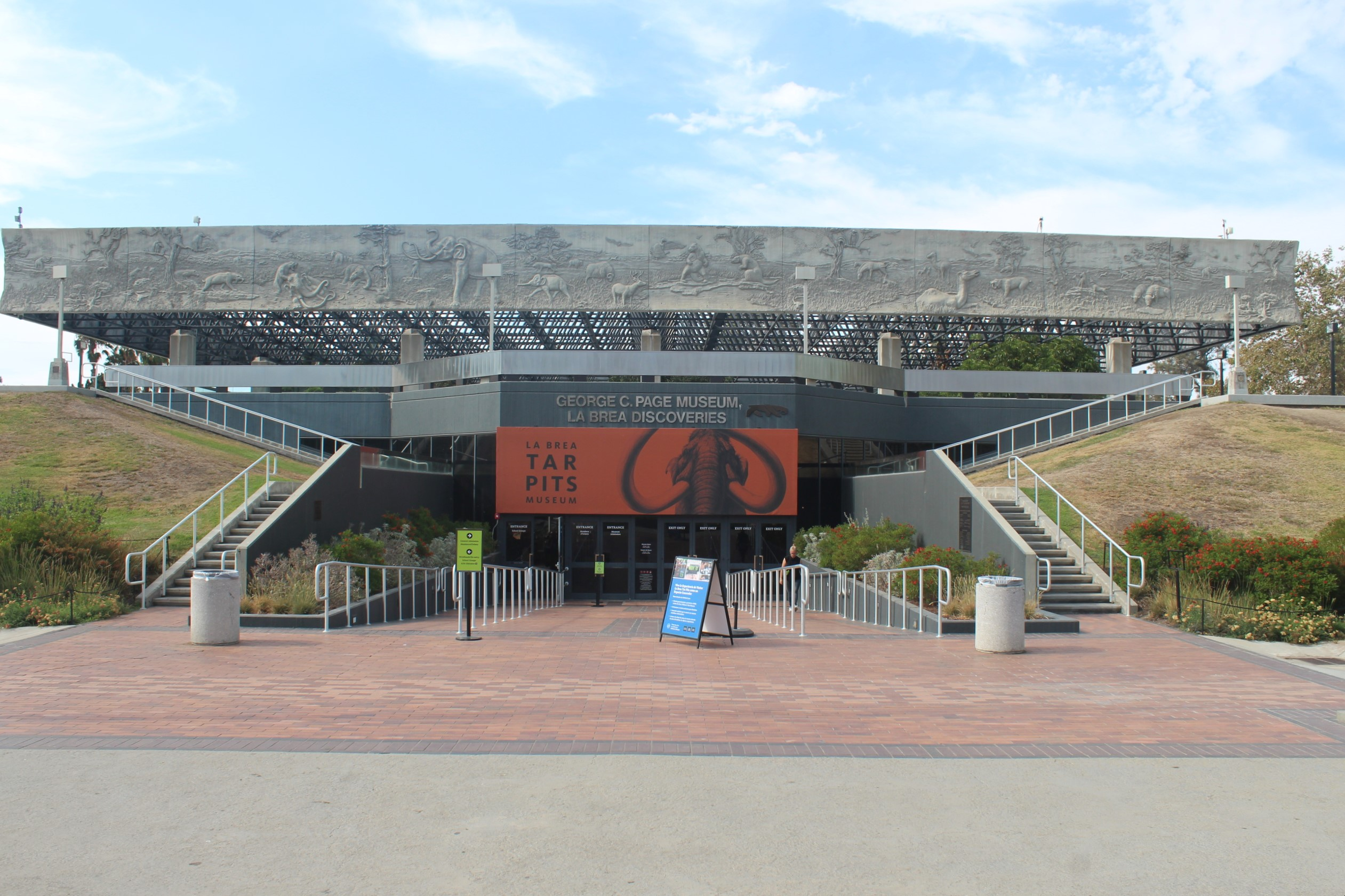
The George C. Page Museum

The Los Angeles County Museum of Art (LACMA), The Petersen Automotive Museum, Craft Contemporary, George C. Page Museum, and La Brea Tar Pits pavilions, among others, create "Museum Row" on the Miracle Mile.

The Academy Museum of Motion Pictures for the Academy of Motion Picture Arts and Sciences, designed by Renzo Piano, is located in the former May Company Department Store on the corner of Wilshire Boulevard and Fairfax Avenue. A new contemporary structure for the museum's theaters is located behind the building.

== Historic Preservation Overlay Zones ==
Miracle Mile contains two Historic Preservation Overlay Zones.

The Miracle Mile HPOZ comprises 1,347 properties. Its boundaries are Wilshire Boulevard to the north, San Vicente Boulevard to the south, La Brea Avenue to the east, and Orange Grove Avenue to the west. It is located in the city's Wilshire community plan area.

The Miracle Mile North HPOZ primarily consists of single-family residences which are uniform in scale, massing and setbacks, the majority of which were built from 1924 to 1941. Its boundaries are Gardner and Detroit streets, between Beverly Boulevard and Third Street. It is located in the city's Wilshire community plan area.

== Transportation ==
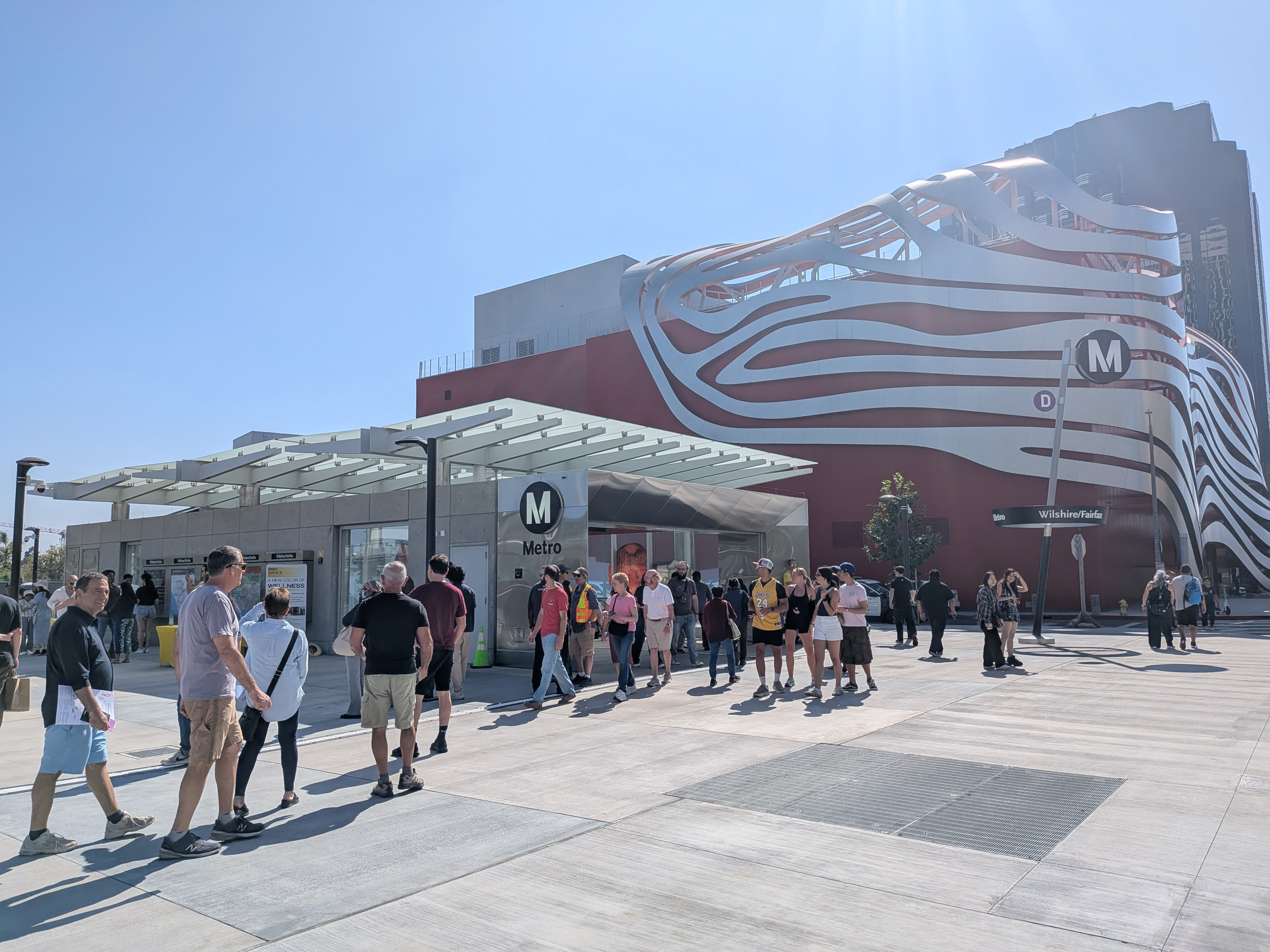
Entrance of the Wilshire/Fairfax station with the Petersen Automotive Museum in the background.

Los Angeles Metro's D Line subway serves the Miracle Mile at Wilshire/La Brea station and Wilshire/Fairfax station. The line is currently being extended along Wilshire Boulevard past the Miracle Mile through Beverly Hills, Century City and Westwood.

In 1985, A federal ban on tunneling operations in the area was passed at the behest of the district's congressional representative Henry Waxman after an explosion, caused by the buildup of methane seeping up through the district's long-depleted oil wells, destroyed a department store. The ban was implemented despite the fact that methane deposits abound in most of Los Angeles. In late 2005, the ban was overturned, owing to tunneling techniques that make it possible to mitigate the methane concern. A westerly extension of the subway was then supported by many civic officials in Los Angeles, Beverly Hills, and Santa Monica, the three cities through which the proposed extension runs. In early 2008, the project—which is destined to terminate in Santa Monica—received $5 billion in federal funds. In late 2008, Measure R passed, releasing $10 billion in reserve funds to start work on public transit projects in Los Angeles County. Service to three new stations at La Brea, Fairfax and La Cienega began on May 8, 2026 as part of phase one of the D Line extension.

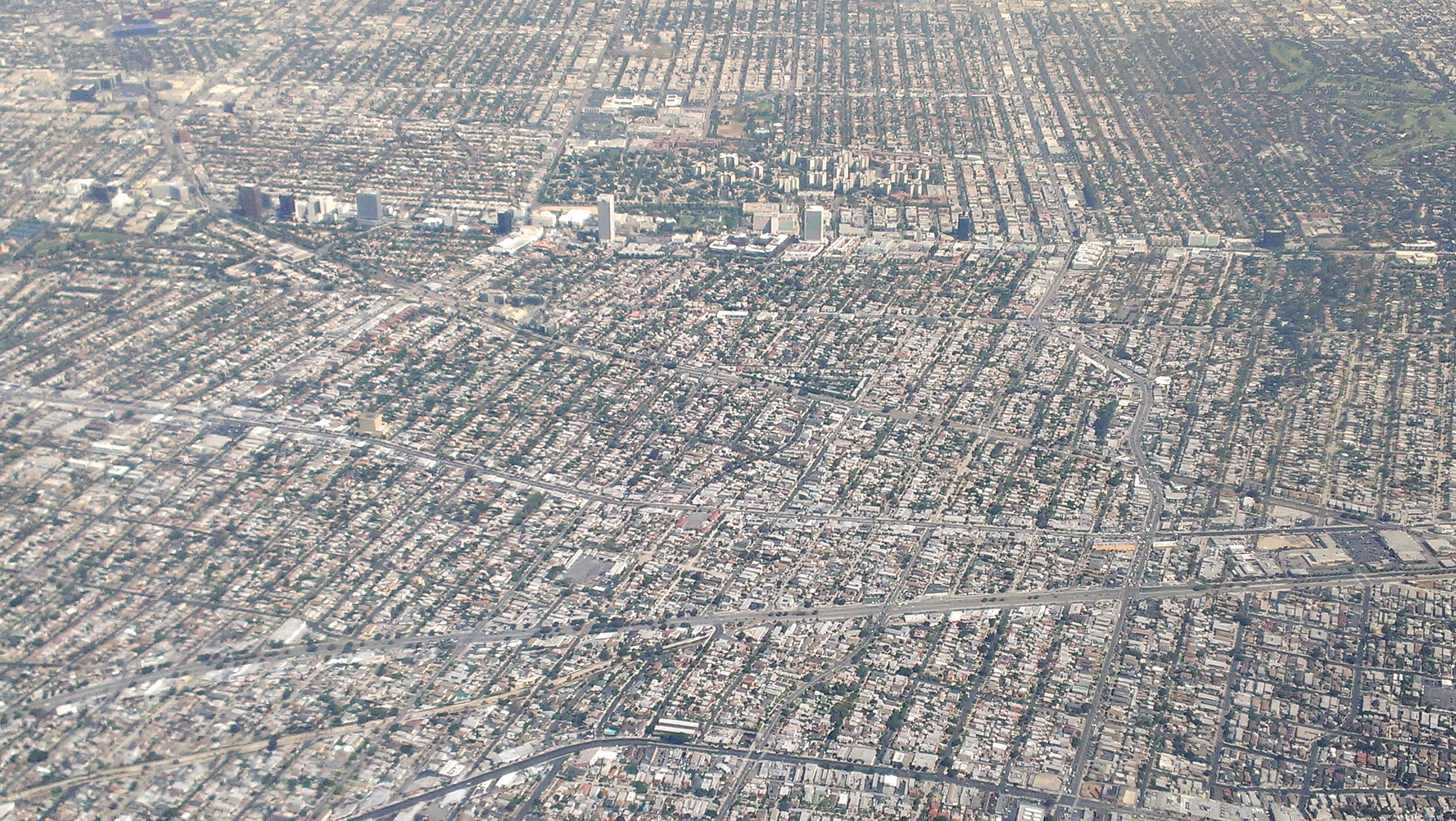
Miracle Mile viewed from south. Wilshire Blvd. runs left-to-right, lined with tall buildings.

== Education ==
The area is within the Los Angeles Unified School District, Board District 4.

== Landmarks ==
Landmarks include The Los Angeles County Museum of Art, the Petersen Automotive Museum, SAG-AFTRA, the El Rey Theatre, La Brea Tar Pits, Park La Brea Apartments, 5900 Wilshire, Ace Gallery, the Zachary All building (5467), the Olympia Medical Center, and the Academy Museum of Motion Pictures. Johnie's Coffee Shop is leased mostly for filmmaking, but was also utilized as the west coast campaign office for Bernie Sanders presidential campaign, 2016. At the border on the Northwest corner is the Writers Guild of America, West, and at the border on the North is the Farmers Market, and The Grove, followed by Pan-Pacific Park.

== See also ==
- Harold A. Henry, president, Los Angeles City Council
- Ace Gallery
