= Phelps-Terkel =

Defunct men's clothing store based in Los Angeles

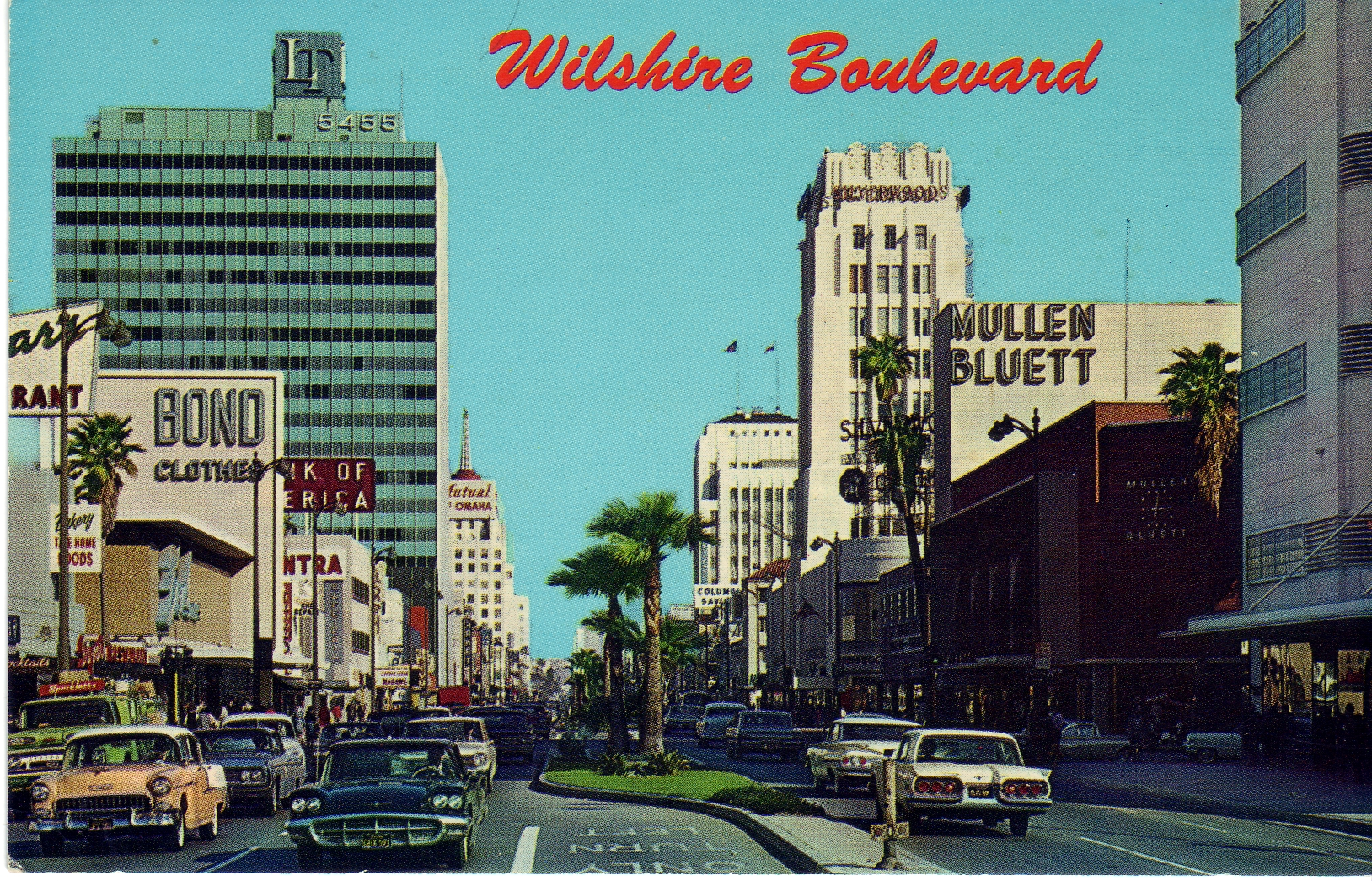
Miracle Mile during the 1960s. Phelps-Terkel store is visible on the right between the Silverwoods and Mullen & Bluett stores

Phelps-Terkel was a Los Angeles based department store specializing in men's clothing.

The store was founded by Richard (Dick) B. Terkel and David S. Phelps in 1923. Dick Terkel, a haberdasher, hailed from Wisconsin and moved to Berkeley then Los Angeles. He played banjo and led a band. He rented half of his store at the entrance to the University of Southern California (USC) to David Phelps, musician, who sold music there.

On September 15, 1926, the retailer opened a store in Palo Alto, California near Stanford University at 524 Ramona Street. Later it would operate at 219 University Avenue.

Its 1936 Miracle Mile, Los Angeles Modernist store at 5550 Wilshire Boulevard, corner of S. Burnside Avenue, designed by Morgan, Walls and Clements and shared with Desmond's department store and other tenants. The Los Angeles Conservancy remarked that together with its neighbor Mullen and Bluett, the stores "helped secure the Miracle Mile's reputation as a shopper's paradise".

In 1949 it opened a store in North Hollywood on Lankershim Boulevard, and 4 years later on December 7, 1953, it opened a new store next door to the old one, twice as large.

In mid-1953 the retailer opened a store at 512 Wilshire Boulevard in Santa Monica. Later that year, they opened a new USC store at 3406 S. Hoover Street to replace its original store, which the university needed in order to expand.

In 1965 the firm became part of Phelps-Wilger chain, based at 10924 Weyburn Avenue in Westwood Village; together the new chain had stores in:

- Miracle Mile, 5550 Wilshire Blvd., later Phelps-Meager, closed c.1976
- Pasadena, 422 S. Lake, later Phelps, closed c.1979
- Westwood Village
- Sherman Oaks Fashion Square - later Phelps-La Crosse, closed c.1982
- Newport Beach (Fashion Island) - store was to open in 1965. Closed after 1987.

There was at one time also a store in Lakewood Center. Tom Selleck was once a salesclerk at the Sherman Oaks store. In its final years, Phelps-Wilger was renamed Phelps, and closed in 1992.
