= Montclair Place (California) =

Shopping mall in Montclair, California

- Location: Montclair, California, United States
- Coordinates: 34.0867°N 117.6936°W
- Address: 5060 E. Montclair Plaza Ln
- Opened: November 3, 1968
- Developer: The Hahn Company
- Manager: CIM Group
- Owner: CIM Group
- Num. of stores: 132
- Num. of anchor tenants: 3
- Floor area: 1,200,000 sq ft (110,000 m^{2})
- Floors: 2 (3 in former Sears)
- Website: montclairplace.com

Montclair Place is a 1,200,000 square feet (110,000 m^{2}) indoor shopping mall in Montclair, California. The mall was known as Montclair Plaza until 2015. The mall features JCPenney, and Macy's, in addition to an AMC DINE-IN Theatre.

== History ==
=== At opening ===
The mall opened on November 5, 1968, at a cost of $50 million, with 69 stores on a single level, representing over 600,000 square feet (56,000 m^{2}) of retail space, on a lot of 120 acres (49 ha) with parking space for 6,000 cars. Montclair Plaza was developed by contractor Ernest W. Hahn; the architect of the overall mall and shops was Burke, Kober, Nicolais & Archuleta. Three department stores anchored Montclair Plaza at, or shortly after its opening:

- JCPenney, 189,000 square feet (17,600 m^{2}); Burke, Kober, Nicolais & Archuleta, architects
- The Broadway at the east end, 142,000 square feet (13,200 m^{2}); Charles Luckman and Associates, architects
- May Company at the west end, 150,000 square feet (14,000 m^{2}); Welton Becket and Associates, architects

Other stores open at the Plaza's launch included branches of the junior department stores:

- Silverwoods (Burke, Kober, Nicolais & Archuleta, architects), as part of an expansion at the time that also included stores Las Vegas, La Habra Fashion Square, and Palm Springs.
- Mullen & Bluett

There was a General Cinemas theater complex.

A United California Bank, Crocker Bank, Van de Kamp's Holland Dutch Bakery, drugstore, and supermarket were located across from the mall in a 77,400-square-foot (7,190 m^{2}) strip mall on the northeast of the property.

=== Later development ===
The mall was renovated and expanded with a second level that opened on October 30, 1985. Sears was added to the mall the same year, which relocated from the Indian Hill Mall. The first Nordstrom store in San Bernardino County opened at the Montclair Plaza on May 2, 1986. May Company was converted to Robinsons-May in 1993. The Broadway became a Macy's in 1996. Macy's relocated to the Robinsons-May space in 2006 after the chains merged.

In February 2014, CIM Group acquired the mall.

In November 2015, the mall was renamed "Montclair Place" and renovations were announced. On March 1, 2018, AMC DINE-IN Theatre announced that it will replace the Broadway building with a new 55,000-square-foot dine-in movie theatre, the city's first indoor theatre in nearly twenty years. Multiple new stores were added, including Forever 21 and Spectrum. Kids Empire, an 11,000-square-foot indoor playground was added. A Lazy Dog Restaurant & Bar opened in December 2019 in the former Goodyear Tire and Rubber Company. A WinWings restaurant opened next to the Panda Express restaurant.

The original Broadway outpost was razed for an AMC Theatres which opened during 2021.

The dawn of the early 2020s saw several storied traditional department store retailers update its brick-and-mortar formats after being encroached upon to a degree by several digital retailers in recent years in addition to the COVID pandemic.

On November 7, 2019, it was announced Sears would shutter as part of an ongoing decision to eliminate its traditional brick-and-mortar format.

On May 7, 2020, Nordstrom, which also maintains several additional outposts nearby, announced plans to shutter along with several additional locations as a direct result of pulling back because of the COVID-19 pandemic. Both the previous Sears and Nordstrom outposts are being considered for a future enhanced development expected to take place soon.

Main Event, which opened in January 2025, is a family entertainment center offering a variety of attractions, including bowling, laser tag, virtual reality experiences, and arcade games. The venue also features a full-service restaurant and bar, providing dining and beverage options for guests. Other recently opened tenants include Pandora, Miniso, Two Hands Fresh Corn Dogs and Charleys Cheesesteaks.

== Transit Connections ==
Metrolink has a station located two city blocks north of the mall at 5091 Richon Street, with connections to Foothill Transit, Omnitrans, and Riverside Transit Agency Express Line 204 buses. The mall is directly served by the Silver Streak bus rapid transit and Foothill Transit and Omnitrans buses.
