= 5900 Wilshire =

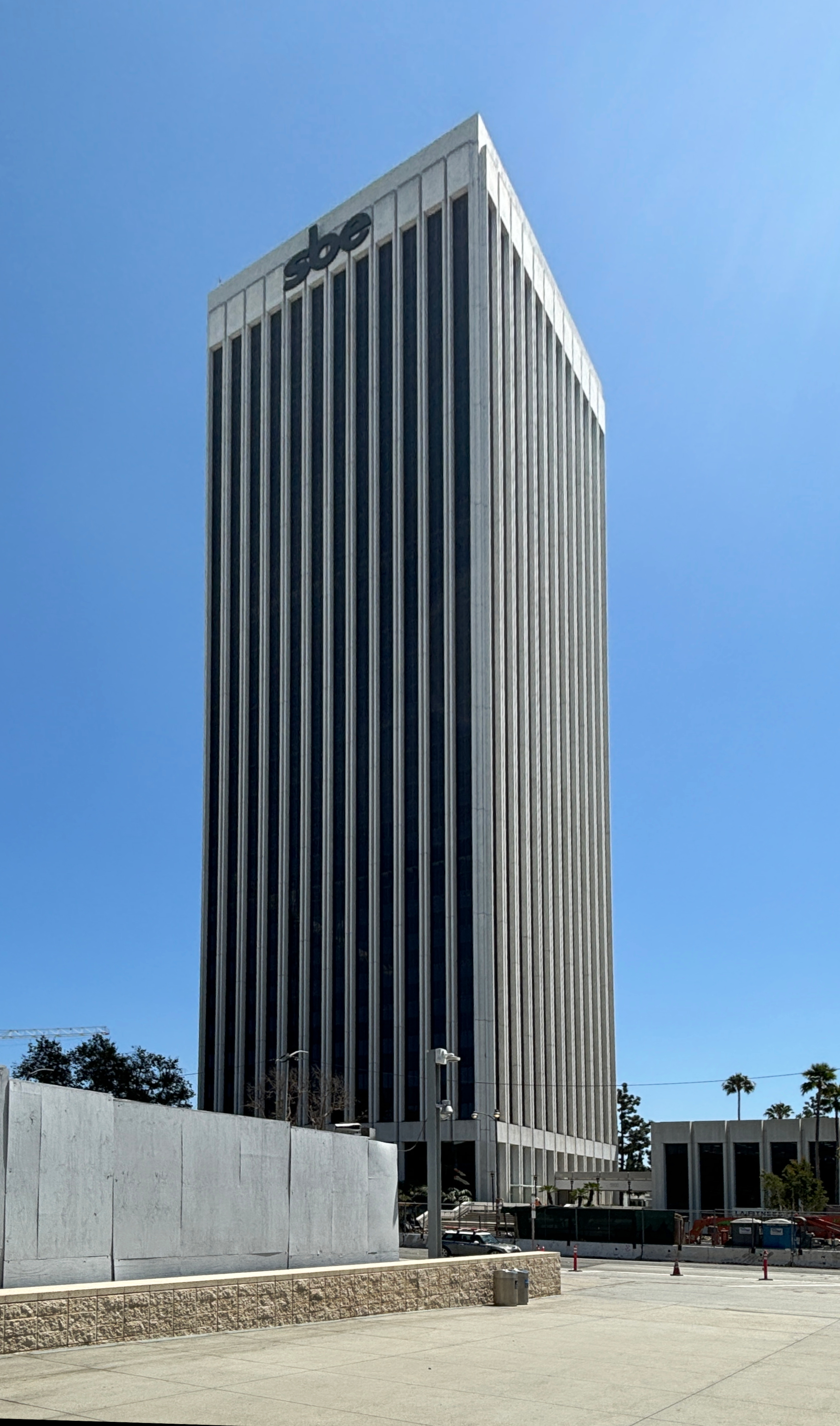
- (August 2024)
- Interactive map of the 5900 Wilshire area

General information
- Status: Completed
- Type: Commercial offices
- Architectural style: Modernism
- Location: 5900 Wilshire Boulevard; Los Angeles, California, U.S.
- Coordinates: 34.063699°N 118.358781°W
- Construction started: 1968
- Completed: 1971
- Owner: The Ratkovich Company

Height
- Roof: 135.18 m (443.5 ft)

Technical details
- Floor count: 32
- Floor area: 491,000 sq ft (45,600 m^{2})

Design and construction
- Architect: William L. Pereira & Associates

5900 Wilshire, known originally as the Mutual Benefit Life Building, is a 132-metre (433 ft), 32-story skyscraper completed in 1971 in Los Angeles, California, United States. It is the tallest building in the Miracle Mile district, the second-tallest in the Wilshire Area, and the 38th-tallest in Los Angeles. The international-style building was designed by architect Gin Wong of William L. Pereira & Associates. The building, which includes tenants occupying entire floors all the way down to executive suites, is across Wilshire Boulevard from the Los Angeles County Museum of Art. The Ratkovich Company spent $34 million on a renovation which began in 2005 and was still in process in the second quarter of 2008. The renovation included a new lobby. The placement of a bus zone across the street at LACMA and the subsequent removal of the crosswalk that would have fed traffic to a proposed cafe caused a rethinking of those plans. It was built for the Mutual Benefit Life by the Shorenstein Co. of San Francisco. The 491,000-square-foot (45,600 m^{2}) building was acquired by The Ratkovich Company in December 2005.

In December 2008, the building became the official west coast headquarters for the entertainment newspaper Variety. The newspaper's name adorned the top of the building's north face in red letters until late 2013.

In 2014, the building became the official west coast headquarters for SBE Entertainment Group. The company's logo is the current signage of the building.

== Berlin wall segments ==
In the building's front lawn is a memorial to the Berlin Wall, containing ten original segments. Together, they form the longest stretch of the Berlin Wall in the United States. The segments were installed in 2009 by the Wende Museum. The installation included temporarily walling Wilshire Boulevard in commemoration of the wall's removal.

== See also ==
- List of tallest buildings in Los Angeles
