= Adray's =

Two former California appliance and electronics retailers

Adray's (Orange)
- Industry: Retail
- Founded: 1967; 59 years ago
- Founders: Andy Adray; Eddie Aladray
- Defunct: December 1998
- Fate: Bankruptcy
- Headquarters: Orange, California, United States
- Number of locations: 1
- Key people: Lou Adray (owner and president)
- Number of employees: 30 (1997)

Adray's (Van Nuys)
- Industry: Retail
- Founded: 1976; 50 years ago
- Founder: Richard Adray
- Defunct: 1996
- Fate: All retail locations shut down
- Headquarters: Van Nuys, California, United States
- Number of locations: 10 (peak, summer 1996); 5 (at closure fall 1996)
- Key people: Isaac Hakim (CEO)
- Parent: Adry-Mart Inc. (1979–1996)

Adray's was the name of two appliance and electronics retailers, one a single store and the other a chain of stores, both based in Southern California. The independent store at 1809 W. Chapman Avenue in the City of Orange had been fully owned by Lou Adray since 1971 when he bought out its founders, his brother Andy and their cousin Eddie Aladray. This store was described by the Los Angeles Times at its closure in 1998 as an "institution". The separate store chain, also branded Adray's but incorporated as Adry-Mart Inc., was run by Lou Adray's relatives and operated up to 10 stores in Los Angeles and Ventura Counties.

== History ==
At one point in the late 1960s, there were four separate appliance and electronics retail operations named Adray's in the US, three in Southern California and one in Dearborn, Michigan, with each run by one of four brothers: Mike, Andy, Sam, and Lou Adray. The Michigan location, founded by Mike in 1955, was the first. In 1965, Andy Adray opened a store in Los Angeles and a year later Sam did the same in Van Nuys. A store in Orange was opened in 1967 and was initially owned by Andy and one of their cousins, Eddie Aladray. When Lou Adray moved to the area in 1968, he bought out Andy's ownership in the Orange location and in 1971 became the store's sole owner when he bought out Eddie's share.

The three California stores initially cooperated by combining their buying power with suppliers and accepting returns or exchanges for each others customers. However, Sam shut down his store in 1970 and Andy shut his in 1974 leaving Lou's store in Orange as the only Adray's in California.

This lasted for two years until 1976 when Lou helped Andy's son Richard open his own location, also called Adray's and also selling appliances and electronics, in Van Nuys. While Lou was not an owner in the new store, he provided Richard with credit guarantees as the operation got started.

In 1979, Richard sold his operation to a group of investors incorporated as Adry-Mart Inc. While the buyers had initially said they intended to stop using the name Adray's, the final contract with Richard gave them the rights to use that name in northern Los Angeles County and to the north.

Lou discovered that Adry-Mart intended to continue operating as Adray's only after the sale was final. This led to a lawsuit by Richard in 1987 accusing Adry-Mart of violating the terms of the contract by advertising in southern Los Angeles County. That suit was settled by 1990. In 1992, a suit between Lou and Adry-Mart was decided in favor of Adry-Mart but defined specific market areas for each operation with restrictions on advertisements outside those areas.

On appeal, the 1992 verdict was overturned in 1994 but retrial plans ended in 1997 when Adry-Mart and Lou Adray reached a settlement since Adry-Mart had shut down its retail business.

== Lou Adray–run store ==
Lou Adray, born Lottfie (orig. Lutfie) in 1933 in Dearborn, Michigan to parents that census records show as having come from "Syria" (at the time of immigration Syria included what is now Lebanon), and died in 2017 at his Anaheim Hills home.

Adray's (Orange) departments included major appliances, photographic, television and video, office equipment, stereos and housewares. It claimed to keep overhead to a minimum and minimized display space, providing them only for some televisions and major appliances. It closed abruptly in December 1998, due to bankruptcy. The Good Guys and Circuit City had opened competing locations in Orange by that time.

== Adry-Mart–run chain ==
Another Adray's store — in fact, a chain — was run by other members of the Adray family, including CEO Isaac Hakim in 1996. Van Nuys-Based Adry-Mart Inc. operated the "other" Adray's in Los Angeles and Ventura counties — an 18-year battle between two parts of the family. Locations of the Adry-Mart–run chain included Canoga Park, Lakewood, Torrance, Van Nuys, Ventura, at 5575 Wilshire Blvd. in the Miracle Mile, and 11201 W. Pico in West Los Angeles. The Adry-Mart–run chain closed 5 of its 10 stores in mid-1996, citing competition from the Good Guys and Circuit City, and shut down the remainder in the fall of 1996.

== Lawsuit ==
Lou Adray won the exclusive right to use the Adray's name when a suit with Adry-Mart was settled in 1997. As part of the settlement of lawsuit, Adray also acquired Adry-Mart's customer list.
