= Mullen & Bluett =

General information
- Location: Los Angeles, California

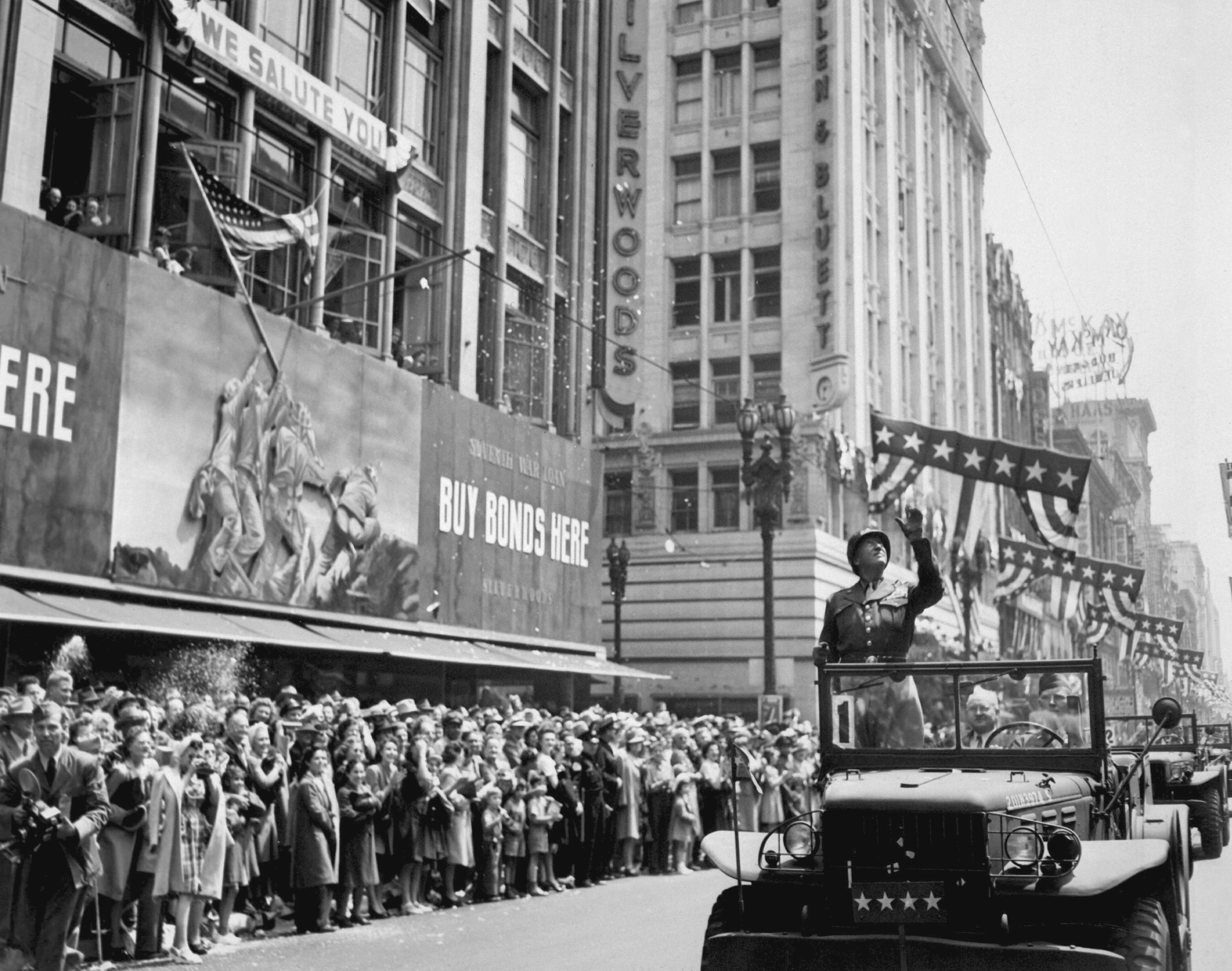
The Mullen & Bluett building is behind General George Patton in this photo from June 9, 1945.

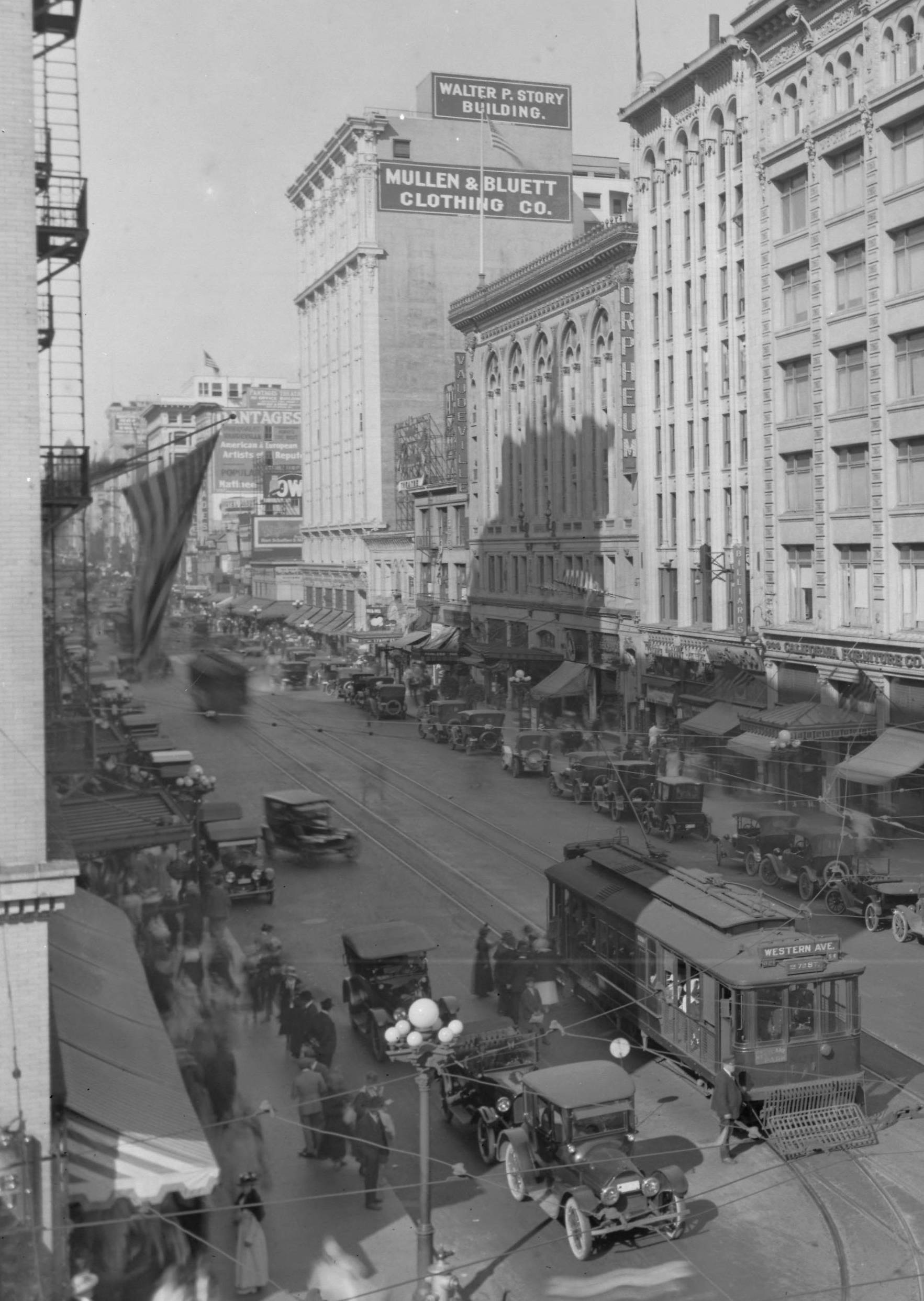
Broadway looking north from Seventh Street with view of Mullen & Bluett, 1923

Mullen & Bluett was a Los Angeles-based department store specializing in men's clothing.

== Founding ==
It was founded by Andrew Mullen and W. C. Bluett in the 1880s, at the corner of First and Spring streets in Downtown Los Angeles. Arthur R. Mullen took over management of the store after the death of the founders.

== Broadway store ==
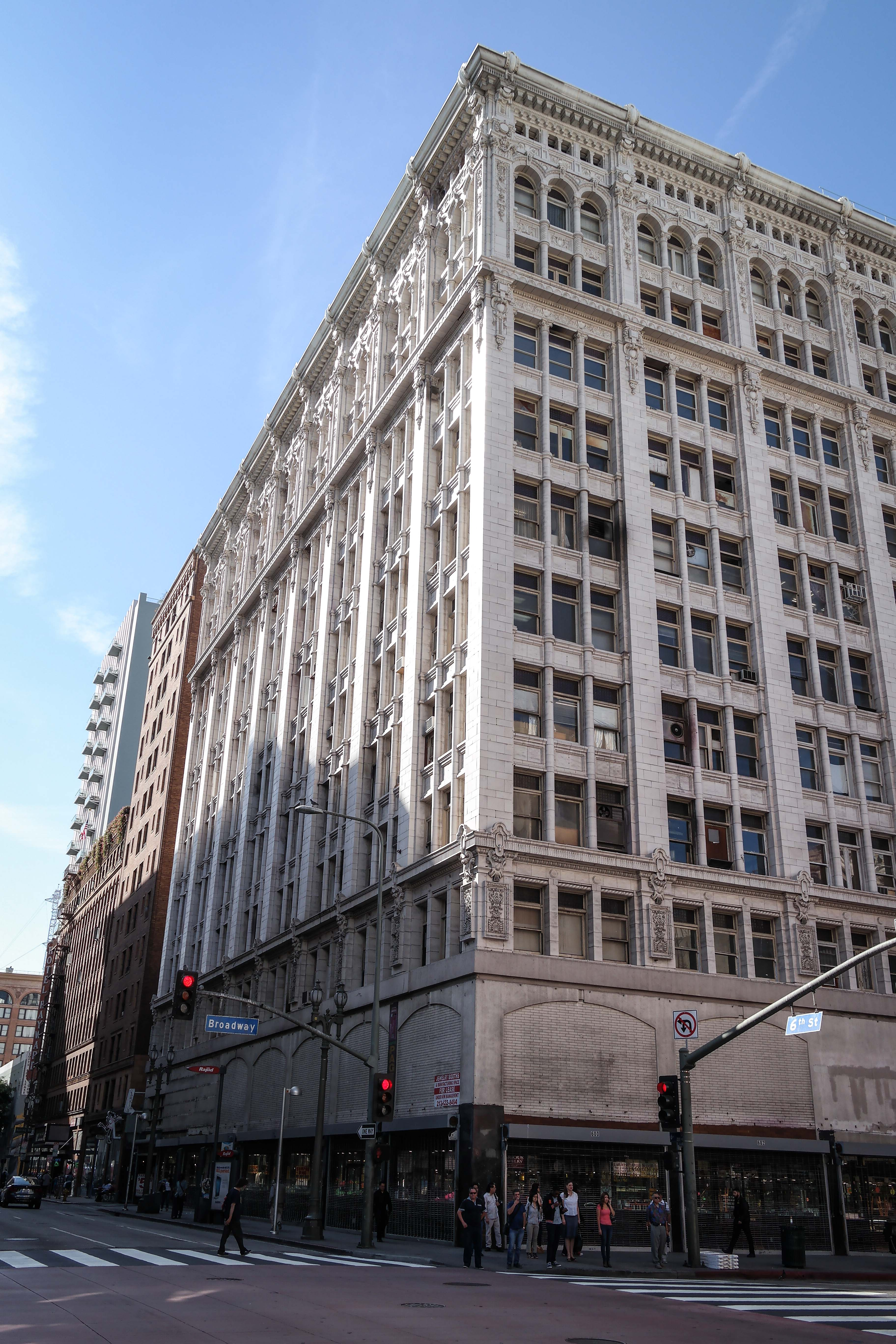
Walter P. Story Building (1909), SE corner of 6th, once home to Mullen & Bluett

In 1910 the company rented the ground floor and basement of the Walter P. Story Building at Sixth and Broadway, at a time when all the major Los Angeles department stores (May Company California, The Broadway, Fifth Street Store/Walker's, Bullock's, J. W. Robinson's, Desmond's, etc.) had been establishing themselves on or adjacent to Broadway.

== Ambassador Hotel ==
On November 16, 1921, the company opened a shop in the Ambassador Hotel, at 3400 Wilshire Boulevard in what is now called Wilshire Center/Koreatown area of Los Angeles, joining I. Magnin who had already established a store there upon the hotel's opening in January of that year.

== Hollywood Boulevard ==
On May 19, 1922, Mullen & Bluett opened on Hollywood Boulevard in Hollywood, at the now-famous intersection of Hollywood and Vine, in the style of a two-story Tudor Gothic redience, in brick with stone trimming. It was the first of many large upscale clothing and department stores that would open in the early 1920s, making the boulevard an important upscale shopping destination in Los Angeles second only to Downtown Los Angeles (Broadway, Seventh Street).

== Miracle Mile branch ==
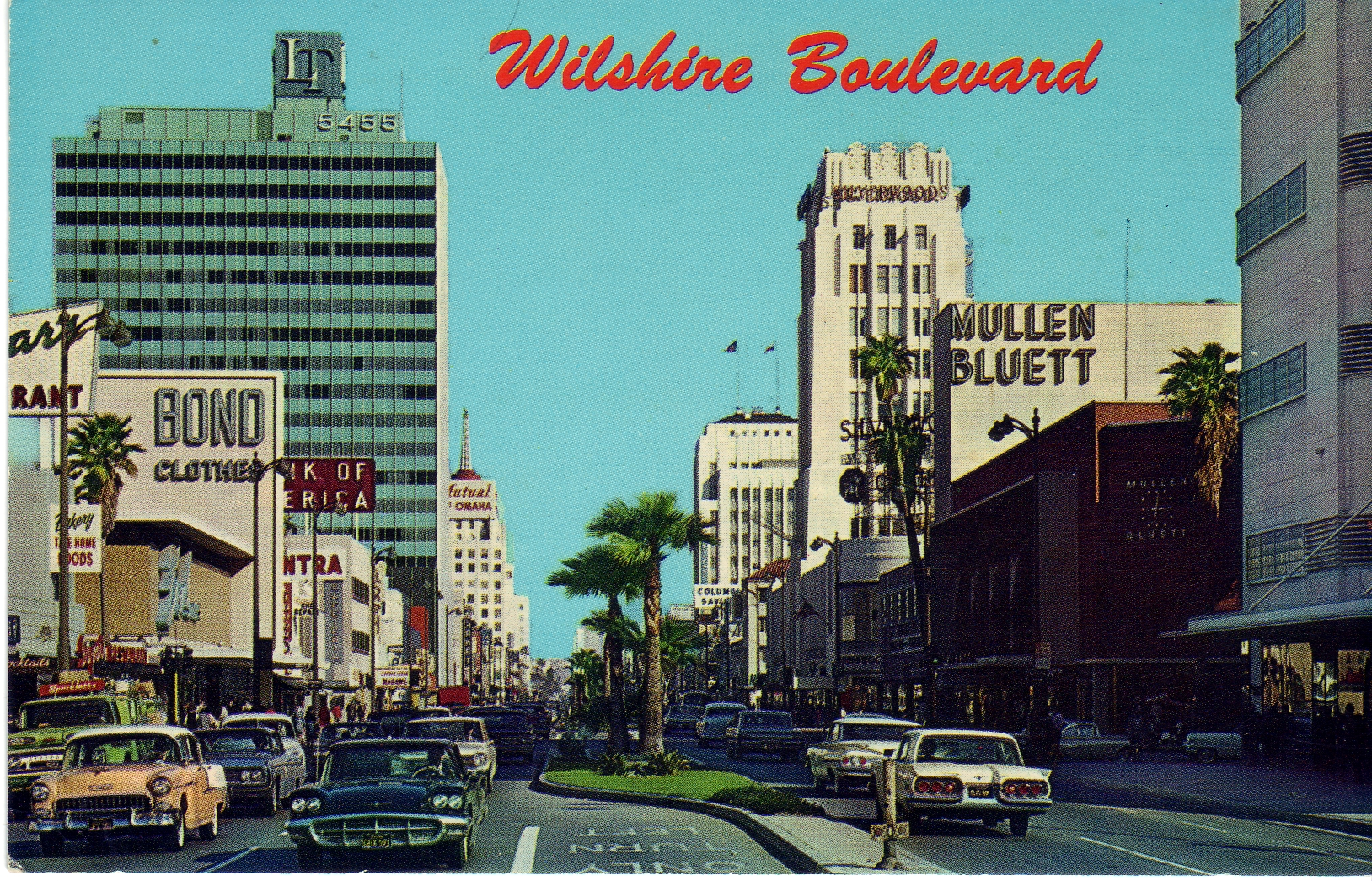
Mullen & Bluett Miracle Mile store is visible on right side of this 1960s postcard.

Architect Stiles O. Clements designed several Greater Los Angeles stores, and the one at 5570 Wilshire Boulevard on the Miracle Mile, Los Angeles as well as his adjacent Phelps-Terkel building at 5550 Wilshire, were considered landmarks by the Los Angeles Conservancy's Modern Committee. Nonetheless it was torn down in 2006, replaced with a large apartment complex in faux Art Deco design.

== Expansion and Demise ==
In 1968, Mullen & Bluett had expanded to eleven stores including Hollywood, the Miracle Mile of Wilshire Boulevard, the Beverly Wilshire Hotel in Beverly Hills, Pasadena, South Coast Plaza in Orange County and Montclair Plaza in the Inland Empire.

In that same year, the chain was purchased by Grodins, a Northern California men's clothing retailer.

In 1972, Grodins exited the Southern California market, blaming the recession in 1970-71 and stock market weakness for the resulting inability to finance by IPO both its acquisition of Mullen & Bluett and its November 1969, $1 million new flagship store in San Francisco.
