= Stiles Clements =

American architect

Stiles Oliver Clements
- Born: March 2, 1883; Centerville, Maryland, U.S.
- Died: January 15, 1966 (aged 82); Los Angeles, California, U.S.
- Education: Massachusetts Institute of Technology, École des Beaux-Arts
- Occupation: Architect
- Practice: Morgan, Walls & Clements; Stiles Clements & Associates

Stiles Oliver Clements (March 2, 1883 – January 15, 1966) was an American architect practicing in Los Angeles and Southern California.

== History ==
Clements trained at the École des Beaux-Arts, Paris. He was a key figure in the 1920s Art Deco and 1930s Streamline Moderne architectural movements in Los Angeles. He also designed in historicist motifs and revivalism styles, such as the Adamson House in the Spanish Colonial Revival and Moorish Revival styles. He obtained his Master's Degree in Architecture from MIT.

Clements was a partner with Octavius Morgan and John Walls at Morgan, Walls & Clements, known for his exuberant themed designs that included the Mayan and Wiltern theaters, the Richfield Tower, and many others. In 1937, he formed the firm Stiles Clements & Associates.

== Notable buildings ==
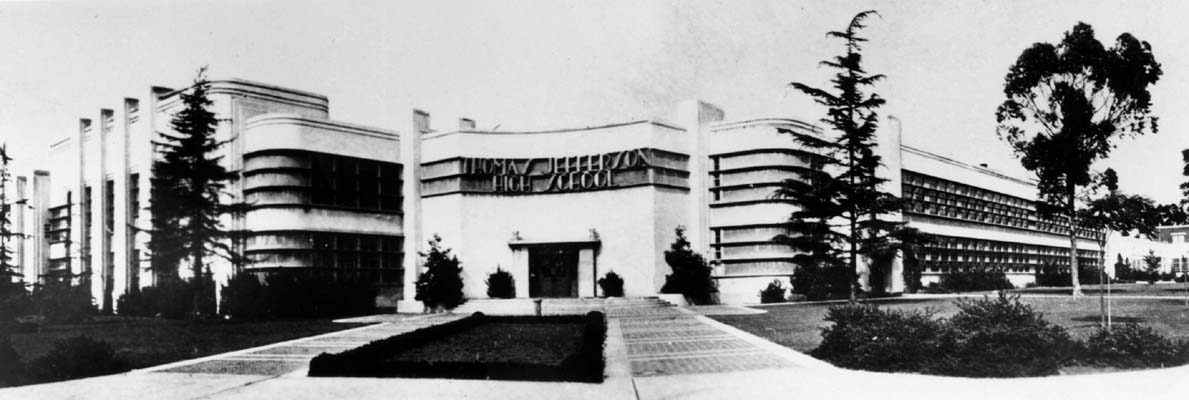
Jefferson High School (1935).

- 1927: Mayan Theater
- 1929: Geffen Playhouse
- 1929: Adamson House
- 1930: Citadel Outlets
- 1934: Walter P. Story Building garage entrance — Downtown Los Angeles, Moderne
- 1935: Jefferson High School — South Los Angeles; Streamline Moderne style.
- 1936: KEHE/KFI/KECA Radio Building — Los Angeles (demolished 2003)

=== Stiles O. Clements & Associates ===
- 1938: Coulter's Department Store, Wilshire Branch — Miracle Mile, Wilshire Boulevard, Los Angeles; moderne style (demolished 1980)
- 1938: Philharmonic Auditorium remodel of Clune's Auditorium for the Los Angeles Philharmonic Orchestra — downtown Los Angeles (demolished 1980s)
- 1939: "Swim Gym", Beverly Hills High School — Beverly Hills, California
- 1939: Facade of the refurbished Blackstone Building — downtown Los Angeles
- 1949: Mullen & Bluett Building — Miracle Mile, Wilshire Boulevard, Los Angeles; moderne style (demolished 2006); (disputed, may have been designed by son Robert Clements, Sr.)
- 1954: Occidental Savings Bank, Valley Plaza — 12140 Victory Boulevard, North Hollywood, Los Angeles
