= Richfield Tower =

Los Angeles headquarters of Richfield Oil (1929–1969)

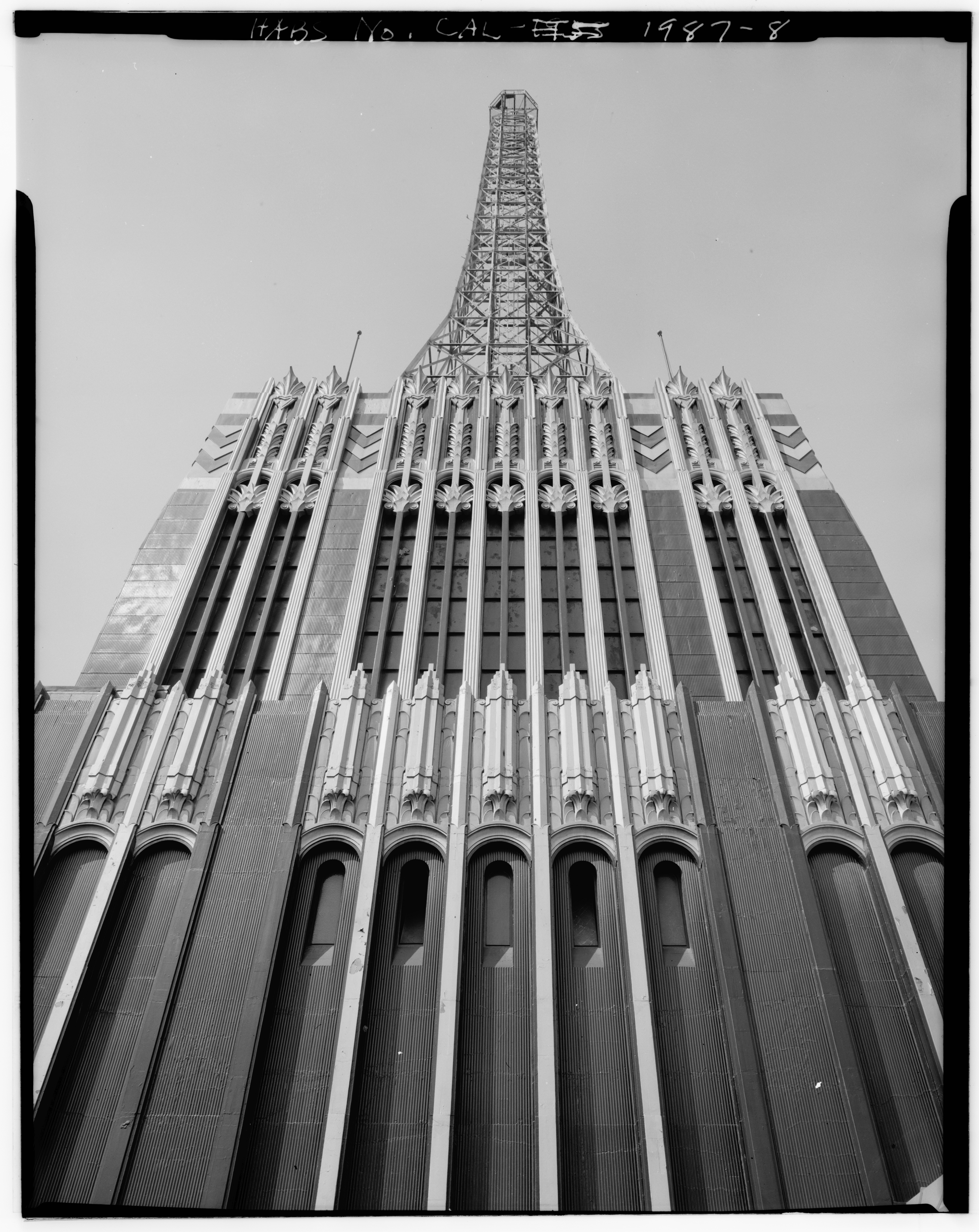
- The top of the building

General information
- Status: Demolished
- Architectural style: Art Deco
- Location: 555 South Flower Street, Los Angeles, California, United States of America
- Coordinates: 34.050799°N 118.256966°W
- Construction started: 1928
- Completed: 1929
- Demolished: November 12, 1968 – spring 1969
- Cost: $1,750,000
- Client: Richfield Oil Co.

Height
- Height: 372 feet (113 m)

Technical details
- Structural system: Steel skeleton
- Floor count: 12

Design and construction
- Architect: Stiles O. Clements

Richfield Tower, also known as the Richfield Oil Company Building, was an office tower that served as the headquarters of the Richfield Oil Corporation in Los Angeles, California. It was constructed between 1928 and 1929 and demolished in 1969, replaced by City National Plaza.

== History ==
It was designed by Stiles O. Clements and featured a black and gold Art Deco façade. The unusual color scheme was meant to symbolize the "black gold" that was Richfield's business. Haig Patigian did the exterior sculptures.

The 12-floor building was 372 feet (113 m) tall, including a 130-foot (40 m) tower atop the building, emblazoned vertically with the name "Richfield". Lighting on the tower was made to simulate an oilwell gusher and the motif was reused at some Richfield service stations.

The company outgrew the building, and it was demolished in 1969, much to the dismay of Los Angeles residents and those interested in architectural preservation, to make way for the ARCO Plaza skyscraper complex. The elaborate black-and-gold elevator doors were salvaged from the building and installed as public art in the lobby of the new ARCO building.

== Gallery ==
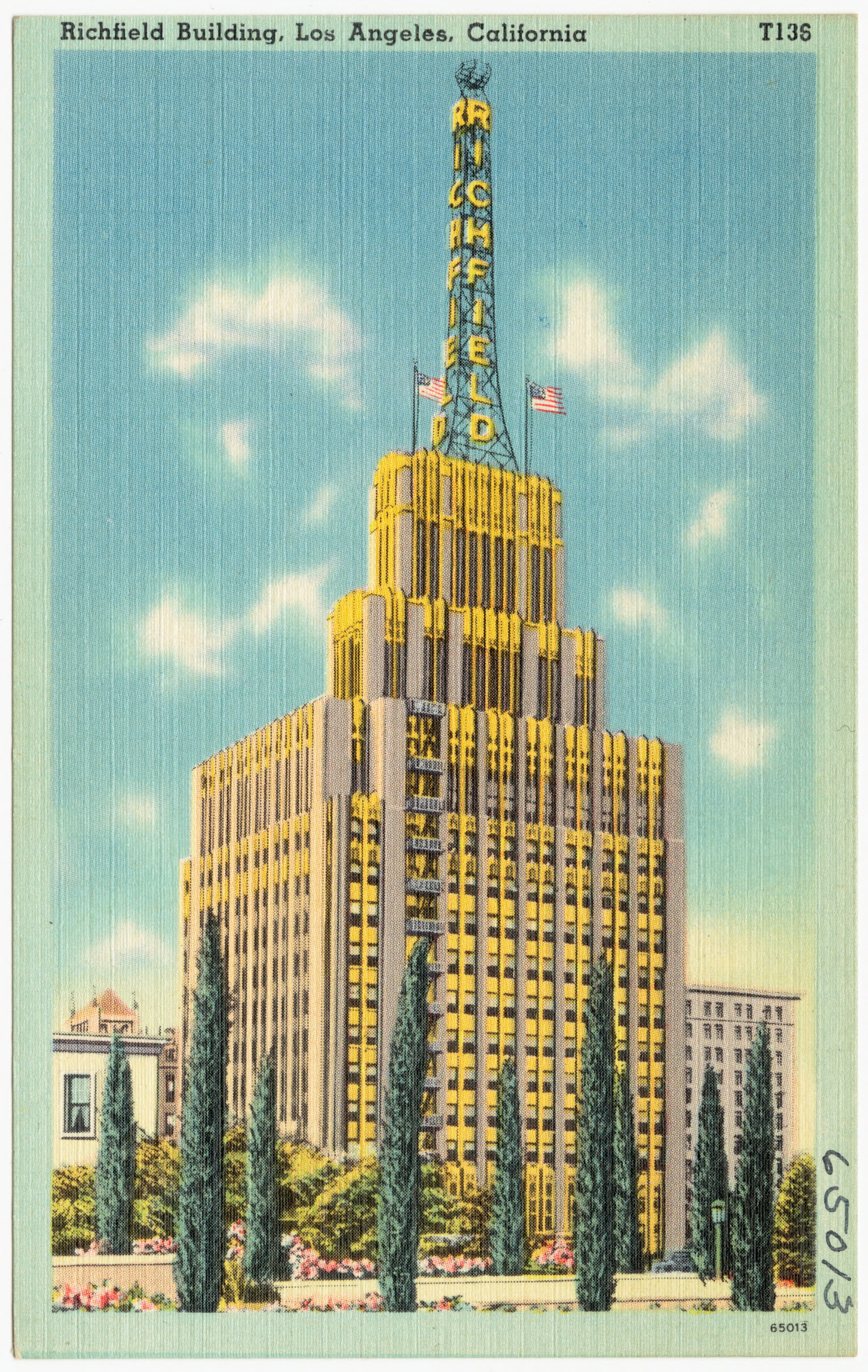
Colorized postcard from c. 1930–c. 1945

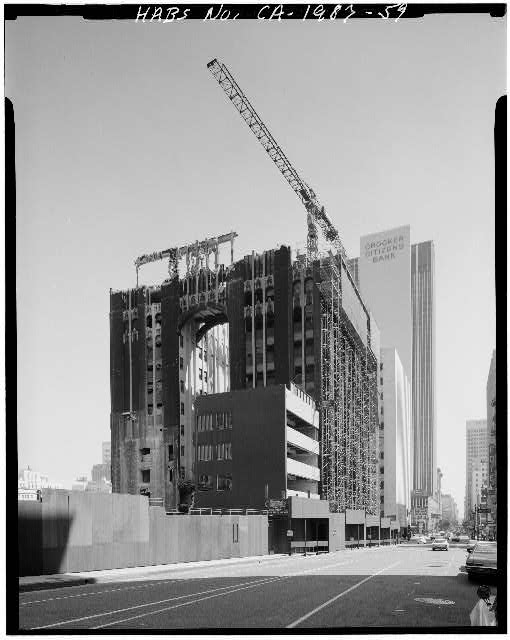
West side during demolition, April 1969

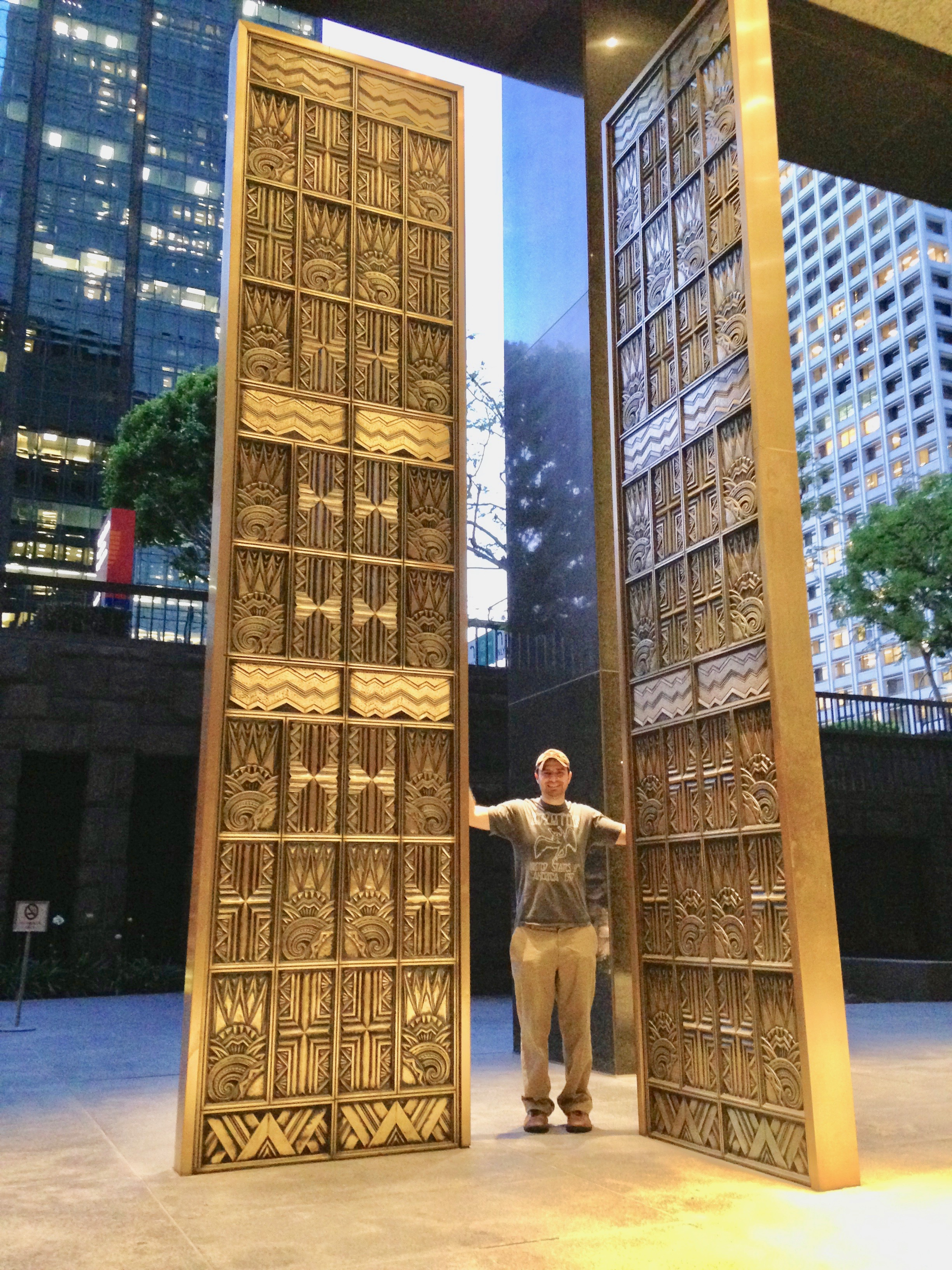
Elevator doors in 2025
