= Zigzag Moderne =

1920s architectural style

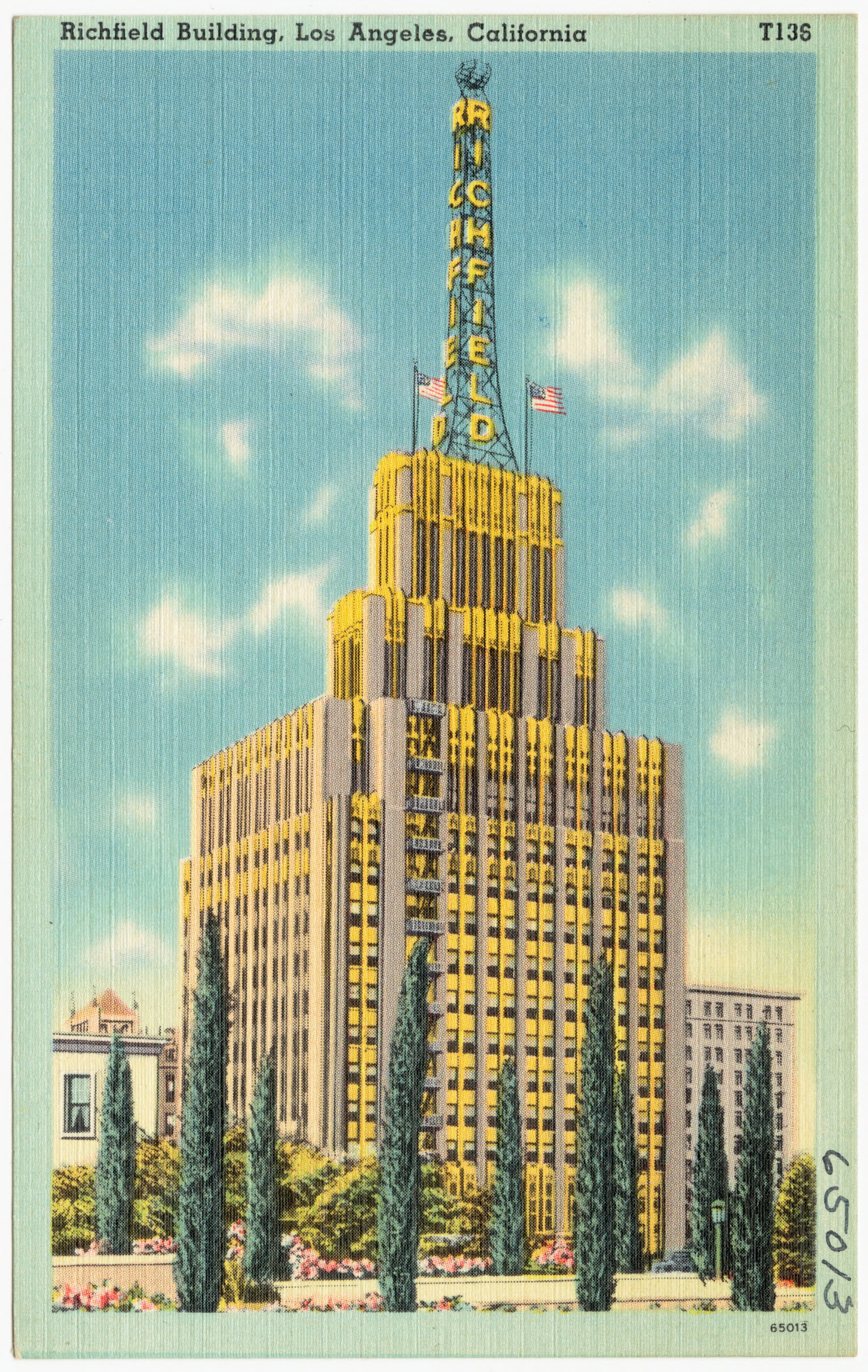
Richfield Tower (1929)

Zigzag Moderne is a substyle of the architectural Art Deco if the classification established by David Gebhard is used (Robert M. Craig would define the style simply as "Art Deco"). The Zigzag style was popular in the 1920s and was replaced by the Streamline Moderne in the 1930s.

== History ==
Gebhard traces the roots of the Zigzag Moderne to the works of Bertram G. Goodhue and Eliel Saarinen, as well as influence of the emerging International Style and the 1925 International Exhibition of Modern Decorative and Industrial Arts in Paris with its Frank Lloyd Wright's designs. He also notes the diversity of sources between the Zigzag and the succeeding Streamline style, with the latter inspired by the "machine aesthetic" of aerodynamic shapes.

== Characteristics ==
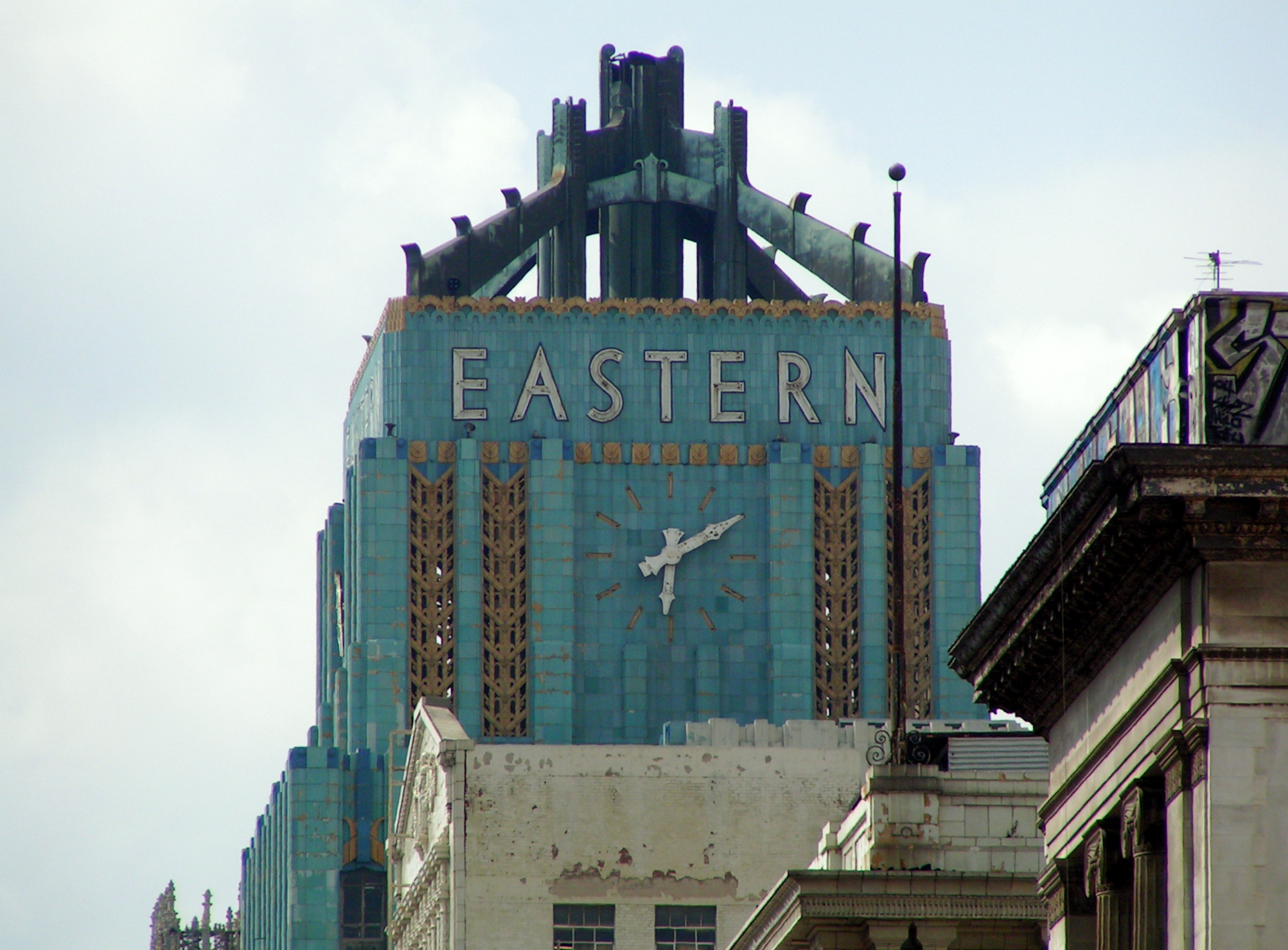
Golden chevron decorations on the Eastern Columbia Building (1929)

Gebhard lists the following traits of the Zigzaq Moderne:

- heavy and monumental exterior forms built of smooth surfaces with window openings arranged within inset panels;
- flat roof, no Classical or Gothic termination at the top;
- central tower that lowers in steps to the periphery;
- decorations consist of zigzags, chevrons, sunbursts, spirals, stylized flora and fauna.

== Examples ==
Bleksmith lists the following examples:

- Bullock's Wilshire Department Store (Los Angeles, 1929) by John and Donald Parkinson;
- Eastern Columbia Building (Los Angeles, 1929) by Claude Beelman;
- Pellissier Building and Wiltern Theatre (Los Angeles, 1930) by Morgan, Walls & Clements;
- Richfield Tower (Los Angeles, 1929) by Stiles O. Clements.

The skyscraper buildings in New York (for example, the Chrysler Building by William Van Allen) are usually classified as Zigzag, although sometimes separated into the "skyscraper style" (for example, by Rosemarie Haag Bletter). Bleksmith lists, in addition to the Chrysler Building:

- Barclay–Vesey Building (1923–1926) by Ralph Thomas Walker;
- Empire State Building (1931) by Shreve, Lamb & Harmon Associates;
- RCA Victor Building (1931) by Cross & Cross.

== Gallery ==
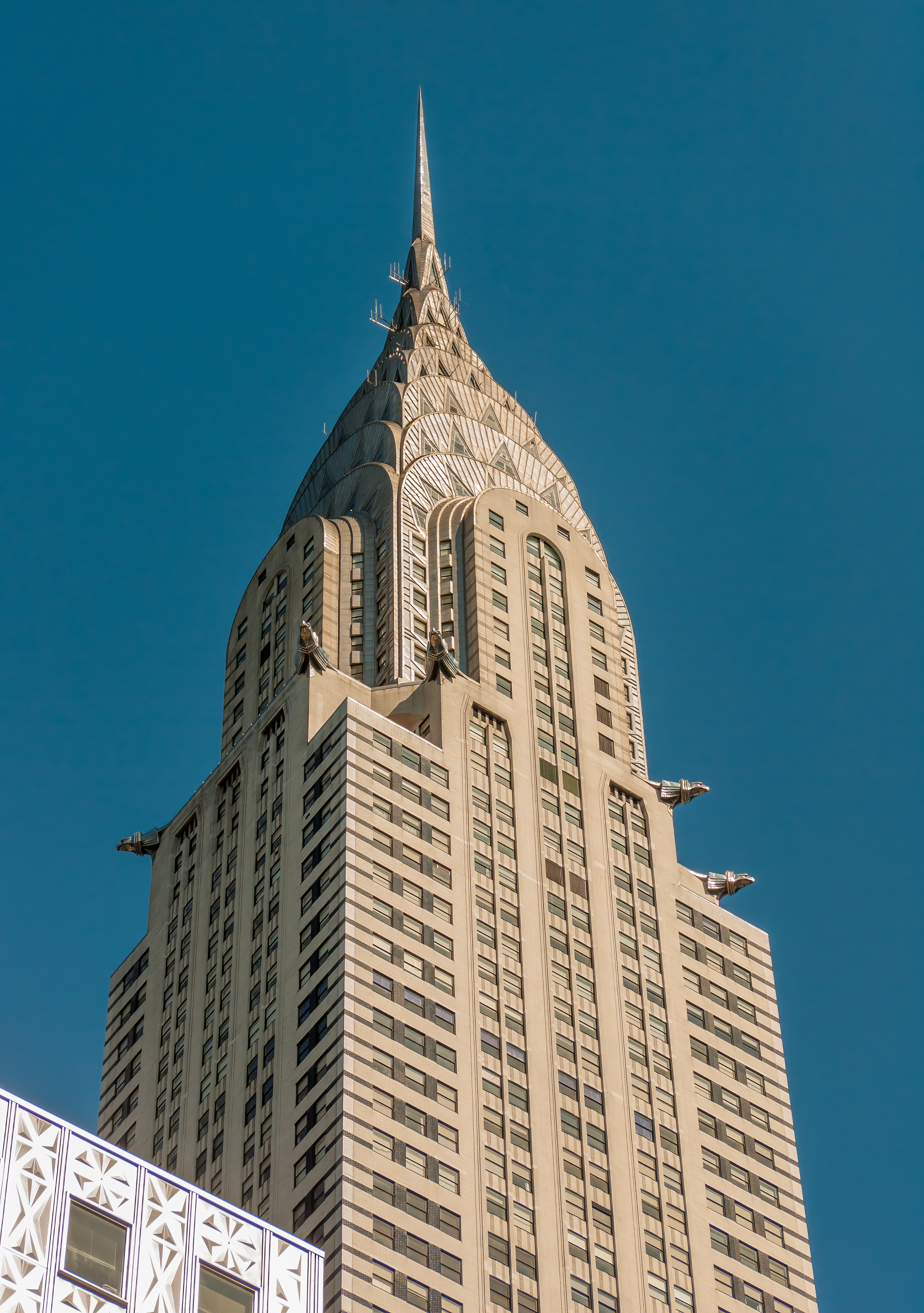
Chrysler Building (1930)

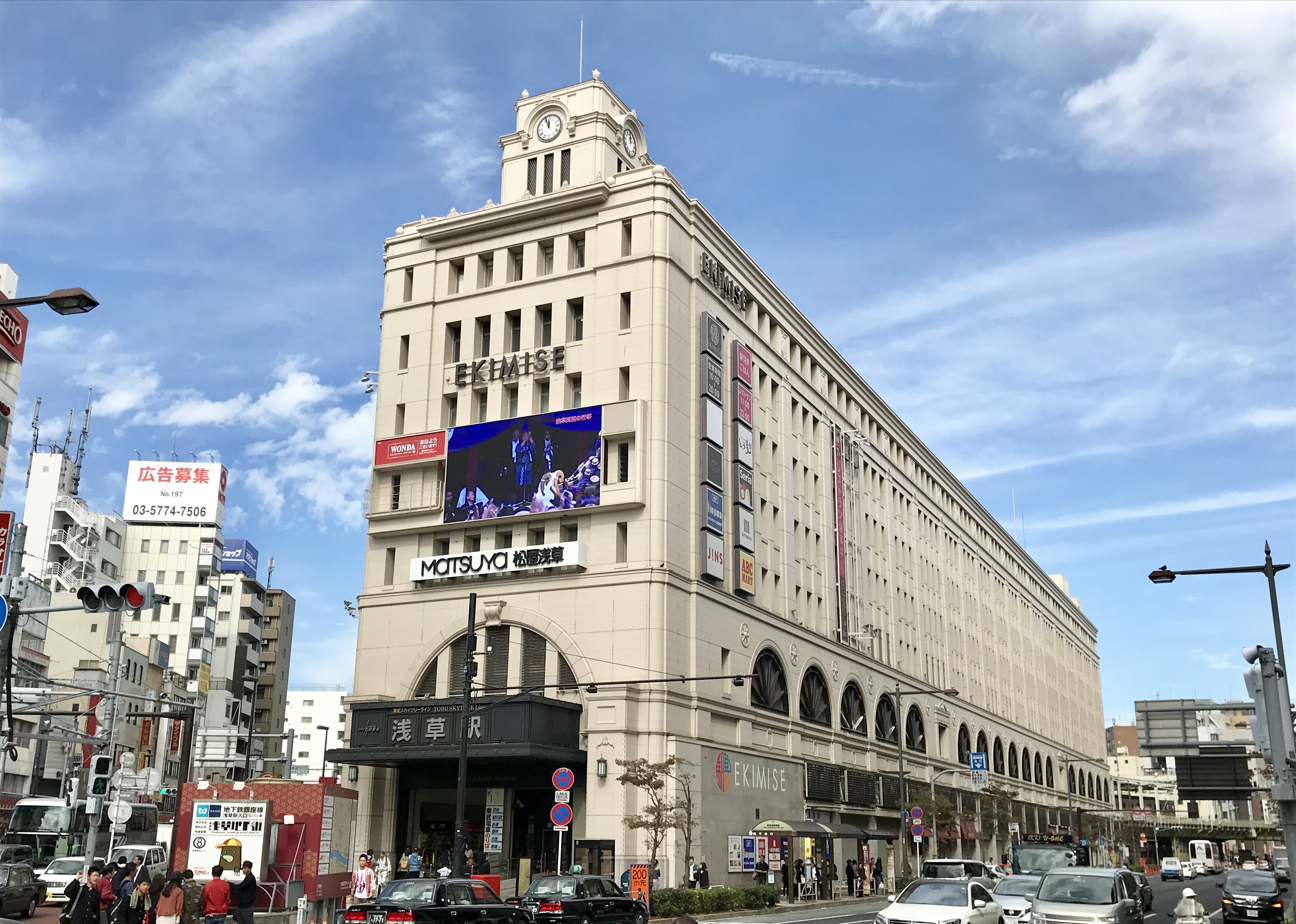
Tobu-Asakusa Station (1927)

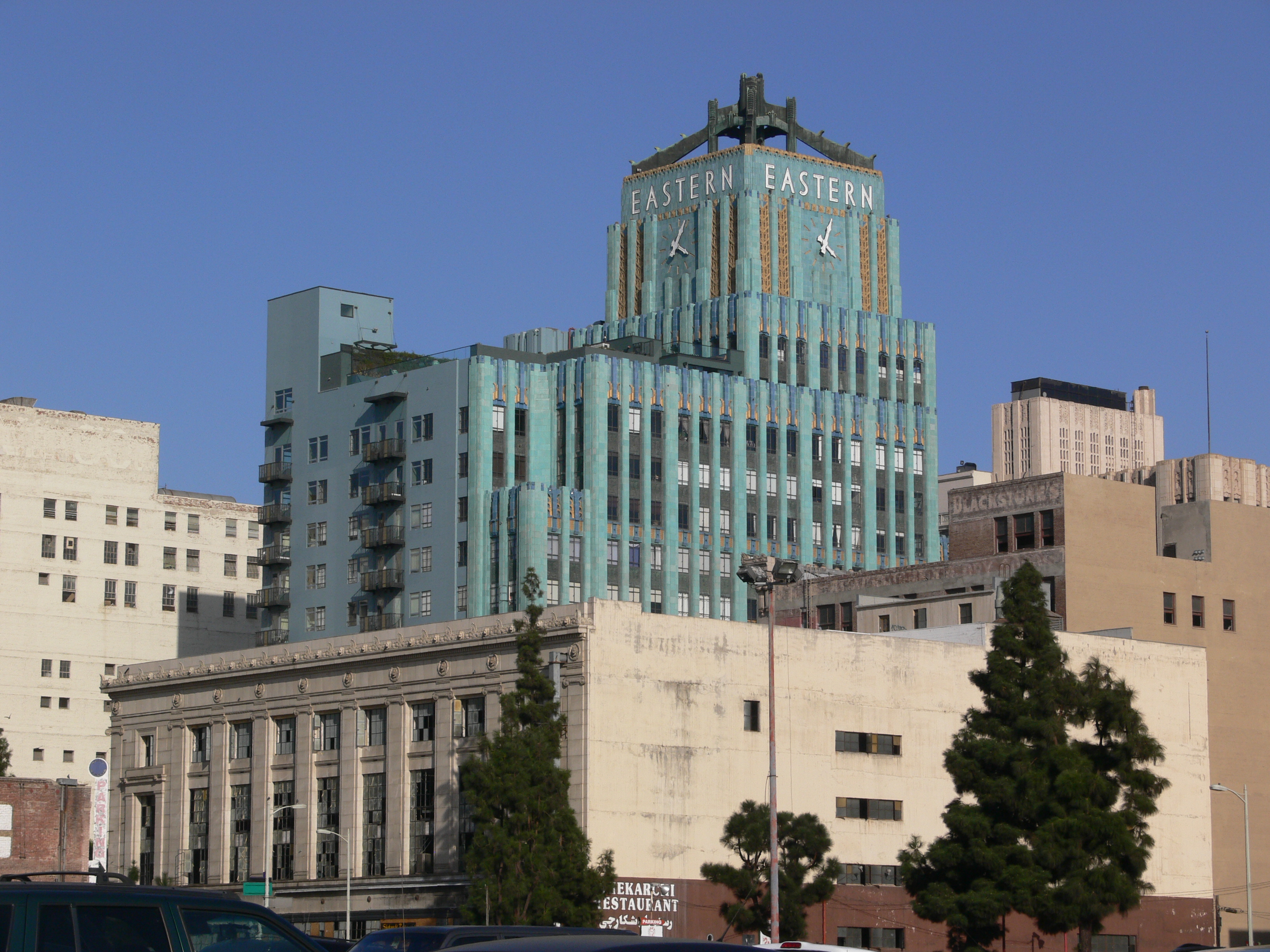
Eastern Columbia Building (1929)

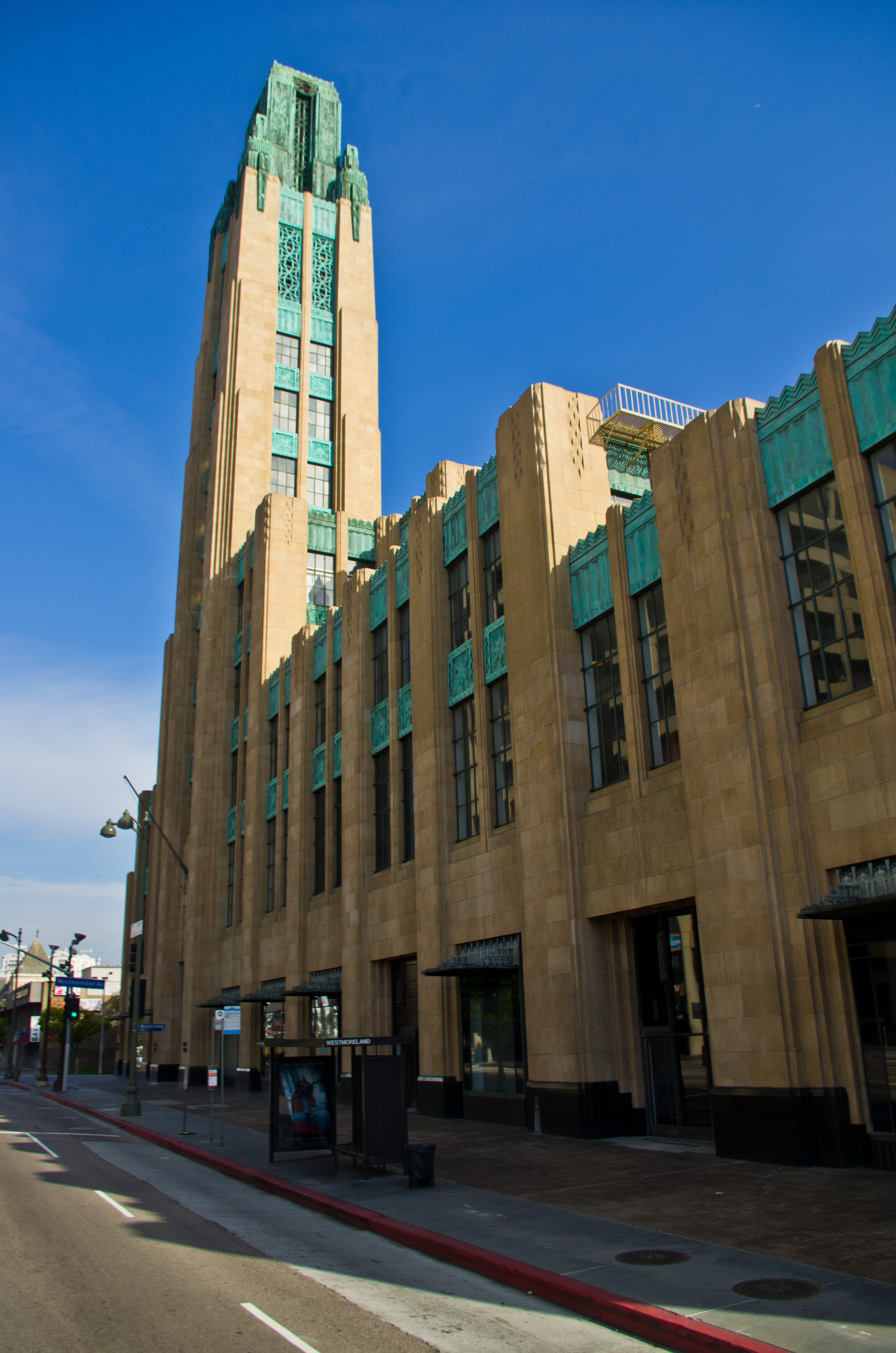
Bullock's Wilshire Department Store (1929)

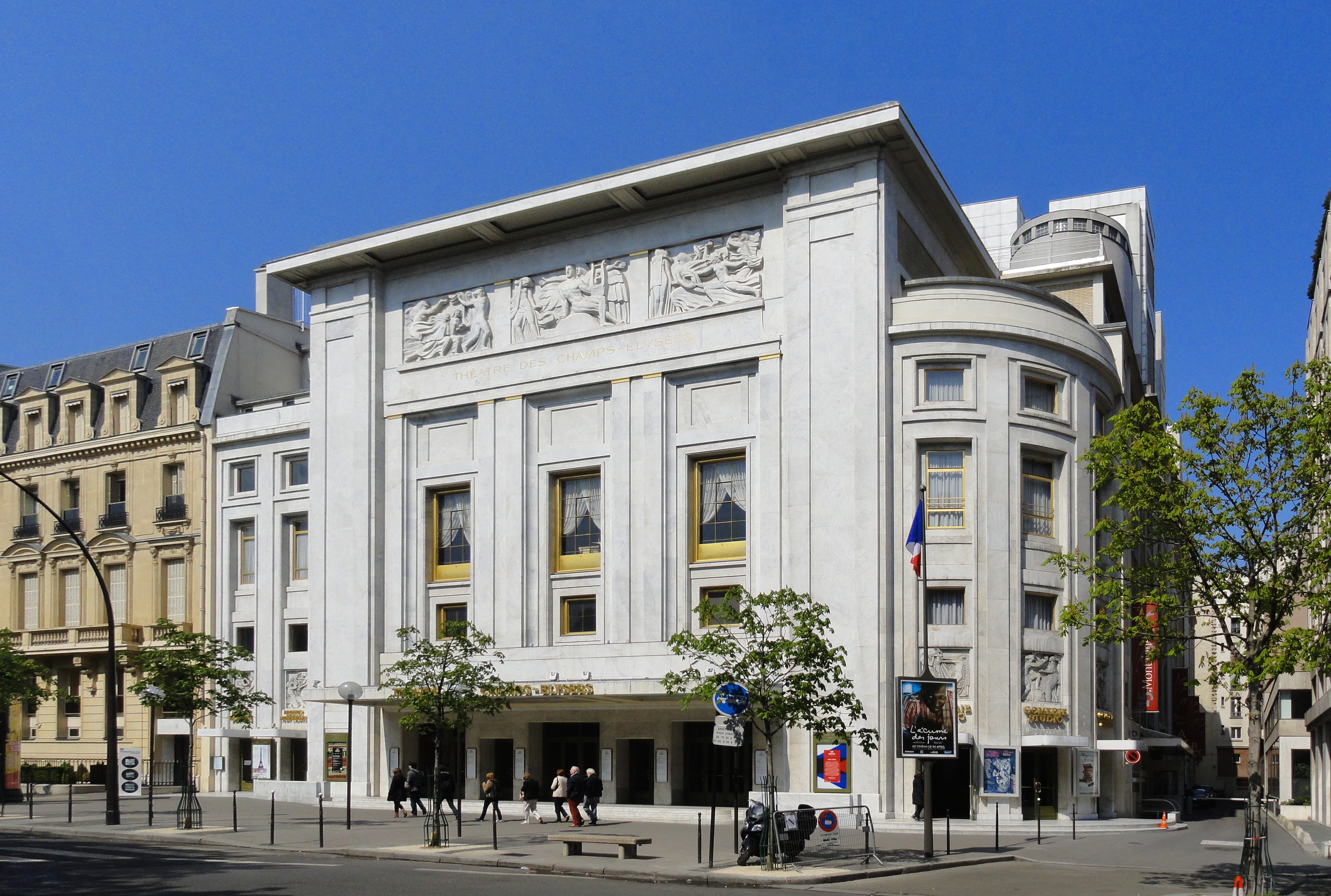
Theatre des Champs-Elysées (1913)

== Sources ==
- Bleksmith, Anne (2011). "Art Deco architecture". The Grove Encyclopedia of American Art. Vol. 1. Oxford University Press. pp. 144–148. ISBN 978-0-19-533579-8.
- Gebhard, D. (1978). "Moderne (Art Deco) Style (1920 to 1941)". A Guide to the Architecture of Minnesota. University of Minnesota Press. ISBN 978-1-4529-0101-5.
- Padwa, L. (1996). Everything You Pretend to Know And Are Afraid Someone Will Ask. Penguin Publishing Group. ISBN 978-1-101-65723-2.
