= Silverwoods =

Clothing store chain

- Formerly: F. B. Silverwood
- Industry: Clothing
- Founded: May 8, 1894 in Los Angeles, USA
- Founder: Francis Bernard Silverwood
- Defunct: 1992
- Fate: Closed
- Parent: Hartmarx Corporation

Silverwoods, originally promoted as F. B. Silverwood, after its founder, was a men's clothing store chain founded in Los Angeles in 1894 by Francis Bernard (F.B. "Daddy") Silverwood, a Canadian-American originally from near Lindsay, Ontario. He was a colorful character covered in the newspapers, a "songster" composer of popular songs, Shriner, and who famously married in 1920.

The first F. B. Silverwood store opened on May 8, 1894 at 124 S. Spring St., carried only men's furnishings, had four employees and had sales of $38,000 (~$1.41 million in 2025) that year. Silverwood then moved to a larger location at 221 S. Spring St. The flagship store was established in 1904 at Sixth & Broadway. In 1920 the store removed to temporary quarters at 320 S. Broadway while the old store was demolished starting January 26, 1920. A new 115,420 sq ft (10,723 m^{2}) six-floor store was built on the site of the old one at 6th and Broadway. The new store opened September 1, 1920. It closed in 1974 shortly after Silverwoods opened a new downtown store in Broadway Plaza (now The Bloc Los Angeles) on Seventh Street.

Upon opening in 1920 the flagship had the following departments:

- 1st floor, hats and furnishings
- 2nd floor, suits and overcoats
- 3rd floor, boys' clothing
- 4th floor, storeroom
- 5th floor, general offices and alterations
- Basement, outing and work clothes; gloves

The company incorporated in November 1920. At that time there were four branches (Long Beach, Bakersfield, Maricopa and San Bernardino) plus the flagship. F. B. Silverwood died in March 1924. In later decades the store was purchased by Hartmarx and focused on business suits until the end, later becoming out of sync with clothing preferences of Southern California men.

By 1992 when the chain closed, Silverwoods had grown to an eighteen store chain with branches across Greater Los Angeles.

== Stores ==
In 1973, Silverwoods branches were located at:

Community	Location	Notes
Downtown Los Angeles Broadway shopping district	6th & Broadway	Final flagship store. Opened September 1, 1920. Closed 1974.
Downtown Los Angeles 7th Street shopping district	Broadway Plaza, 7th & Hope	
University Park, Los Angeles	University of Southern California	
Miracle Mile, Los Angeles	5522 Wilshire Boulevard	opened 1929, in the "Wilshire Tower" complex by architect Gilbert Stanley Underwood together with Desmond's
Crenshaw District	4129 Crenshaw Boulevard, Crenshaw Center (now Baldwin Hills Crenshaw Plaza)	opened April 8, 1949, 22,500 square feet (2,090 m^{2}), Albert B. Gardener, architect
Anaheim	Anaheim Center	
Panorama City, Los Angeles (San Fernando Valley)	Panorama City Shopping Center	opened 10/10/1955 in a complex with The Broadway Valley branch
Torrance	Del Amo Fashion Square	
Pasadena, California	Lake Avenue	
Century City, Los Angeles	Century City Shopping Center	
Canoga Park	Topanga Plaza	
Oxnard, California		
San Bernardino		
Santa Barbara	833 State St.	
Las Vegas		
Newport Beach	Fashion Island	
Montclair	Montclair Plaza	
La Habra	La Habra Fashion Square	
Palm Springs, California	Desert Fashion Plaza 155 North Palm Canyon Drive	
Riverside		
Downey	Stonewood Center	
Cerritos	Los Cerritos Center	
