= Boston Stores (California-based department store) =

American department store chain

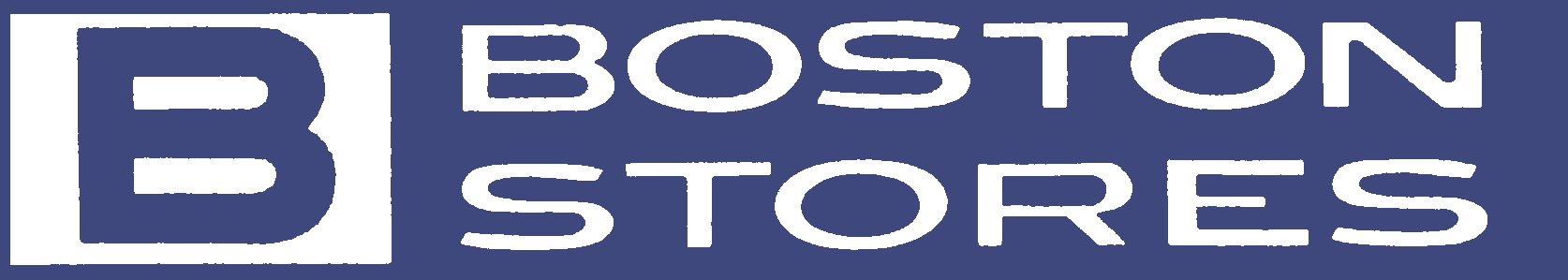
Boston Stores final logo

Boston Stores, originally and later still often called The Boston Store, was a chain of department stores based in Inglewood, California, just southwest of Central Los Angeles, that operated from 1934 through 1996.

Ira Kaufman started the chain with a single store in downtown Inglewood in 1934. It grew to 20 stores by 1990, 14 in California and 6 in Arizona, with around 1,000 employees. In 1990 its headquarters was moved to Carson, about 13 miles south of Inglewood.

There have been dozens of stores called "Boston Store" in the U.S., including J. W. Robinson's which went by that name in the late 19th and early 20th century in its downtown Los Angeles locations; and two unrelated "Boston Stores"—one operating in 1925 at 320 S. Broadway in Downtown Los Angeles in the old Blackstone's Department Store building; and another in 1939, with branches at 331 S. Broadway in the old Jacoby Bros. store and at 4755 Whittier Blvd. in East Los Angeles. Neither were related to the Inglewood-based Boston Stores.

== Other department stores acquired ==
=== Myers Whittier ===
Boston Stores acquired the Myers Whittier department store in Whittier in 1972. Myers dated back to about 1905 when brothers Lemuel A. and Wilbert S. Myers founded the Myers Dry Goods Company in a 25-foot-wide (8-meter) storefront at 109 S. Greenleaf Ave., with a staff of five.

Four years later around 1911, Myers expanded its space to a 50-foot-wide (15-meter) space at 110-2 S. Greenleaf. In 1920, they moved again to new 10,000 sq ft (930 m^{2}) space at 141 N. Greenleaf, and in 1922 expanded there, doubling in size to 20,000 sq ft (1,900 m^{2}).

Myers moved to its fourth, final and largest-ever location in Uptown Whittier in 1955, spanning 42,000 sq ft (3,900 m^{2}) with parking for 90 cars. Myers rebranded the store "Myers Whittier".

Initially, after it acquired Myers Whittier in 1972, Boston Stores kept the existing name and branding. It even opened a new store in the Whittwood Center mall on May 2, 1974, as "Myers Whittwood". However, it changed the names of the two Whittier stores to "Boston Stores" in 1976.

=== Wineman's ===
In 1984, Boston Stores acquired Wineman's department stores, with origins in Ventura and Oxnard but since 1924 a legendary anchor of the busy Pacific Boulevard shopping district in Huntington Park, the busiest in the southeastern Los Angeles suburbs from the 1930s through the 1950s. The company had had ambitious expansion plans in the early 1920s, but wound up retreating to a single location in Huntington Park by the late 1920s. In 1969, it embarked on expansion plans again, and in this era (1969–1983) expanded across Southern California. Boston Stores converted several Wineman's branches to Boston Stores:

- Huntington Park flagship, 6351 Pacific Bl., location opened in 1935 with 16,000 sq ft (1,500 m^{2}). Pacific Boulevard was the busiest shopping district in the southeastern Los Angeles suburbs from the 1930s through the 1950s. The store had expanded in 1940, 1957 and 1966 — from a 25-foot storefront in 1924 to one of 150 feet by 1966.
- Placentia, 110 E. Yorba Linda Bl., 26,400 square feet (2,450 m^{2}), opened October 19, 1973
- Mission Viejo, Mission Viejo Village Center, opened c. September 1975
- Corona

=== Moore's (Lompoc) ===
Boston Stores bought Moore's Department Store in Lompoc in 1990.

== Historic expansion ==
The Boston Stores underwent the following historic expansion across Southern California and Arizona:

California stores opened prior to 1986

| Opened | Closed | City | Location | Sq ft | Sq m | Notes | Sources |
|---|---|---|---|---|---|---|---|
| 1934 | Feb 1962 | Inglewood | Downtown: 100 S. Market St. | | | Chaix and Johnson were to design a new interior but the store closed c. February 1962 | |
| 1955 | | Hawthorne | 345 S. Hawthorne Bl. at 131st St. | | | Renovation led by architects Burke, Kober and Nicolais; reopened in March 1965 with new façade, air conditioning. | |
| Oct 20, 1961 | | Inglewood | Crenshaw-Imperial Plaza | 30,000 | 2,787 | Expanded November 1967. Chaix and Johnson, architects | |
| 1963 | | Seal Beach | Rossmoor Center | 45,000 | 4,181 | Largest store | |
| Oct 10, 1968 | | Fullerton | Orangefair Mall | 42,000 | 3,902 | 2 stories, 5th to open in chain | |
| Nov 14, 1968 | | Anaheim | East Anaheim Shopping Center | 40,000 | 3,716 | 6th in chain to open | |
| 1972 (acquired); 1955 as Myers | Dec 1980 | Whittier | Uptown: 6557 Greenleaf at Bailey | | | Building opened as the new single location of Myers Whittier department store on November 17, 1955. Acquired by Boston Stores 1972. Rebranded as Boston Stores 1976. Building houses medical offices as of 2024. 33.9811355°N 118.0377288°W | |
| May 2, 1974 | | Whittier | Whittwood Center | | | Opened as a Boston Stores branch but branded Myers Whittwood. Branding changed to Boston Stores in 1976. | |
| Dec 1976 | | Inglewood | Downtown: 315 S. Market St. | | | opened December 1976 after 15 year absence from Downtown Inglewood | |
| Sep 18, 1981 | | Diamond Bar | Diamond Bar Towne Center | | | | |
| | | Hemet | Diamond Valley Shopping Center | | | | |
| Mar 26, 1983 | | Victorville | Hi Desert Plaza (Bear Valley at Hesperia) | | | 15th store upon opening | |

Converted from Wineman's in 1984

- Huntington Park, location opened 1935, closed 1986
- Mission Viejo, Mission Viejo Village Center, opened c. September 1975
- Placentia, Placentia Town Center, opened 1973

California, opened 1986– As of December 1985, Boston Stores operated 13 locations in California and 6 in Arizona. Store openings thereafter were:

- Lancaster, opened c.1986
- Ridgecrest, opened c. 1987
- Pomona, opened c.1988, closed c.1990
- Poway, Poway Plaza, 17,800 sq ft (1,650 m^{2}), opened September 16, 1988, 17th store in chain at time
- Camarillo, Camarillo Village Square, opened November 25, 1988
- Lompoc, 118 W. Ocean, opened November 2, 1990, formerly Moore's Department Store
- Oceanside, Mission Marketplace, opened September 12, 1991

Arizona stores

- Flagstaff, Cedar Pines Shopping Center (open as of 1985)
- Glendale, open as of 1985
- Maryvale, open as of 1985
- Mesa, open as of 1995
- Prescott, open as of 1995
- Sun City, open as of 1986

The Corona, Garden Grove, Monrovia Wineman's stores were no longer listed in advertisements in 1986.

== Decline and liquidation ==
The chain had long promoted moderately-priced national brands such as Hart, Schaffner and Marx, as it promoted them: "quality leadership brands", with a philosophy of operating intimate, smaller stores of 10,000 to 20,000 square feet (though some were larger, like Rossmore), in neighborhood shopping centers and areas that were relatively far from, or otherwise underserved by malls and mainline department stores.

In 1984, Chairman Donald Kaufman led management in a leveraged buyout of his father, Ira. This, in addition to acquiring chains like Wineman's and Malcolms, and a new $1 million computerized inventory and cash register system, added greatly to the company's debt in the 1980s. In an interview with the Torrance Daily Breeze, Donald Kaufman admitted that the company lost a lot of money in 1985, though it was doing better in 1986. The chain closed some stores around this time, such as Orangefair in Fullerton and Crenshaw-Imperial Plaza in Inglewood.

In addition, by the mid-1980s, times were tough for the local junior department stores as larger malls had reached most areas of Greater Los Angeles. They had fewer nice markets, areas where they could do well.

In 1992, Boston Stores sought Chapter 11 bankruptcy protection. Some stores closed.

Remaining stores were liquidated in 1996.
