= Record Alley =

Coordinates: 33.7235°N 116.3934°W

- Founded: 1978
- Defunct: January 2021
- Headquarters: Westfield Palm Desert; Palm Desert, California
- Owner: Jim and Shelly Stephens
- Website: www.recordalley.com

Record Alley is a record shop at the Westfield Palm Desert in Palm Desert, California.

== History ==
The Record Alley originally opened in 1978 on North Palm Canyon Drive in Palm Springs, California and founded by Jim and Shelly Stephens. Missing Persons had an in-store signing there attended by hundreds of fans. Later in 1985, the store moved to the then Palm Desert Mall. Since then, it has been visited by such musical artists as Alice Cooper, Billy Gibbons, Barry Manilow, and New Boyz. New Boyz had an on-site dance contest that caused a riot and subsequently covered by KESQ-TV.

In April 2011, during the Big 4 concert featuring Anthrax, Megadeth, Metallica, and Slayer; at the Empire Polo Club in Indio, California, the Record Alley suffered a shortage of Anthrax shirts.

In November 2013, the store's Record Store Day featured special performances from local performers.

In April 2015, a few hundred people attended the store's Record Store Day.

In December 2016, the Record Alley received significant sales after Christmas.

In October 2017, the Hellions' first official release Hymns From the Other Side was made available for purchase at the Record Alley. The band, Reborn by the Sunshine, which includes hair and make-up artist Chelsea Dorris on banjo, played there as well.

In December 2020, the company announced that it would be going out of business, in part due to the coronavirus pandemic.

== Reception ==
Billboard's Ed Christman said the Record Alley was "unusual, if not unique, by two counts [...] one of the only independent stores still operating in an enclosed mall." Former Record Store Day ambassador and Queens of the Stone Age founder Josh Homme endorsed the Record Alley. The Record Alley also received Coachella Valley Independent's award "Best Retail Music/Video Store" for 2016.
