= Desmond's (department store) =

Los Angeles department store

Desmond's Department Store
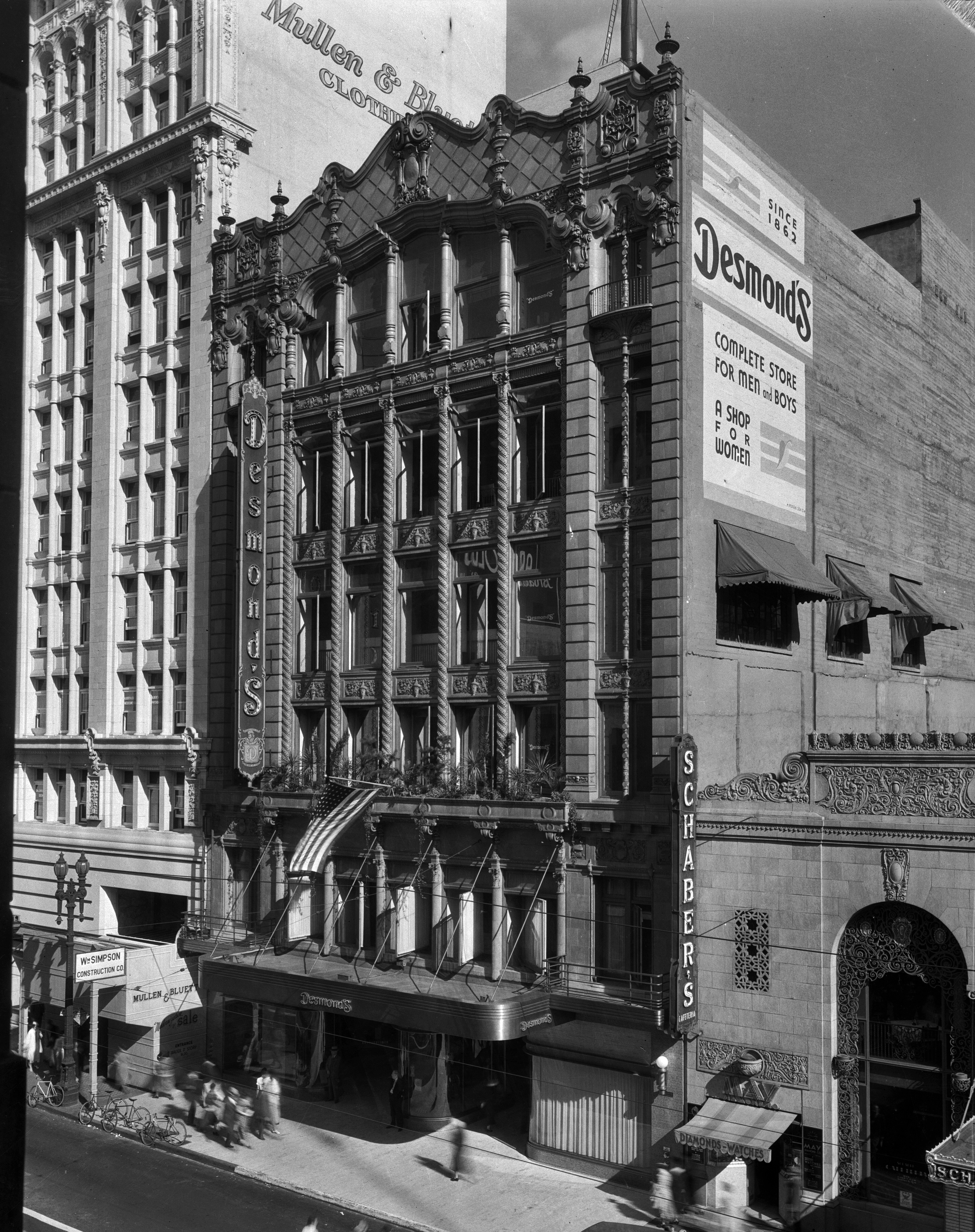
- Industry: Retail
- Founded: 1860s (exact year uncertain)
- Headquarters: California

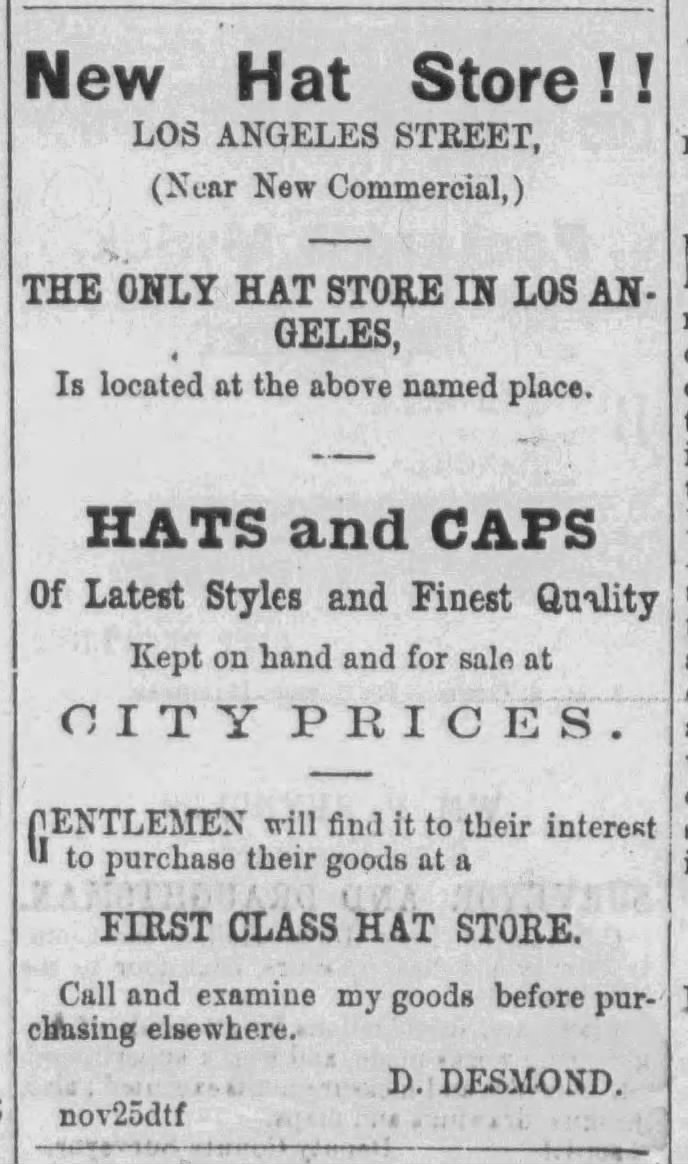
Advertisement for Desmond's new hat shop in the Los Angeles Daily News in November 1869

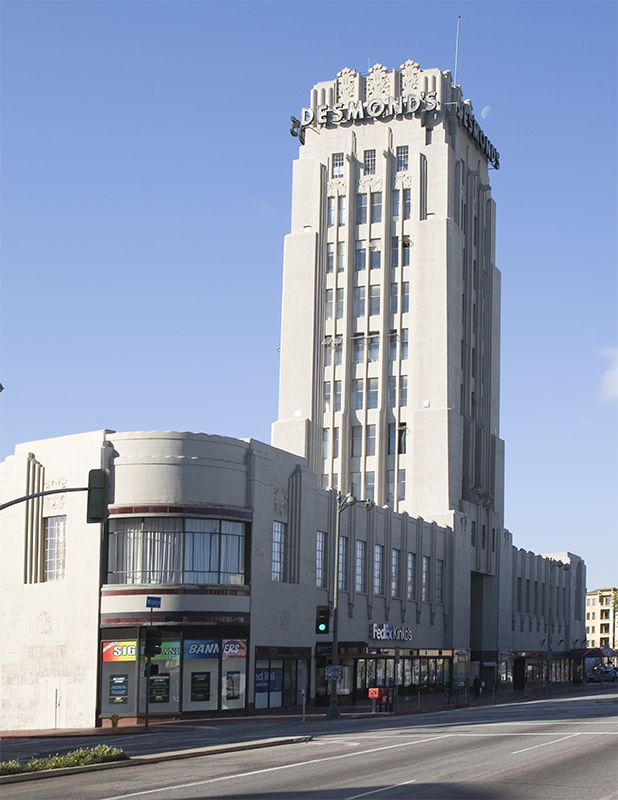
Former Desmond's Miracle Mile store on Wilshire Blvd.

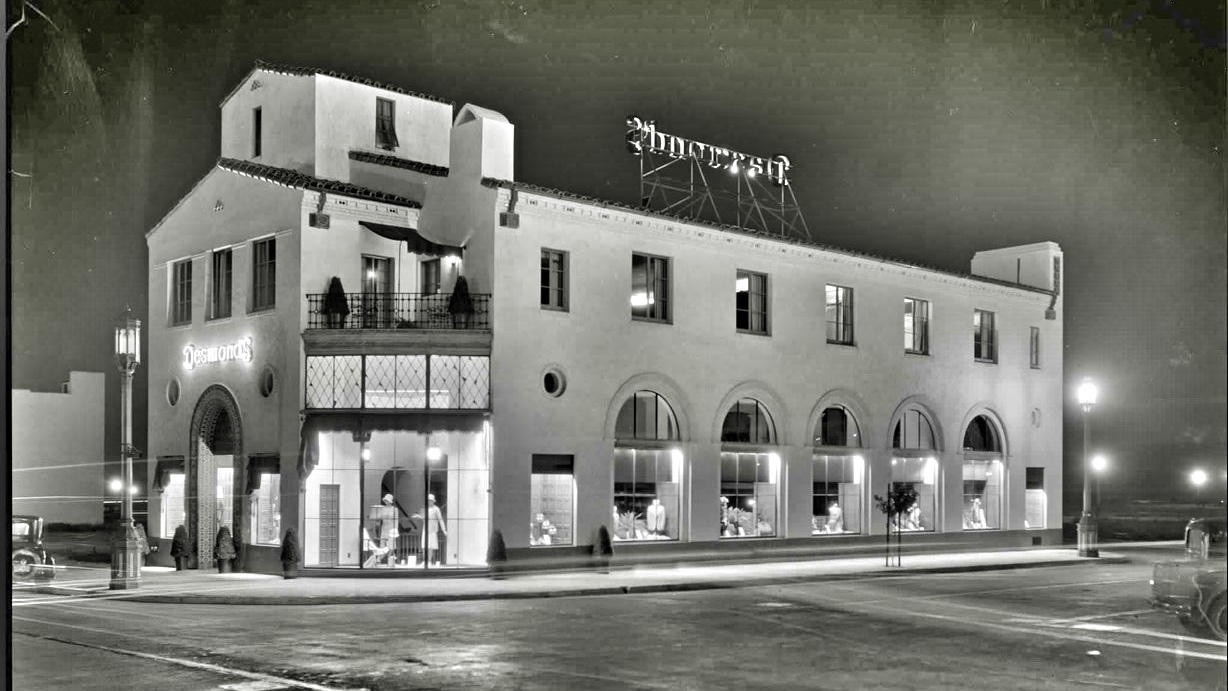
Desmond's Westwood store in 1925

Desmond's was a Los Angeles–based department store, during its existence second only to Harris & Frank as the oldest Los Angeles retail chain, founded in the 1860s as a hat shop by Daniel Desmond at Los Angeles and Commercial streets. The chain as a whole went out of business in 1981 but Desmond's, Inc. continued as a company that went in to other chains to liquidate them. Desmond's stores in Northridge and West Covina were liquidated only in 1986 and survived in Palm Springs into the first years of the 21st century.

== Locations as a single store ==
Desmond's brother Cornelius was a hatter in San Francisco from at least c.1864 through 1879, for a time working with their other brother Jeremiah. The shop was variously located at Bush and Sansome (1860s), under the Cosmopolitan Hotel (1869) and under the Grand Hotel (1870s) and/or at new Montgomery at Market streets.

The exact year that Desmond arrived in Los Angeles, and the location of his first store, varies according to the source:

- Desmond's department store, in celebrating its anniversaries, consistently referred to Desmond's first store as being established "near the Los Angeles Plaza" in the year 1882 as did the Los Angeles Times.
- The Historical Society of Southern California, however, gave the date of Desmond's arrival in Los Angeles as October 14, 1868
- The first mention of Mr. Desmond in Los Angeles newspapers was in November 1869, when the Los Angeles Star and Daily News both reported the opening of, and when Desmond first advertised, his "new hat shop", at the corner of Los Angeles and Commercial streets. It thus remains unclear if this was indeed the date of Desmond establishing his first shop, or his second.

1862 was the second year of the American Civil War and the 16th year that the US ruled California, Daniel Desmond arrived in the state via clipper ship via Cape Horn, Chile, as there was no transcontinental railroad. Los Angeles had a population of less than 4,500.

In any case, the first store reportedly measured only a few square feet and Desmond was the only employee. Popular styles included tall, plush "toppers" that dandies wore, and wide-brimmed, flat-crowned "fiesta" hats popular with the Californio dones (gentlemen). Desmond was a member of the volunteer fire department.

In Desmond's 1869 advertisements, Desmond claimed to be the only hat store in Los Angeles, filling "a want that has long been felt".

In 1870 Desmond and other leading retailers moved to the Temple Block (Los Angeles) on Main Street.

In 1882, Desmond moved to no. 4 North Spring St., leading other retailers in moving to a new central business district around First and Spring streets, which was, according to the Los Angeles Times in 1937, "the rendezvous for socialites from San Francisco to Baja California". Desmond's opened in the Nadeau Block there.

In 1890, around the time that Los Angeles started horse-drawn streetcar service. Desmond moved his store to its fourth location, in the Bryson Block, 141 S. Spring St. at the northwest corner of 2nd St., which only ten years earlier had been considered "the country".

In 1900, Desmond's moved to its fifth location at Third and Spring in the Ramona Block, home to the Hotel Ramona.

In 1906, when it moved again across the street to the Douglas Building at 301 S. Spring St., its sixth home, as one of the largest retailers in Los Angeles at that time. Around this time Desmond's became a store of reference across Southern California, well known for a broad range of high quality men's attire.

In 1915, Desmond's moved to its seventh location, a new two-story building on 553 S. Spring St., and added women's and boys' shops. The building was demolished in 1924 to make way for the Pacific Southwest Trust and Savings Bank.

In 1924, Desmond's moved to its eighth and final location as a single store at 616 S. Broadway. Broadway was home to many other department stores at the time, including The Broadway, May Company, the Fifth Street Store, Silverwoods, Bullock's, N. B. Blackstone, and Eastern Columbia. Desmond's closed at this location in 1981.

Downtown Los Angeles flagship store
Address	Opening date	Closing date	Current building use
"Near Los Angeles Plaza"	1862?	1869?	
Brick bldg. on Los Angeles St. near Commercial St.	November 1869	1870	
Temple Block, corner of Spring, Main and Temple	1870	1882	demolished
4 N. Spring at 1st (now 104 N. Spring)	1882	1890	demolished
Bryson Block, 141 S. Spring at NW corner of 2nd	1890	1900	demolished
Ramona Block, 3rd/Spring	1900	1906	demolished
301 S. Spring st 3rd	1906	1915	
543 S. Spring St., SE corner Spring Street Arcade	1915	1924	Clayton's Public House
616 S. Broadway	September 15, 1924	1972	Renovated 2018, now office space, restaurant and rooftop bar.

== Branches ==
=== Downtown branches ===
Desmond's would add branch stores starting in 1927 with Seventh and Hope, and would also operate a branch in the Spring Arcade at 543 Spring Street, next door to the Pacific Southwest Trust and Savings Bank on Spring Street, which occupied the site of its former sole store.

=== Suburban growth ===
Notable branch stores
Opened	Closed	City/ district	Location	Sequence	Architects	Notes
1927	1934	W. 7th St.	Roosevelt Bldg., 717 W. 7th St. at Hope	3rd	Curlett and Beelman	Ca. 7,500 sq ft (700 m^{2}). Currently a restaurant, Shoo Shoo Baby.
1929	late 1980	Miracle Mile	5500 Wilshire Bl.	4th	Gilbert Stanley Underwood	Occupied the Wilshire Tower building together with Silverwoods. Now The Desmond on Wilshire, residential building, Architect Underwood was known for nature-inspired designs of lodges in national parks.
Mar 1930		Westwood	1001 Westwood Bl., SW cor. Weyburn	5th	John and Donald Parkinson	Original store (1930) cost $200,000 to build. In 1940, expanded its original store into what it called a $300,000 "tropical Mediterranean-style" store, double the size. Now a CVS.
Aug 21, 1931		Long Beach	140 E. Broadway at Locust	6th		Bought and took over the Dodd & Hillis clothing store.
1934		W. 7th St.	2nd Union Oil Building, 617 W. 7th. St.		Curlett and Beelman	22,500 sq ft (2,090 m^{2}) (1934), expanded to 37,500 sq ft (3,480 m^{2}) in 1937, called "a $400,000 investment". Currently a Walgreens
Nov 14, 1936	2005	Palm Springs	Palm Springs Plaza			Was long a seasonal store.
Mar 1953		Crenshaw District	Broadway-Crenshaw Plaza	7th	Burke, Kober & Nicolais	30,000 sq. ft. on two floors. Largest speciality store in the shopping center.
Jun 1, 1955		Pasadena	440 S. Lake Av.	8th	Burke, Kober & Nicolais	8th store
Sep 17, 1958		Santa Ana	Santa Ana Fashion Square	9th		
Apr 30, 1962		Sherman Oaks	Sherman Oaks Fashion Square	10th		20,000 sq ft (1,900 m^{2})
Apr 30, 1962		West Covina	West Covina Fashion Center	11th		
Oct 16, 1962		Whittier	Whittwood Shopping Center	12th		20,000 sq ft (1,900 m^{2})
Aug 28, 1964		Ventura	Buenaventura Center	13th	Burke, Kober & Nicolais	18,500 sq ft (1,720 m^{2}))
Nov 1964		Lakewood	Lakewood Center	14th		17,000 sq ft (1,600 m^{2})
Mar 1966		Torrance	Del Amo Center	15th	Burke, Kober & Nicolais	
Aug 29, 1966		Glendale	Glendale Fashion Center	16th		
Aug 11, 1967		Santa Barbara	La Cumbre Plaza	17th		Interiors by Burke, Kober and Nicolais
Sep 11, 1967		Newport Beach	Fashion Island			
Oct 1971	1987	Northridge	Northridge Fashion Center			

== Gallery ==
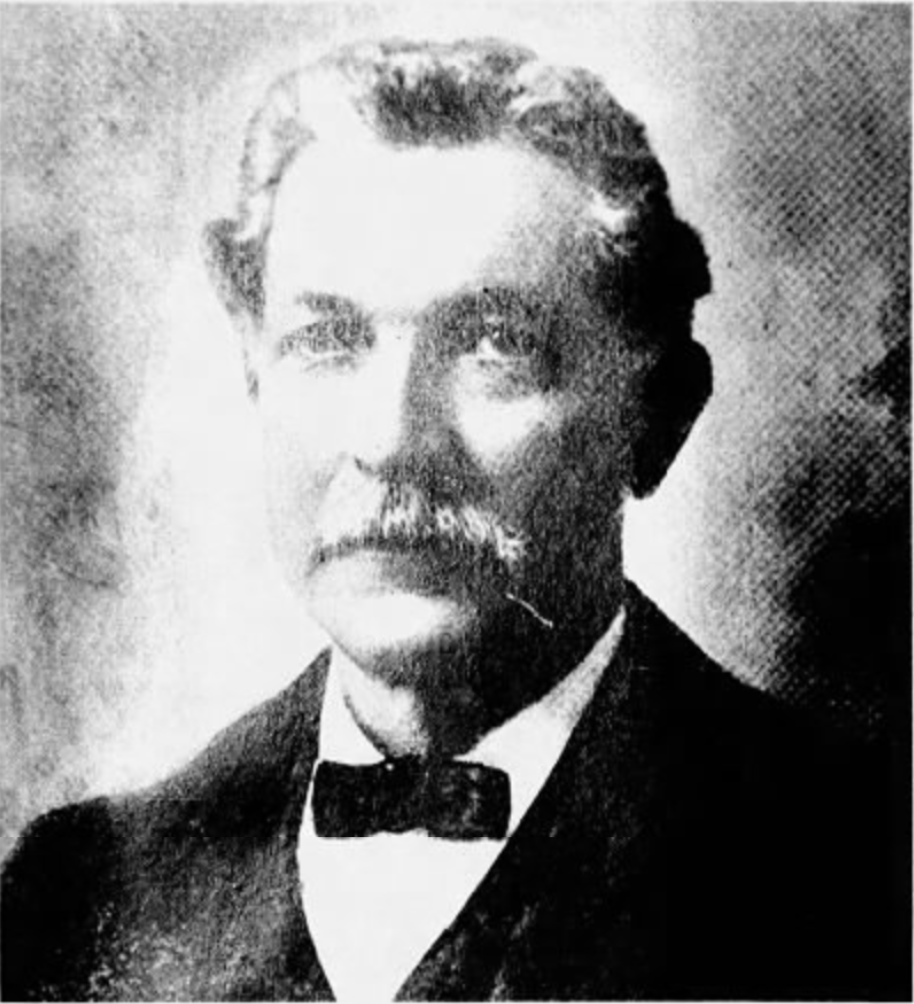
Daniel Desmond

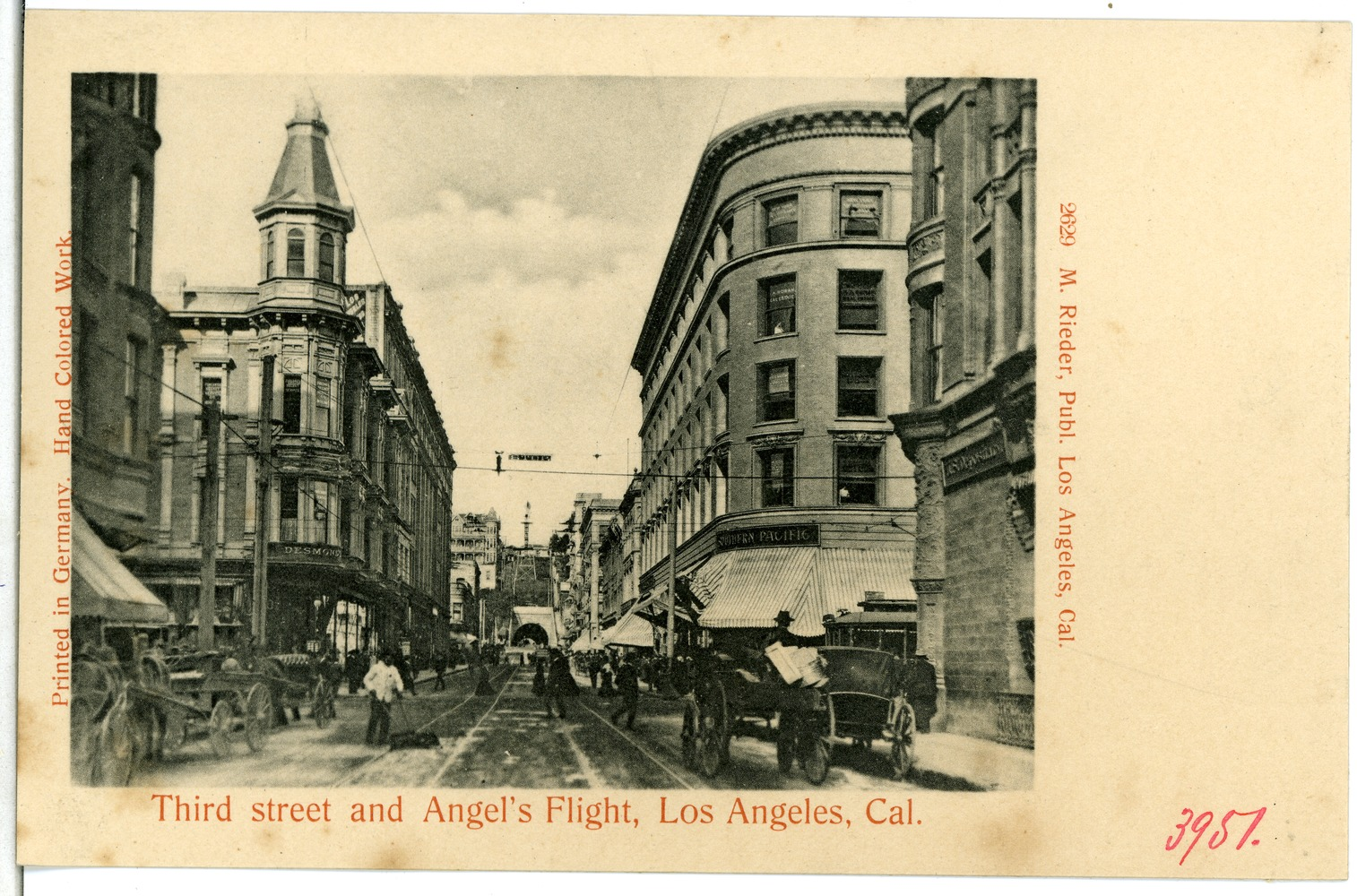
1903: the turreted Hotel Ramona with Desmond's sign

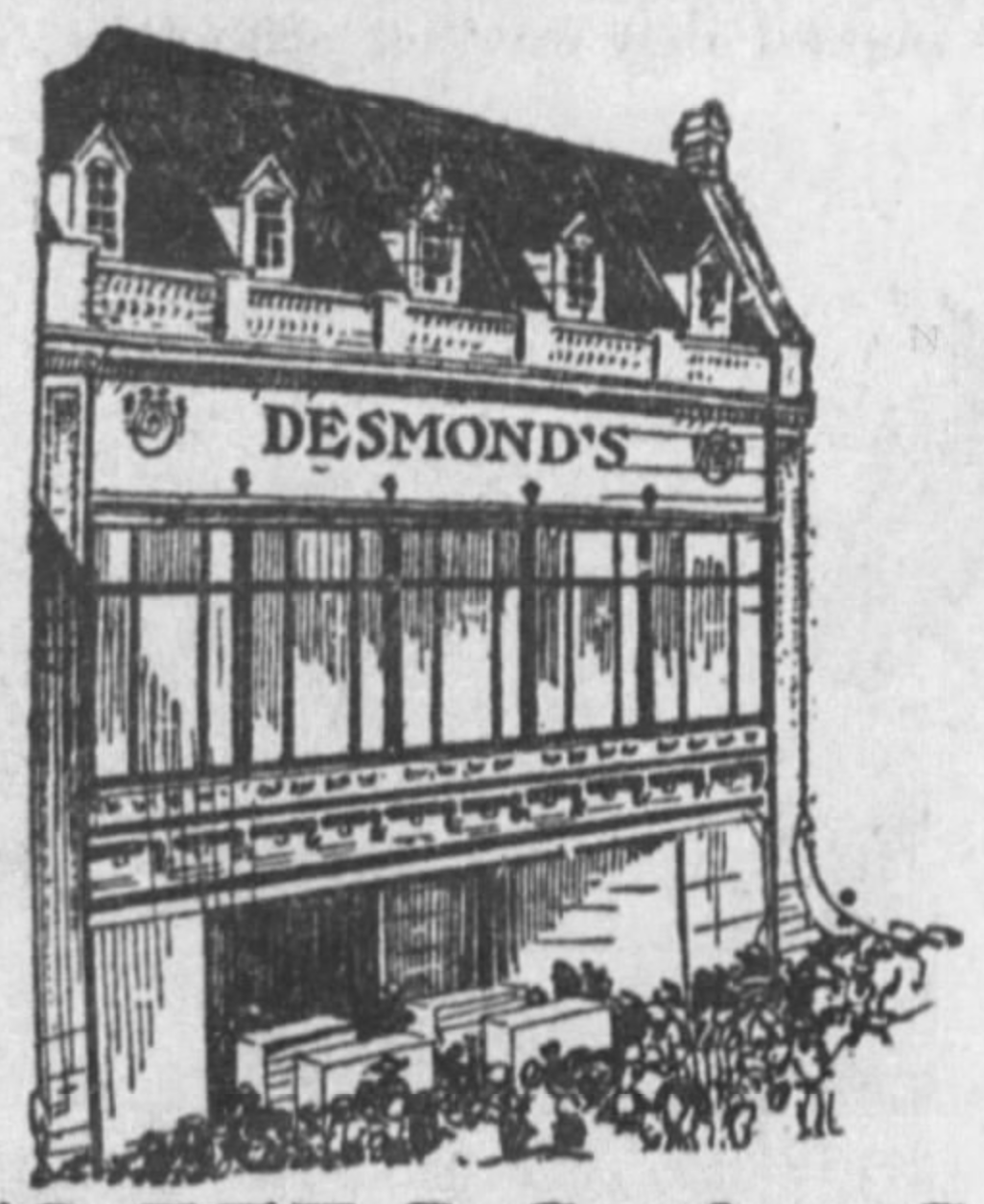
Desmond's Spring Street Store (1915 to 1924)

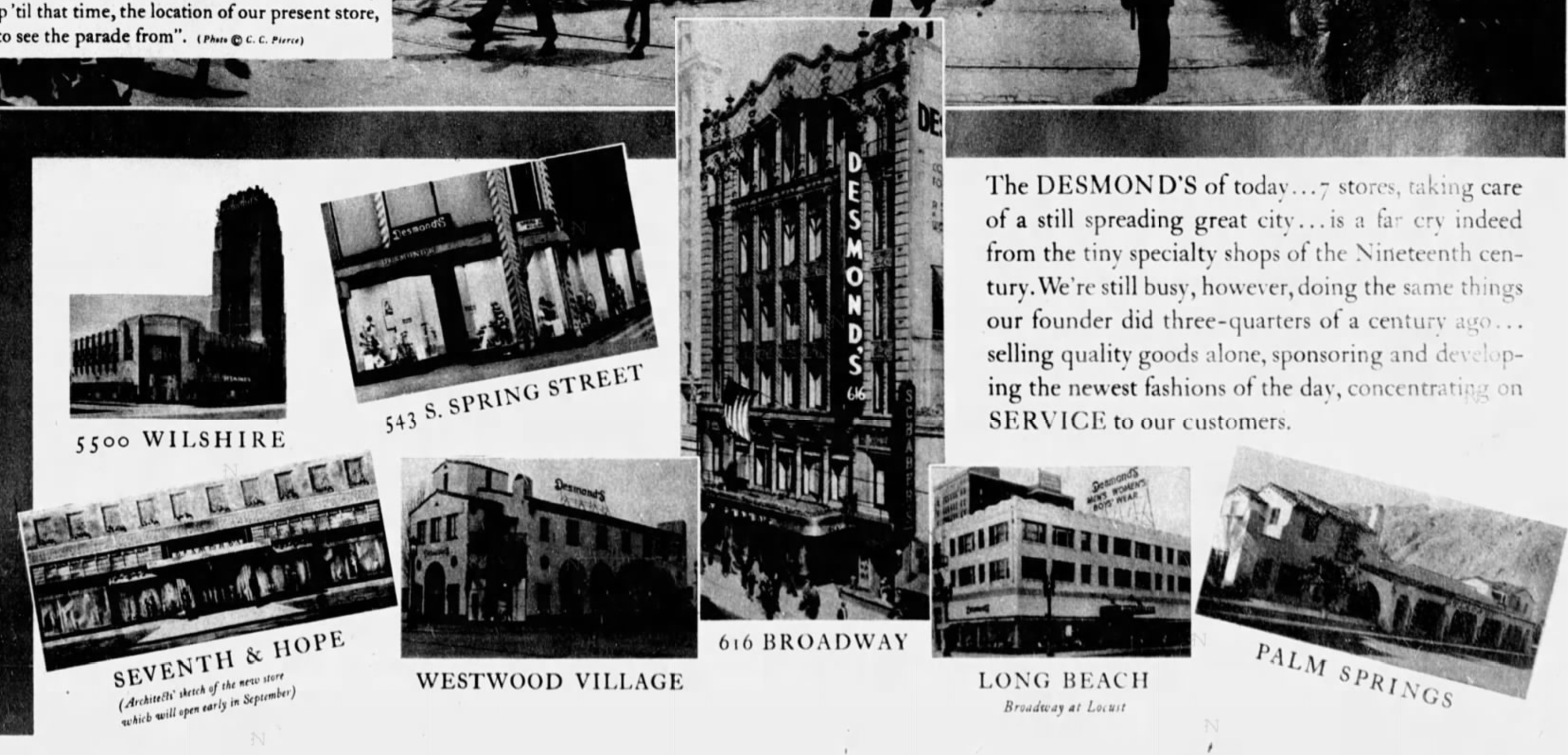
Illustration of various Desmond's store branches from a 1937 ad

== Ownership ==
Ralph R. Huesman, purchased the store from Desmond family heirs in 1921. Fred B. Huesman, his nephew, joined Desmond's five years later. Fred succeeded his uncle as president in 1944 and continued in that position until 1973, when he took the title of chairman. In the early 1960s, New York's Cluett Peabody & Company bought Desmond's.

== 1977–1981 and epilogue ==
In 1977, a joint venture of Bond Clothing Stores and Harold Kapelovitz bought the chain, and Kapelovitz took over the management of Desmond's.

Between 1977 and 1982 Desmond's closed all but four California locations.

Meanwhile, it opened locations across the Western United States:

- Arizona
- Colorado: Mesa Mall, Grand Junction
- Iowa: Southern Hills Mall, Sioux City
- Montana
- North Dakota (2): Dickinson, Bismarck (6,000 square feet, opened 1980, closed 1986)
- Texas (3): Austin, Midland, Odessa
- Wisconsin

Northridge and West Covina stores continued operating until 1986.

Kapelovitz sold the Palm Springs La Plaza store to Frank Gross and Stanlee McNeish, and it continued under the Desmond's name until 2005. A separate "Desmond's Big and Tall" Store in Palm Desert Town Center continued operating after that time.

=== Desmonds, Inc. post-1981 ===
Desmond's Inc. continued as a company after the Desmond's chain was closed, purchasing San Diego–based Walker Scott in 1985 and liquidating it the next year; and hired to manage the liquidation of Babbitts department store in Flagstaff, Arizona in 1987.
