= Anaheim Town Square =

Community shopping center in Anaheim, California

Coordinates: 33.8385°N 117.8864°W

Anaheim Town Square (originally East Anaheim Shopping Center, later East Anaheim Center, East Anaheim Plaza), is a 372,185-square-foot (34,577 m^{2}) community shopping center, the largest center in East Anaheim, California which was built at the intersection of Anaheim-Olive Road (renamed Lincoln Avenue in 1962) and Placentia Avenue (now State College Boulevard).

The center began construction in 1953 with 140,000 square feet (13,000 m^{2}) on 16.75 acres, with Alpha Beta supermarket opening in March 1954, and shortly thereafter a Woolworth variety store, a Sav-on Drug Store at no. 2120 on July 11, 1957, a 17,500 sq ft (1,630 m^{2}) W.T. Grant variety store opening on February 27, 1958.

The center underwent a major expansion to 302,600 sq ft (28,110 m^{2}), adding a 40,000 sq ft (3,700 m^{2}) Boston Stores junior department store on November 14, 1968. W. T. Grant moved to a new 86,800-square-foot (8,060 m^{2}) building that opened on October 24, 1968, more than quadrupling its space. Architects Burke, Nicolai and Archuleta designed both. East Anaheim Shopping Center also added a Jolly Roger restaurant and a branch of the Commercial National Bank. In 1968 the center sales volume was $20,000,000. As of 1970 there were 42 stores and parking for 2000 cars, and the anchor supermarket had changed to Thriftimart.

The Boston Store branch was rebuilt in 1984.

In mid-2017, the Kmart closed and was replaced by a 40,000 square feet (3,700 m^{2}) small-format Target store.

As of 2019, the center has 372,185 square feet (34,577 m^{2}) of gross leasable area, with anchors Target, Hispanic-focused supermarket Northgate Market (the population was 69% Hispanic within a 1-mile radius in 2018), Ross Dress for Less, Goodwill, Pep Boys, a United States Post Office, and discount stores 99 Cents Only Stores and Five Below.
