= Daniel Desmond (disambiguation) =

Daniel Desmond (1833–1903) was an Irish-American retail store owner.

Daniel Desmond may also refer to:

- Dan Desmond (1913–1964), Irish politician
- Dan Desmond (born 1944), American actor, known for Mississippi Burning
- Daniel Francis Desmond (1884–1945), American prelate of the Roman Catholic Church
