= Anaheim Plaza =

- Coordinates: 33.8388832°N 117.9396274°W
- Address: 510 North Euclid Street, Anaheim, CA 92801, USA
- Opened: October 14, 1955 (Broadway), as power center 1994
- Closed: 1993 (original indoor mall)
- Manager: Kimco Realty
- Architect: Welton Becket
- Num. of stores: 28
- Num. of anchor tenants: 5
- Public transit: OCTA Route 37
- Website: shopanaheimplaza.com

Location in northern Orange County

Anaheim Plaza, originally Broadway Orange County Center, then Anaheim Center, in Anaheim, California, was the first shopping mall in Orange County. It was a regional mall from 1955 to 1993 and is now a power center anchored by big-box stores.

The Broadway was the original anchor department store opening October 14, 1955, with the mall shops opening gradually in the following weeks and months. Both The Broadway and the center as a whole were designed by renowned Los Angeles architect Welton Becket. The store cost $8.5 million to build, was 208,000 square feet (19,300 m^{2}) in size, employed around 1,000 people and had parking for 5,000 cars. Brown McPherson was the first store manager

In February 1963, a J.W. Robinson's was added as the mall's second anchor store.

In 1974, the center's owner, Prudential Life Insurance Co., completed a $4 million renovation, including enclosing the center and renaming it Anaheim Plaza. In July 1977, a Mervyn's was added as the mall's third anchor store.

By the 1980s, better-off patrons had moved out of the surrounding area for Anaheim Hills and southern Orange County and the area were becoming more working-class and Hispanic. In September 1987, business at Anaheim Plaza started to decline which was caused by the grand opening of MainPlace Mall in nearby Santa Ana, California. Robinson's opened a store at MainPlace Mall also in September 1987 and closed its Anaheim Plaza store in January 1988. By 1992, the mall was only 35% occupied. In January 1993, the mall's original anchor store The Broadway closed for good and in August of that same year, the mall was bulldozed except for the Mervyn's store.

A new strip mall, all new except for the Mervyn's, was opened in November 1994, 547,000 square feet (50,800 m^{2}) in size and costing $30 million. Mervyn's closed in late 2008 due to the chain being liquidated and has been replaced by Forever 21 (now closed since 2020, now Burlington).

Currently (as of 2023), anchor stores include El Super (formerly OSH and Gigante), Smart & Final (formerly OfficeMax), Petco, Ross, TJ Maxx (formerly CompUSA), Walmart (which opened in January 1995), and Burlington Coat Factory (former Mervyn's and Forever 21).
