= J. W. Robinson's =

American department store chain

J. W. Robinson & Co.
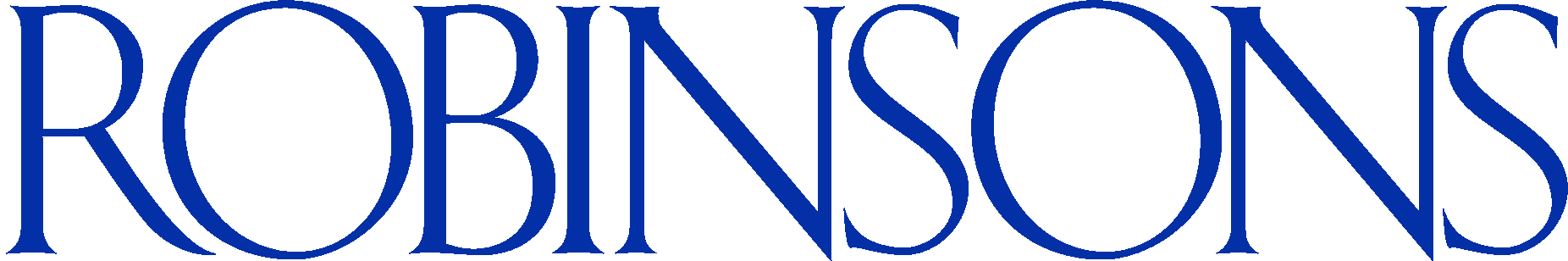

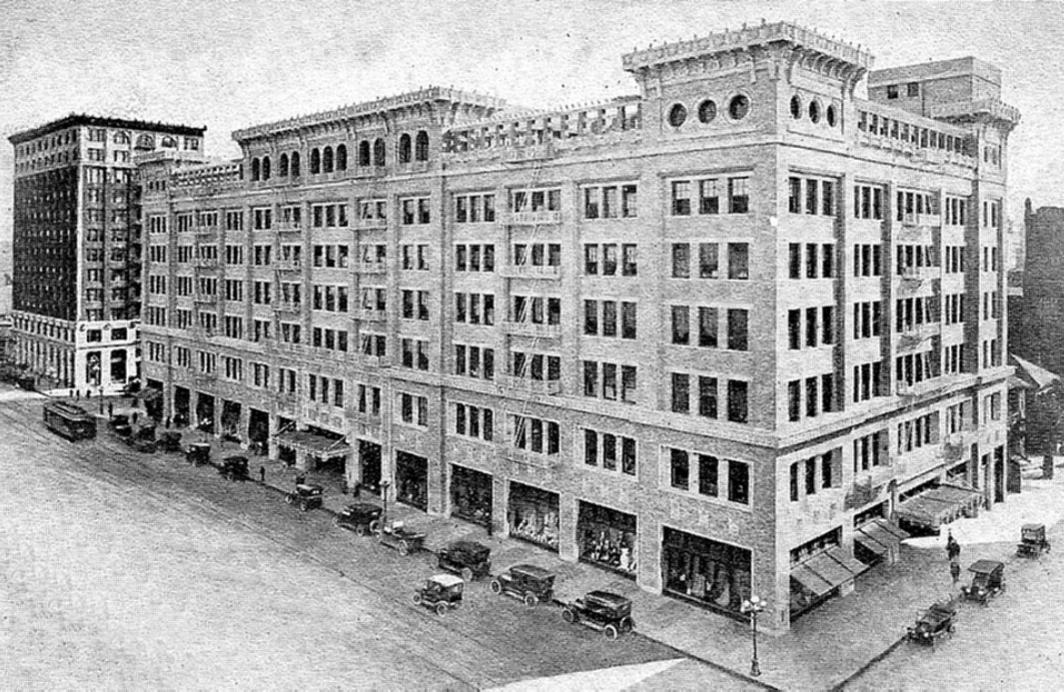
- Exterior of the former flagship store on 7th Street in Los Angeles (1915)
- Formerly: Boston Dry Goods Store; J. W. Robinson Co.
- Type: Division
- Industry: Retail
- Genre: Department stores
- Founded: 1883; 143 years ago in Los Angeles, California, United States
- Founder: Joseph Winchester Robinson
- Defunct: January 31, 1993; 33 years ago
- Fate: Merged with May Company California
- Successor: Robinsons-May
- Headquarters: Los Angeles, California, United States
- Products: Clothing; footwear; bedding; furniture; jewelry; beauty products; housewares
- Parent: Associated Dry Goods (1957–1986); The May Department Stores Company (1986–1993)

J. W. Robinson & Co. (colloquially Robinson's) was an American department store chain founded in 1883 by Joseph Winchester Robinson. Its flagship store and headquarters were located in Los Angeles, California, and operated in Southern California and Arizona. Robinson's and May Company California were merged and individually dissolved to form Robinsons-May in 1993.

== 19th-century history ==
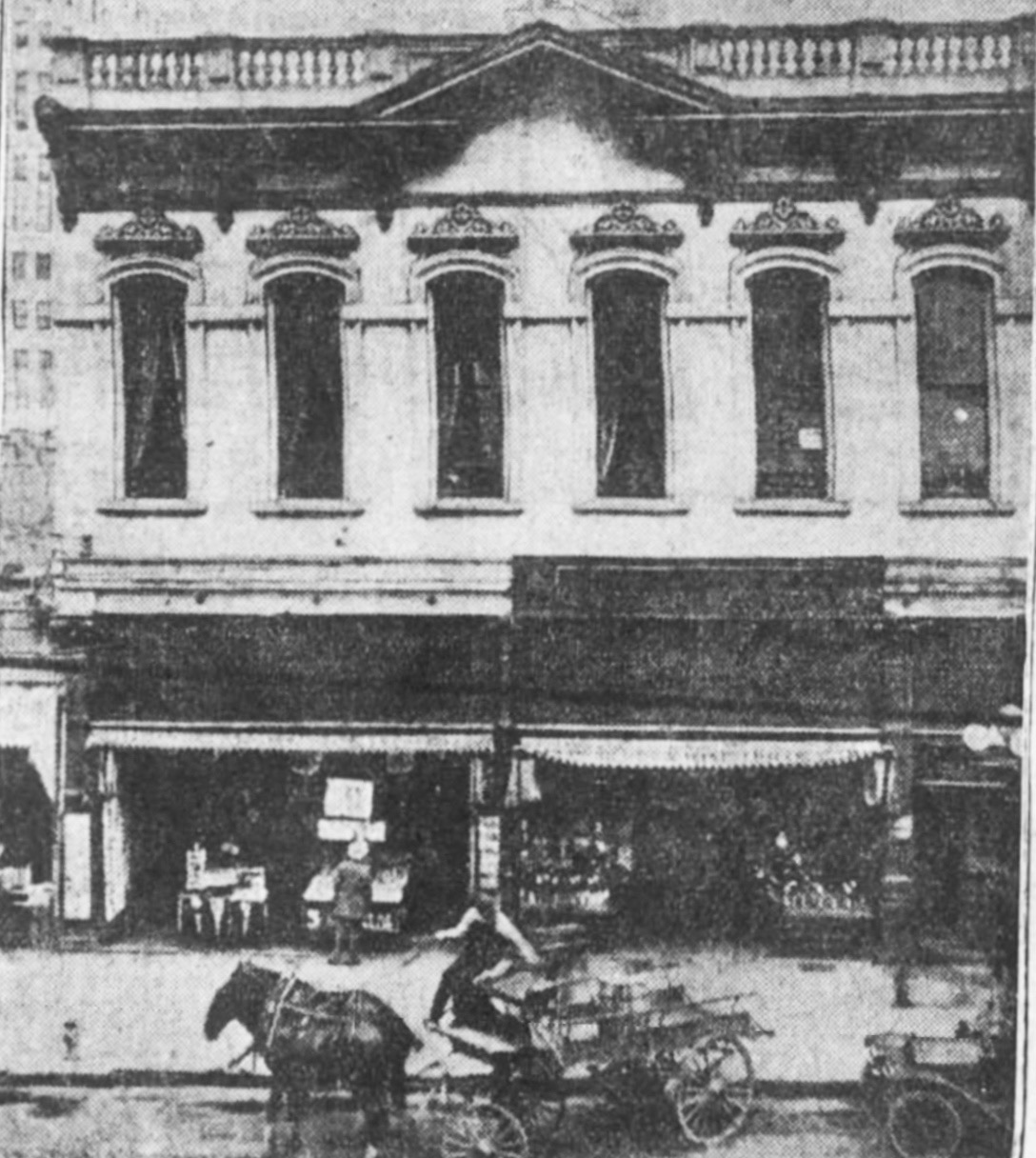
Boston Dry Goods (J. W. Robinson Co.) home from 1886 to 1895 at Jones Block, 171–173 N. Spring Street (post-1890 numbering)

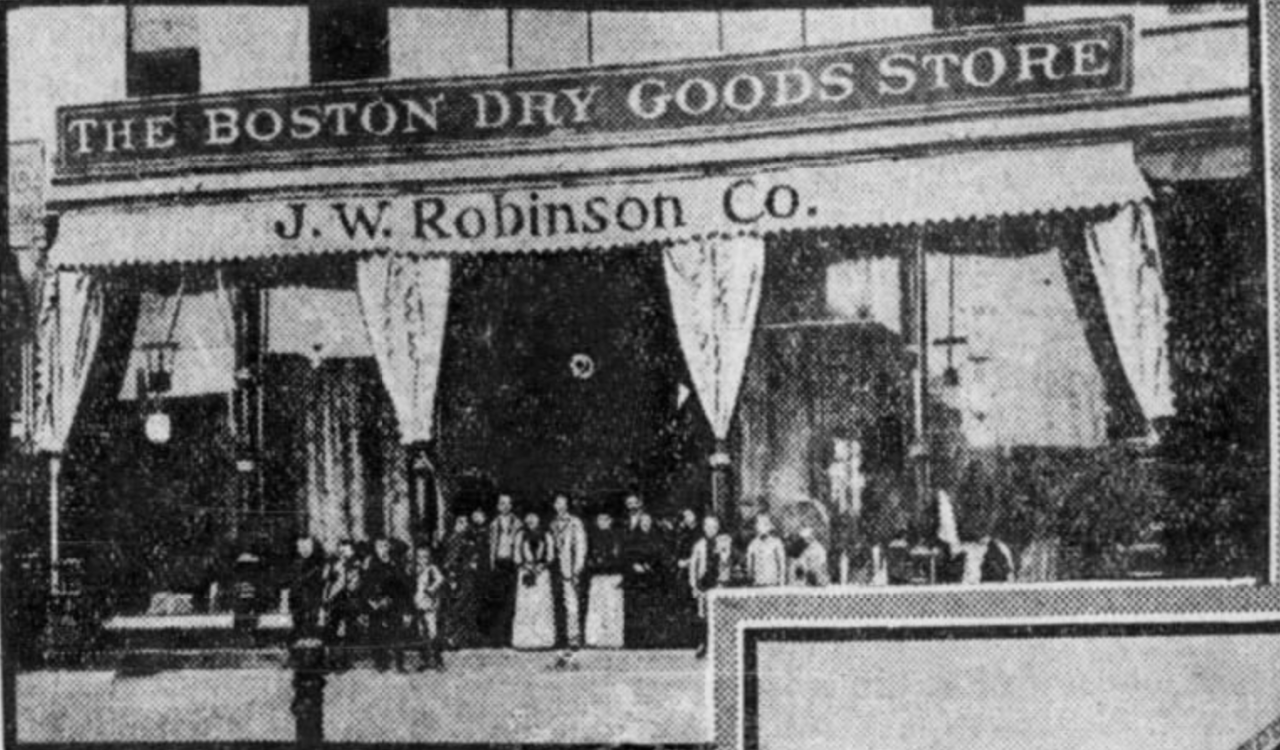
Another view of the Spring Street store, c.1887

Joseph Winchester Robinson was a merchant from Waltham, Massachusetts who moved to Rosemead, California in 1882 to develop orange groves. Robinson found the quality of goods and service from local merchants lacking, and reentered the retail business, utilizing his contacts on the East Coast to deliver superior merchandise.

Robinson opened the 1,440 sq ft (134 m^{2}) Boston Dry Goods Store in 1883 at the Allen Block at the southwest corner of Spring and Temple streets, stating that his store offered "fine stocks and refined 'Boston' service." In 1891, J. W. Robinson died at the age of 44 and his father, Henry Winchester Robinson, came from Boston to Los Angeles to take over the business, and the "Boston Dry Goods Store" was renamed the "J. W. Robinson Company" in honor of its late founder.

In 1887, J.W. Robinson Co.'s Boston Dry Goods Store moved to a new store of around 3,000 sq ft (280 m^{2}) in the Jones Block at 171–173 (post-1890 numbering) Spring Street, considered an adventurous move because at that time, the location was far from the central business district of that period. When Robinson's moved again in 1895, Nathaniel Blackstone, brother-in-law of J.W. Robinson, moved into the vacated space and founded Blackstone's Dry Goods, which would become a single-location downtown department store in its own right.

Mr. C. W. R. Ford, who had owned his own wholesale store at 522 Market Street in San Francisco, married Robinson's widow and took over as president of the Robinson's company.

== 20th-century history ==
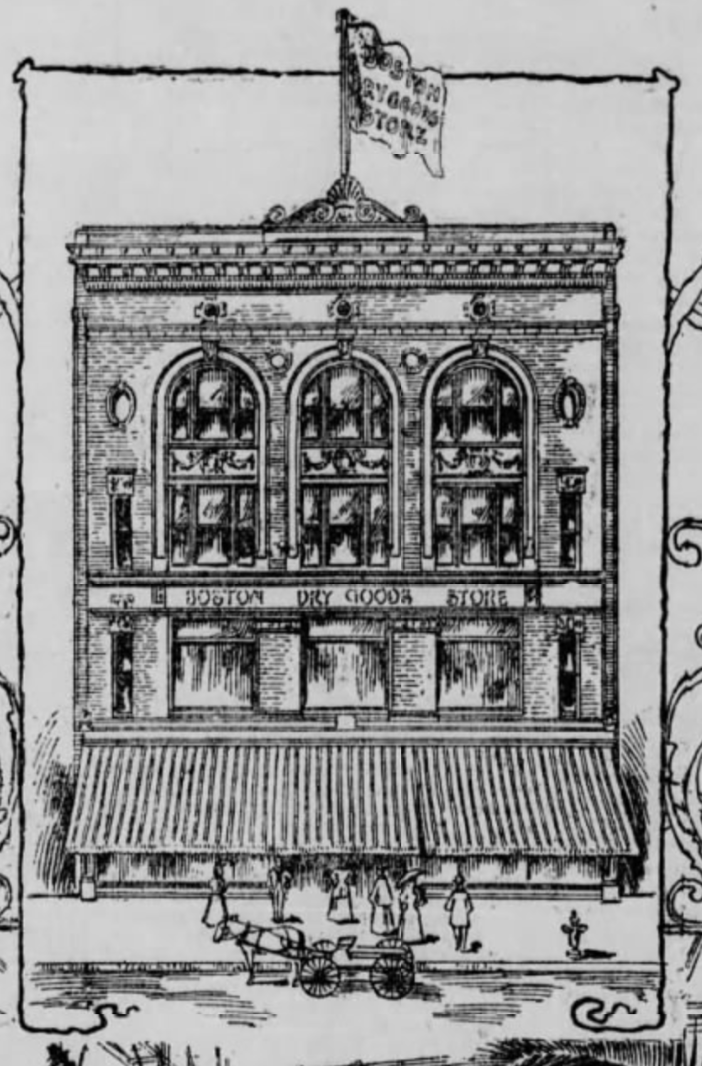
Boston Dry Goods (J. W. Robinson Co.) new store, 1895, 239 S. Broadway, Los Angeles

From 1880 to 1890, the population of Los Angeles doubled from 50,395 to 102,479 people. In January 1895 the J. W. Robinson Co., which by that time advertised simply as "The Boston Store", announced that after only eight years at Spring Street, more spacious quarters were necessary, and that a new four-story "Boston Dry Goods Store Building" was under construction at 239 S. Broadway (razed, currently site of a parking lot), opposite the then City Hall. It was designed by Theodore Eisen and Sumner Hunt, designer of the Bradbury Building. On October 1, 1895, Robinson's opened the new store. The new building was promoted at the time as a sign that Los Angeles had come into its own as a "metropolitan center" and that it was no longer necessary to make "annual pilgrimages to San Francisco" to obtain a wide selection of fine merchandise.

The front was "Grecian" (Greek Revival) in style, of light cream brick and terra cotta. It featured an elaborate Corinthian-style cornice crowning the façade. Above it rose a high parapet broken by a high-relief entresol panel. All of this was surmounted by elaborate acroteria. 60-foot-long, 19.5-foot-high plate glass windows illuminated the ground floor. Just above the second floor the façade was Colonial style and above that Doric-style features. The building had passenger and freight elevators, and skylights illuminated through to the ground floor. The first/ground floor and part of the basement were devoted to retail with a central cashier's and wrapping desk, offices were also on the ground floor, receiving and shipping were also in the basement, while the two upper floors housed the main part of the manufacturing and wholesale departments, which moved down from Temple Street. The second floor housed various merchandise departments, areas to display delicate fabrics under gas light, a desk with stationery for customers to write, and the ladies' "parlors" (restrooms). In 1908 the store opened up a 5-story extension at the back, fronting on Hill Street. The architect was Theodore Eisen.

=== Flagship store construction ===
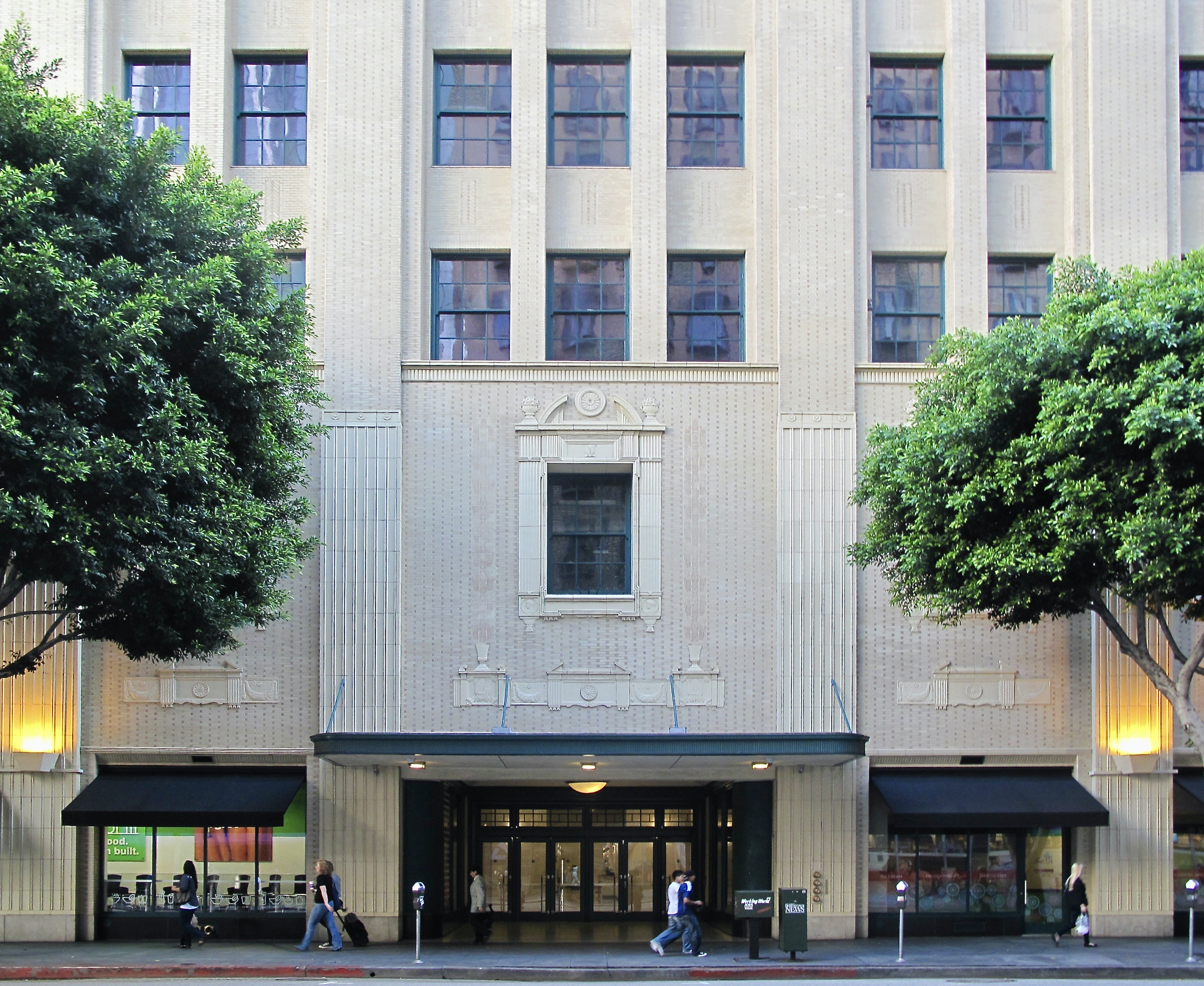
J. W. Robinson's 1915-1993 flagship store (façade from 1934), 600 W. 7th St.

As Los Angeles continued to grow, so did Robinson's business and in 1914 it announced its construction of a new $1,000,000, (~$23.7 million in 2025) seven-story flagship store with over nine acres (400,000 square feet (37,000 m^{2})) of floor space, along the south side of West Seventh Street stretching alone the complete block between Grand and Hope streets. Frederick Noonan and William J. Dodd were the architects. The store opened on September 7, 1915. The building was expanded to the south in 1923 at a cost of $900,000 (~$13.2 million in 2025), Dodd and Richard, architects, for a total of 623,700 square feet (57,940 m^{2}). In 1934, the building was remodeled for between $100,000 (~$1.88 million in 2025)–200,000 to a "restrained Modernistic" exterior, shedding some its more exuberant Art Deco features and adding more parking facilities. Robinson's was the largest store of what became a new upscale Seventh Street shopping district to the southwest of the concentration of department stores along Broadway, with Ville de Paris (later B. H. Dyas), Coulter's, Haggarty's, and Desmond's opening stores nearby. The Robinson's store closed in 1993 and the building, 600 West Seventh Street, currently houses telecommunications (voice, data and internet servers), offices and ground-floor retail.

The store contained the following departments:

- First (ground) floor: ribbons, parasols, umbrellas, laces and trimmings, lace neckwear, feather boas, ceilings, gloves, handkerchiefs, fancy boas, fancy hairpins and combs, jewelry, leather goods, stationery, men's furnishings, boys' furnishings and clothing, "bargain square"
- Second floor: art needlework, linens, sheetings, wash goods, linings, silk dress good patterns, ladies' restrooms, design room, beauty parlors and shoe shining dept.
- Third floor: cloak and suit for misses and ladies, French room for imported gowns and hats, baby shop for fine layette materials and outfitting, mourning goods, children's dresses, petticoats, blouses, millinery, sweaters, bathing suits, kimono, bathrobes, house dresses, corsets, knit underwear, muslin underwear and aprons
- Fourth floor: rugs, draperies, pictures, brasses, statuary, cut glass, art porcelains and toys
- Fifth floor: offices, auditorium, alteration dept. and workrooms
- Sixth floor: hospital and reserve stockroom
- Seventh floor. employee cafeteria, two outdoor "courts", women's employee restroom, large "court" and lounge for men
- Seventh/top floor: roof garden and café

=== Acquisition by ADG and expansion ===
Associated Dry Goods (ADG) bought Robinson's in 1955 (the term used by CEO Edward R. Valentine in the press was that Robinson's "affiliated with" ADG.) At that time the chain's sales were $32.5 million annually, with $12 million coming from the Beverly Hills branch.

Unlike competitors Bullock's, Desmond's, I. Magnin and Silverwoods, in the 1930s and 1940s, Robinson's did not establish branches in the outlying upscale retail districts such as Wilshire Boulevard, Pasadena, or Westwood, except for a small Palm Springs shop at the Desert Inn that was originally a Bullock's. Only starting in 1952 did it open its first of what would become about 30 branches, in Beverly Hills (see below).

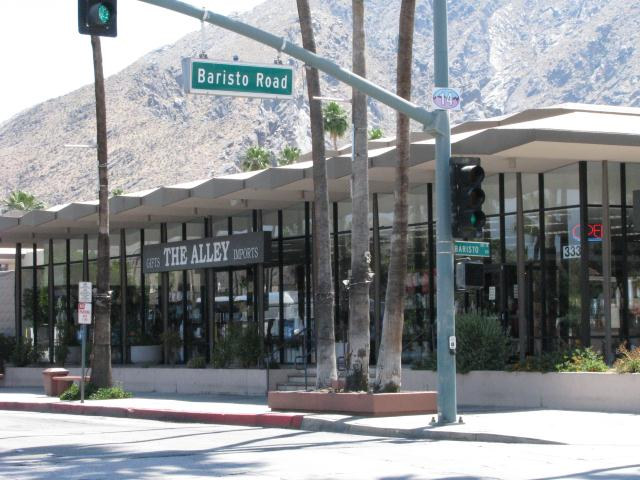
Robinson's in Palm Springs, opened 1958

The second Robinson's store was opened in Beverly Hills in 1952 near the corner of Wilshire Boulevard at Santa Monica Boulevard, across a courtyard from the Beverly Hilton Hotel (1953). A small Mid-Century modern style "open in winter only" store followed in Palm Springs. A store on Colorado Boulevard in Pasadena followed. The store in Pasadena was the last free standing store as the concept of the shopping mall began to take off. The first stores adjacent or connected to shopping malls opened in Panorama City in the San Fernando Valley (late 1950s), Anaheim Plaza, on upper State Street in Santa Barbara (1960s), and Glendale. The Santa Barbara store and the Newport Beach stores in malls, but essentially free standing buildings. By the time J.W. Robinson's was dissolved into Robinson's-May there were almost 30 stores across Southern California from San Diego to Palm Desert to Santa Barbara.

Associated Dry Goods (ADG), a group of independently operated department store chains, bought Robinson's in 1957.

=== Acquisition by May and conversion to Robinsons-May ===
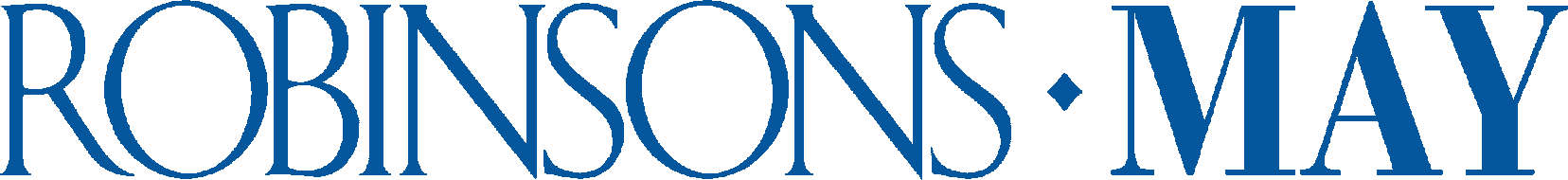
Robinson's-May Company merger logo

May Department Stores bought Associated Dry Goods and with it, Robinson's, in 1986. In 1989, May dissolved its Scottsdale, Arizona-based Goldwaters division, folding it into Robinson's, and its Phoenix-area stores were rebranded as Robinson's.

In 1992, May combined Robinson's and May Company California into a single brand, Robinsons-May. The Robinson's stores became, like the former May Co. locations, mid-range department stores, which market research firm NPD Group characterized as having an "identity crisis" because "they tried to be something for everyone and ended up being nothing for anyone". Federated Department Stores (which had bought Macy's in 1994 and changed its name in 2007 to Macy's, Inc.) bought May Department Stores in 2005. Robinson's-May was dissolved in 2005–6, and the former Robinson's stores were closed, sold, or turned into Macy's or Bloomingdale's branches.

== Stores ==
California and Arizona Robinson's stores at merger with May Co. into Robinsons-May, 1992-3

Community	Mall or address	Opened	Closed	Square feet	Square meters	Notes
California
1 Downtown Los Angeles (1915 store)	Seventh, Hope & Grand	September 7, 1915	February 1993	1915: 400,000; 1923: 623,700	1915: 37,000; 1923: 57,940	Frederick Noonan and William Richards of Dodd & Richards, architects.
2 Beverly Hills	9900 Wilshire Boulevard in a complex with the Beverly Hilton	February 13, 1952	2006	236,000	21,900	Demolished 2014. Architects William Pereira and Charles Luckman. Interiors by Raymond Loewy. Site of One Beverly Hills (Richard Meier & Partners, architects).
3 Palm Springs	333 South Palm Canyon Drive	January 10, 1958	1987			Architects William Pereira and Charles Luckman. Interiors by Raymond Loewy. Expanded 1973. Currently used as "CAMP Community and Meeting Place".
4 Pasadena	777 East Colorado Boulevard	May 12, 1958	February 1993			Architects William Pereira and Charles Luckman. Interiors by Raymond Loewy. Had a parking structure for 700 cars. Is now a Target.
5 Panorama City	Van Nuys at Chase, Panorama City Shopping Center	June 27, 1961		169,000	15,700	
6 Anaheim	Anaheim Plaza	February 1963	January 1988			Closed six months after the one at MainPlace Mall in Santa Ana, California opened.
7 Glendale	Glendale Fashion Center	August 1966	February 1993	150,000	14,000	
8 Santa Barbara	La Cumbre Plaza	July 1967		155,000	14,400	To be demolished, 2028 after the city hired someone to write an extremely biased report which opined that the three-story, 1967 building has no historical significance architecturally, due to the era in which built, nor by association with any prominent individual.
9 Newport Beach	Fashion Island	September 1967		225,000	20,900	
10 San Diego	Fashion Valley Mall	September 1969		172,000	16,000	Now operates as a Bloomingdale's.
11 Cerritos	Los Cerritos Center	September 1971		146,000	13,600	To Robinsons-May in 1993, closed 2006, became Nordstrom in 2010.
12 Woodland Hills	Woodland Hills Promenade	March 1973	February 1993	194,000	18,000	Became Bullock's, later Macy's.
13 Puente Hills	Puente Hills Mall, City of Industry	March 1974		153,000	14,200	Location seen in the "Twin Pines Mall" scenes of Back to the Future.
14 Westminster	Westminster Mall	April 1975	February 1993	160,000	15,000	Became JCPenney.
15 Santa Anita	Santa Anita Fashion Park (now The Shops at Santa Anita), Arcadia	April 19, 1976		137,000	12,700	To Robinsons-May in 1993, closed 2006, became Forever 21 in Nov. 2012.
16 Thousand Oaks	The Oaks	1978		127,000	11,800	
17 UTC	University Towne Center, La Jolla, San Diego	1978		147,000	13,700	
18 Mission Viejo	Mission Viejo Mall	1979				
19 Santa Monica	Santa Monica Place	1980				
20 Sherman Oaks	Sherman Oaks Galleria	1980				
21 Del Amo	Del Amo Fashion Center, Torrance	1981				
23 Horton Plaza	Horton Plaza, San Diego	1985				
24 Escondido	North County Fair	1986				
25 South Coast Plaza	South Coast Plaza (Crystal Court), Costa Mesa	1986				
26 Palm Desert	Palm Desert Town Center, now The Shops at Palm Desert	1986				To Robinsons-May in 1993, moved, became Sears in Nov. 2004.
27 Santa Ana	MainPlace	1987				
28 Brea	Brea Mall	May 1991	February 1993			Became JCPenney.
Arizona (All previously Goldwater's)
Mesa	Fiesta Mall					
Phoenix	Metrocenter Mall					
Phoenix	Paradise Valley Mall					
Phoenix	Park Central Mall		1990			
Scottsdale	Scottsdale Fashion Square					

== Expansions ==
=== Japan ===
In addition, just before the acquisition by May, it had also cooperated with Ito-Yokado to form Robinson's Japan, with one location in Kasukabe, Saitama. In 2009, Robinson's Japan was acquired by Seven & I Holdings Co.

=== Robinson's Florida ===
Starting in 1972 ADG borrowed the Robinson's name to open a separate division of department stores, Robinson's of Florida, on Florida's Gulf Coast and Orlando, based in St. Petersburg, Florida. It had been founded in the 1970s as an attempt by ADG to emulate its upscale J. W. Robinson's' stores on the fast-growing Florida Gulf Coast. This newly created division grew to 10 locations. May sold this division in 1987 to Maison Blanche. Seven of the former Robinson's of Florida locations were subsequently sold by Maison Blanche to Dillard's* in 1991 while the other three became Gayfers** (which in turn was bought out by Dillard's in 1998).

== See also ==
- List of department stores converted to Macy's
