= Whittwood Town Center =

- Location: Whittier, California, United States
- Coordinates: 33.9435°N 117.9941°W
- Address: 15466 Whittier Blvd.
- Opened: 1961 (original indoor mall)
- Closed: 2004 (original indoor mall)
- Manager: Kimco Realty Corporation
- Owner: Kimco Realty Corporation
- Num. of anchor tenants: 9
- Floor area: 44,337 sq ft (4,119.0 m^{2})
- Floors: 1 (2 in Kohl's, 3 in Sears; 3rd floor was closed)
- Public transit: LA Metro 120 Montebello Bus Lines: 10; Foothill Transit: 285 Sunshine Shuttle: A, B
- Website: whittwoodtowncenter.com

Whittwood Town Center (formerly Whitwood Shopping Center or Whitwood Center) is a 65-acre open-air shopping center in Whittier, Southeast Los Angeles County, California, located on the southwest corner of Whittier Boulevard and Santa Gertrudes Avenue.

The shopping center has a gross leasable area of 841,936 square feet and is close to Interstate 605, Interstate 5, and the Pomona Freeway. Anchor stores include CVS Pharmacy, JCPenney, Sears (closing July 26, 2025) (formerly The Broadway), Kohl's, PetSmart, and Target.

== History ==
Whittwood was built in the 1961 as a competitor to The Quad at Whittier. It had three anchor tenants: JCPenney on the east, The Broadway on the west, and in between, Myers Whittwood, owned by Boston Stores and rebranded "Boston Stores" in 1976.

Sav-On was located across the northeast mall entrance from JCPenney.

Desmond's opened a 20,000 sq ft (1,900 m^{2}) store in October 1962, its twelfth and the third that it opened in 1962.

Whittwood was originally an open-air mall, which was initially a success.

In the late 1970s, it was renovated and transformed into an enclosed mall. Mervyn's was added as a fourth anchor in the 1980s near The Broadway, giving the mall an "L" shape and adding additional small stores between The Broadway and Mervyn's. A food court was added near the entrance in the center of the mall on its southern side. Also in the 1980s, Mimi's Cafe was added as a standalone building in the northern part of the mall's massive parking lot. This would be the first of many standalone restaurants that would be added to the northern parking lot. Black Angus followed in the 1990s, and the rest of the single-occupant restaurant buildings in the north lot were added after the 2004 renovation. The exterior was remodeled in the late 1980s to lure businesses from The Quad, which had recently closed after being damaged by the 1987 Whittier Narrows earthquake. Krikorian Theatres opened a 10-screen Premium movie theater complex on the back lot, which was later sold to Regal Cinemas. The theater closed in the mid-1990s. Boston Store closed down in the 1990s and wasn't replaced by a new anchor. In 1996, Federated Department Stores bought out The Broadway and decided not to convert the Whittwood store to a Macy's for unknown reasons. It was closed and sold to Sears, which moved in by November of that year.

The mall closed in 2004, with the three separate anchors remaining open. Mervyn's went out of business at the end of 2008 and was replaced by Kohl's in 2009. The only shop open left in the central mall building was Sav-On, now replaced by CVS Pharmacy. Not long after, the entire enclosed building that had connected the three remaining anchors was demolished, returning the JCPenney and Sears buildings to standalone buildings and making the Kohl's building a standalone building for the first time ever (when it was constructed, it was connected to the mall). CVS Pharmacy (the former Sav-On) moved to a new location in one of the many smaller newly built buildings within the mall property. Sears will close its doors on July 26, 2025.

The mall was replaced by a new town center containing big box retailers, and new condos were built where the former theater was.

== Transit Access ==
There is a bus terminal on the property served by LA Metro route 120, Montebello Bus Lines route 10, Foothill Transit route 285, and Sunshine Shuttle routes A and B. The bus terminal is located to the west of Sears.
