= Desmond's Building =

Building in Los Angeles, California

- U.S. Historic district – Contributing property
- Los Angeles Historic-Cultural Monument
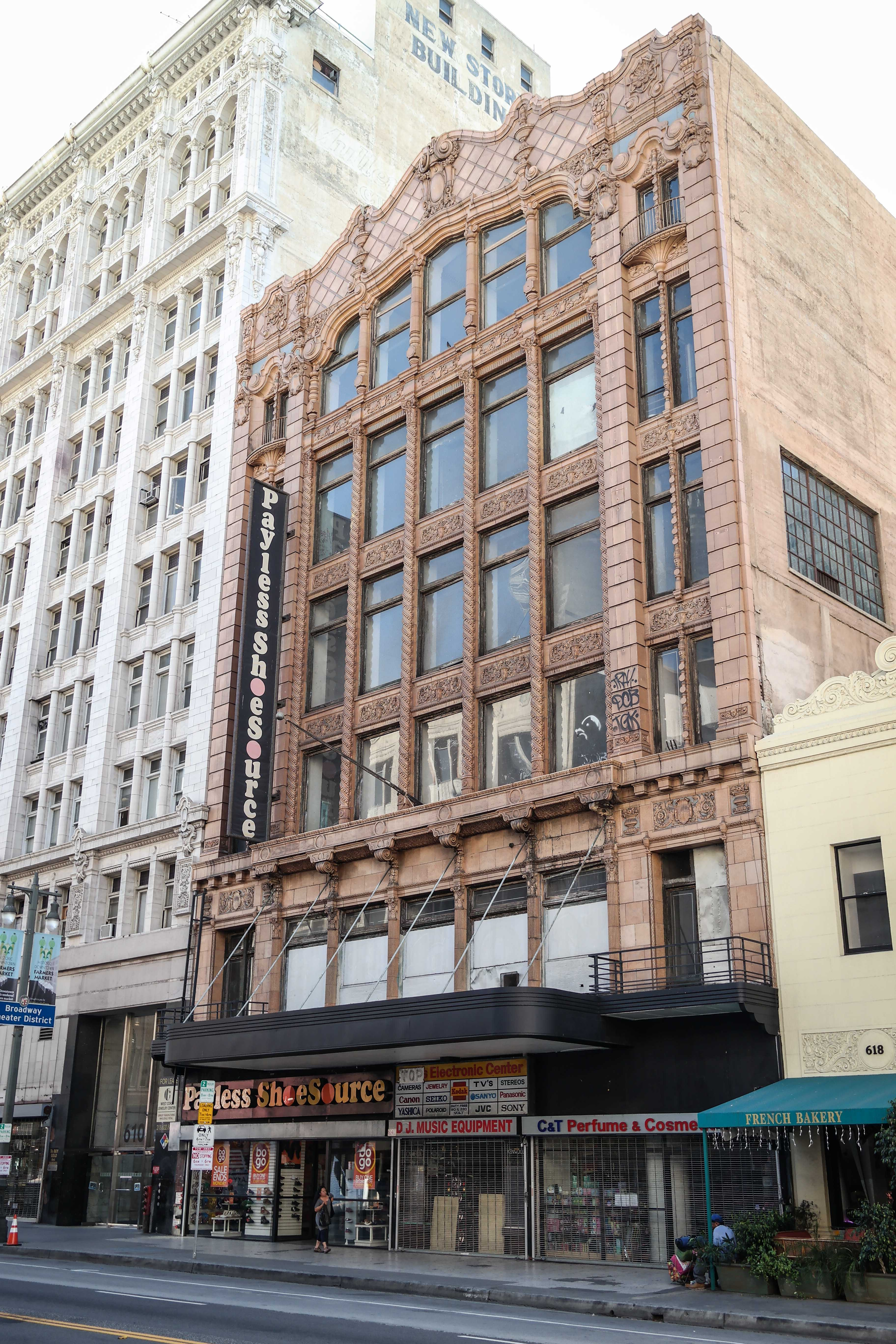
- The building in 2014

- Location within the Los Angeles metropolitan area
- Location: 614 S. Broadway, Los Angeles, California
- Coordinates: 34°02′46″N 118°15′08″W
- Built: 1924
- Architect: Albert C. Martin Sr.
- Architectural style: Spanish Baroque
- Part of: Broadway Theater and Commercial District (ID79000484)
- LAHCM No.: 1207

Significant dates
- Designated CP: May 9, 1979
- Designated LAHCM: September 15, 2020

Desmond's Building, also known as Desmond's Department Store, is a historic six-story building located at 614 S. Broadway in the Broadway Theater District in the historic core of downtown Los Angeles. It originally housed the flagship location of Desmond's, for which it is named after.

== History ==
Desmond's Building, built in 1924, was designed by Albert C. Martin Sr., the architect responsible for several Los Angeles landmarks, including Million Dollar Theatre, City Hall, St. Vincent de Paul Church, and May Company Building. This building was originally the flagship location of Desmond's, who vacated it in 1981.

In 1979, the Broadway Theater and Commercial District was added to the National Register of Historic Places, with this building listed as a contributing property in the district. In 2020, the building was listed as Los Angeles Historic Cultural Monument #1207.

Between 2018 and 2020, the building was converted to office space with a restaurant and rooftop bar. The project, which added two floors to the top of the building in addition to a complete restoration, was budgeted at $12 million ($15.4 million in 2025).

In 2024, the building was sold for $16 million.

== Architecture and design ==
Desmond's Building was designed in the Spanish Baroque style and features twisting columns, balconies, and an ornamental pediment. It was built with concrete and has a polychrome terra cotta facade. In 1933, the façade was redone in the Beaux Arts style.

== See also ==
- List of contributing properties in the Broadway Theater and Commercial District
- List of Los Angeles Historic-Cultural Monuments in Downtown Los Angeles
