= The Shops at Santa Anita =

- The current logo of The Shops at Santa Anita 2023-present
- Location: Arcadia, California, U.S.
- Coordinates: 34.13474°N 118.05166°W
- Address: 400 South Baldwin Avenue
- Opened: October 14, 1974; 52 years ago
- Previous names: Santa Anita Fashion Park (1974–1998); Westfield Shoppingtown Santa Anita (1998–2005); Westfield Santa Anita (2005-2022)
- Developer: The Hahn Company
- Owner: Riderwood USA
- Num. of stores: 214
- Num. of anchor tenants: 7
- Floor area: 1,500,000 sq ft (140,000 m^{2})
- Floors: 2 (3 in Macy's and Forever 21)
- Website: www.shopsatsantaanita.com

The Shops at Santa Anita (formerly known as Westfield Santa Anita and as the Santa Anita Fashion Park) is a super-regional shopping mall located in Arcadia, California, adjacent to the Santa Anita Race Track.

== History ==
The mall opened as Santa Anita Fashion Park on October 14, 1974, with original anchors JCPenney, The Broadway, Buffum's and J. W. Robinson's. Only Buffums was open at the mall opening and the other anchors opened gradually through 1976. The western wing was demolished and expanded in the late 1980s, completing in 1994 with a Nordstrom store replacing Buffum's. The J.W. Robinson's store became a Robinsons-May store in 1993, and The Broadway was converted into Macy's in 1996.

In 1998, Westfield America, Inc., a precursor to Westfield Group, acquired the shopping center from TrizecHahn Corporation and renamed it Westfield Shoppingtown Santa Anita. "Shoppingtown" was dropped from the name in June 2005 and the mall became Westfield Santa Anita.

On October 1, 2004, the first phase of a planned three-phase expansion of Westfield Santa Anita opened. The $113 million phase added a new food court, a 16-screen AMC Cinema, Dave & Buster's, a Cheesecake Factory, and 30 new retailers.

On November 24, 2004, a new carousel in the center court was built and opened to the public.

After the 2005 Federated Stores acquisition of The May Department Stores Company, the Robinsons-May store closed in 2006 and remained largely vacant for six years.

On May 7, 2009, the $120 million second phase of the mall's expansion opened. Dubbed "The Promenade", the outdoor expansion added 30 new stores between Macy's and Nordstrom with an emphasis on upscale brands like Coach, Williams Sonoma, Talbots, and Clarks.

On November 3, 2012, Forever 21 relocated from its location on the first floor into most of the former Robinsons-May becoming an anchor tenant. The Robinsons-May store was heavily renovated and repartitioned into smaller parts to accommodate this transition.

The former Robinsons-May store was used for filming the abandoned Bloomingdale's scenes in the 2008 blockbuster Cloverfield.

In September 2013, Westfield Santa Anita hosted the first Haidilao restaurant in the US.

In 2014, major renovations were made featuring new flooring, distinctive fixtures and the upgrade of many seating lounges including a dramatic change to the center court. The renovations of the center court resulted in the removal of the carousel after almost 10 years of operation.

In May 2021, Canadian artist the Weeknd performed "Save Your Tears", a song from his fourth studio album After Hours in the parking lot of Westfield Santa Anita for his 2021 Billboard Music Awards performance.

In August 2021, the shopping center was featured in Olivia Rodrigo's "Brutal" music video.

In August 2022, the shopping center was sold for $538 million to real estate investor Wen Shan Chang and was rebranded as The Shops at Santa Anita.

On September 30, 2023, 99 Ranch Market opened an anchor store in the former first floor of Forever 21.

In February 2025, it was announced that Forever 21 would close its store as part of a plan to close all stores nationwide. The store closed on April 29, 2025.

== See also ==
- Westfield Group
