= Famous Department Store =

Department store in Los Angeles, California

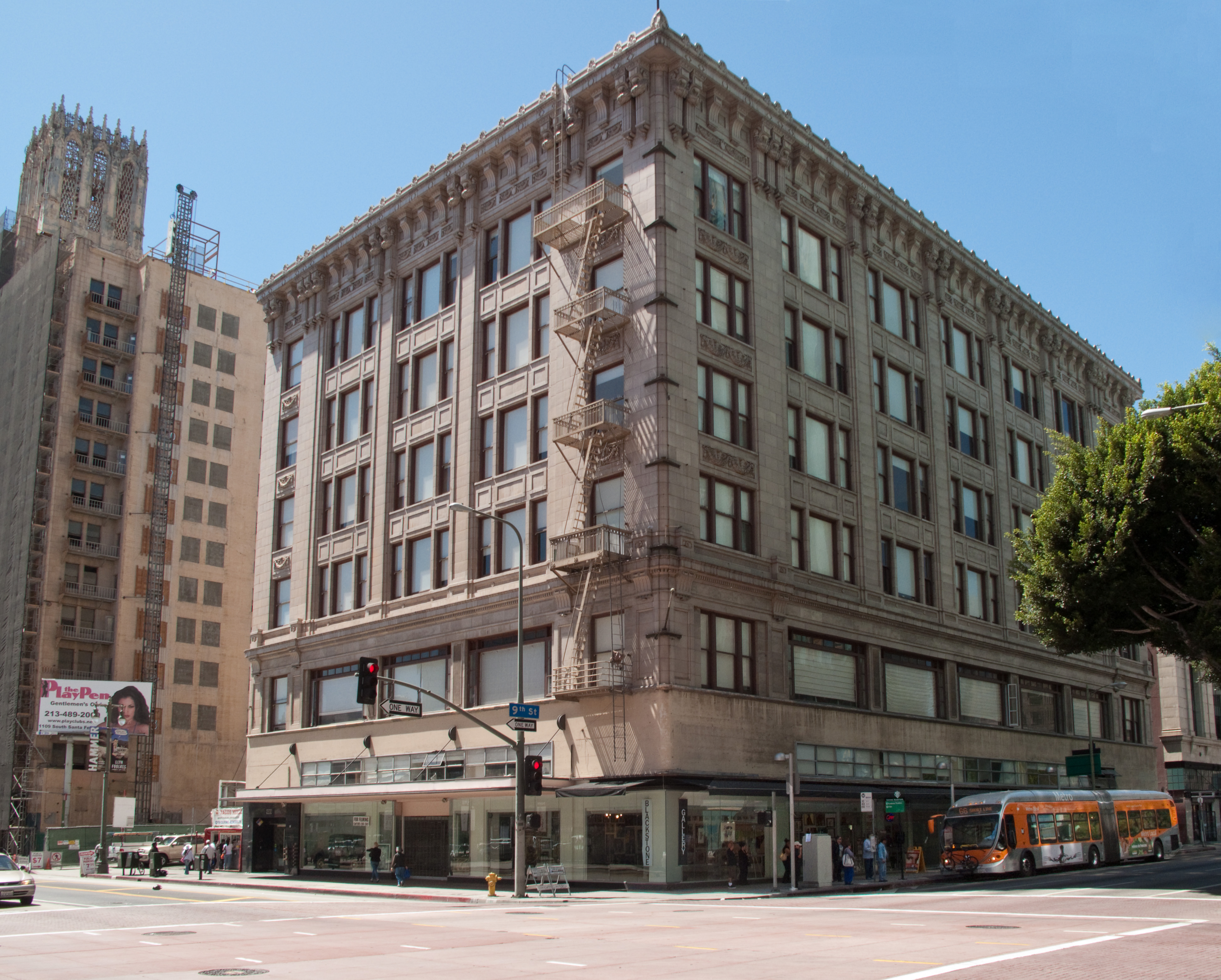
- Blackstone's Department Store, the main branch of Famous Department Store
- Predecessor: Cal Hirsch & Sons Mercantile Co.
- Defunct: 1950
- Fate: Stores sold to J. J. Sugarman Co., brand subsequently retired
- Headquarters: Los Angeles, California, United States
- Number of locations: 8 (1950)

The Famous Department Store was a department store in Los Angeles, California.

== History ==
Famous had its origins with the Cal Hirsch & Sons Mercantile Co., founded in 1860 or 1871. The business ran Army and Navy surplus stores in St. Louis.

The company opened stores in Los Angeles in 1913 and later moved its headquarters there. It operated the "Army and Navy Store" at 526 South Main Street then in December 1916 moved to a larger space next door, advertised as the "world's largest Army and navy store", at 530-532 South Main Street starting. In 1917, the company advertised another branch store in San Diego.

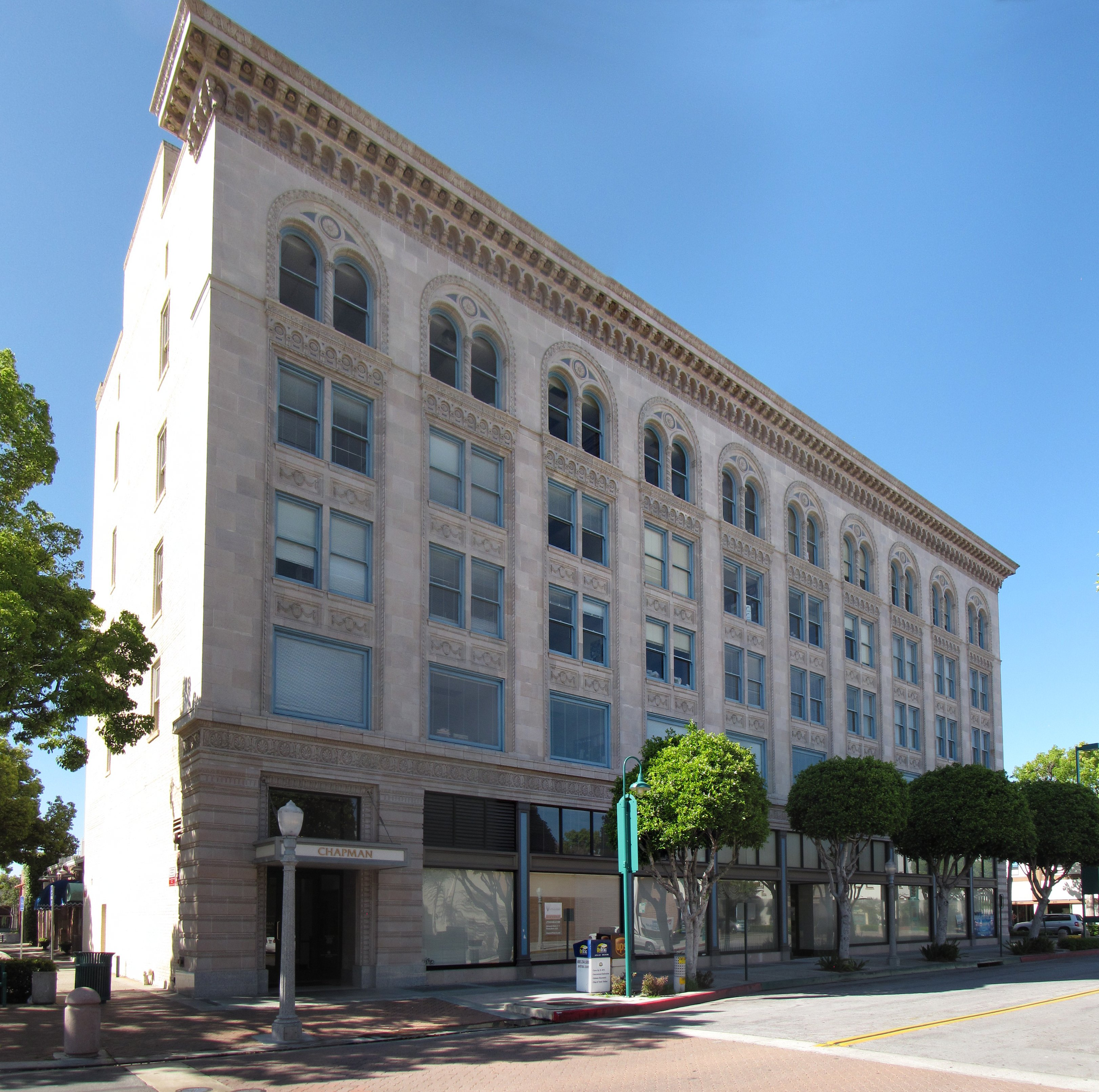
Chapman Building at 110 E. Wilshire at Spadra (Now Harbor), where Famous' Fullerton store opened in 1937

In 1929, the company opened a location in downtown Long Beach. Morgan, Walls & Clements designed the building, which is now a is a city landmark.

U.S. Hirsch was president of the company during the 1930s. By 1948, Urban Hirsch, Jr. was president.

In 1939, the company took over the vacated Blackstone's Department Store Building at 901 South Broadway and renovated and expanded it to 90,000 square feet (8,400 m^{2}), after which the Main Street store was used mostly as a warehouse. The Broadway store sold men's, women's, and children's clothing, shoes, accessories, furniture, furnishings, and an entire floor was devoted to toys. It also had a beauty shop and lunch counter.

In 1950, the company was sold to the Los Angeles business investment firm J. J. Sugarman Co. for an estimated at $3.5 million ($46.8 million in 2025), which was reported by the Los Angeles Times as "one of the larges mercantile sales of its kind in recent years in California." The company consisted of eight stores at that time.

Advertising for the Famous Department Store ceased in 1952.

== Timeline of geographic expansion ==
Opened	City/area	Notes
1913	Downtown Los Angeles, 530 S. Main St.	Main store till 1939, then became the Famous Army and Navy store
1917	San Diego	Branch of the Army and Navy Store
1929	Downtown Long Beach, Pine at 6th	2 stories + basement, 30,000 sq ft (2,800 m^{2}), completed 1929 at a cost of $350,000, Morgan, Walls and Clements architects, art deco style, Long Beach historic landmark building
1926	Glendale, Brand at Harvard	
1932	Santa Ana, 4th and Bush	4th store at the time, 15,000 sq ft (1,400 m^{2}) main floor. Opened December 10, 1932 with ca. 100 employees. National oratory champion Lucille Goldsmith, as well as two other Famous employees from Los Angeles – Yvonne Gregg and Helen Gruda – attended the grand opening. Store manager George J. Kidd. In 1937 it expanded into the basement, selling sporting goods, bicycles, guns, fishing tackle, tires, camping equipment, beach furniture and paint there. On November 8, 1940 opened a second retail floor selling furniture, home decoration, appliances and floor coverings. Modernized and expanded into what it claimed to be the largest store in Santa Ana, adding a third retail floor, a terrazzo floor to the 4th Street entrance, and a self-service elevator. Its grand re-opening was held April 4, 1941.
1933	Pasadena, 268 E. Colorado Boulevard	Opened September 7, 1933, staff of ca. 250
1935	Fresno, Fulton at Tulare in ex-Radin & Kamp building	5 stories, 6th store at the time, opened November 2, 1935 at a cost of $750,000, more than 100,000 sq ft (9,300 m^{2}) of selling space, staff of more than 200, store manager A. O. Lamb
1937	Fullerton, Spadra at Wilshire	
1939	Downtown Los Angeles, 901 S. Broadway	New flagship store
1948	Porterville, Tulare Co.	Opened May 1948. East side of Main St. between Putnam and Mill. Store manager George Noonan.
1948	San Bernardino, 393 E St.	Opened December 17, 1948, store manager Peter Moses
