= Puente Hills Mall =

Shopping mall in City of Industry, California

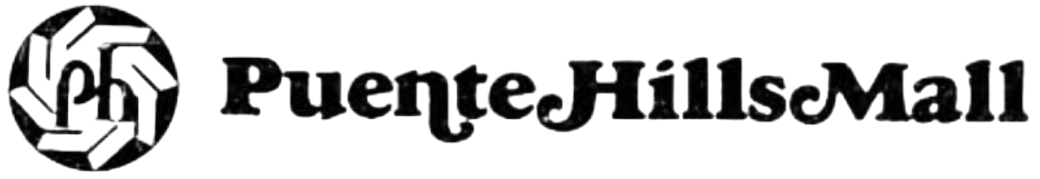

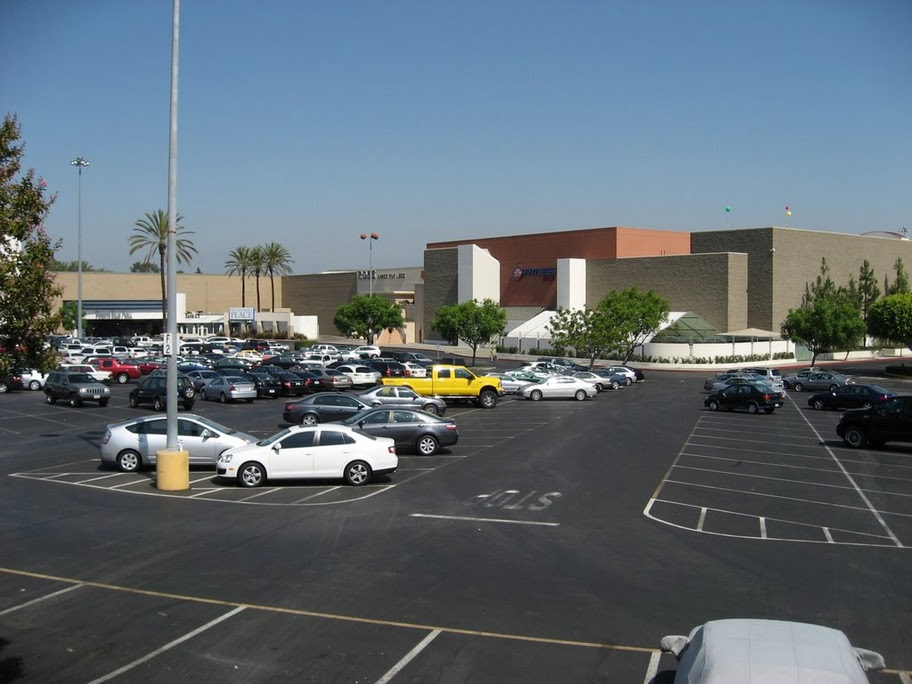
- South Exterior
- Location: City of Industry, California
- Coordinates: 33.99356°N 117.92750°W
- Opened: February 1974
- Developer: The Hahn Company
- Owner: Kam Sang Company
- Num. of stores: 155 at peak; Less than 15 as of 2026
- Num. of anchor tenants: 8 (2 open, 6 vacant)
- Floor area: 1,100,000 sq ft (100,000 m^{2})
- Floors: 2

Puente Hills Mall is a major regional shopping mall located in City of Industry, California in the San Gabriel Valley region of Los Angeles County. It is most famous for serving as the filming site for the Twin Pines/Lone Pine Mall for the 1985 movie Back to the Future starring Michael J. Fox and Christopher Lloyd. Former anchor stores were Burlington, Sears, 24 Hour Fitness, Forever 21, Macy's, and Ross Dress For Less. As of March 2026, AMC Theaters and Round One Corporation are the final two remaining anchors in the mall.

== History ==
=== 1974-75 opening ===
Puente Hills Mall was opened in phases over a year from February 1974 through Spring 1975, after the completion of the Pomona Freeway a few years earlier.

The first anchor to open, on February 18, 1974, was The Broadway, with three levels and 160,000 square feet. J.W. Robinson's followed, opening in March. Sears followed, and by March 1975 the mall had about 150 shops open. JCPenney opened on April 16, 1975. By September 1975, the mall reported 152 shops open and announced plans for the construction of an adjacent 41-acre auto mall and home improvement/home furnishings retail district.

The mall has a cross-shaped design and was developed by The Hahn Company.

=== 1990s ===
In 1993, J.W. Robinson's rebranded as Robinsons-May, after the chain merged with May Company. In 1996, two anchor stores, The Broadway (at the time purchased by Macy's) and JCPenney, were closed. The AMC Puente Hills 20 opened on April 18, 1997 in the shell of the former Broadway department store. At the time of JCPenney's departure, the mall was at about 50% occupancy. The mall was extensively renovated afterwards and features a 20-screen AMC Theatres megaplex, and stores traditionally found in power centers such as 24 Hour Fitness and Burlington Coat Factory, in addition to the remaining two original anchors, Robinsons-May and Sears. Ross Dress for Less, Circuit City, Linens 'n Things, Spectrum Club, Burlington Coat Factory, Borders, and CompUSA all opened in 1998.

=== 2000s ===
In September 2006, Borders closed while Robinsons-May rebranded as Macy's, after Federated purchased The May Department Stores Company in 2005. Linens 'n Things, Circuit City, and CompUSA all closed their locations at the mall in 2008 and 2009. Circuit City and CompUSA had both gone bankrupt while Linens 'n Things was closed as part of a strategy to focus on online shopping. On August 28, 2010, the Japanese sports entertainment chain Round1 opened the first U.S. location of Round1 Bowling & Amusement, a video game arcade and bowling alley, as a new anchor. It was the company's first overseas store, replacing Linens 'n Things.

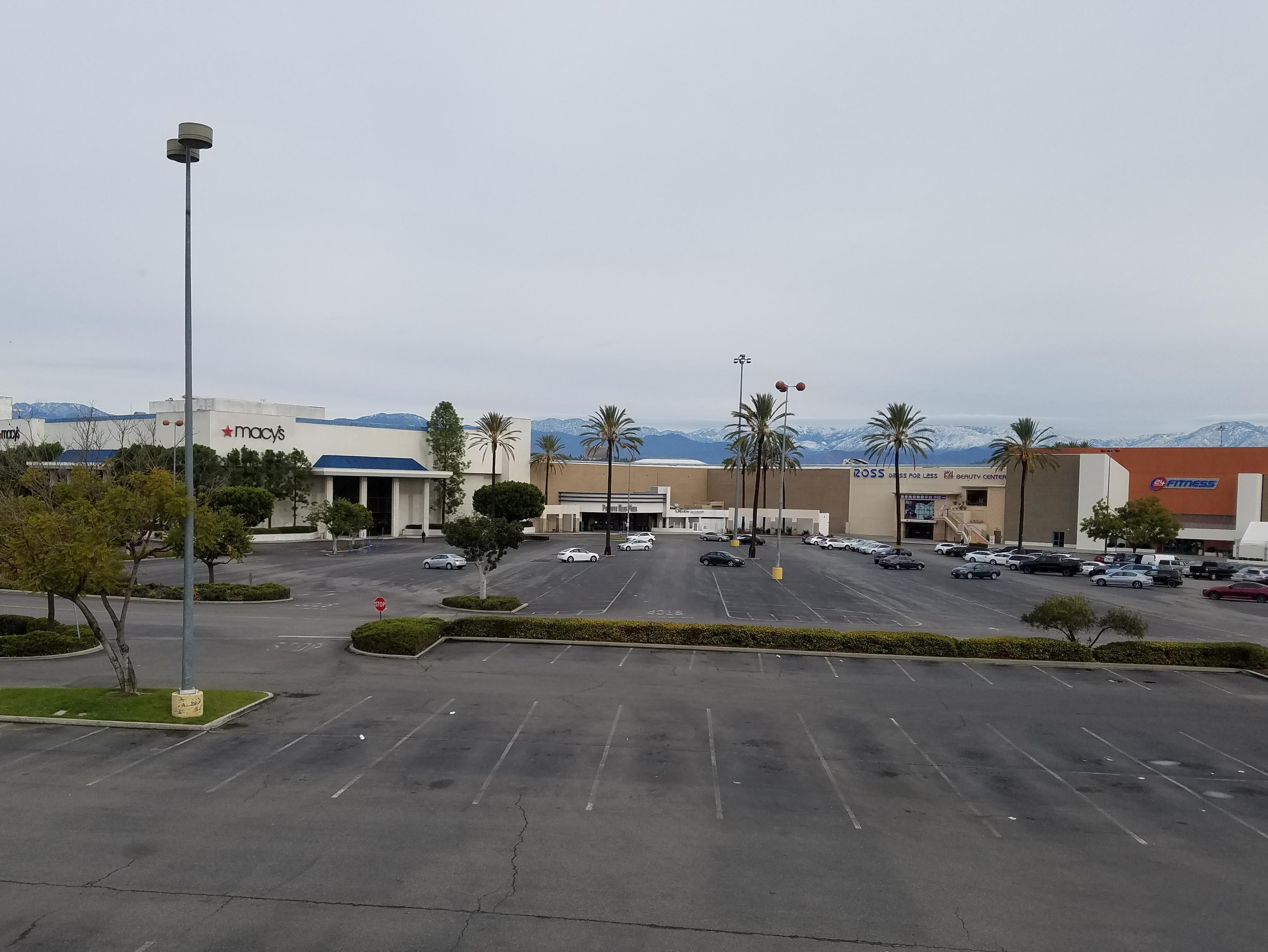
The southern side of Puente Hills Mall as seen from Colima Road in 2019

The center of the mall previously featured a large cubed water fountain, then a merry-go-round attraction built in 1990, but it was later removed by the mall's owners, Krausz Companies, as they were losing money in its operation. An East Asian-style koi pond replaced the carousel, but was removed as of 2006. The koi were moved to Sycamore Lake at Rose Hills Memorial Park in Whittier. The mall underwent a full interior makeover in 2007 after the removal of the koi pond.

Due to the large and influential Asian immigrant populations residing and/or operating businesses in nearby areas (notably in Industry, Hacienda Heights, Rowland Heights, Walnut, and Diamond Bar), some redesigns of the mall incorporated feng shui principles.

=== Store closures since 2018 ===
Toys "R" Us opened in June 2011, taking the spot previously occupied by Circuit City. Toys "R" Us had formerly been located at the Plaza at Puente Hills on Gale Avenue in Industry. It closed along with all Toys 'R' Us stores in early 2018, shutting down on April 15, 2018.

On May 31, 2018, it was announced that Sears would be closing as part of a plan to close 72 stores nationwide. The store closed in September 2018.

On December 1, 2019, Forever 21 announced it would close the Puente Hills Mall store along with 21 other locations in California & 90 stores nationwide. The store closed in January 2020.

On January 5, 2022, Macy's announced that their Puente Hills Mall anchor would be closed in the first financial quarter of 2022. The store closed on March, with Burlington slated to close on March 22, 2024. Later, 24 Hour Fitness closed in June 2025, and more recently Ross closed on January 16, 2026, leaving Round 1, and AMC as the final two remaining anchors in the mall as of 2026.

=== Military exercises ===
On June 5, 2026, The United States Army carried out a military drill at the mall as well as other parts of Los Angeles County. Locals reported that it was loud and rattling doors and windows.

== Back to the Future ==
Puente Hills Mall served as a filming location for the fictional Twin Pines Mall (later Lone Pine Mall) in the 1985 film Back to the Future. In the film, Doc Brown (Christopher Lloyd) uses the mall's south parking lot (visible in the above photograph) to stage his time travel experiments with the DeLorean time machine. The JCPenney and Robinson's stores feature prominently in the background. J.C Penney closed this location in October 1996. A Ross Dress for Less store can be seen in a strip mall across the street. The scenes were filmed in January 1985. According to the DVD audio commentary, screenplay writer Bob Gale says that, three months after the theatrical release, several fans gathered at the Puente Hills Mall in the early hours of October 26, 1985, the date given in the film as the present day, to see if anything would happen.

Puente Hills Mall featured replicas of the Twin Pines Mall sign, the time machine, and Dr. E. Brown Enterprises truck in its parking lot in October 2015.
