= Daniel Desmond =

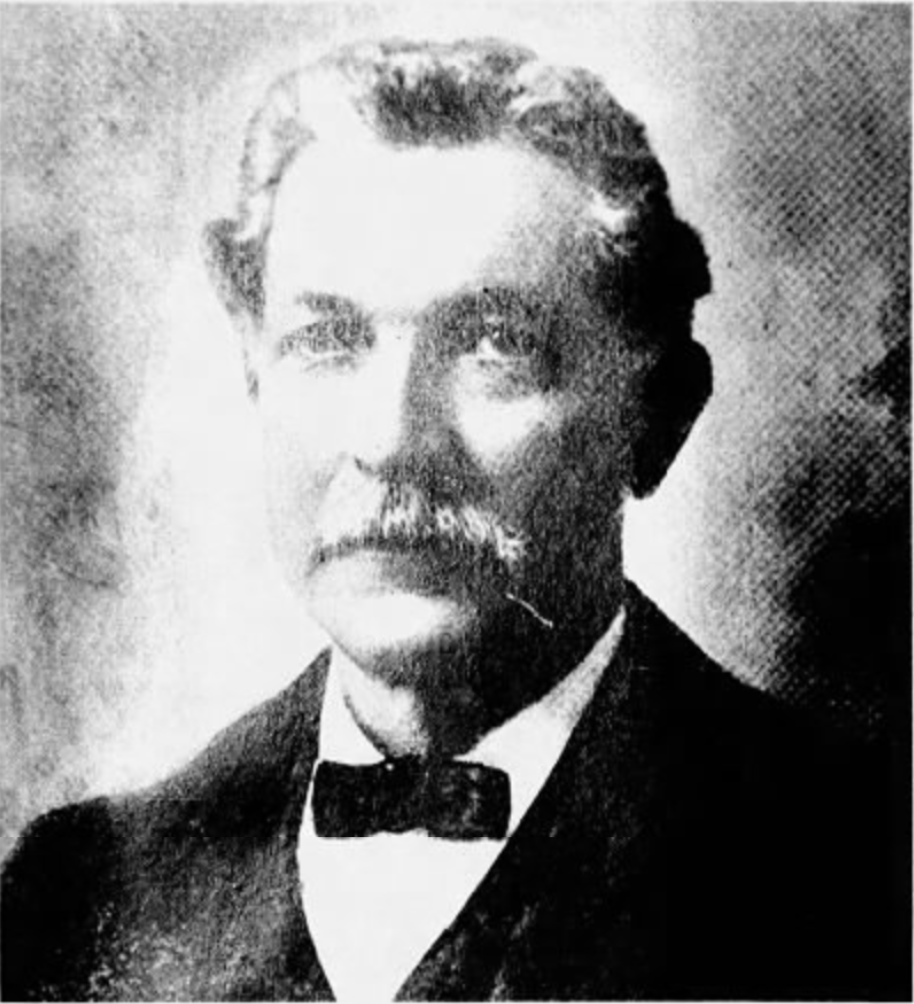
Daniel Desmond

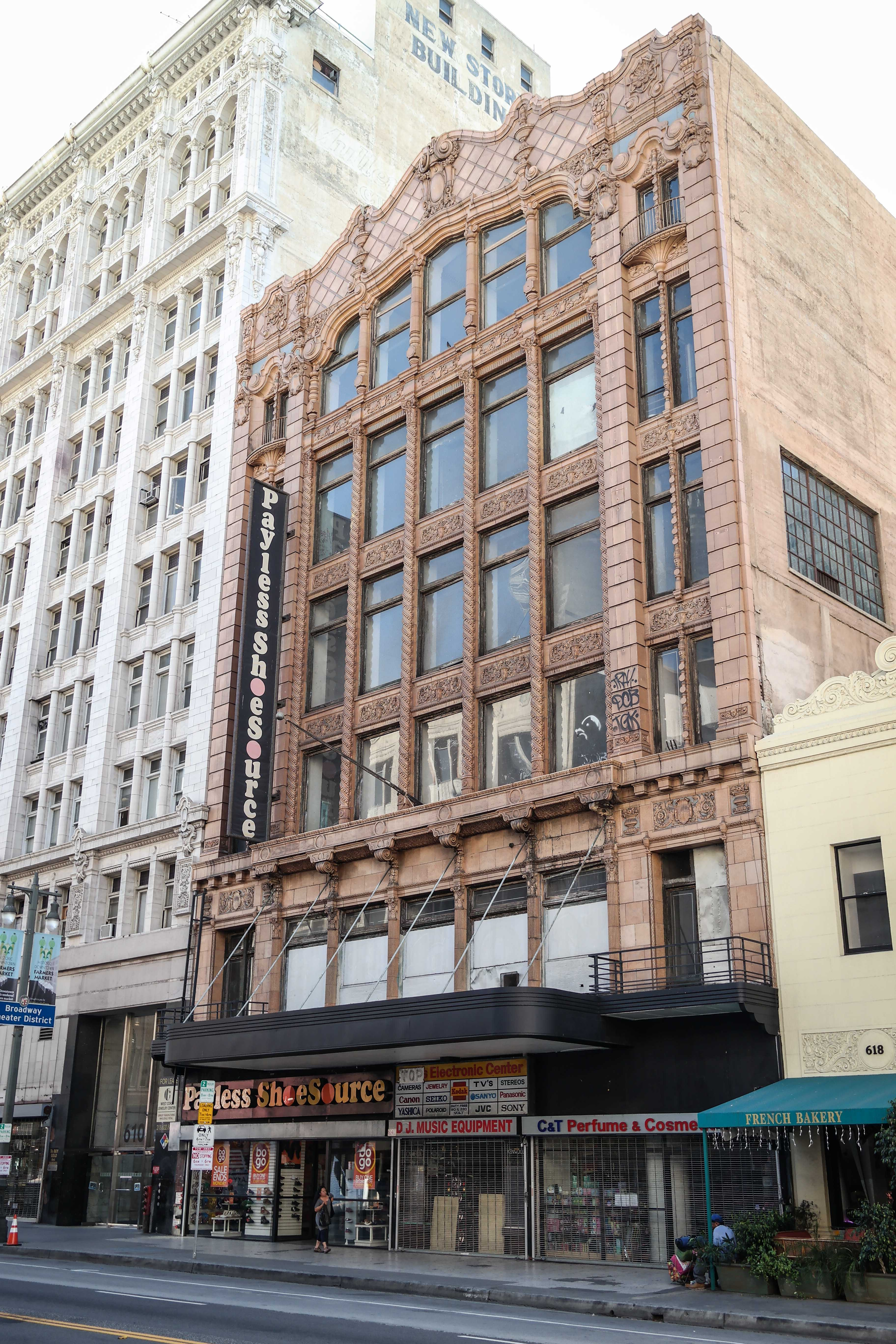
Former Desmond's flagship store at 616 S. Broadway, Los Angeles

Daniel Desmond (b. Oct. 9, 1833, Cork, Ireland – d. January 23, 1903, Los Angeles) was an Irish-American retail store owner, the founder of Desmond's, a Los Angeles–based department store, during most of its existence the oldest major retailer in the city, which Mr. Desmond founded as a hat shop in 1862.

Desmond emigrated from Ireland to the U.S. at age 18, settling at Lawrence, Massachusetts. He began hatmaking.

In the second year of the American Civil War and only the 16th year that the United States ruled California, 1862, Daniel Desmond arrived in the state via clipper ship via Cape Horn, Chile, as there was no transcontinental railroad yet. His brother Cornelius was a hatter in San Francisco from at least c.1864 through 1879, for a time working with their other brother Jeremiah. The shop was variously located at Bush and Sansome (1860s), under the Cosmopolitan Hotel (1869) and under the Grand Hotel (1870s) and/or at new Montgomery at Market streets.

In the 1860s, Los Angeles had a population of less than 4,500, and at some point in that decade, Desmond opened a hat shop on the Los Angeles Plaza. It measured only a few square feet and he was the only employee. Desmond was also a member of the volunteer fire department. The store changed location several times during Daniel Desmond's lifetime. In 1927, the chain, after 65 years in business, started opening branch stores, and would grow to become a major Southern California department store chain, with 19 stores across Greater Los Angeles at its peak, until it finally went out of business in 1981.

Desmond retired due to failing health a few years before his death in 1903, survived by a widow and eight children. His son Cornelius C. Desmond would take over management of the Desmond's store, and another son, J. D. Desmond, also became well-known Los Angeles retailers.
