= The Shops at Palm Desert =

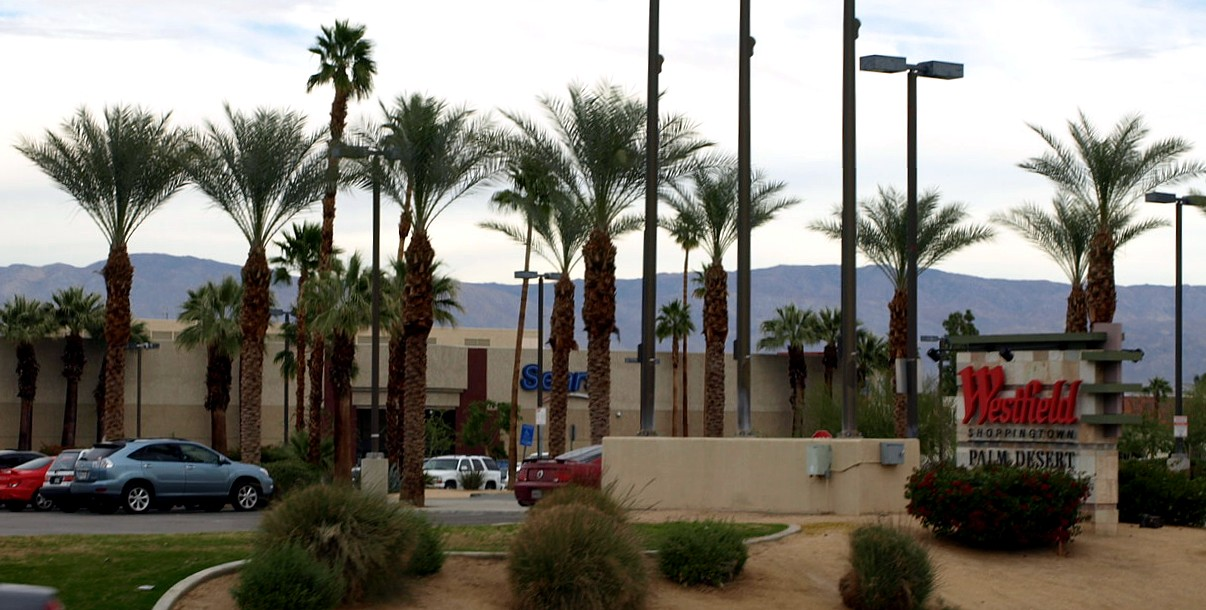
- View of the mall as seen from CA SR 111, as seen in 2010
- Location: Palm Desert, California
- Coordinates: 33.7235°N 116.3950°W
- Address: 72-840 California 111
- Opened: October 1982; 44 years ago
- Previous names: Palm Desert Town Center (1982–1999); Westfield Shoppingtown Palm Desert (1999–2005); Westfield Palm Desert (2005–2021)
- Developer: TrizecHahn Corporation
- Manager: Pacific Retail Capital Partners
- Owner: Pacific Retail Capital Partners
- Architect: Millard Archuleta/Robert H. Riciardi & Associates
- Num. of stores: 122
- Num. of anchor tenants: 5 (4 open, 1 vacant)
- Floor area: 980,041 sq ft (91,048.8 m^{2})
- Floors: 2 (3 in former Sears)
- Website: www.shopsatpalmdesert.com

The Shops at Palm Desert (previously Palm Desert Town Center, Westfield Shoppingtown Palm Desert, Westfield Palm Desert) is a shopping mall located in Palm Desert, California which serves the Coachella Valley. The mall features the traditional retailers Macy's, JCPenney, Dick's Sporting Goods, and Barnes & Noble, with 122 inline stores. In addition, the mall includes a food court; the Tristone Palm Desert 10 Cinemas closed in February 2023, and discussions have been held with various theater chains to operate the space.

== History ==
The shopping center was developed by Ernest W. Hahn in 1982 and opened as Palm Desert Town Center. The $75 million project spanned 62 acres (25 ha) and included four major department stores, 130 inline shops, an eight-screen theater, a food court and an indoor ice skating rink. Other stores included "What's Up" and The Balboa Beach Company. A small arcade called The Yellow Brick Road was on the second level above the skating rink, next to the food court. Original anchor stores were May Company, Bonwit Teller, JCPenney, and Bullock's.

In 1987, Bonwit Teller decided to close all of its California stores and its spot at the mall was taken by Bullocks Wilshire. This was the first time that a Bullocks Wilshire store was located in the same mall with a Bullock's store. A fifth anchor, J.W. Robinson's, opened a few months later in 1987. After developing and managing the property for a number of years, Hahn was able to purchase the property from its owner, Palm Desert Town Center Associates, in 1989.

In February 1993, both J.W. Robinson's and May Company stores rebranded as Robinsons-May. In April 1996, Bullock's rebranded as Macy's. In August 1999, Westfield America, Inc., announced it had acquired Palm Desert Town Center from TrizecHahn Corporation, the successor to Hahn, for $82 million. Following the acquisition, the name became Westfield Shoppingtown Palm Desert. However, in 2005 the company migrated away from this branding strategy and dropped 'Shoppingtown' from most of its U.S. properties. The mall became Westfield Palm Desert.

Over the years the mall has gone through many changes resulting from various mergers and acquisitions in the retail industry. This resulted in the consolidation of regional department stores and ultimately led to vacant anchor spaces at the mall, like the consolidation of the two Robinsons-May stores in 2002, leaving the other one (former J.W. Robinson's) to Sears, which opened in November 2004. Barnes & Noble moved into the mall in 2003. In 2006, Macy's moved to the newly expanded Robinsons-May store, closing the original Bullock's/Macy's store.

In 2013, a renovation plan began which involved converting a two-level vacant anchor space on the north side to Dick's Sporting Goods (upper level) and World Gym on the first level of the space. In addition, a partially vacant two-level anchor on the south side was converted into a Grand Entrance with frontage on California State Route 111, a busy thoroughfare running through the city. The demolition involved the preservation of the subterranean level of the space previously occupied by Bullock's. Macy's incorporated this space into its existing furniture store which is situated below Barnes & Noble. The "Grand Entrance" includes new sit-down restaurants and retail space and is accented with decorative fountains.

An expansion plan announced in 2006 included the addition of a full line Nordstrom department store on the north and a significant remodel and expansion of the existing movie theater. The plan never came to fruition given the economic downturn.

As of December 2014, Westfield Palm Desert featured 151 specialty stores and was 95.1% leased. The 980,041 square feet (91,049 m^{2}) mall offers 495,538 square feet (46,037 m^{2}) of specialty store space and has significant potential for future expansion.

In 2015, Sears Holdings spun off 235 of its properties, including the Sears at Westfield Palm Desert, into Seritage Growth Properties.

On November 7, 2019, it was announced that Sears would be closing this location a part of a plan to close 96 stores nationwide. The store closed in February 2020.

In 2015, Westfield sold a 47.4 percent interest in the mall to O'Connor Capital Partners while Westfield retained majority interest. Two years later, Westfield was acquired by Unibail-Rodamco to form Unibail-Rodamco-Westfield. In 2021, Unibail-Rodamco-Westfield announced plans to sell the mall and renamed the mall "The Shops at Palm Desert" in preparation of the eventual sale. Unibail-Rodamco-Westfield has also turnover the management of the mall to JLL until the sale is completed.

In late November 2023, the mall was acquired from JLL to Pacific Retail Capital Partners. The price for the acquisition was undisclosed.
