= Blackstone's Department Store Building =

Building in Los Angeles, California

- Blackstone's Department Store
- U.S. Historic district – Contributing property
- Los Angeles Historic-Cultural Monument
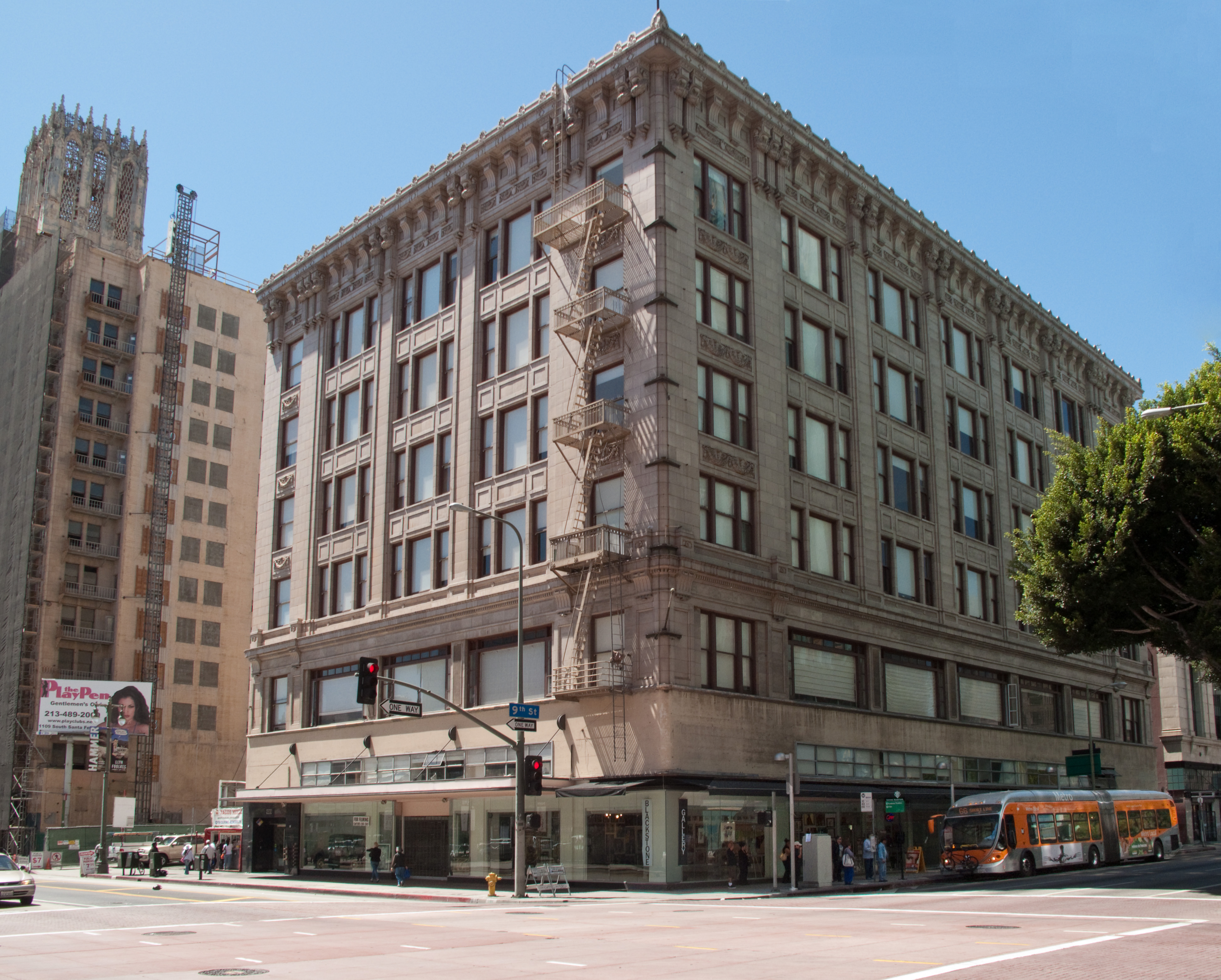
- The building in 2013

- Location within the Los Angeles metropolitan area
- Location: 901 South Broadway, Los Angeles
- Coordinates: 34°02′32″N 118°15′23″W
- Built: 1916
- Architect: John B. Parkinson (1916); Morgan, Walls & Clements (1939 renovation)
- Architectural style: Beaux Arts
- Website: https://www.liveatblackstonedtla.com/
- Part of: Broadway Theater and Commercial District (ID02000330)
- LAHCM No.: 765

Significant dates
- Designated CP: April 12, 2002
- Designated LAHCM: November 7, 2003

Blackstone's Department Store building, also known as Blackstone Apartments and The Blackstone, is a historic six-story building located at 901 South Broadway in the Broadway Theater District in the historic core of downtown Los Angeles.

== History of Blackstone's ==
Nathaniel Blackstone (brother-in-law of department store magnate J. W. Robinson) opened Blackstone's Dry Goods in 1895 when J.W. Robinson Co. (commonly known as the "Boston Store" at that time) vacated its 171–173 Spring Street location. In 1898, the company moved to the Douglas Building (then known as the "New" Stimson Block) at the northwest corner of 3rd and Spring streets, where it occupied the entire basement and 20,000 sq ft (1,900 m^{2}) on the ground floor.

In 1907, N. B. Blackstone Co. moved into the A. P. Johnson Building located at 318–322 S. Broadway. This building, also known as Blackstone Building, was listed as a non-contributing property in the National Register of Historic Places-listed Broadway Theater and Commercial District in 1979.

Blackstone's Department Store moved into its flagship building in 1917, where it would remain until the company was bought by Famous Department Store in 1939.

== Blackstone's Department Store Building ==
In 1916, developer Arthur H. Fleming hired John B. Parkinson to design a modern department store for his new tenant, Blackstone. The location, at the southwest corner of 9th and Broadway, would serve as the company's flagship. The building cost of $500,000 ($14.8 million in 2025) and contained six above and two below-ground levels. It opened on September 20, 1917.

Blackstone's had vacated the building by 1939, at which point Famous Department Store renovated and expanded it to 90,000 square feet (8,400 m^{2}). Famous Department Store featured a department store, lunch counter, and beauty shop in the building.

Blackstone's Department Store was not included in the Broadway Theater and Commercial District when the district was first added to the National Register of Historic Places in 1979, but the building was part of a 2002 expansion of the district. Additionally, the building was listed as Los Angeles Historic-Cultural Monument No. 765 in 2003.

In 2010, Blackstone's Department Store was converted to 82 apartments with ground-floor retail space and a subterranean parking garage.

== Architecture and design ==
Designed by John B. Parkinson, the Blackstone's Department Store is rectangular in plan with 90 feet (27 m) of frontage on Broadway and 165 feet (50 m) on 9th Street, and is built of brick and stone inside a steel frame. The building, clad in terra cotta, features a Beaux Arts design, with aspects of the design that include:

- five bays on its east and seven bays on its north exterior
- broad windows outlined by multi-paned sidelights and transoms in the second-story central bays
- single one-overone sash in the end bays on the east and triple one-overone sash in the end bays on the north
- denticulated cornice set over paneled piers and a plain frieze wrap the building above the second story, all punctuated by fluted corbels on both sides of the end bays
- three windows in each bay on the third through sixth floors, with the exception of the end bays on the east which contain single windows
- fluted panels below the third story windows that anchor the third through sixth floors
- piers between the central bays that rise to the cornice without interruption
- paneled spandrels mark the central bays while raised swags embellish the end bay spandrels
- additional swagged spandrels above the sixth story bays with paired trebled bracket counterpoints upon which the bracketed cornice rests
- a row of antefixes decorate the upper edges of the cornice.

In 1939, the first-floor façade was stripped of its original detailing and re-designed in the Streamline Moderne style by Stiles O. Clements of Morgan, Walls and Clements. Morgan, Walls, and Clements also oversaw numerous other renovations to the building.

As of 2002, the condition and integrity of the building was considered good.

== In popular culture ==
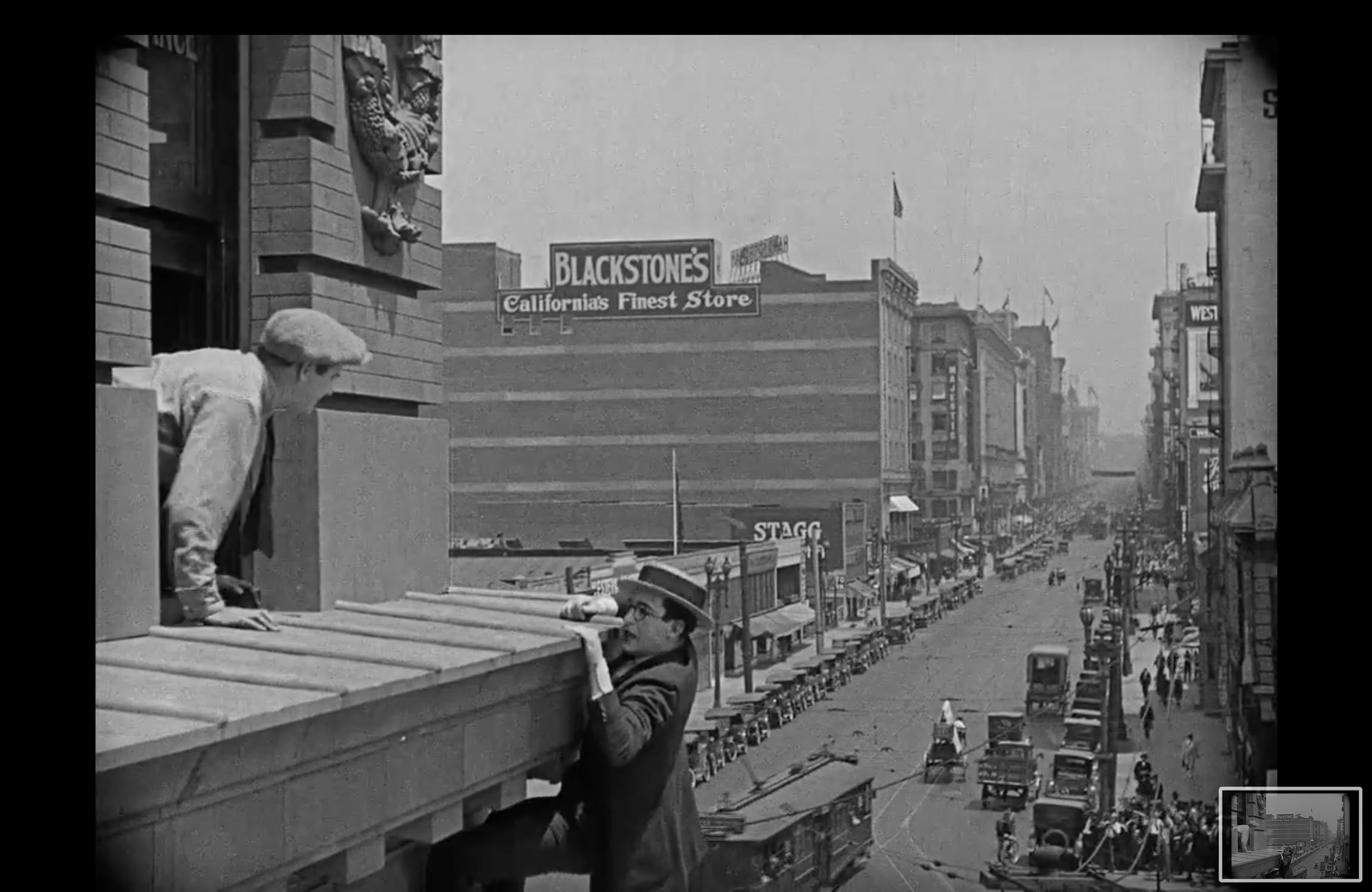
Still from Safety Last! with Blackstone's Department Store building in the background

Blackstone's Department Store was one of the buildings prominently seen behind Harold Lloyd as he climbs another building in the 1923 silent film Safety Last!.

== See also ==
- List of contributing properties in the Broadway Theater and Commercial District
- List of Los Angeles Historic-Cultural Monuments in Downtown Los Angeles
