= Burke, Kober and Nicolais =

Architecture firm based in Los Angeles

Burke, Kober and Nicolais, from 1968 Burke, Kober, Nicolais and Archuleta was a partnership of architects active mostly in Greater Los Angeles in the 1950s and 1960s. Partners were Eugene Burke, Charles McChesney Kober and Harold J. Nicolais.

== Works ==
Source: Pacific Coast Architecture Database or as cited:

- Santa Ana Fashion Square (orig. "Bullock's Fashion Square"), tenants' buildings, Santa Ana, 1958
- Desmond's, Pasadena, 1954
- Bond Clothing, Miracle Mile, Los Angeles, 1956 (interiors)
- Desmond's (interiors), Santa Barbara 1967
- Desmond's Del Amo, Torrance, 1966
- Desmond's, Ventura, 1964
- Harper and Reynolds Building, Los Angeles, 1953
- Rossmoor Business Center, Seal Beach, 1960
- Security-1st National Bank, Branch, Huntington Beach, 1957
- Sherman Oaks Fashion Square, Sherman Oaks, Los Angeles, 1961–1962
- Western Airlines, Office Building, Panorama City, 1957
