= Ruth Shellhorn =

American landscape architect

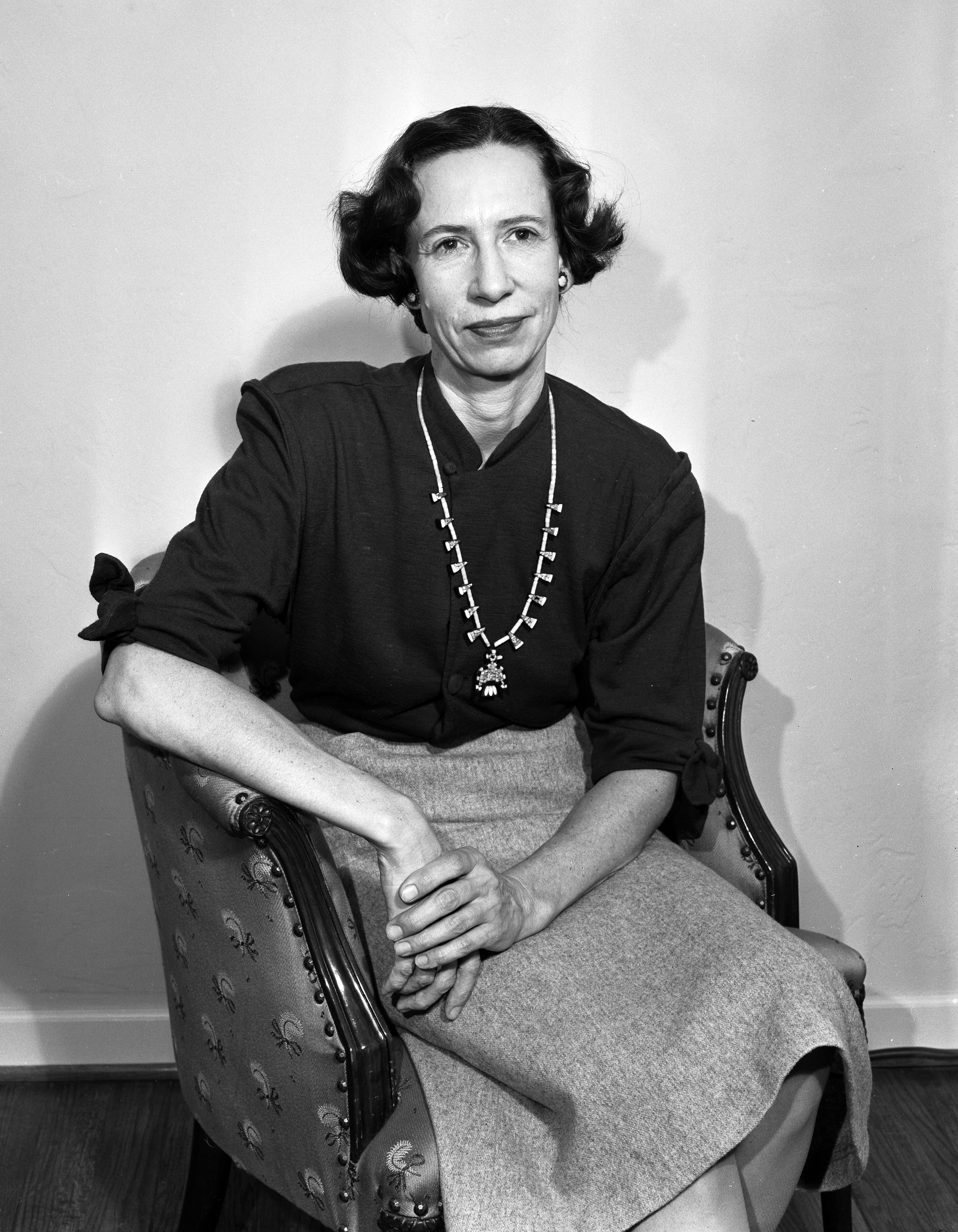
- Shellhorn in 1955
- Born: September 21, 1909
- Died: November 3, 2006 (aged 97); Torrance, California
- Occupation: Landscape architect
- Known for: midcentury modern architecture
- Notable work: Bullock’s department store chain and the central landscaping elements of Disneyland

Ruth Patricia Shellhorn (September 21, 1909 – November 3, 2006) was among the most important Southern California landscape architects of the post-war era. Shellhorn designed more than four hundred projects over the course of six decades. The most influential of these were the landscape designs she created for the new Bullock's department stores and Fashion Square shopping centers.These were modernist landscape designs, evoking a sun-soaked, leisurely lifestyle that came to epitomize the "Southern California look".

With a focus on indoor/outdoor living, she incorporated topography and nature into urban settings to create landscapes in her designs for residences, retail, city and regional parks, universities, and colleges. The Los Angeles Times named her Woman of the Year for 1955.

Her work on the Shoreline Development Study became a precedent for development along the California Coast. She designed Bullock's department store, the Fashion Square shopping centers at Santa Ana, Sherman Oaks, La Habra and Del Amo in Torrance. In 1955, she was hired by Walt Disney to create a comprehensive pedestrian circulation system for Disneyland, establishing central landscaping elements of the park.

== Early life and education ==
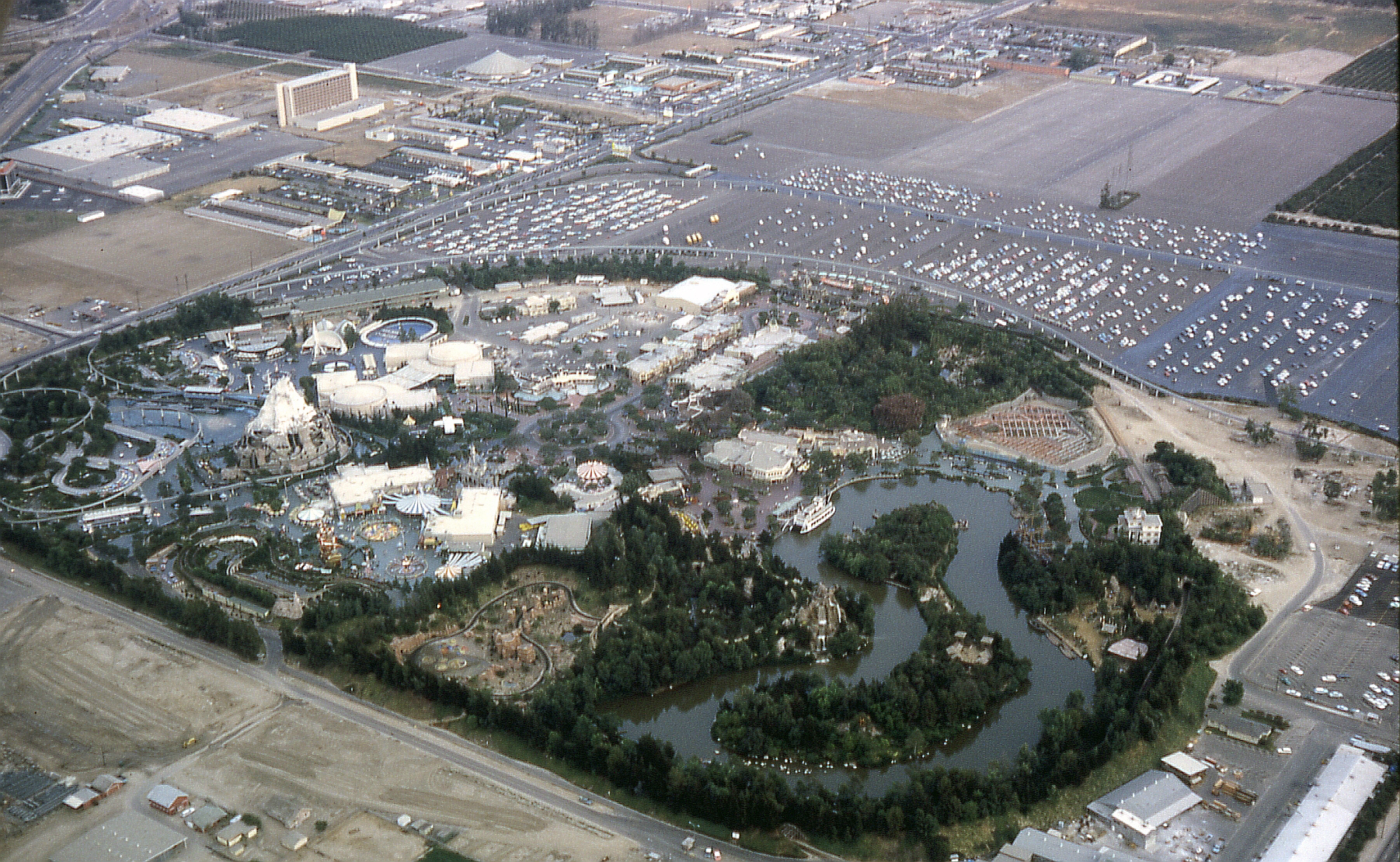
Aerial view of Disneyland, Anaheim, California, 1963.

Shellhorn was born on September 21, 1909, and grew up in Pasadena, California. Her father was a dentist and her mother volunteered at numerous civic and city beautifying organization. Her parents encouraged her to pursue a profession that used both her mathematical skills and her artistic mind. Her neighbor, landscape architect Florence Yoch inspired her and recommended that she study landscape architecture.

After high school, Shellhorn attended the School of Landscape Architecture at Oregon Agricultural State College from 1927 to 1930. While she was there, she was the first woman to win the Alpha Zeta Scholarship Cup. She also won an award in a national Beaux-Arts design competition.

In 1930, she transferred to Cornell University, where she took engineering and architecture classes. She was the only woman in her class of six in the Department of Landscape Architecture. She originally did not receive her degree, she was considered 4 units short. In 2005, Shellhorn's records were reviewed by Cornell and, she was awarded degrees in Architecture and Landscape Architecture.

When she returned to Southern California in 1933, she was one of the rare designers to be professionally trained, which distinguished her from most male practitioners.

== Works ==
Name	City	US State/ Country	Completed	Other Information	Image
Bullock's	Pasadena	California	1947	Landscape Architect	
Disneyland	Anaheim	California	1955	Designed pedestrian circulation	
University of California Riverside	Riverside	California	1956	Designed expansion of campus	
Western Home Office, Prudential Insurance Company	Los Angeles	California	1948	Landscape Architect	

Shellhorn was also a major advocate for Land Studies. She spent two years working with the Shoreline Development Study for the Greater Los Angeles Citizen's Committee. She focused on bringing restrictions on oil drilling in Santa Monica Bay, a precedent for the goals of the later-enacted California Coastal Act, an advocate for the use of public funding for recreation and parkland acquisition. The study also set precedent for Los Angeles's first sewage treatment plant.

== Bibliography ==
- Comras, Kelly. Ruth Shellhorn. 2016. Amherst, MA: Library of American Landscape History, and Athens, GA: The University of Georgia Press.
