= La Habra Marketplace =

- Location: La Habra, California, United States
- Coordinates: 33.9182°N 117.9640°W
- Opened: August 10, 1968
- Closed: 1992 (Fashion Square)
- Previous names: La Habra Fashion Square
- Developer: Bullock's
- Owner: DJM Capital
- Num. of stores: 50+ (Fashion Square)
- Num. of anchor tenants: 3 (Fashion Square); 5 (Marketplace)
- Floor area: 567,864 square feet (52,756.3 m^{2}) (Fashion Square); 375,013 square feet (34,839.8 m^{2}) (Marketplace)
- Floors: 1

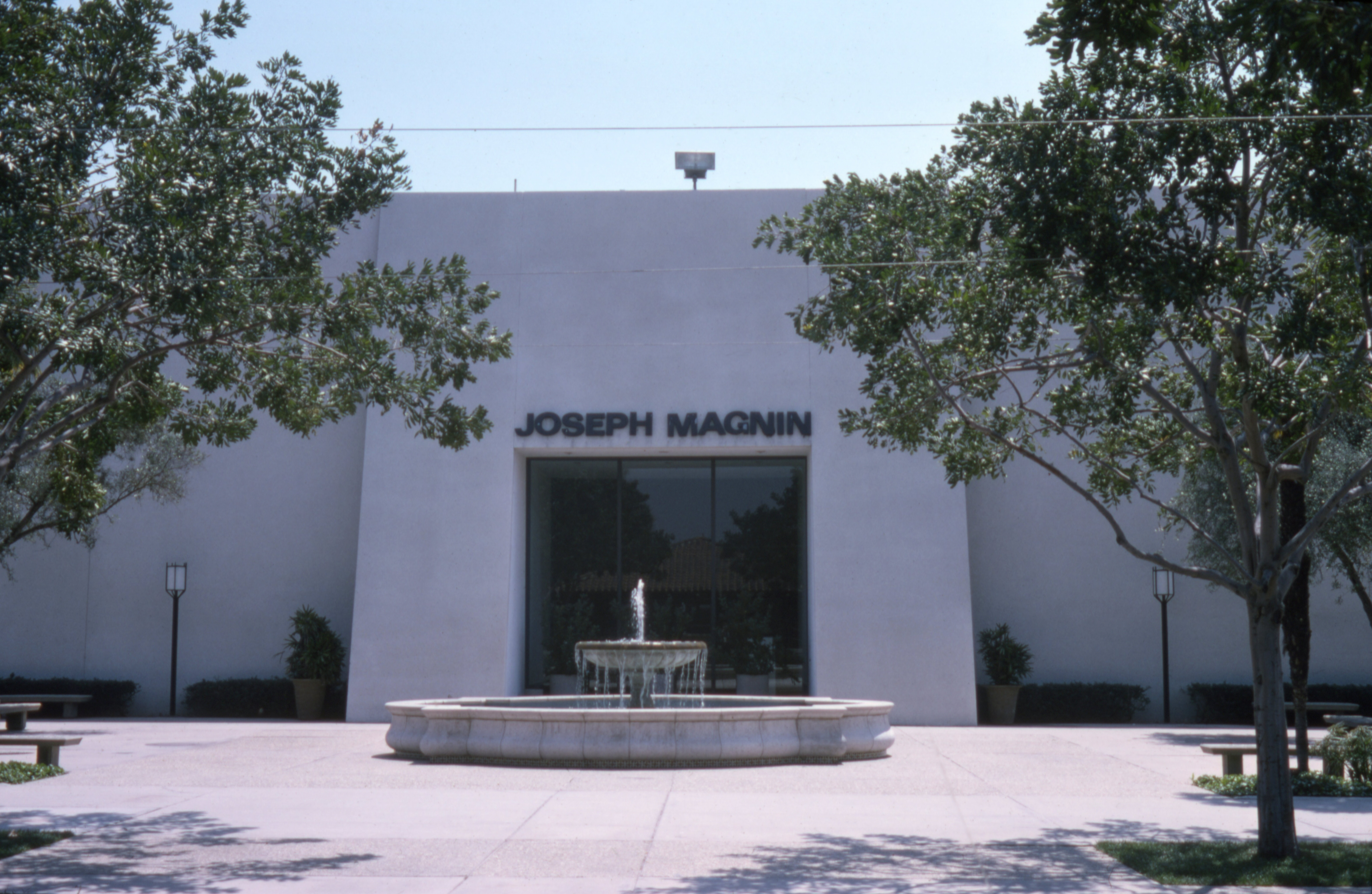
Historic photo of the Joseph Magnin department store, La Habra Fashion Square

La Habra Marketplace, formerly La Habra Fashion Square, is an open-air regional mall in La Habra, California, built by the Bullock's department store chain. Welton Becket and Associates were the architects. It was the last and largest of the "Fashion Square" malls that it built, after Santa Ana, Sherman Oaks and Del Amo. The site measured 40 acres (160,000 m^{2}), with 565,618 square feet (52,547.6 m^{2}) of retail space, of which the large Bullock's store represented about half. The center has been re-developed into a strip mall called La Habra Marketplace.

== Original tenants ==
Department stores (major and junior) at launch were:

- Bullock's - as of 1987 measuring 271,000 square feet (25,200 m^{2})
- Buffum's - as of 1987 measuring 120,000 square feet (11,000 m^{2})
- Joseph Magnin - 19,500 square feet (1,810 m^{2}))
- Silverwoods

Other stores at opening included Hickory Farms, B. Dalton Bookseller, Damon's, Draper's, Leed's, See's Candy, Slavick's Jewelers, United California Bank and Crocker-Citizens Bank. Restaurants included Fiddler's Three, Don Paul and Lyons.

== Reception ==
Partially due to the proximity of other malls, and also that the envisioned Imperial Highway (SR-90) and Beach Boulevard (SR-39) freeways were not built in time and thus never brought the expected traffic, the mall turned out to be disappointing and generally had disappointing sales performance.

By 1987, at $27.8 million, annual sales were second to last of Orange County's 14 regional malls, and its sales per square foot were last of 48 regional malls in Southern California regional malls, at $50.78 versus, for example, $190.09 at South Coast Plaza.

The Bullock's store was closed in 1992, razed in the late 1990s and strip mall buildings were constructed in the mall's place.

== Current shopping center ==
The community shopping center now on the site is named La Habra Marketplace and has 375,013 square feet (34,839.8 m^{2}) of gross leasable area. Current tenants include Smart & Final (formerly Drug Emporium), Ross Dress for Less, LA Fitness, Sprouts Farmers Market (formerly OfficeMax) and Regal Cinemas.
