= K Line Extension to Torrance =

Light rail extension project in Los Angeles County, California

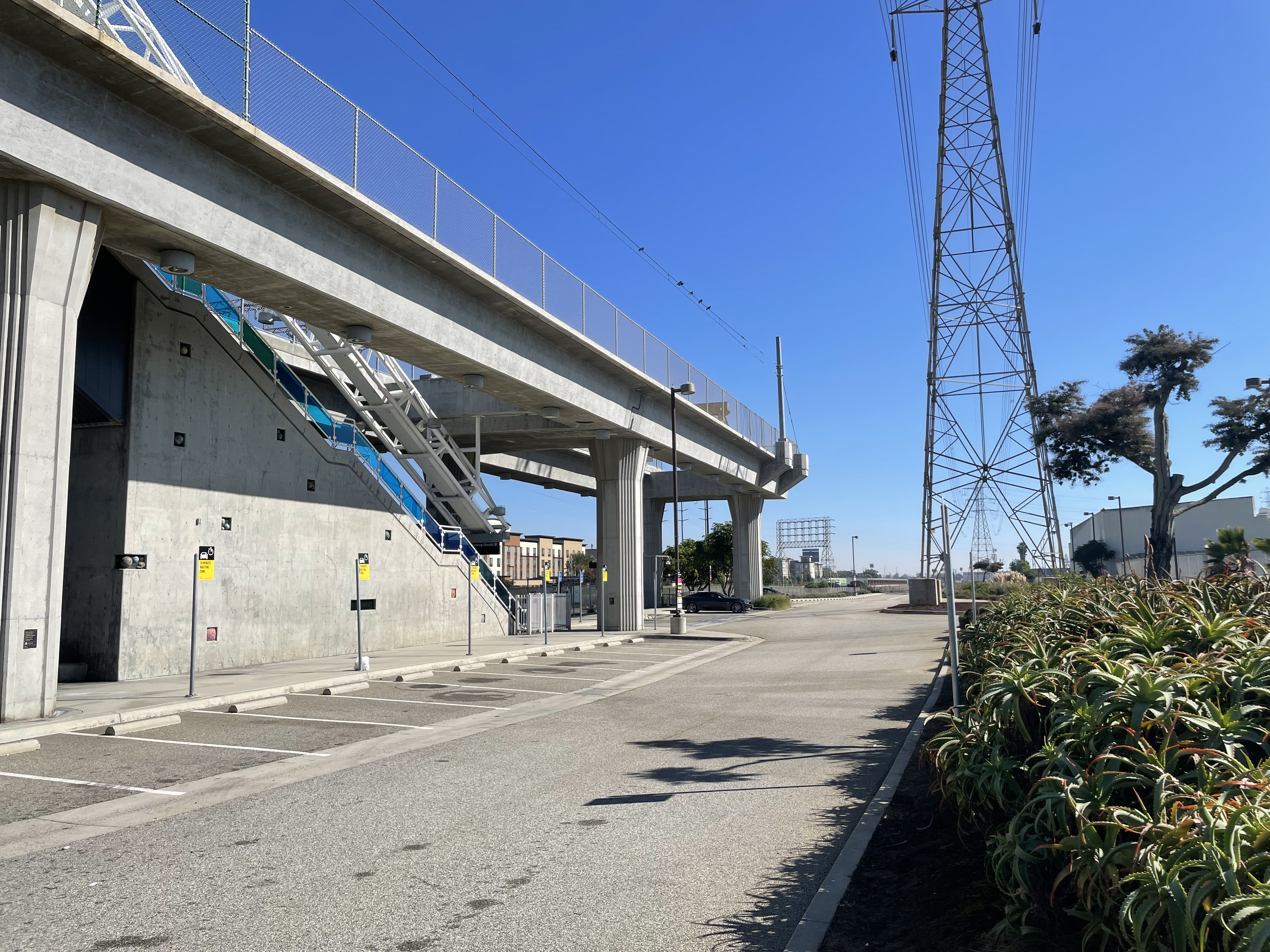
- Stub tracks at the southern end of Redondo Beach station

Overview
- Status: Environmental review
- Locale: Redondo Beach; Lawndale; Torrance
- Termini: Redondo Beach (current); Torrance Transit Center (future)
- Website: metro.net/projects/k-line-extension-to-torrance

Service
- Type: Light rail
- System: Los Angeles Metro Rail
- Operator: Los Angeles Metro

History
- Planned opening: 2036 (expected)

Technical
- Line length: 4.5 miles (7.2 km)
- Number of tracks: 2
- Character: Fully elevated
- Track gauge: 4 ft 8 1/2 in (1,435 mm) standard gauge
- Electrification: Overhead line, 750 V DC

The K Line Extension to Torrance (formerly the C Line Extension to Torrance, and before that the Green Line Extension to Torrance) is a project by Los Angeles Metro to extend the K Line from its terminus in Redondo Beach to Torrance. It is expected to open for service in 2036. During the initial planning phase, the project was known as the South Bay Metro Light Rail Extension and proposed as an extension of the C Line, but service changes in 2024 realigned the Redondo Beach segment to the K Line instead.

== Overview ==
Los Angeles Metro prepared an initial environmental study of a corridor extension of the C Line (since realigned to the K Line) from its Redondo Beach terminus toward the southeast. The extension roughly follows the Harbor Subdivision right of way into the South Bay, to the Torrance Transit Center (RTC).

A study of the South Bay Extension was necessary to initiate the publication of a draft environmental impact report (DEIR). The study was expected to be completed in 2011, but the project was placed on hold in the spring of 2012 due to uncertain funding. With the passage of Measure M in 2016, $619 million was earmarked for the Green Line Extension south and the study resumed. The timeline was also expected to be accelerated under the Twenty-eight by '28 initiative. The environmental impact report was scheduled to be released in March 2022, but was ultimately pushed back to fall/winter 2022. Preparing the report led the agency to study further alternatives for grade separations along the two routes. The draft environmental impact report was eventually released in January 2023. The final EIR was released on September 12, 2025.

== Route development ==
Four potential routes for the extension starting at Redondo Beach station were initially considered. The station in Lawndale was eliminated due to community opposition.

Harbor Subdivision main line, dating to 1888. Metro purchased 26.36 miles of this right of way in 1992.

Metro authorized two of four alternatives to move forward: Alternative #1 and Alternative #3. Metro staff recommended the two alternatives for the draft environmental impact statement (DEIR) status for further analysis and refinement in September 2018. The study area includes the former Harbor Subdivision right of way. The extension study consists of the Redondo Beach station to the Torrance Transit Center, a 4.5-mile (7.2 km) extension study area. Metro began composing the DEIR in January 2021 and released it in January 2023. Both alternatives shared the same alignment south of 190th Street.

The first alternative was expanded into two options, differing in whether the alignment is mainly built above grade over the existing ROW or in an open-air trench under the current ROW (with the freight ROW being rebuilt afterward). The route and stations were identical between the two options. Elements from the two options were then blended into a third "Hybrid Alternative" based on community input, which used the elevated/street level option from Redondo Beach station to 165th Street, where the alternative switched to the trench option all the way south to the Torrance Transit Center. The Hybrid Alternative also added two under-crossings at 170th Street and 182nd Street.

DEIR Alternative	Description	Ridership (daily)	Estimated cost (billions)
Alternative 1: ROW Alignment	A light rail (LRT) line heading south from the Redondo Beach station on the ROW of Harbor Subdivision. A stop at the Redondo Beach Transit Center adjacent to Pacific Crest Cemetery between Grant Ave and 182nd St. On 190th St., it continues southeast along the ROW with a terminus at the Torrance Transit Center. A 7-minute ride.	10,340	$0.893
Alternative 3: Hawthorne Alignment	A light rail (LRT) line heading southeast from Redondo Beach station parallel to I-405, which then heads south on Hawthorne Boulevard. Two new stations, a South Bay Galleria mall station and a station at Torrance Transit Center in Torrance along the Harbor Subdivision ROW at 465 Crenshaw Blvd. A 9-minute ride.	10,640	$1 to 1.2

The following table shows which stations were proposed according to Alternatives 1 and 3:

Station Options	Alt 1	Alt 3	Connecting Rail/Bus Service	Community
Redondo Beach station (already built)	check	check		Redondo Beach
Redondo Beach Transit Center station	check	–	Beach Cities Transit	Redondo Beach
South Bay Galleria station	–	check		Redondo Beach
Torrance Transit Center station	check	check	Torrance Transit	Torrance

The option of utilizing the existing Metro-owned ROW has been complicated by the discovery of a gravestone, and encroachment of backyards onto the ROW.

=== Route selection: Alternative 3 ===
On April 17, 2024, Metro staff recommended a modified version of Alternative 1, known as the Hybrid Alternative, which followed the Metro-owned ROW, as their preferred LPA to Metro's board of directors. On May 23, 2024, the board of directors approved the Hybrid Alternative as the LPA at a board meeting, with the added caveats of further studying and refining the cost estimates of both alternatives, as well as the development of a refined funding plan for the project. On September 11, 2025, Metro released the final environmental impact report (FEIR) for the project. Metro stated that construction on the project could start as early as 2027, with the project estimated to be complete in 2036.

In January 2026, Metro's Planning and Programming Committee was scheduled to consider certifying the FEIR for the project at its January 14, 2026 meeting. However, the committee voted to postpone the certification decision to the board of directors' meeting on January 22, 2026, following political opposition from local residents, with the board ultimately unanimously approving Alternative 3 as the LPA instead of the Hybrid Alternative. The selection of the Hawthorne alignment attracted criticism from the City of Torrance, who had argued that this option, which involved acquisition of tax-generating businesses along Hawthorne Boulevard, would "devastate" the city's economy. It was also not clear if Cal Trans would allow use of its easement parallel to I-405.

Phase	Date opening	Station	City/Neighborhood	Connecting services
1	2036	South Bay Galleria station	Redondo Beach	
1	2036	Torrance Transit Center station	Torrance	

=== Community support ===
Torrance City Council, in a March 2024 meeting, solidified its support for the Metro K Line extension, offering support for the "right-of-way option" for the project's route into the city. In response to security concerns, the Metro has pledged to collaborate closely with local entities to develop and implement comprehensive safety and security measures.

On August 16, 2023, Metro conducted a survey in regards to the K Line extension, in which 67% of the voters supported the project. After releasing a Draft Environmental Impact Review (EIR) of the project on January 27, 2023, 66% of the comments prefer extending the K Line using the Metro ROW option.

A motion was passed for the Council of Governments to remain neutral on the specific alignment of the K Line Extension while showing overall support for the project's continuation to Torrance. This decision reflects a collective agreement among various city representatives, indicating a strong regional backing for enhancing public transportation options. The voting outcome was as follows:

- Yes: Carson, Gardena, Hermosa Beach, Inglewood, Lomita, Manhattan Beach, Rancho Palos Verdes (RPV), Redondo Beach, Rolling Hills (RH), Rolling Hills Estates (RHE)
- Abstain: Hawthorne
- No: Lawndale, Torrance
