= Torrance Transit Center =

Transport hub in Torrance, California

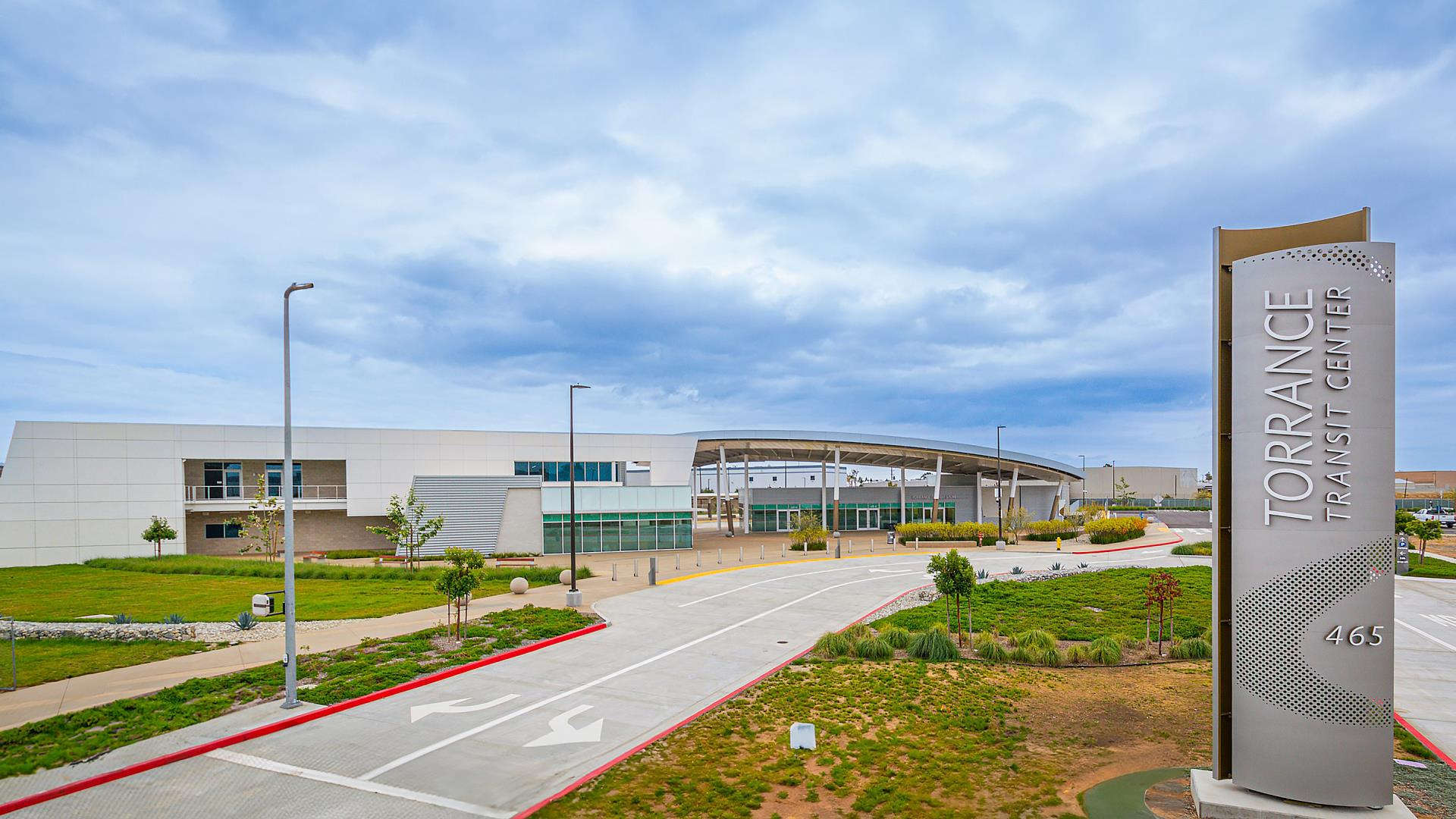

General information
- Other names: Mary K. Giordano Regional Transit Center
- Location: 465 Crenshaw Boulevard; Torrance, California
- Coordinates: 33.8421°N 118.3296°W
- Operator: Torrance Transit
- Line: See Services section
- Platforms: 1 island platform
- Bus stands: 8

Construction
- Parking: 250 spaces, kiss and ride facility
- Cycle facilities: 8 lockers, racks
- Accessible: Yes

History
- Opened: June 9, 2023
Future services
| Preceding station | Metro Rail | Following station |
|---|---|---|
| South Bay Galleria toward Expo/Crenshaw | K Line (2036) | Terminus |
Location

The Torrance Transit Center (officially the Mary K. Giordano Regional Transit Center) is a bus station in Torrance that serves as the city's transport hub. It opened on June 9, 2023.

FlixBus announced plans to service the center as of March 6, 2025.

Future plans for the transit center include light rail service. The transit center is located adjacent to the Harbor Subdivision, a freight rail line which is proposed as the route of the K Line Extension to Torrance. The K Line Extension to Torrance is expected to be completed by 2036.

== History ==
The previous bus hub in Torrance, located at the Del Amo Fashion Center, ceased operation in 2005. Design and contracting of the new facility was rebooted in 2013 as initial designs did not adequately facilitate riders' needs. Ground was broken for the station in 2018. The transit center held a grand opening "open house" on June 9, 2023. Two days later, on June 11, Torrance Transit underwent a service-wide change in which Lines 1, Rapid 3, 4X, 5, 6, and 10 started servicing the new transit center.

== Service ==
Seven Torrance Transit routes currently serve the Torrance Transit Center.

| Route | Bay | Destinations | | Notes |
|---|---|---|---|---|
| 1 | 2 | South LA; Harbor Freeway station | Torrance; Del Amo Fashion Center | |
| Rapid 3 | 8 | Long Beach; Downtown Long Beach station | | Weekday peak service only. |
| 4X | 6 | Downtown LA; LA Union Station | Torrance; Hawthorne Bl & Pacific Coast Hwy | Saturday trips end at Torrance Transit Center. No sunday service. |
| 5 | 3 | Torrance; El Camino College | Torrance; Pacific Coast Hwy & Crenshaw Bl | Interlines with Line 2, which serves Del Amo Fashion Center. |
| 6 | 4 | Torrance; Del Amo Fashion Center | Compton; Artesia station | Weekday peak service only. |
| 10 | 5 | Inglewood; Downtown Inglewood station | Torrance; Crenshaw Bl & Pacific Coast Hwy | |
| 10X | 1 | Inglewood; SoFi Stadium | | Football game days only. |
