= Balizza =

Fashion house in Italy

Balizza is a prêt-à-porter fashion house located in Milan, Italy which exports mostly to European countries, Russia, and the United States. Balizza was the first fashion group originally from Turkey to attend the Milan Fashion Week.

BALIZZA USA opened its first Americana retail boutique on April 7, 2013, at the Americana at Brand shopping community located in Glendale, California. The second boutique will open its doors on July 1 in Sherman Oaks, California at the Westfield Fashion Square Shopping Center.
