= Bullock's =

American department store chain

Bullocks
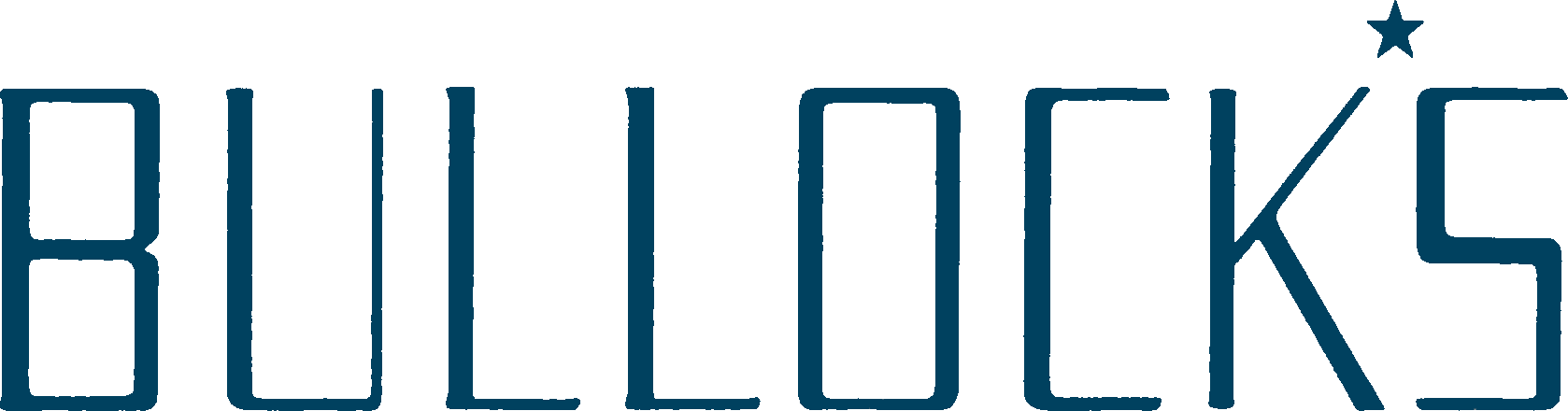

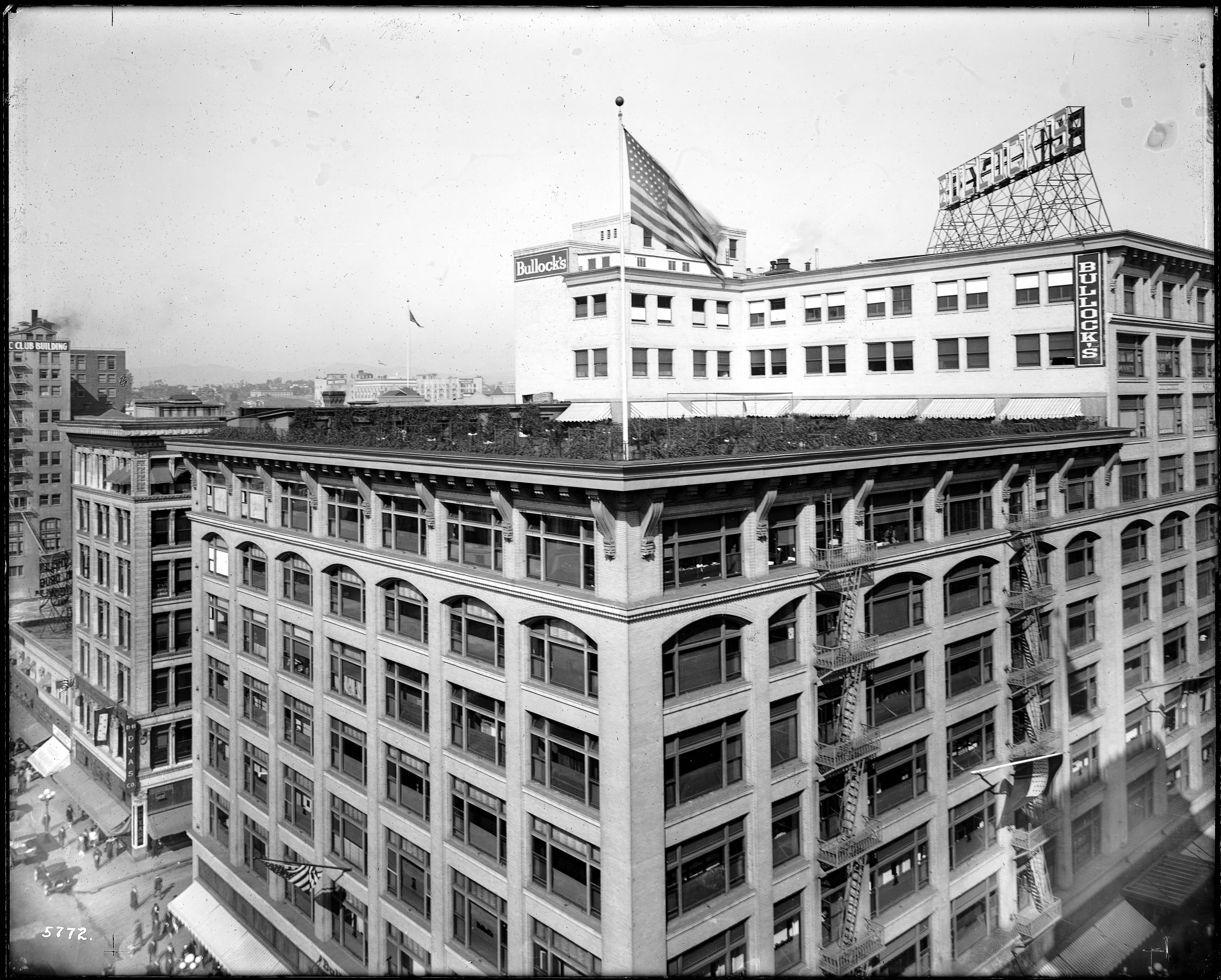
- Bullock's Downtown, 1917
- Founded: 1907; 119 years ago
- Founder: John G. Bullock
- Defunct: 1995; 31 years ago
- Fate: Merged into Macy's
- Headquarters: Los Angeles, California, US
- Areas served: Southern California, Phoenix, Las Vegas
- Parent: Federated Department Stores (1964-1988); Macy's (1988-1994); Federated Department Stores (1994-1995)

Bullock's was a chain of full-line department stores from 1907 through 1995, headquartered in Los Angeles, growing to operate across California, Arizona and Nevada. Bullock's also operated as many as seven more upscale Bullocks Wilshire specialty department stores across Southern California. Many former Bullock's locations continue to operate today as Macy's.

== History ==
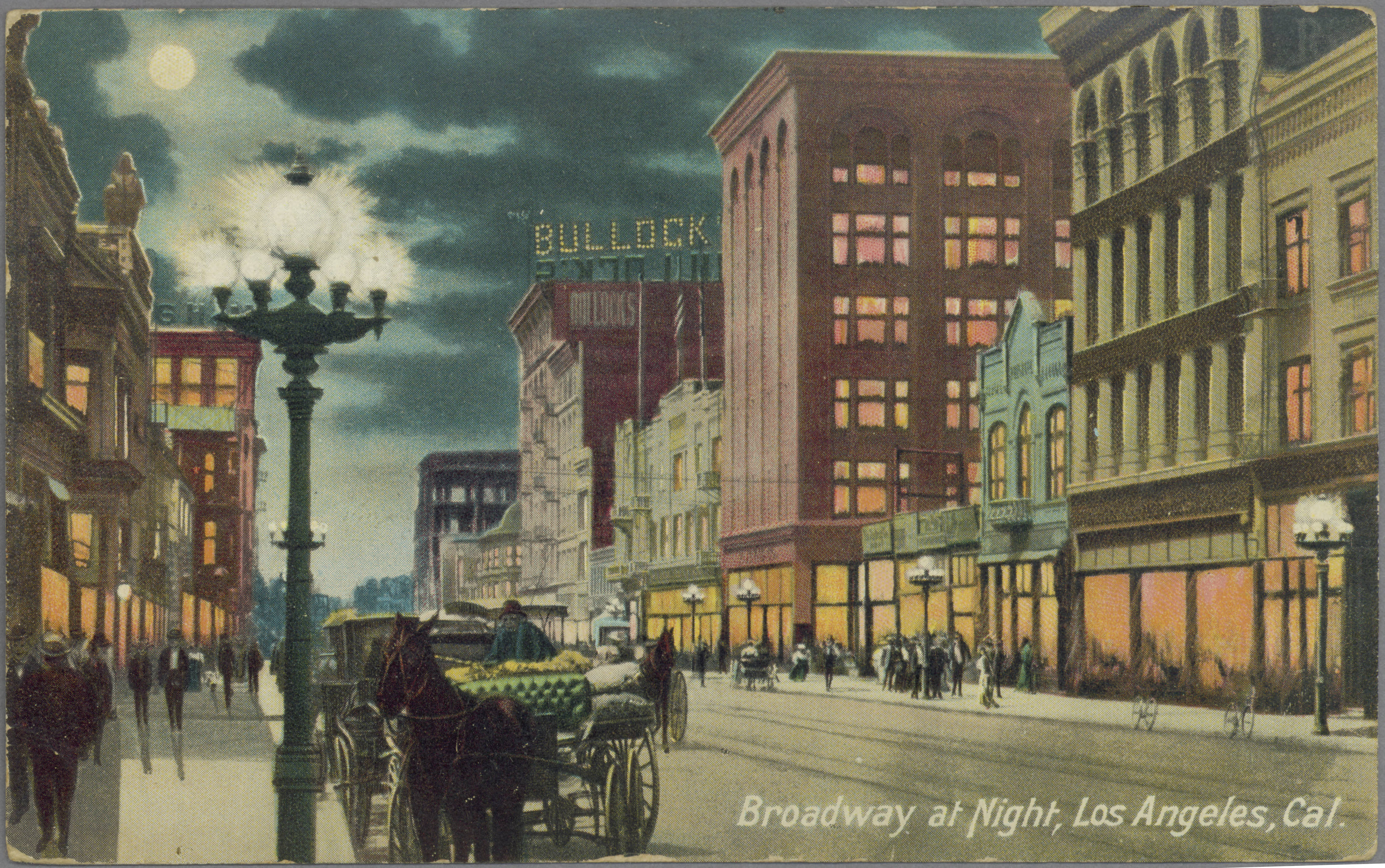
Postcard view of Broadway c. 1908, showing original store

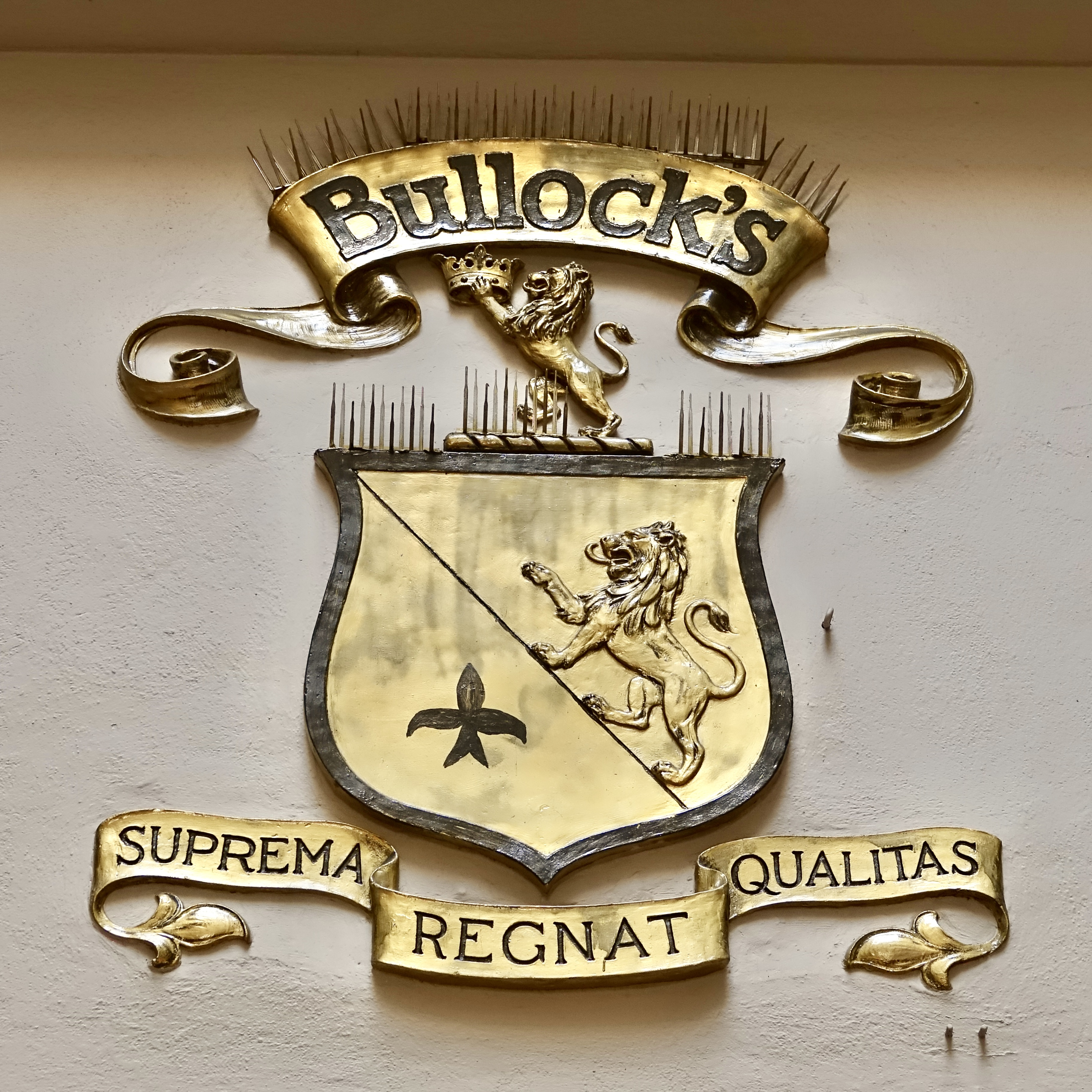
Bullock's logo on bridge across St. Vincent Court, 2019

Bullock's was founded in 1907 at Seventh and Broadway in downtown Los Angeles by John G. Bullock, with the support of The Broadway Department Store owner Arthur Letts. In 1923, Bullock and business partner P.G. Winnett bought out Letts' interest after his death and the companies became completely separated. In 1929 Bullock & Winnett opened a luxury branch on Wilshire Boulevard, referred to at the time as Bullock's Wilshire (the apostrophe would later be removed).

In 1944 Bullock's acquired I. Magnin & Co., a venerable San Francisco-based upscale specialty chain.

Starting in 1958, Bullock's built a series of four shopping centers initially called Bullock's Fashion Square, small, elegant, and open-air, with large Bullock's stores dominating, surrounded by only around 20 or 30 much smaller specialty stores, such as I. Magnin, Desmond's, Mandel's and Silverwoods. The total gross buildable area of Bullock's Santa Ana, for example was 340,000 square feet (32,000 m^{2}), versus only 238,000 square feet (22,100 m^{2}) for all the other retailers combined. Bullock's Fashion Square in Santa Ana opened in 1958, followed by a Fashion Square for the San Fernando Valley (later "Sherman Oaks Fashion Square") in 1962, a Fashion Square in Torrance (later called "Del Amo Fashion Square") in September 1966 and Fashion Square in La Habra (which uniquely included a Buffum's branch from the beginning) in April 1968.

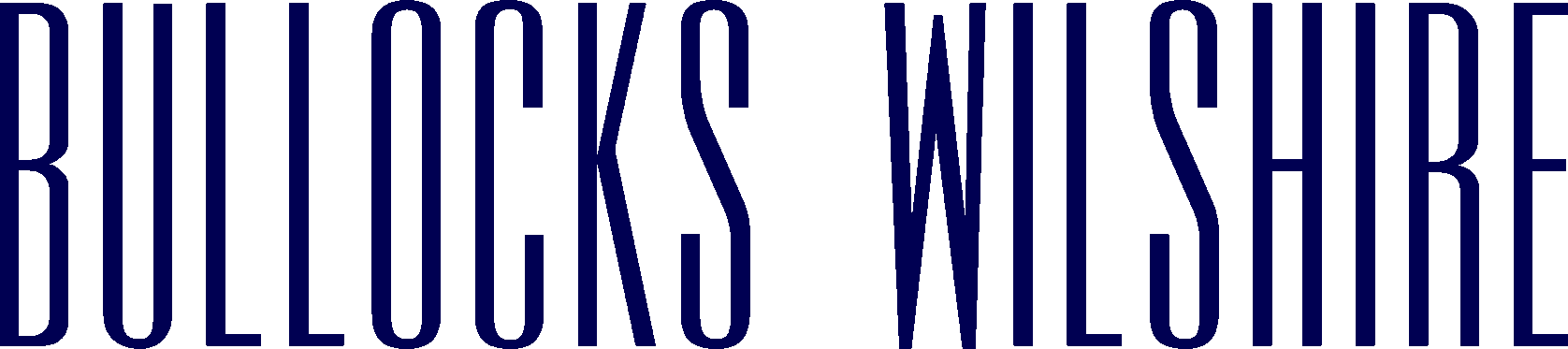
Bullocks Wilshire final logo

In 1964 the then public-owned Bullock's/I. Magnin organization was acquired by Federated Department Stores, much to the dismay of surviving founder P.G. Winnett, who publicly lambasted the deal (which was initiated by his own son-in-law, Bullock's President Walter W. Candy Jr.). In the 1970s, to differentiate itself from the full-line Bullock's stores, the very exclusive Wilshire location dropped its apostrophe, and became Bullocks Wilshire, and began its own expansion.

In February 1970, Federated Department Stores replaced its Bullock's Realty Corporation, which owned and managed the Fashion Square malls, with an organization called Transwest Management; Transwest sold the Torrance (future "Del Amo") Fashion Square in March of that year to new co-owners Great Lakes and Guilford Glazer and Associates, while selling the three other Fashion Squares for $13 million to Urban Investment and Development Company (UIDC), who would sell them in 1973 to Bank of America Realty Investor and Draper and Kramer for $16.3 million.

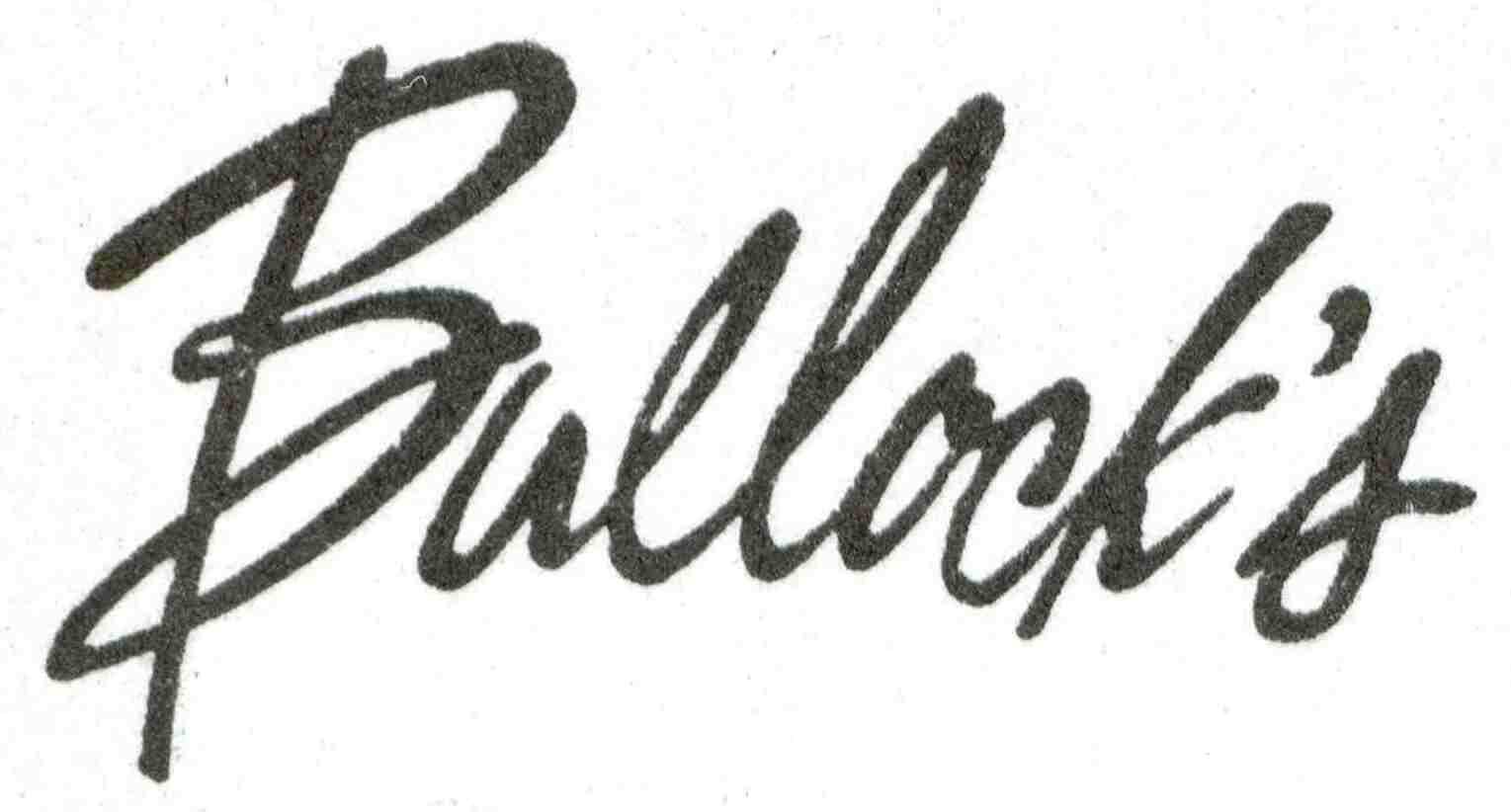
Bullock's logo between c.1980–1985

Bullock's, Bullocks Wilshire, and I. Magnin retained their autonomy under Federated, as well as their "carriage trade" niche, with I. Magnin expanding into the Chicago and Washington, D.C. metropolitan areas and Bullock's opening stores in Phoenix, Las Vegas and Northern California. In 1983 however, Federated shuttered the Bullock's North division and sold most of its locations to Seattle, Washington retailer Nordstrom. In 1988, after an ugly takeover battle between Robert Campeau and Macy's for Federated, Bullock's and I. Magnin were sold by Campeau to Macy's as a consolation prize for one billion dollars, which plunged Macy's into debt. The new owners responded by dismantling Bullock's Los Angeles corporate offices, merging Bullocks Wilshire into I. Magnin, and Bullock's into its Macy's South division, sending what had been Federated's most profitable division into a precipitous decline and alienating customers.

The end came quickly for Bullock's after Macy's filed for bankruptcy protection in 1992, with the Bullocks Wilshire stores being renamed I. Magnin two years before. Underperforming I. Magnin and Bullock's locations were closed, and I. Magnin itself was dissolved in January 1995 once Federated Department Stores reappeared on the scene and acquired Macy's. In 1996—following the acquisition of Broadway Stores, Inc.—Federated consolidated all its traditional department-store business in California under the Macy's nameplate, ending 89 years of Bullock's.

=== Luxury market ===
Although the Bullocks Wilshire stores were deemed the most exclusive, the full-line Bullock's stores offered upscale designers such as Giorgio Armani, Jean-Paul Gaultier, Missoni, Krizia, Stephen Sprouse, Valentino, Salvatore Ferragamo, Byblos, Hugo Boss, Gieves & Hawkes, and Robert Graham. Under Federated, the 22 Bullock's stores offered consistent assortments in each location, a key to the company's profit and success (exceptions were the Lakewood, West Covina, Carlsbad and Grossmont, California, locations.) Under the corporate oversight of Macy's South in Atlanta, the 22 Bullock's stores were divided into three competing regions: merchant offices with extremely limited control were established in Santa Ana, Sherman Oaks and the existing 800 South Hope Street building. Macy's, now under tremendous debt, national economic issues and having alienated customers with swift and usually reactive changes to the Bullock's brand, focused and relied on South Coast Plaza, Sherman Oaks and Beverly Center to retain an upscale clientele.

== Store list ==
Only full line Bullock's division stores. Note: "Closing" refers to store closing date as Bullock's or Macy's.

No.	Name	Address/Mall	Opened (M/D/YYYY)	Closed* (M/D/YYYY)	Building Current Use	Notes
01	Downtown / Bullock's complex	Broadway, 7th, and Hill Street, Downtown Los Angeles (freestanding)	3/4/1907	6/26/1983	St. Vincent Jewelry Center	1907 (at opening) 350,000 square feet (33,000 m^{2}) at 641 S. Broadway.; Added more buildings over time: 1912: 10-story brick and concrete structure by Morgan & Walls with an almost identical (to the first building) brick and terra cotta facade. Adjacent to the north at 639 S. Broadway.; 1917, 1919 expanded to 460,000 sq. ft.; 1923-28 Added 400,000 sq. ft. via three more additions and purchase of two adjacent buildings.; 1934: Added Store for Men on Hill Street, its last large-scale enlargement; built bridge over Saint Vincent's Court.; 806,000 square feet (74,900 m^{2}) at closing.
	Wilshire	3050 Wilshire Boulevard, Los Angeles (freestanding)	9/24/1929	4/13/1993 (as BW flagship)	Southwestern Law School	became "Bullocks Wilshire"(separate division) ca. 1972, then rebranded I. Magnin along with all other BW branches
	Palm Springs; Resort Store		November 1930		Razed to make way for the Desert Inn Fashion Plaza, which was in turn razed in 2013.	This was a Spanish Colonial-style "resort store" within the Desert Inn complex, replaced by a full Bullock's branch in 1947.
	Westwood Collegienne	1002 Westwood Boulevard	5/14/1932	Replaced by full-line store 1951	Vacant (previously Sur La Table)	This was a specialist "Collegienne" store designed in Spanish Colonial style by Parkinson & Parkinson and built by Janss Investment Corporation at a cost reported variously as $150,000 and $185,000.
03	Pasadena	402 South Lake Avenue (freestanding)	9/19/1947	-	Macy's	Architects Wurdeman & Becket
	Palm Springs (full branch)	151 South Palm Canyon Drive	10/18/47		Razed to make way for The Mercado and a new Saks Fifth Avenue.	Modernist building, replaced the Desert Inn "resort shop". Became a Bullocks Wilshire branch in the 1960s. Architects Wurdeman & Becket.
04	Westwood	10861 Weyburn (SE corner Westwood and Weyburn), L.A. (freestanding)	9/5/1951		Target	Replaced "Westwood Collegienne" store; architect Welton Becket. Was a Macy's from 1996 to 1999.
07	Santa Ana	Santa Ana Fashion Square	9/17/1958	-	Macy's	This was the first of four Bullock's Fashion Square centers. Architects Pereira & Luckman. Mall was built out extensively and is now called MainPlace.
09	San Fernando/ Valley/Sherman Oaks	Sherman Oaks Fashion Square	4/30/1962	-	Macy's	
10	Lakewood	Lakewood Center	4/26/1965	1993	Razed	Razed 1995, now site of The Home Depot and a supermarket
12	Del Amo	Del Amo Fashion Square, Torrance	9/12/1966	-	Macy's (Main)	
15	La Habra	La Habra Fashion Square, razed, now site of La Habra Market Place strip mall	8/12/1968	1992	Razed	Razed in late 1990s
17	Northridge	Northridge Fashion Center	9/10/1971		Macy's	Store was rebuilt new after 1994 Northridge earthquake
18	South Coast Plaza	South Coast Plaza, Costa Mesa, California	9/26/1973	-	Macy's	
19	Mission Valley	Mission Valley Center, San Diego	2/19/1975	-	Macy's Home & Furniture	
20	West Covina	Plaza West Covina	9/25/1975	2008, Macy's consolidated into former Robinsons-May store	Razed	Razed in 2008, now site of Best Buy. 150,000 sq.ft. Welton Becket & Assoc., architects
21	Century City	Century Square, later Century City Shopping Center, now Westfield Century City	9/9/1976	-	Nordstrom (formerly Macy's)	
22	Scottsdale	Scottsdale Fashion Square	1/31/1977	1996	part of Dillard's	
23	Chris-Town	Chris-Town Mall, Phoenix	November 1987	(closed)	Razed to make way for Target.	
24	Mission Viejo	Mission Viejo Mall	3/3/1980	-	Macy's	
25	Carlsbad	Plaza Camino Real (and other names), now The Shoppes at Carlsbad	10/2/80		Macy's Men's, Home & Furniture	
26	Las Vegas	Fashion Show Mall	2/14/1981		Macy's	
27	Beverly Center	Beverly Center, Los Angeles	4/4/1982	-	Macy's	
28	Manhattan Beach	Manhattan Village	4/4/1982	-	Macy's	
29	Thousand Oaks	The Oaks	8/4/1983	-	Macy's Men's, Home & Children's	
30	Grossmont	Grossmont Center, La Mesa	9/15/1983	1993	Target	
31	Palm Desert	Palm Desert Town Center	11/3/1983	2006, Macy's moved into former Robinsons-May store	Partially razed	Razed above ground, underground level is part of Macy's Furniture Store
32	Citicorp Plaza	Seventh Market Place, now FIGat7th, Downtown Los Angeles	8/4/1986	1996	Gold's Gym (level M1), Target (level M2), Zara (level M3)	In this mall, the Robinsons-May became the Macy's, which also later closed as there was a Macy's in nearby Broadway Plaza.
74*	Burbank	Burbank Town Center	9/2/1992	-	Macy's	*opened under Macy's ownership, 74 was under Macy's numbering scheme

== Selected divisions ==
=== Bullocks Wilshire ===
Bullocks Wilshire was one of the more important divisions of Bullock's, Inc. until it was consolidated into I. Magnin by Macy's in 1989. The division could be traced to the opening of a single luxury branch store of Bullock's in 1929. In 1968, The Bullock's store in Palm Springs (built in 1947) was transferred to the control of Bullock's Wilshire to be its first branch store. Four years later, in 1972, Bullock's Wilshire store was separated from Bullock's as a separate division with its own, president, chairman, buyers and staff with Walter Bergquist, former president of Bullock's, assigned as the division's first president.

=== I. Magnin ===
I. Magnin was acquired in 1944 and stores in this division were kept separate from those of Bullock's and the other divisions. Many I. Magnin stores were near the first Bullock's branches and complemented them in such as fashion that Bullock's purposely placed I. Magnin branches in three of the four Fashion Square malls that it built (in addition to inviting Desmond's, Silverwoods and other Fashion businesses not owned by Bullock's). The division lasted until 1994 when Macy's liquidated the brand and converted some of the stores to Macy's stores, selling some to Saks Fifth Avenue, and closing the rest.

=== Bullock's North ===
In the early 1970s, Federated wanted to move into the San Francisco Bay Area, an area of the country in which they never had any stores and was dominated by stores owned by Macy's and Broadway-Hale. Federated decided to open a new division that reported directly to Federated, but chose a name, Bullock's North, that had some name recognition in Northern California, but was distinct enough from its sister division to the south.

The first store in the division opened at the Stanford Shopping Center in Palo Alto in March 1972. It had 150,000 square feet on two floors. Two years later, a second store was opened in downtown Walnut Creek in 1974, followed by a third store that was opened in the following year at the Vallco Fashion Park in Cupertino.

A store was originally scheduled to open in Marin County the following year. Federated obtained property and even received clearance from the Corte Madera City Council to start construction, but resistance by local residents was so strong that they were able to obtain a recall election and were able to eject the city council members that had voted in favor for the new store off the council and thus killing the project. A fourth store opened in 1977 at the Stonestown shopping center in San Francisco and was followed by the opening of a fifth store in 1978 at the Oakridge Mall in San Jose. In 1982, Bullock's North opened its sixth and final store in the ill-fated Fashion Island Mall in San Mateo. This particular store was unusual because the store was covered by a tent instead of a conventional roof. The unusual roof was probably one of the reasons why Federated was unable to sell this particular store and closed the store as soon as the lease had expired.

A year later, Federated closed the division and sold five of the stores and quietly closed the San Mateo store. Nordstrom purchased three stores while Emporium-Capwell and Mervyn's each purchased a single store.

=== Bullock's Woman ===
In the late 1980s, Federated recognized that many of their young affluent women customers were unable to find youthful designer clothing in plus sizes and that very few stores were catering to that market, with the exception of Lane Bryant, Federated decided to test the idea that the plus-sized market young adult market was under-served by opening a stand-alone shop called Bullock's Woman in an upscale Las Vegas mall that already held a full-line Bullock's department store in March 1987. After operating the store for a few months, Federated determined that the venture was profitable enough to expand the concept to other malls containing Bullock's and/or Bullocks Wilshire by opening second and third stores in Palm Desert and in Woodland Hills in September 1987.

By 1992, other units were opened in Burbank, Century City and Santa Ana. When the Bullock's and Broadway nameplates were replaced with that of Macy's in 1996, a situation was created in which Macy's inherited excess floor space in the same malls that held the stand-alone Bullock's Woman stores so these were eventually integrated into the nearest Macy's store as the Macy's Woman department which specialized in the plus-sized designer clothing market

== See also ==
- List of department stores converted to Macy's
- List of defunct department stores of the United States
