= Torrance Transit =

Public transportation (bus) system serving Torrance and nearby communities

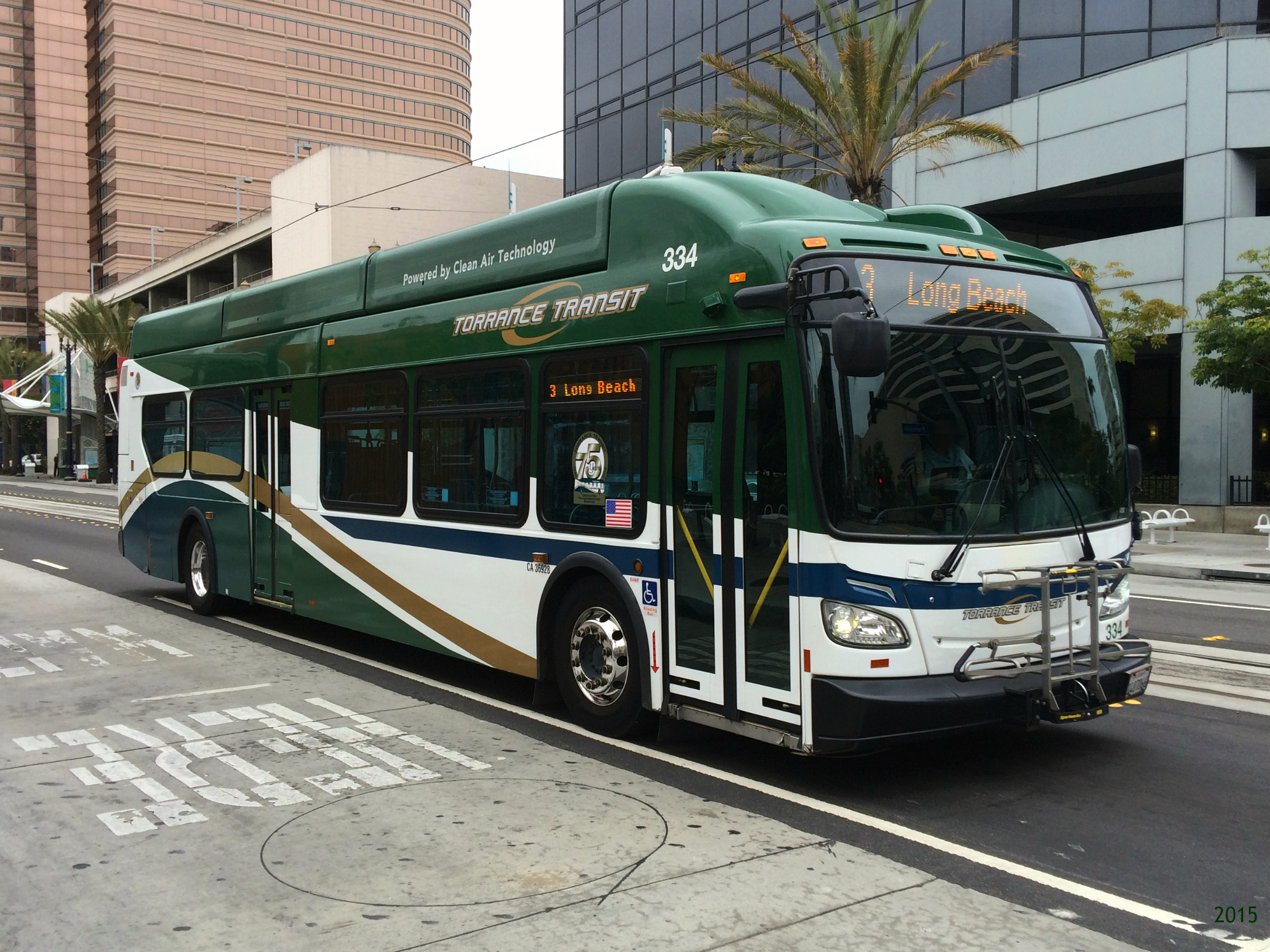
- Torrance Transit bus in Downtown Long Beach
- Parent: City of Torrance
- Founded: 1940; 86 years ago
- Service area: South Bay, Los Angeles County, California
- Service type: Bus service
- Routes: 12
- Fleet: 63 buses
- Daily ridership: 9,200 (weekdays, Q2 2026)
- Annual ridership: 2,614,600 (2025)
- Fuel type: Gasoline, CNG
- Chief executive: Kim Turner
- Website: transit.torranceca.gov

Torrance Transit is a transit agency primarily serving the South Bay region of Los Angeles County. In 2025, the system had a ridership of 2,614,600, or about 9,200 per weekday as of the second quarter of 2026.

== History ==
Torrance Transit inaugurated service on January 15, 1940 using three leased 1931 Mack-33 buses. The new agency provided primarily municipal transit and maintained a bus terminal in downtown Los Angeles until 1959, when the City Council voted to discontinue bus service entirely. Mayor Albert Isen vetoed the council's action, arguing that "every first-class city has its own bus system."

== Routes ==
=== Local routes ===
Torrance Transit does not operate on Thanksgiving, Christmas or New Year's Day. Service on Memorial Day, Independence Day and Labor Day operates on Sunday schedule, while service on Christmas Eve and New Year’s Eve operates on a Saturday schedule.

Route	Terminals		via	Notes
1	South LA; Harbor Freeway station	Torrance; Del Amo Fashion Center	Figueroa St, Vermont Av, Torrance Bl	Serves Harbor Gateway Transit Center and Torrance Transit Center
2	Torrance; El Camino College	Torrance; Del Amo Fashion Center	Crenshaw Bl, Artesia Bl, Anza Av	Serves South Bay Galleria and Redondo Beach Transit Center; Interlines with Line 5
3	Redondo Beach; Redondo Beach Pier	Long Beach; Downtown Long Beach station	Carson St, Main St, Pacific Coast Hwy	Serves Del Amo Fashion Center; Operates alongside limited-stop Rapid 3
5	Torrance; El Camino College	Torrance; Pacific Coast Hwy & Crenshaw Bl	Van Ness Av, Arlington Av, Narbonne Av	Serves Torrance Transit Center; Interlines with Line 2
6	Torrance; Del Amo Fashion Center	Compton; Artesia station	190th St	Serves Torrance Transit Center, Harbor Gateway Transit Center and Cal State Dominguez Hills
7	Redondo Beach; Redondo Beach Pier	Carson; Sepulveda Bl & Avalon Bl	Sepulveda Bl	Serves Del Amo Fashion Center; Interlines with Line 9
8	Westchester; LAX/Metro Transit Center	Torrance; Hawthorne Bl & Pacific Coast Hwy	Aviation Bl, Hawthorne Bl	Serves Aviation/Imperial station, South Bay Galleria, Del Amo Fashion Center
9	Torrance; Del Amo Fashion Center	Carson; Sepulveda Bl & Avalon Bl	Lomita Bl	Interlines with Line 7
10	Inglewood; Downtown Inglewood station	Torrance; Crenshaw Bl & Pacific Coast Hwy	Crenshaw Bl, Imperial Hwy, Prairie Av	Serves Kia Forum, SoFi Stadium, YouTube Theater, Intuit Dome and Torrance Transit Center
13	Redondo Beach; Torrance Bl & Broadway	Compton; Artesia station	Catalina Av, Hermosa Av, Artesia Bl, Victoria Ave, Central Av	Serves South Bay Galleria, Harbor Gateway Transit Center and Cal State Dominguez Hills

=== Rapid & Express routes ===
Route	Terminals		Via	Notes
Rapid 3	Torrance; Torrance Transit Center	Long Beach; Downtown Long Beach station	Carson St, Avalon Bl, Pacific Coast Hwy	Serves Del Amo Fashion Center; Operates weekday rush hours only.; Operates alongside local service Line 3
4X	Downtown LA; LA Union Station	Torrance; Hawthorne Bl & Pacific Coast Hwy (weekdays)	In Downtown LA: Alameda St, Los Angeles St, Hill St, Grand Av, Olive St, Flower St; Express Portion: Harbor Transitway; In the South Bay: Vermont Av, Torrance Bl, Hawthorne Bl	Serves Harbor Gateway Transit Center and Torrance Transit Center
4X	Downtown LA; LA Union Station	Torrance; Torrance Transit Center (Saturdays)	In Downtown LA: Alameda St, Los Angeles St, Hill St, Grand Av, Olive St, Flower St; Express Portion: Harbor Transitway; In the South Bay: Vermont Av, Torrance Bl, Hawthorne Bl	Serves Harbor Gateway Transit Center and Torrance Transit Center
10X	Inglewood; SoFi Stadium	Torrance; Torrance Transit Center	Crenshaw Bl, Imperial Hwy, Prairie Av	Operates on football home games only

== Bus fleet ==
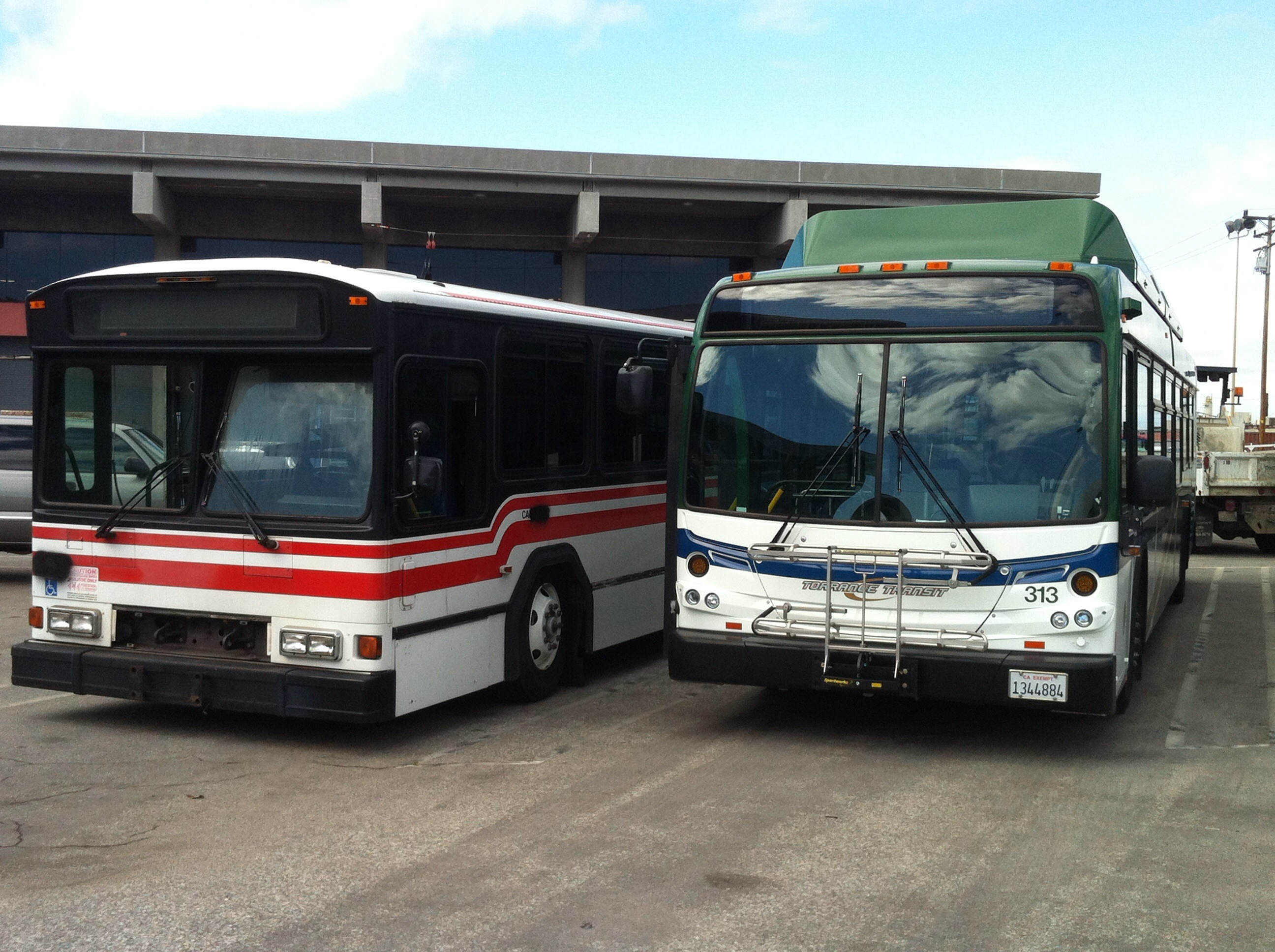
Gillig Phantom (left, red and white livery) and New Flyer C40LFR (right, new livery) buses for Torrance Transit (2012)

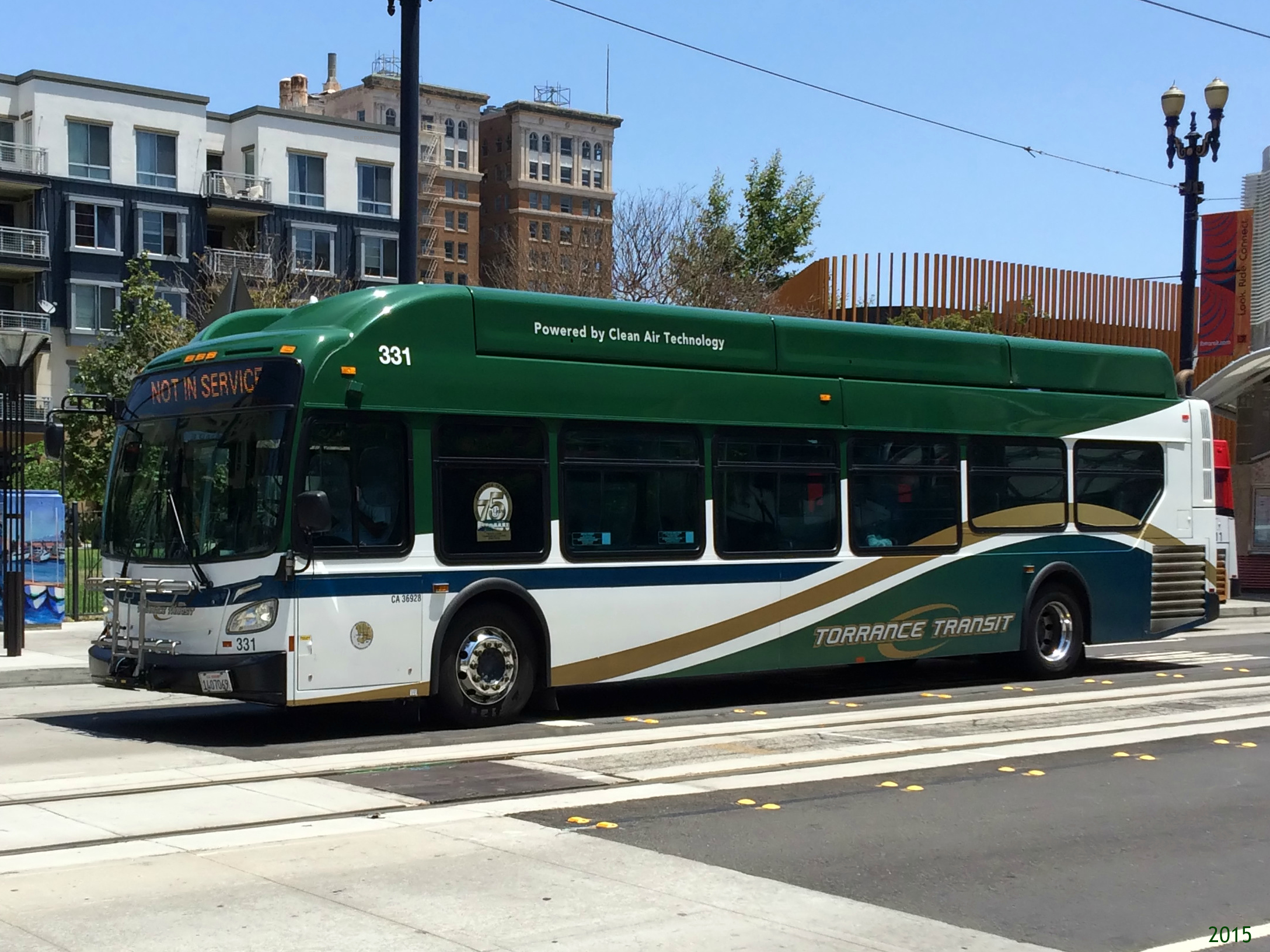
Torrance Transit 2012 New Flyer Xcelsior on Route 3 in Downtown Long Beach

=== Active fleet ===
In the early 21st century, Torrance Transit's fleet was made up of Gillig Phantom (delivered in 1992, 1996, and 1997) and Gillig Advantage (delivered in 2000 and 2002) buses. Each bus is numbered 4--. The fleet is maintained at the facilities department on Madrona Avenue, constructed in 1986.

In 2010, Torrance Transit began replacing its bus fleet with a purchase of 10 gasoline-electric hybrid New Flyer (NFI) GE40LFRs; 20 compressed natural gas (CNG)-powered NFI C40LFRs were delivered in 2011, joined by 9 more CNG NFI XN40s in 2012. The new buses were delivered with a new paint scheme which marked the start of a rebranding effort by the agency.

Make/Model	Fleet numbers	Year	Engines	Transmission
New Flyer GE40LFR	300–309	2010	Ford Triton V10	ISE ThunderVolt TB40-HG
New Flyer C40LFR	310–329	2011	Cummins Westport ISL G EPA10	Allison B400R
New Flyer XN40	330–338	2012	Cummins Westport ISL G EPA10	Allison B400R
New Flyer XN40	339-362	2016	Cummins Westport ISL G EPA13	Allison B400R
New Flyer XN40	363-382	2026	Cummins Westport L9N	Allison B400R

=== ZEST ===
In 1993, Torrance Transit rolled out the Zero Emissions Surface Transit (ZEST) bus, a 25-seat, 29-foot coach which was the largest battery-powered transit vehicle in the United States at the time. ZEST was built by Specialty Vehicle Manufacturing Corporation (SVMC) using a Hughes Aircraft Company-developed powertrain, at a cost of US$300,000 (equivalent to $669,000 in 2025). SVMC in turn had subcontracted the assembly of ZEST to the ACL Technologies division of AAI Corporation, a defense contractor. ZEST had a claimed range of 75 miles (121 km) or 10 hours of operation, and the battery pack was designed to be easily replaceable to minimize the time spent out of service while charging.

After several years in operation, service was trimmed back from the morning and afternoon peak commutes to just a lunchtime shuttle from employers to restaurants in order to extend its life. In an interview, John Hall with Torrance Transit stated "[The battery technology] is a long way from where it needs to be. Its useful hours [of service] are not enough. We have learned a lot making this a worthwhile investment. It has a ways to go before it gets to an everyday transit application."

=== Hybrids ===
In 2000, Torrance Transit took delivery of two Orion VI hybrid buses equipped with Lockheed-developed HybriDrive series hybrid powertrains. One of the buses, fleet no. 401, was damaged beyond repair in a fire that occurred on September 25, 2002; nearly four years later in June 2006, Orion Bus Industries agreed to buy back the burned hulk from Torrance for $80,000. The remaining Orion VI continued to serve through at least 2010, but was dropped from the fleet by 2014.

The ten gasoline-electric hybrid New Flyer GE40LFR buses delivered in 2010 were procured as part of a joint purchase with other California transit agencies, with Montebello Bus Lines serving as the lead agency. Under the terms of the pilot program, the federal government subsidy was increased from 80% to 90% of the cost of each hybrid bus.
