= South Bay Galleria =

Shopping mall in Redondo Beach, California

Coordinates: 33°52′16″N 118°21′18″W

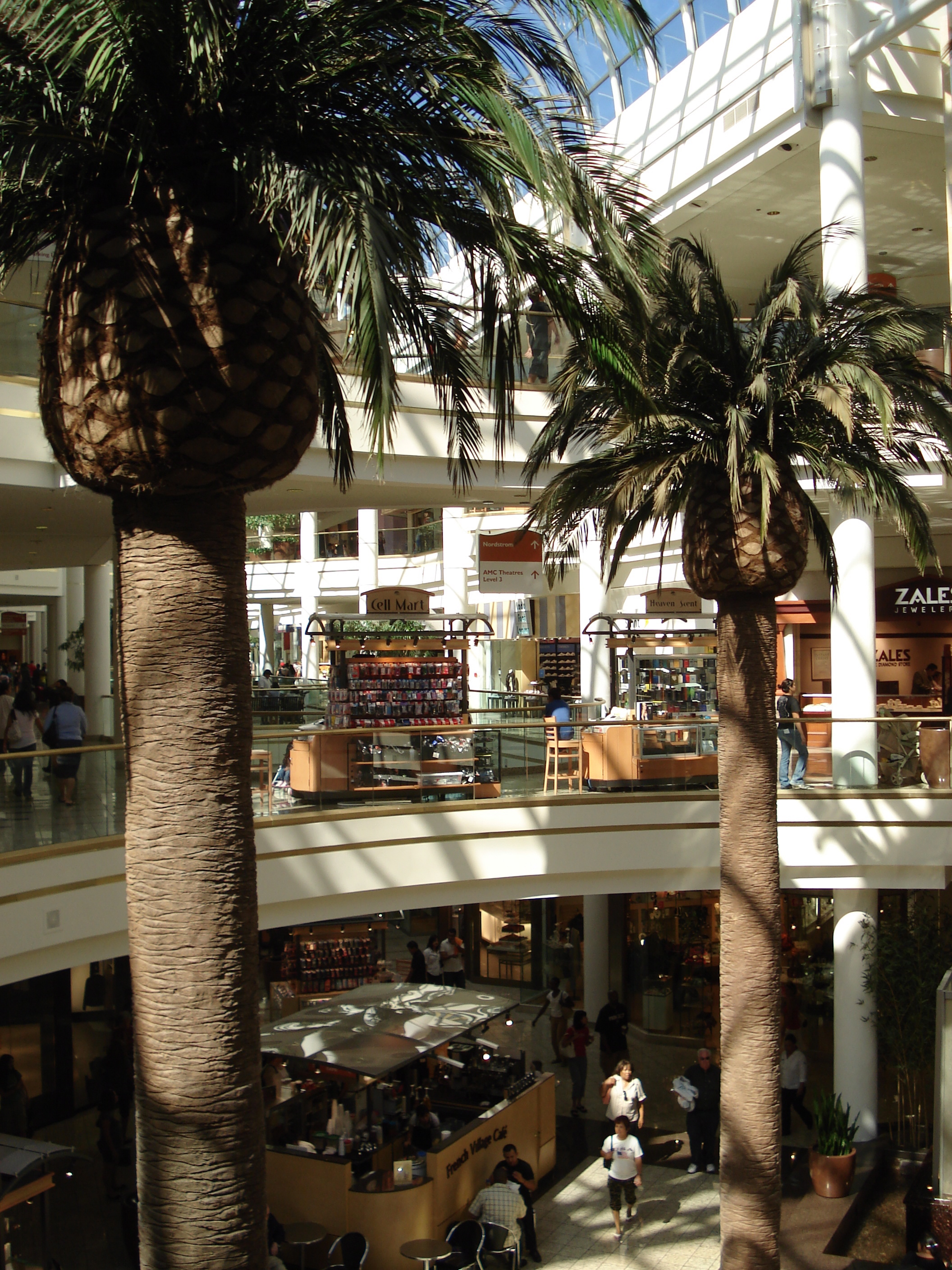
- Location: Redondo Beach, California, U.S.
- Opened: 1985
- Developer: Forest City Development
- Manager: Kennedy Wilson CBRE (leasing)
- Owner: Kennedy Wilson
- Num. of stores: 125
- Num. of anchor tenants: 6
- Floor area: 955,000 ft^{2} (88,700 m^{2})
- Floors: 3 (1 in Q and former Wetzel's Pretzels, 2 in A, H&M, Kohl's, and Wonder of Dinosaurs, 5 in Parking Garage, closed basement in Macy's)
- Website: www.southbaygalleria.com

South Bay Galleria, formerly named Galleria at South Bay, is a shopping mall located in Redondo Beach, California, United States. It is anchored by Macy's, Kohl's, Q, Wonder of Dinosaurs, and a 16-screen AMC Theatres multiplex.

== History ==
In February 1955, it was announced that a major shopping center on a 50-acre site at 174th Street and Hawthorne Boulevard would be constructed. The center was officially opened on August 22, 1959, as the "South Bay Center" (or simply as "SBC"). The architects were A. Quincy Jones, Frederick Emmons and Victor Gruen Associates. The center included a large, freestanding, four-story May Company department store, designed by Albert C. Martin and Associates (with a public fallout shelter in the basement). The store also included a book and record department, furniture department, camera shop, soda fountain and the sit-down "Bay Shore Tea Room" restaurant. Surrounding the department store was an "open air" shopping center with shaded outdoor "breezeways." There were 37 tenants on opening day. The grand opening featured a circus in the parking lot and a draw for a car as a grand prize.

On November 1, 1960, the Democratic nominee for President, John F. Kennedy, gave a speech at the South Bay Center on the last stop of his campaign tour. Kennedy won the general election eight days later, becoming the 35th President of the United States. During the 1960s and 1970s, many stores would open and replace older ones. In the south parking lot, a car wash and theater opened. Later on, some new tenants made their debut in the late 1960s and mid-1970s, which included Sunset House Gifts, Florsheim Shoes, Nobby, Pier One Imports, and Putney Station Restaurant at the north parking lot near Artesia Blvd.

In 1985 Forest City Development built a fully enclosed indoor mall to replace the open-air shopping center, to become the "Galleria at South Bay." It included additional anchors Nordstrom and Mervyn's, which had opened a few months earlier.

In 1992 Forest City sold a half-interest in the center to CalPERS, before buying it back in 2001 and changing the official name to South Bay Galleria. In the meantime the May Company store had adopted the Robinsons-May name in 1993 and General Cinema had constructed a 16-screen multiplex cinema in 1997, before the company was sold to AMC Theatres in 2002. In September 2006, the Robinsons-May store was renamed Macy's.

In December 2008, the Mervyn's department store chain closed all of its stores due to bankruptcy, including the South Bay Galleria store. In December 2008, it was also announced that the Kohl's department store chain had bought 48 Mervyn's properties, including the South Bay Galleria property, and would take over the retail space that was formerly occupied by Mervyn's.

Four years later, on December 4, 2012, it was announced that Nordstrom would relocate to Del Amo Fashion Center, after nearly 30 years of service at the South Bay Galleria, as part of Del Amo's reconstruction project.

On August 24, 2015, the South Bay Galleria has announced that they will hold off on finding a replacement for its newly departed Nordstrom store, until the entire mall is renovated. The 2nd & 3rd floors of the former Nordstrom space currently serves as a Wonder of Dinosaurs exhibit. The 1st floor is currently a Department Store called Q.

On January 25, 2018, Australian investment firm QIC acquired South Bay Galleria from Cleveland-based Forest City. QIC planned to renovate the mall and add six acres of landscaped outdoor space opening directly onto a grand staircase entering into the mall along with standalone buildings and apartment buildings.

On November 14, 2019, Forever 21 announced it would be closing its South Bay Galleria location as the retailer closes 111 stores nationwide as part of its Chapter 11 bankruptcy. It closed in January 2020.

On July 31, 2025, Kennedy Wilson took over the property from foreclosure from the previous owners L Catterton. Plans to build mixed-use and affordable housing are considered.

== Transit access ==
The Mall is served by LACMTA Metro Local Lines: 40, 210, 211, & 344. It is also served by Torrance Transit Lines: 2, 8, 13, GTrans Line 3, Lawndale Beat, & Beach Cities Transit Line 102.

Most of these buses stop at the Redondo Beach Transit Center, which is located on Kingsdale Ave & 182nd St.

The mall will receive a station along the Metro K Line's extension to Torrance.

== In movies and television ==
The South Bay Galleria has been used as a backdrop for several movie and television productions, including Fat Albert.
