= Redondo Beach Transit Center =

Transport hub in Redondo Beach, California

General information
- Location: 1521 Kingsdale Av; Redondo Beach, California
- Coordinates: 33.8682°N 118.3567°W
- Operator: Beach Cities Transit
- Line: See Services section
- Platforms: 1 island platform
- Bus stands: 11

Construction
- Parking: 320 spaces
- Cycle facilities: Lockers
- Accessible: Yes

History
- Opened: November 6, 1987; 38 years ago
- Rebuilt: January 29, 2023; 3 years ago
- Former names: South Bay Galleria Transit Center
Location

The Redondo Beach Transit Center is a bus station in Redondo Beach, California. The station consists of one large island platform with 11 bus bays and a 320-space park and ride parking lot located next to the transit center. The transit center opened in early 2023, replacing a nearby bus terminal at the South Bay Galleria dating to 1987.

Bus services at the Redondo Beach Transit Center are operated by Beach Cities Transit, GTrans, Lawndale Beat, Los Angeles Metro Bus, and Torrance Transit.

== History ==
Plans for a new transit center dated back to early 2000. City Council and the Planning Commission approved the project's planning, design, and preliminary funding in 2009.

After a decade of inactivity on the project, groundbreaking and construction began in 2020. The transit center reopened on January 29, 2023, with Los Angeles Metro and GTrans being the first to serve the station. Torrance Transit began serving the station on January 30, 2023. Beach Cities Transit started serving the station on February 13, 2023. Lawndale Beat resumed service on May 15, 2023.

== Services ==
The Redondo Beach Transit Center serves 8 routes. Most services are to South Bay destinations, with additional service to Downtown Los Angeles and Hollywood.
