= STØR =

Defunct American furniture chain

STØR Furnishings International Inc. was an American furniture chain based in City of Industry, California, that opened in 1987. It sold European-style furniture and ready-to-assemble furnishings. Advertisements for the chain ended with the statement "STØR: without the 'E'". One such advertisement patterned after the "tastes great [vs.] less filling" Miller Lite slogan featured two such tradeoffs, "furniture [vs.] accessories" and "low prices [vs.] style".

IKEA filed a lawsuit against the company shortly after opening, claiming copyright infringement, and was settled in 1988 with STØR being forced to change the layout of their stores and advertising. STØR was acquired by IKEA in 1992.

A 1992 episode of The Simpsons called "Lisa the Beauty Queen" references STØR in a parody called "SHØP" which features a STØR-style building in IKEA's colors.
