= MainPlace Mall =

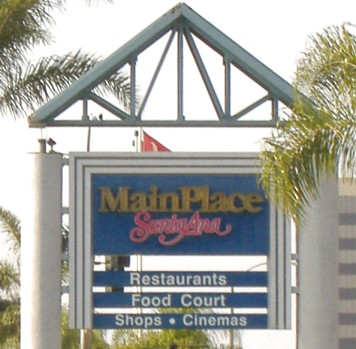
- The MainPlace Santa Ana entrance sign in November 2006
- Location: Santa Ana, California, United States
- Coordinates: 33.77523°N 117.86957°W
- Address: 2800 N. Main Street
- Opened: September 26, 1987; 39 years ago
- Developer: JMB-Federated Realty Associates
- Manager: Centennial Real Estate
- Owner: Centennial Real Estate Company; Montgomery Street Partners; USAA Real Estate Company; Unibail-Rodamco-Westfield (20%)
- Architect: Jon Jerde
- Num. of stores: 155 (as of 2018)
- Num. of anchor tenants: 7 (6 open, 1 vacant)
- Floor area: 1,109,800 sq ft (103,100 m^{2})
- Floors: 3
- Parking: 5,300
- Website: shopmainplacemall.com

MainPlace Mall (formerly known as Westfield MainPlace) is an enclosed shopping mall at the north edge of Santa Ana, California near Downtown Santa Ana, adjacent to the City of Orange and the Orange Crush interchange of the Santa Ana, Garden Grove and Orange freeways. The anchor stores are JCPenney, 24 Hour Fitness, Ashley HomeStore, Round 1 Entertainment, DXL Mens Apparel, and Macy's. There is 1 vacant anchor store that was once Nordstrom.

== History ==
=== Anchor stores, current and former ===
Current tenant	Former tenants/branding
Macy's	opened as Bullock's, original tenant of Fashion Square 1958, rebranded as Macy's
I. Magnin	original tenant of Fashion Square 1958, closed 1987, demolished
JCPenney	opened as May Co., 1991; rebranded as Robinsons-May Women's & Children's store, closed Sep. 2006; since March 2007 JCPenney
Vacant	OC Open Market Nordstrom: 169,000 square feet (15,700 m^{2}); original tenant of MainPlace 1987, closed 2017
24 Hour Fitness, Ashley HomeStore, Round One Entertainment	J.W. Robinson's: original tenant of MainPlace 1987, rebranded as Robinsons-May Men's and Home Store, rebranded as Macy's Men's and Home Store, closed 2012

=== Fashion Square ===
MainPlace Mall was built on the site of the much smaller open-air center that Los Angeles-based department store Bullock's opened in 1958, first called Bullock's Fashion Square. The center cost Bullock's $11.5 million to build and was designed by Pereira & Luckman. Bullock's Fashion Square debuted with 32 stores including branches of boutique department stores I. Magnin, Desmond's, Haggarty's and Mandel's, plus the Jolly Roger restaurant. There was parking for 3000 cars and opening day drew crowds of 40,000 people from across Orange County, according to the Los Angeles Times. As Bullock's opened similar Fashion Square malls in other Southern California cities, the venue was renamed Santa Ana Fashion Square.

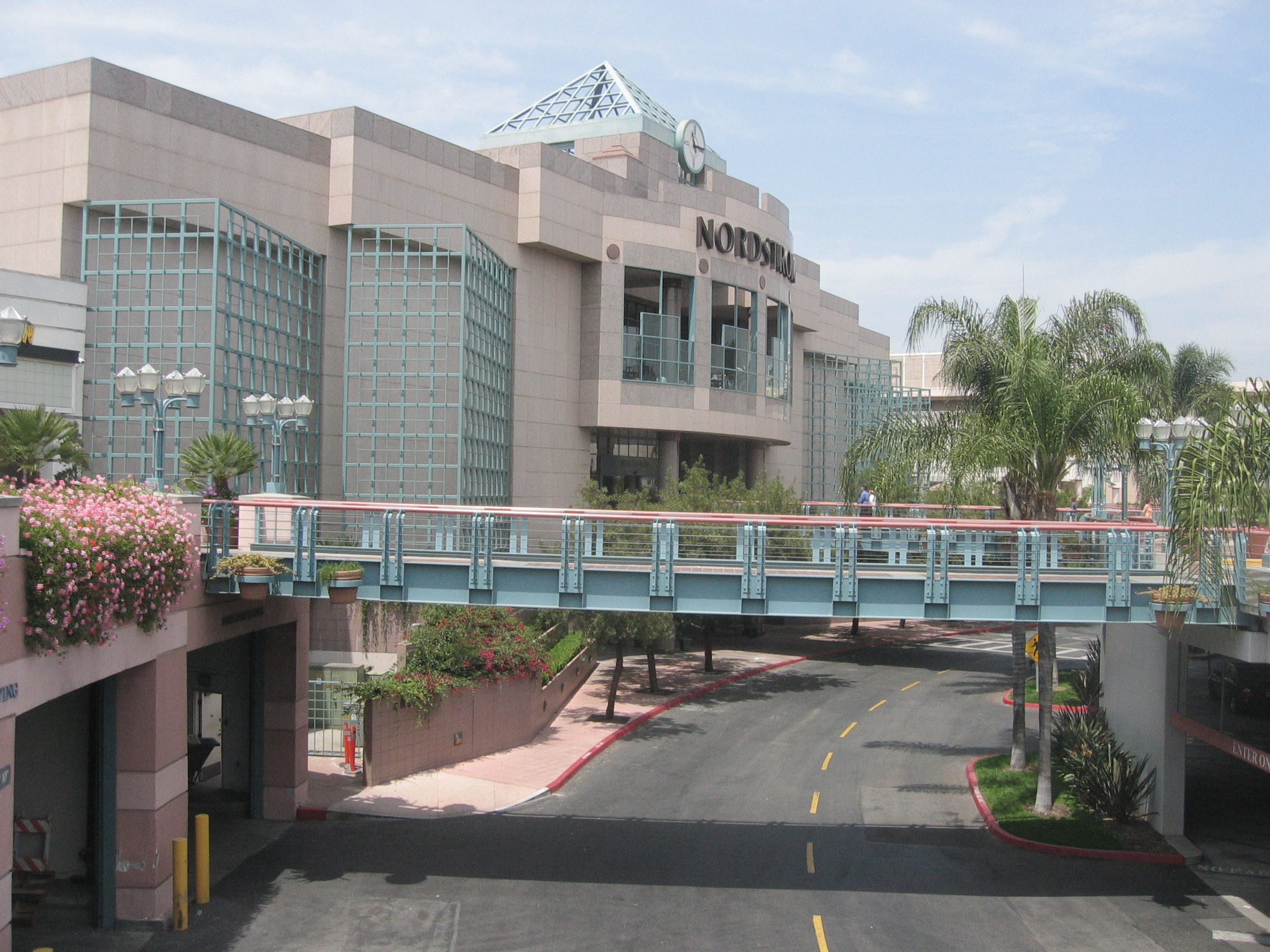
Mall exterior

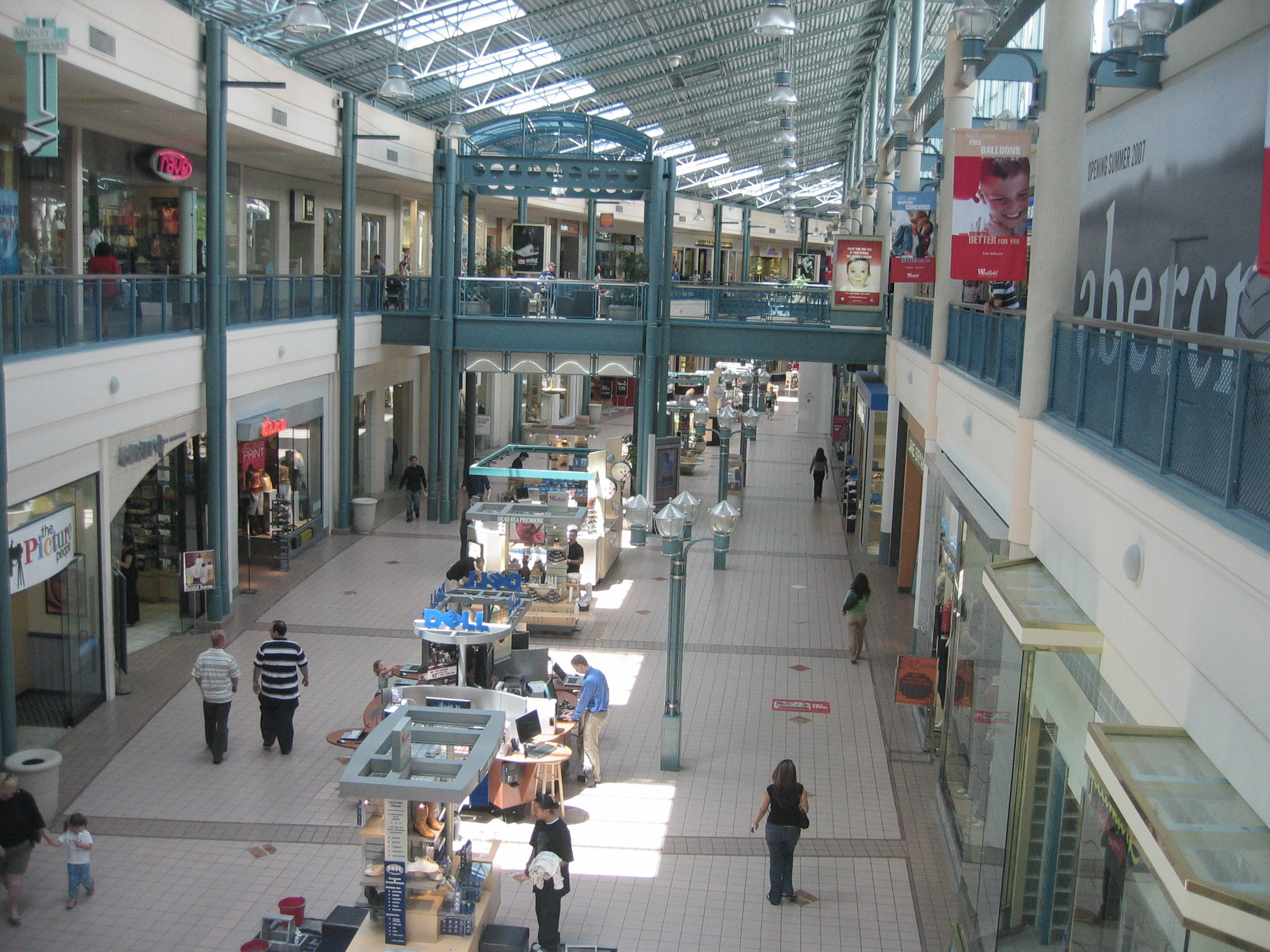
Mall interior

=== Transition to MainPlace ===
After a period of decline, JMB-Federated Realty Associates (the successor to Federated Stores Realty) demolished most of the shopping center, except for the anchors, and had it replaced by MainPlace in 1987. Bullock's chose to stay on while I. Magnin ultimately decided not to remain and therefore closed on February 14, 1987. Along with Bullock's, Nordstrom and J.W. Robinson's were the anchors when MainPlace first opened. In November 1990, a new wing opened with May Company California becoming the mall's fourth anchor store which opened in May 1991. By January 1993, Robinson's merged with May Company to become Robinsons-May and as a result, the original May Company store closed and reopened as the Robinsons-May Women's & Children's store while the original J.W. Robinson's store closed and reopened as the Robinsons-May Men's & Home store. The Bullock's became Macy's in May 1996.

In 2000, JMB Urban, the successor to JMB, sold MainPlace and other mall properties to the American branch of Rodamco. Rodamco, in turn, sold its North American properties to Westfield Group in 2002. Following the acquisition, the mall was renamed Westfield Shoppingtown MainPlace, and the "Shoppingtown" moniker was dropped in 2005.

By September 2006, the Robinsons-May Women and Children's store closed due to the chain being acquired by Macy's & Bloomingdale's in which the Robinsons-May Men's & Home store remained opened but became the Macy's Men's and Home store. In March 2007, JCPenney opened in the vacant Robinsons-May Women's & Children's store.

In 2006, Westfield Group sought to revamp the mall in the face of losing local retail market share to South Coast Plaza, California's largest and highest-volume mall, only 6.5 miles (10.5 km) to the south. In 2014, Westfield announced a $50 million renovation to the mall.

Macy's closed its Men's & Home Store at the mall in 2012, and consolidated those merchandise categories into the main store. The building, originally the J.W. Robinson's store, was split between 24 Hour Fitness, Ashley Furniture Home Store, and an entertainment center. In December 2015, Westfield sold the mall to a consortium that was headed by Centennial Real Estate Company and included Montgomery Street Partners and USAA Real Estate Company.

Nordstrom, an original anchor when MainPlace opened in September 1987, closed in 2017.

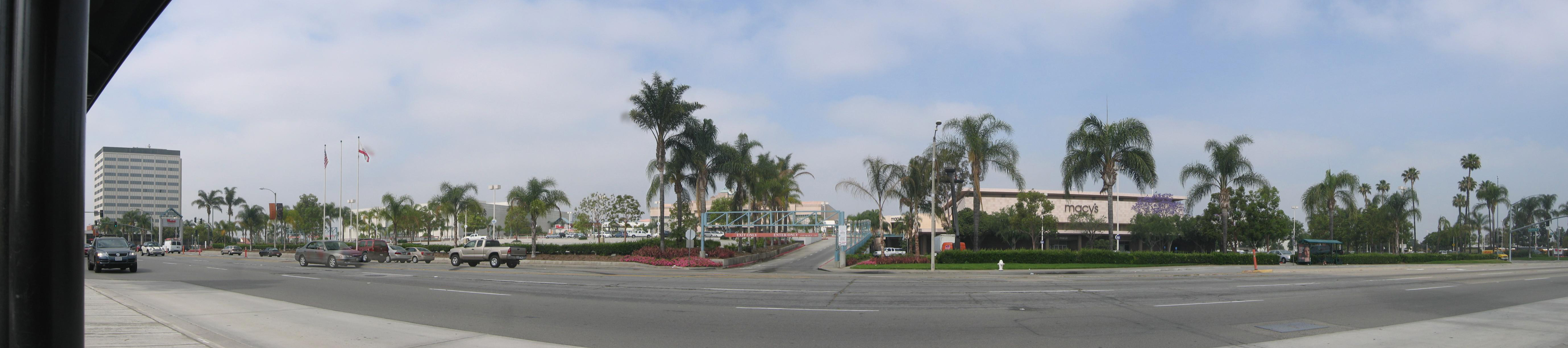
Panoramic view of MainPlace Mall

== Plans for transformation ==
By 2019, MainPlace Mall had seen 35 store closures and a $54 million drop in gross sales over a two-year period. In March 2019, it was announced that a US$300,000,000 project would transform the mall into an outdoor center by removing its central portion, adding a food hall in "European marketplace" style, an interactive play center for children, upgrades to its movie theater, a grocery store, and two apartment communities with 700 new residential units. Together with new residential communities adjacent to the mall, there would be a total of 3,000 new residential units in the immediate area. As of 2024, a FYE store has been announced to open.
