= Del Amo Fashion Center =

Shopping mall in Southern California

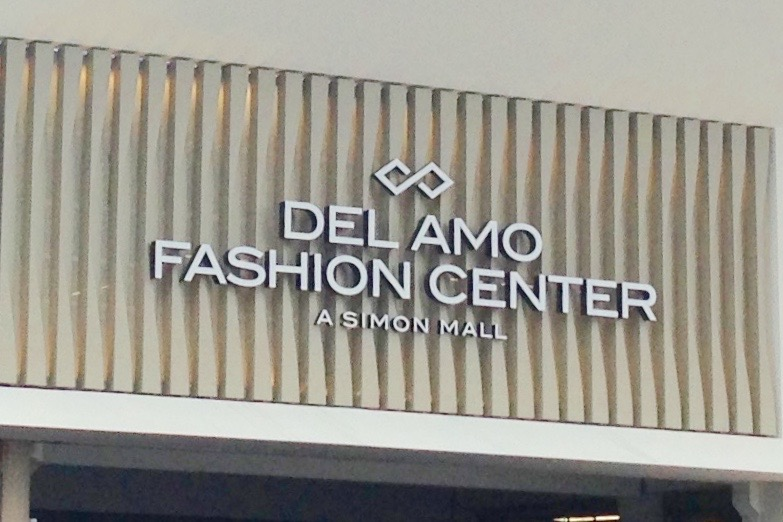
- Sign over Carson Street
- Location: Torrance, California, United States
- Coordinates: 33.828072°N 118.349796°W
- Opened: March 16, 1961; 62 years ago
- Developer: Guilford Glazer
- Manager: Simon Property Group
- Owner: JPMorgan Chase (25%), Simon Property Group (50%), & Farallon Cap. Mgt. (25%)
- Num. of stores: 255 (as of 2026)
- Num. of anchor tenants: 9 (8 open, 1 vacant)
- Floor area: 2,519,601 sq ft (234,079 m^{2})
- Floors: 3 (2 in Dick's Sporting Goods, and Nordstrom, and former Sears, 4 in Macy's North)
- Parking: 12,000
- Website: www.simon.com/mall/del-amo-fashion-center

Del Amo Fashion Center is a three-level regional shopping mall in Torrance, California, United States. It is managed and co-owned by Simon Property Group.

With a gross leasable area (GLA) of 2,519,601 sq ft (234,079 m^{2}), it is the seventh largest shopping mall in the United States. The mall features Mitsuwa Marketplace, Nordstrom, Dick's Sporting Goods, JCPenney, Macy's Men's and Home Store, and Macy's Women's Store.

== History ==
Del Amo Fashion Center has evolved from an amalgamation of several developments on the eastern side of the intersection of Hawthorne Boulevard and Carson Street in Torrance, California by Guilford Glazer (#384 on Forbes Richest 400). From 1981 to 1992 it was the largest shopping mall in the United States, reaching 3,000,000 square feet (280,000 square meters) in size at its largest. It was eclipsed as the largest by the opening of Mall of America on August 11, 1992.

=== South side: Broadway/Del Amo Shopping Center ===
On February 16, 1959, The Broadway opened its store at Hawthorne and Sepulveda boulevards, the ninth in Greater Los Angeles. Over the next two years the open-air Del Amo Shopping Center was built adjacent to it, south of Carson Street. Silverwoods opened what was also its ninth L.A.-area store here in November 1960. Most of the rest of the center opened in stages in early 1961 with additional anchors JCPenney, Sears and Woolworth's. Other stores that opened in 1961 were Lerner's, Leed's Shoes and Ontra Cafeteria; and later C. H. Baker Shoes, Judy's Sportwear, Helen Morgan Women's Shop, The Men's Shop, Tot's Toggery and Suburban Shop, Singer Sewing Shop, Mandel's Shoes, Varon's Jewelry, and Children's Shoe Store.

=== North side: Bullock's/Del Amo Fashion Square ===
In 1966, Bullock's opened at a small open-air shopping center it had developed north of Carson Street called Bullock's Fashion Square — advertising and editorial in the first years referred to "Bullock's Fashion Square in Torrance", not Del Amo. Bullock's developed several similarly named Fashion Squares, including ones in Sherman Oaks, La Habra and Santa Ana. I. Magnin, owned by Bullock's, opened a store on March 6, 1967.

Desmond's was actually the first anchor to open at Fashion Square in 1966.

In February 1970, Federated Department Stores replaced its Bullock's Realty Corporation, which owned and managed the Fashion Squares, with an organization called Transwest Management; Transwest sold the Torrance Fashion Square in March of that year to new co-owners Great Lakes and Guilford Glazer and Associates, while selling the three other Fashion Squares to Urban Investment and Development Company (UIDC).

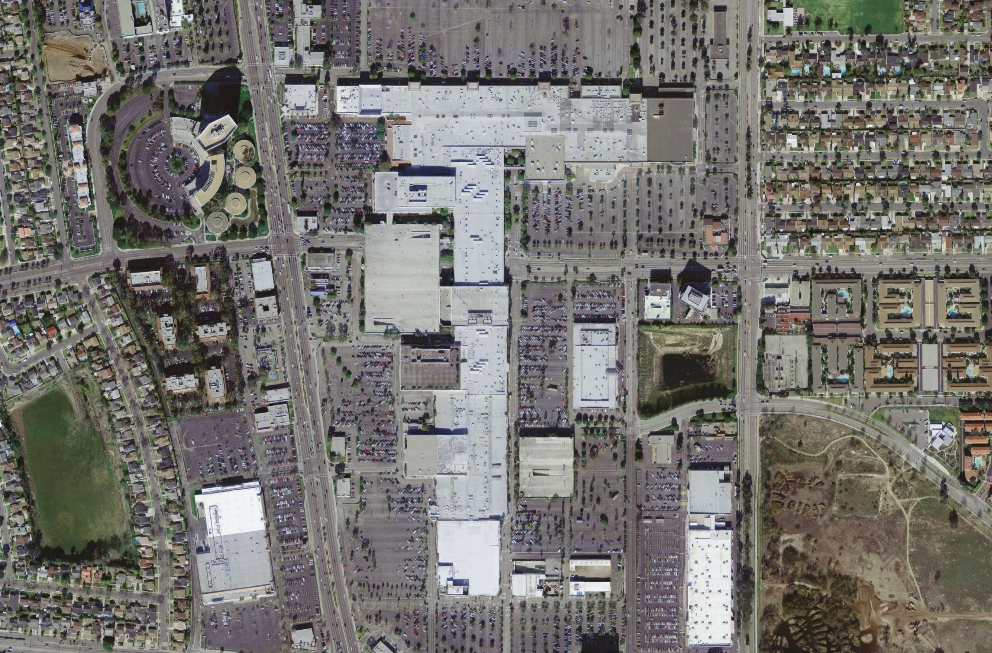
Overview after the merger of the Del Amo Fashion Square (north) and the Del Amo Center (south). Photo taken between 2004 and 2005.

In 1971, the center was rebaptized Del Amo Fashion Square and added a $3.75 million, 177,000-square-foot (16,400 m^{2}) Montgomery Ward, a 90,000-square-foot (8,400 m^{2}) Ohrbach's and an expanded I. Magnin, as well as a United Artists fourplex theater which later received 2 additional larger auditoriums, and a Woolworth's, both of which were in the Montgomery Ward wing. Glazer acquired neighboring Del Amo Center in 1978.

=== "Marriage of the malls" ===
In November 1981, the two formerly separate centers were officially merged in the "marriage of the malls" to form the Del Amo Fashion Center, with the opening of a concourse over Carson Street that linked the Del Amo Fashion Square to a new J. W. Robinson's built at the northern end of the Del Amo Center. The existing infrastructure was also renovated at this time and included a food court (the International Food Court) and a then-state-of-the-art computerized help system. Del Amo became the largest indoor shopping center in the world.

The center continued to evolve over the years as Ohrbach's closed in 1987 and became Swedish style furniture retailer STØR. In 1991, the United Artists theater closed when a 9-screen Mann theater opened outside of the mall on Del Amo Circle to the east of J. W. Robinson's. When STØR went out of business in the early 1990s, the property was used as a clearance center for STØR merchandise before being subdivided into Marshalls and TJ Maxx in the late 1990s. I. Magnin followed in 1989 with part of their store eventually occupied by Old Navy, while Burlington Coat Factory opened in the basement of the former Del Amo Center. J. W. Robinson's became Robinsons-May in January 1993, following the merger with May Department Stores.

In 1996, following the merger of Bullocks and The Broadway into Macy's West, the former Bullock's became Macy's Apparel store, while the Macy's south store (where the Broadway resided) was closed. At first, the company attempted to sell the building to Bloomingdale's, but after three years reopened it in July 1999 as a Macy's home and furniture gallery, its largest stand-alone home furnishing store in Southern California. The 50,000-square-foot (4,600-square-meter) ground floor became a Jo-Ann's fabric and crafts store. In April 1998, Woolworth's became Venator.

Faced with a change in consumer shopping patterns, the consolidation of the department store industry, the existence of too many malls fragmenting the greater Los Angeles retail marketplace, lack of highway access, and competition from the neighboring Nordstrom-anchored South Bay Galleria (formerly the open-air South Bay Shopping Center from 1959 to 1985) that opened in 1985, Del Amo began to suffer. In 2000, the Mann theater closed in accordance with the chain's folding and became LA Fitness. Two anchors on the property's northern side - Montgomery Ward and Woolworth's - closed due to bankruptcy and left the mall's north wing without an anchor.

=== Mills renovation ===
In early 2002, The Mills Corporation acquired Del Amo Fashion Center from Glazer's family for $442 million. Subsequently, Mills sold a half-interest in the property to institutional investor funds managed by JPMorgan Fleming, before, in December 2004, initiating a $160 million redevelopment including demolition and redevelopment of the former northeastern wing where Montgomery Ward and Woolworth's had been located, the renovation of 670,000 square feet (62,000 square meters) of existing space and the addition of another 100,000 square feet (9,300 square meters). Robinsons-May converted to a second full-line Macy's West on September 9, 2006, called Macy's South, while Macy's Apparel was renamed Macy's North.

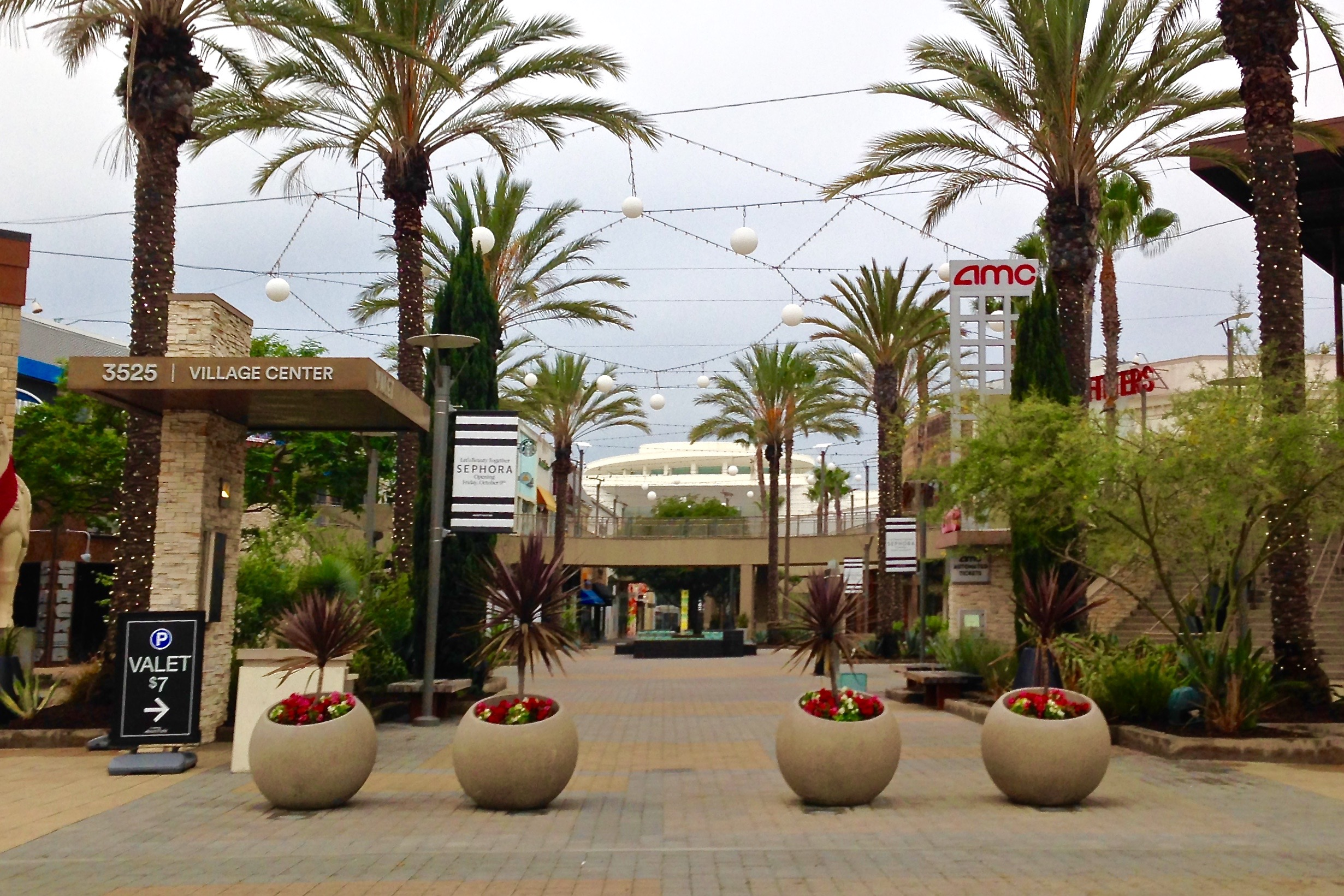
Lifestyle Court

The new open-air lifestyle center opened on September 14, 2006, anchored by a two-story flagship Forever 21), a Lucky Strike Lanes, and an AMC Theatres 18-screen multiplex to the mall. A Crate & Barrel home furnishings store opened adjacent to the mall in 2007.

In April 2007, The Mills Corporation was jointly acquired by Simon Property Group and Farallon Capital Management. Both assumed ownership and management of Del Amo Fashion Center.

=== Simon expansion ===
After increasing its ownership stake in the property, Simon presented preliminary plans to revamp Del Amo. The plans were considered vague and underwhelming by Torrance residents.

In late 2012, detailed plans to redevelop Del Amo on a much larger scale were unveiled. These latest design efforts were led by Hollywood-based architecture firm 5+design. The mall's north end would be demolished entirely, replaced by a new two-level Californian coastal-designed wing of luxury shops, expanding this mall into one of the largest malls in Southern California and back to the top 10 largest malls in the United States with the intention to stop the leaking of and to gain market share from the more affluent shopping centers in West LA (namely Westfield Century City and Third Street Promenade) and Orange County (namely the Irvine Spectrum, Fashion Island, and South Coast Plaza). In conjunction with the renovation, Nordstrom announced it would relocate its store from the South Bay Galleria in nearby Redondo Beach to Del Amo, anchoring the new wing. This much grander plan was meant to finally re-establish this property as the premier shopping center of the South Bay region of Los Angeles and revitalize this long-neglected, massive mall into one cohesive property with one distinct architectural style.

The first phase of the project, redeveloping the wing of shops above Carson Street into a new food court, renamed "Patio Cafes", began in 2013. Work was completed in the spring of the following year, as retailers began vacating the north wing to make way for the renovation.

Plans to consolidate the mall's three Macy's stores into two were confirmed in 2014, with Macy's consolidating its standalone Macy's Home store into the existing Macy's Men's store. Simon then traded ownership of the Macy's Men's building for the Macy's Home building. Dick's Sporting Goods moved into the former Macy's Home space in early 2017. Meanwhile, the Jo-Ann Fabrics store on the ground floor of said began renovation in early 2019 and completed in mid 2020.

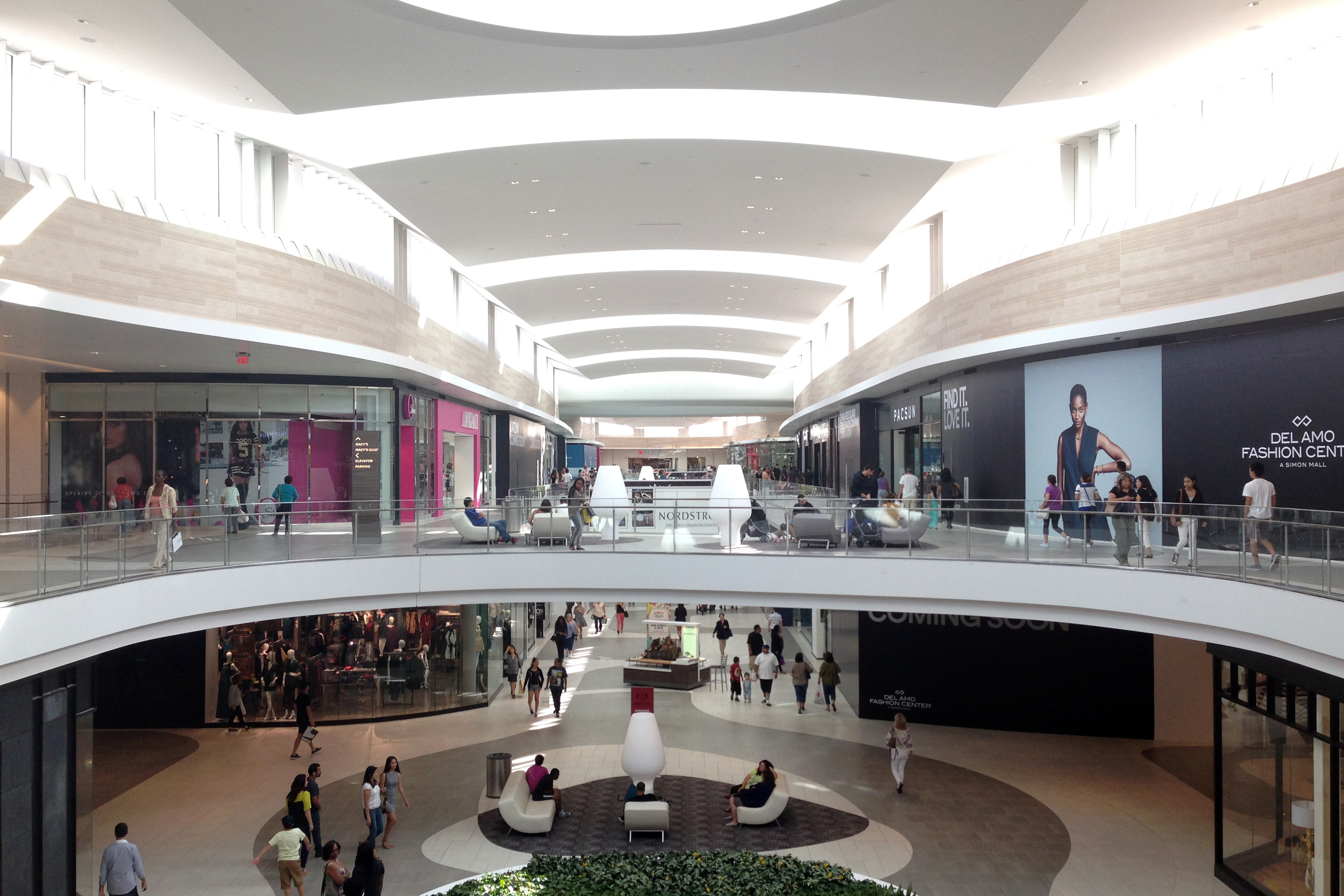
Interior of the Fashion Wing at the Del Amo Fashion Center, looking south from Nordstrom

After 18 months of construction, the northern portion of the mall officially opened on October 9, 2015. A medical building on the north end of the property and the existing one-story northern section were replaced with a two-story Fashion Wing, featuring a brighter and open "beach elegance" aesthetic to bring in more natural light and a mid-century modern look. Several new and relocated restaurants fronted the new wing: a relocated Lucille's Smokehouse Bar-B-Que, and now-closed locations for Brio Tuscan Grille and locally owned restaurants EMC Seafood & Raw Bar and Great Maple.

The south end of the property experienced minor renovations in line with the more elaborate north end changes, including signs delineating the wing "Del Amo Shopping Center" with a focus on general-purpose retail. In 2018, renovation plans were completed to replace a significant portion of the south end's inline retail space with Dave & Buster's and a relocated Marshalls store. Outback Steakhouse, which was displaced by construction on the south end, reopened in the Outdoor Village on July 7, 2018.

In November 2019, the former Orbach's building, which previously housed Marshalls on the first floor and TJ Maxx on the second floor, became a Mitsuwa Marketplace supermarket. The second floor remains vacant after TJ Maxx left Del Amo in Spring 2016. The following year, the property's Sears store closed and its real estate purchased by mall owner Simon for future use.

On July 1, 2020, Sears announced it was shutting down as part of an ongoing decision to eliminate its traditional brick-and-mortar format. The 22.4-acre (9.1 ha) Sears property (which includes the Original Sears Building, the branded auto shops, adjacent office building, and the surrounding parking lot) is set to be bought by Simon Property Group by ~$110 million. Meanwhile, Fasha Mahjoor, who, in May 2014, bought the 16-acre (6.5 ha) property that SunCal once owned, intends to build housing near Del Amo Mall. The property includes the standalone Black Angus Steakhouse restaurant, the former Montgomery Ward department store (now parking for Del Amo), and the abandoned Wards auto shop. However, Mahjoor announced that said project will not be "high-density housing at the mall", calling it a "political no-go". In January 2022, a Sweetgreen was announced slated replace the former Great Maple, which closed down in 2017.

On March 1, 2024, the mall started a new chaperone policy after recent months of incidents at that mall, requiring all visitors under 18 must be accompanied by a parent or adult, age 21 or older, after 3 PM on Fridays and Saturdays. On September 20, 2024, a new Apple Store opened at the mall followed by the release of the iPhone 16 and iPhone 16 Pro models. The new store was taken over by the combined space of two side-by-side units formerly occupied by J.Crew and Chico's, located on the main level in the Nordstrom wing. On February 25, 2025, Jo-Ann Fabrics announced it was closing as part of a plan to shut down all stores nationwide after filing for bankruptcy. Jo-Ann has since closed. On July 11, 2025, the Black Angus Steakhouse on the outparcel near the Lifestyle Wing closed after 50 years at Del Amo Mall. While they are looking to reopen closer to their former Torrance location, the lot (which also has mall parking and the former Wards auto shop) was demolished for a long-awaited housing project near the mall.

== See also ==
- List of largest shopping malls in the world
- List of largest shopping malls in the United States
