= Mandel's =

Shoe store chain

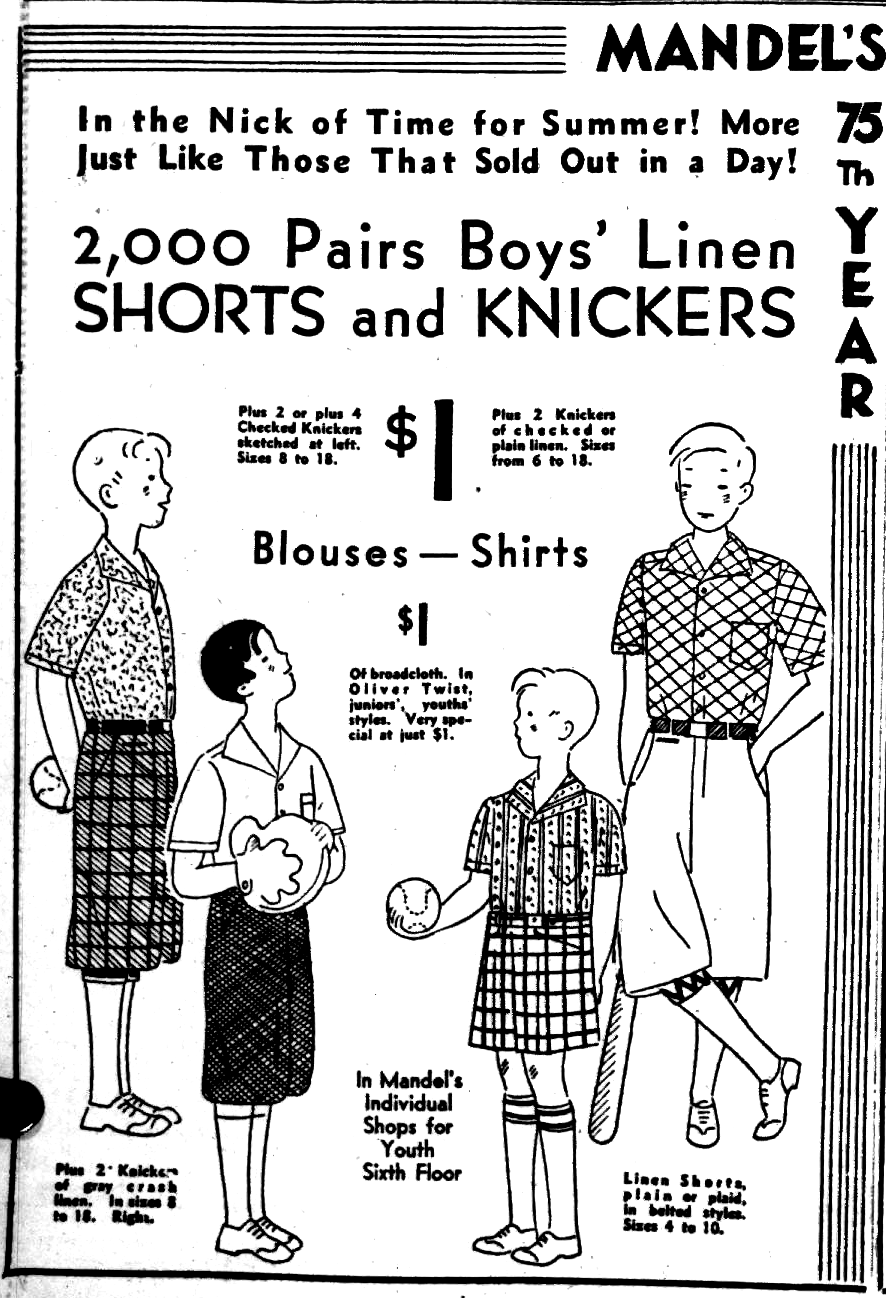
1930 advert

Mandel's (a.k.a. Mandel's Shoe Stores and Mandel's Fascinating Slippers) was a chain of shoe stores in the Southwestern United States for many decades of the 20th century. For a time it advertised its wares as "Mandel's Fascinating Slippers". Maurice Mandel headed up the stores through the 1930s, 1940s and 1950s. Later Mandel would later serve as General Merchandise Manager (GMM) of chain Mullen & Bluett and president of Harris & Frank. Among its branches were:

in Central Los Angeles:

- Downtown Los Angeles, flagship store at 518 West Seventh Street, opened March 1936, claimed to be the largest shoe store in the Western United States
- Beverly Hills, 9670 Wilshire Boulevard, opened 1954
- Hollywood - 2 Hollywood Boulevard locations
- Miracle Mile - 5480 Wilshire Boulevard, closed in 1970s. One of the earliest commercial structures in the Miracle Mile, built in 1927–9 in Spanish Colonial Revival style and remodeled in 1949 by Eugene Burke and Charles M. Kober in "ultra-modern California style featuring soft color contrasts".

in the rest of Greater Los Angeles:

- Glendale - 327 North Brand Avenue, opened 1953
- Lakewood Center, Lakewood, remodeled 1962
- Long Beach - Third Street and Pine Avenue
- Pasadena - 246 South Lake Street, opened 1957, 4,000 square feet (370 m^{2}), cost $160,000, at that time the 10th store in the chain
- Santa Ana 406 North Main Street

Elsewhere:

- El Paso, Texas - 208 North Mesa Street (SH 20)
- Phoenix

In 1957, a California Appellate Court rules that Mandel's could not refuse to sell merchandise to Africa Americans, as a retail store was a "place of public accommodation", overruling a previous decision that stores were not covered by state anti-Jim Crow laws.
