= Westfield Fashion Square =

Coordinates: 34.156908°N 118.437726°W

- The Westfield Group
- Location: Sherman Oaks, Los Angeles, California
- Address: 14006 Riverside Drive, Sherman Oaks, CA 91423
- Opened: 1962
- Developer: Bullock's
- Manager: Unibail-Rodamco-Westfield
- Owner: Unibail-Rodamco-Westfield
- Architect: Burke, Kober, and Nikolai
- Num. of stores: 140
- Num. of anchor tenants: 2
- Floor area: 850,000 sq ft (79,000 m^{2})
- Floors: 2, 3 in Bloomingdales, 4 in Macys
- Website: www.westfield.com/united-states/fashionsquare

Westfield Fashion Square is a shopping mall in the Sherman Oaks area of Los Angeles, California. It is owned by Unibail-Rodamco-Westfield. The mall features the traditional retailers Bloomingdale's and Macy's.

== History ==
The mall opened on April 22, 1962, as Bullock's Fashion Square, anchored by Bullock's and I. Magnin department stores. It was officially dedicated on August 13, 1962. Later known as Fashion Square Sherman Oaks, the mall added a Joseph Magnin store in 1966 and The Broadway department store in 1977.

From 1988 to 1990, the outdoor mall was enclosed and double-decked with a Mediterranean theme.

In 1994, the mall suffered serious damage from the Northridge earthquake.

In 1996, Bullock's was converted into Macy's and The Broadway became Bloomingdale's—the result of Federated Department Stores buying out Carter Hawley Hale Stores, the Broadway's parent company.

The Westfield Group acquired a half-interest in the shopping center in 2002 and renamed it Westfield Shoppingtown Fashion Square in 2003. Westfield dropped the "Shoppingtown" name in June 2005, becoming Westfield Fashion Square.

Westfield Fashion Square underwent another major renovation in 2013, creating a more cosmopolitan look and an upgraded food court.

The mall was evaluated by the Los Angeles Metro as a potential site for a maintenance and storage facility for the Sepulveda Transit Corridor Project, which was met with intense community outrage and concerns over losing the mall.

== In media ==
Westfield Fashion Square has been featured in many television and film productions, including Malcolm in the Middle, The Office, Clueless, and The Ellen DeGeneres Show.

== See also ==
- Westfield Group
