= Junior department store =

Type of department store

A junior department store in North America is a type of retailer that experienced growth from the late 1930s through the 1960s, but is no longer common today, as retail moved increasingly towards discount stores like Walmart and Target, and big box off-price stores like Ross Dress For Less, Marshalls and TJ Maxx.

Several types of stores were identified as junior department stores, all of which had in common merchandise organized into departments and store sizes ranging from 30,000 to 100,000 square feet (2,800 to 9,300 m^{2}) (according to author James Cooper) but sometimes smaller, especially in the case of large variety stores that promoted themselves as junior department stores. The types of stores called junior department stores included:

- Larger format variety stores, also known as dime stores or 5 and 10 cent stores. Especially W. T. Grant and TG&Y promoted its locations as "junior department stores", but also at times J. J. Newberry and even Thrifty Drug Stores, which originated as a drug store that started selling general merchandise, did so in Southern California.
- Traditional department store with merchandise organized into departments and which was normally sold for "full price", i.e. there was not the implication of its being a discount store or prices being permanently lower than full-price stores. They were "junior" in the sense of being either 1) of a smaller size, often stated as less than 100,000 square feet (9,300 m^{2}), and/or 2) as having fewer lines of merchandise, or departments, than a regular (larger) department store, particularly hard goods such as major appliances, which North American department stores generally carried during that era. Examples of stores that fulfilled the criteria of being divided into departments and in the size range are:
  - Chains like the Boston Stores (California)
  - Smaller, local department stores with no branches or only one or two, such as Hinshaw's, Iver's, Robertson's and Rathbun's in the Los Angeles area or Bon Marché in Lowell, Massachusetts
  - Small-format upscale department stores such as Buffums which might be called specialty department stores. Hong Kong's Lane Crawford and UK's Harvey Nichols are also considered as specialty department store, as it focuses on selling luxury goods.
  - Larger clothing stores with no home furnishings or hard goods at all, but which were large enough to be considered small department stores. Examples in Southern California were Silverwoods and Harris & Frank.

Fast fashion brands such as Zara, H&M and Primark are often confused with the specification, as they not only sold clothing but also home goods and cosmetics under their own brand.
