= Robertson's (disambiguation) =

Robertson's May mean

- Robertson's, a British jam and marmalade company
- Robertson Company also known as Robertson’s department store, Hollywood, California, United States
- Robertson’s department store, South Bend, Indiana, United States
- Robertson's Hams, American food company
