= John Price Hayter =

American serial killer (1933–1995)

- Born: John Price Hayter Jr. September 28, 1933; Waco, Texas, U.S.
- Died: February 21, 1995 (aged 61); Jacksonville, Florida, U.S.
- Convictions: Texas: Murder x2 Burglary; Auto theft Florida: Murder; Burglary; Robbery
- Penalty: Texas: Life imprisonment x2 (murders); 2 years (auto theft); Florida: Life imprisonment

Details
- Victims: 3
- Span of crimes: 1953–1986
- Country: United States
- States: Texas, Florida
- Date apprehended: For the final time in September 1986

John Price Hayter Jr. (September 28, 1933 – February 21, 1995) was an American serial killer. A lifelong criminal, he was convicted of killing a fellow prisoner and two women on three occasions from 1953 to 1986 in Texas and Florida. Sentenced to multiple life terms, he died while behind bars for his Florida convictions.

== Murders ==
=== Leroy Martin ===
On November 29, 1952, the 19-year-old Hayter stole a 1951 Packard 200 from a man named O. F. Jones in Austin, Texas, which he then drove to a parking lot in his native Waco. He was swiftly arrested for this crime, and when brought to trial, he pleaded guilty to automobile theft and was sentenced to two years imprisonment.

He was then transported to the Ramsey Unit in Brazoria County, where he was supposed to serve out his sentence. On August 18, 1953, more than seven months after his arrival, Hayter was bailing hay with 18-year-old fellow convict Leroy Oscar Martin when the pair supposedly got into an argument with one another. In the process, Hayter stabbed Martin with his pitchfork, killing him on the spot. Little information was released about the killing and the motive behind it, but Hayter was convicted and sentenced to a life term with the possibility of parole.

=== Linda Pibil ===
Hayter served 21 years of his life sentence when he was granted parole by the Board of Pardons and Paroles in Austin. He returned to Waco and found work at a machine shop, but exactly two weeks later, he attempted a hold-up of a Robertson's Hams store in Abbott. Hayter then kidnapped the cashier, 17-year-old Linda Ruth Pibil, drove to a rural area, and raped her before shooting her to death. Pibil's body was later found abandoned near Fort Hood by two soldiers.

Approximately a month later, Hayter, pretending to be an electrician, went to the house of a woman in Lacy Lakeview and asked to check out a supposed power failure. While pretending to examine the TV and other electrical equipment, he pulled out a switchblade on the woman's baby, threatening to cut its throat if she did not do what he said. He then instructed the woman to get into her car with him, and then drive around several residential areas until he could find a good spot. However, the victim's grandmother realized what was going on and notified the authorities, who managed to track down the car and give chase. During the chase, the victim managed to jump out of the car, leaving it to crash into one of the police officers' cars. Hayter, who was still inside, survived the crash and was immediately arrested. Not long after, he was charged with the abduction of the Lacy Lakeview victim and the murder of Pibil, as he had been identified as the girl's abductor by several witnesses. For both of these crimes, he was convicted and again sentenced to life imprisonment.

=== Teena Ambrose ===
Circa June 1986, Hayter was paroled yet again, but this time did not stay in Texas and started drifting around the country, supplying his income via thefts and burglaries. On September 15, he broke into an apartment in Lakeland, Florida, tying up, sexually assaulting, and then strangling 80-year-old Teena Ambrose, who lived there by herself, using a rain bonnet's plastic tie. He then stole her 1966 Plymouth Fury and fled the area, driving to Delray Beach before abandoning the vehicle. From there, he went to the home of an elderly couple, threatened them at gunpoint, and bound them before stealing their 1986 Mercury Marquis. With this car, Hayter drove towards Grants, New Mexico, where he was arrested by local authorities for the auto theft. During an interview with a local detective, he voluntarily confessed to the Florida crimes, and was positively identified as a suspect by a distinctive tattoo on his forearm depicting an outline of his home state with the words 'Texas' inside'.

== Arrest, trial, and death ==
Hayter's trial was scheduled to take place at Courtroom 1 in Bartow, which at the time was considered a historic courtroom noted for its emotionally charged trials and poor acoustics. Coincidentally, it was also scheduled to be the last murder trial to be set there before its planned renovation by the Polk County Commission.

When the trial began, prosecutors procured a tape containing a conversation between Hayter and Polk County Det. Larry Ashley. In it, Hayter explained that he was driving along the I-4 when he noticed Ambrose's house, opting to rob it because there was nobody inside. After stealing some jewelry from her bedroom, he began searching for more valuables in the living room when he saw Ambrose parking in her driveway. When she entered, he claimed that he accosted her and moved to the bedroom, where he planned to tie her up and steal her personal items, but she resisted fiercely and he resorted to slapping her. Hayter claimed that he left her behind without killing Ambrose, assuming that she had choked to death on the gags, before fleeing the area altogether.

Those claims were disputed by Dr. James Holimon, a forensic medical examiner who concluded that the restraints placed on Ambrose were so tight that they broke her larynx, rendering her unable to breathe. This, coupled with the fact that plastic ligatures and a gag had been placed in her mouth, indicated that they were done in a deliberate and premeditated manner with the intention of killing the victim. Prosecutors also indicated that, if the need ever arose, they would bring forward witness testimony from the elderly couple from Delray Beach, who were certain they could identify their assailant if they saw his distinctive tattoo.

In the end, Hayter was found guilty of Ambrose's murder, which, in addition to the aggravating charges of burglary and robbery, would have made him eligible for the death penalty. He remained emotionless while the guilty verdict was read out, preferring to pay attention on chewing cough drops. Contrary to the family's wishes, he was given another life sentence and remained behind bars until his death on February 21, 1995.

== See also ==
- List of serial killers in the United States
