= Buffums =

Defunct American department store chain

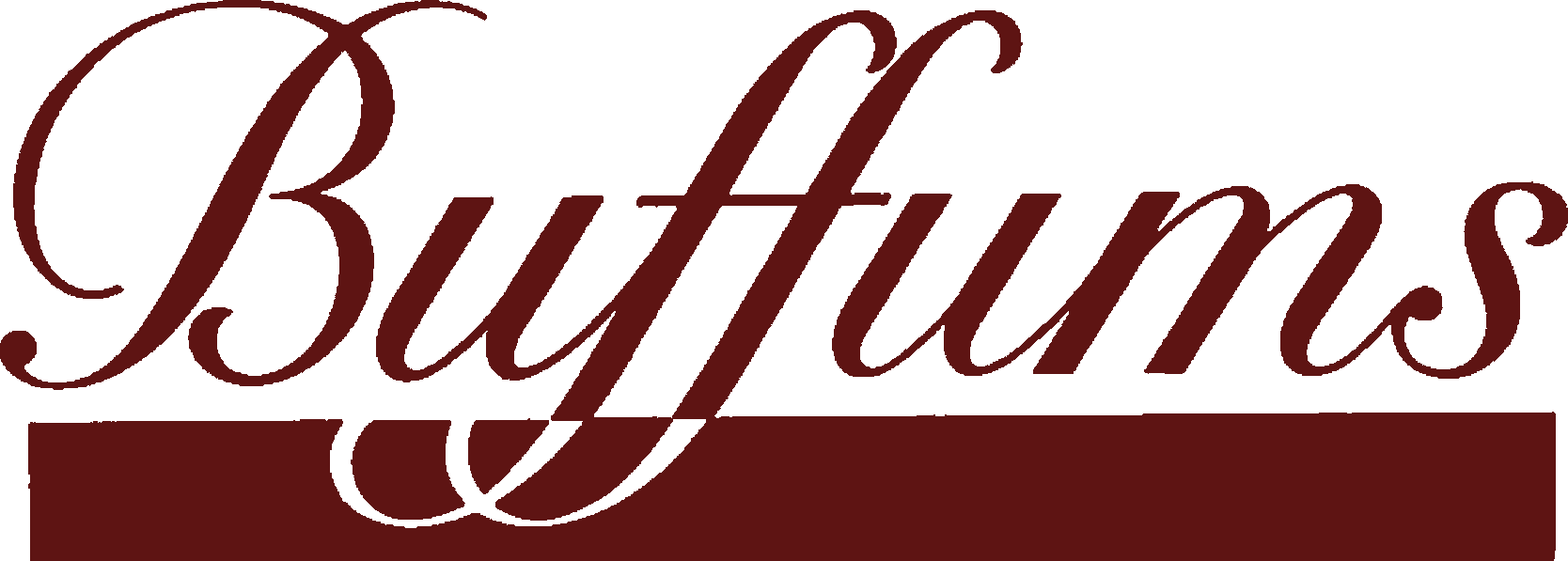
Buffums final logo

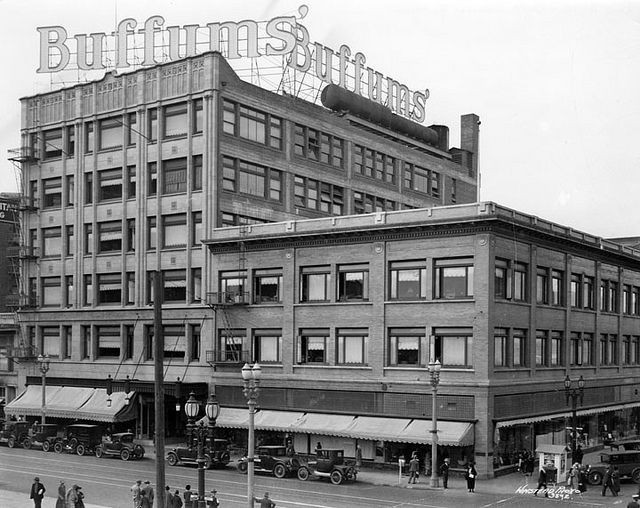
Buffums newly expanded store, 1924

Buffums, originally written as Buffums' with an apostrophe, was a chain of upscale department stores, headquartered in Long Beach, California. The Buffums chain began in 1904, when two brothers from Illinois, Charles and Edwin Buffum, together with other partners, bought the Schilling Bros., the largest dry goods store in Long Beach, and renamed it The Mercantile Co. The store grew to a large downtown department store, and starting in the 1950s, grew slowly over the years to be a small regional chain of 16 speciality department stores across Southern California at the time of its closure in 1990.

Over the years, the stores gained a reputation as the "Grand Dame" of department stores in the area. The stores' interiors were known for large chandeliers and other upscale touches. The chain marketed itself as "Buffums Specialty Store," in an attempt to differentiate itself from other local chains, including The Broadway and Bullock's, and the national stores such as May Co. and Robinson's. Its most famous advertising line, "I've been to Buffums," was used in newspaper and television advertisements during the 1970s and '80s. It was also known for its "Bag-A-Bargain" promotion that placed actual shopping bags (printed with a discount offer) in local newspapers.

Like other local department stores of the era, Buffums was challenged by old-fashioned business models, changing consumer tastes, and the arrival of Seattle-based retailer Nordstrom. The chain was bought in the 1970s by the Australian-based David Jones, which looked to sell the struggling chain in the 1980s. By the time of the sale it had become part of Adelaide Steamship Company, an Australian conglomerate, who never found a buyer. In a last-ditch effort to modernize, Buffums installed new IBM point-of-sale registers in all stores in 1990 (to complement their data center's newly purchased IBM AS/400, IBM's then-new midrange computer), only to enter liquidation following the 1990 Christmas shopping season.

== Stores ==
=== Flagship ===
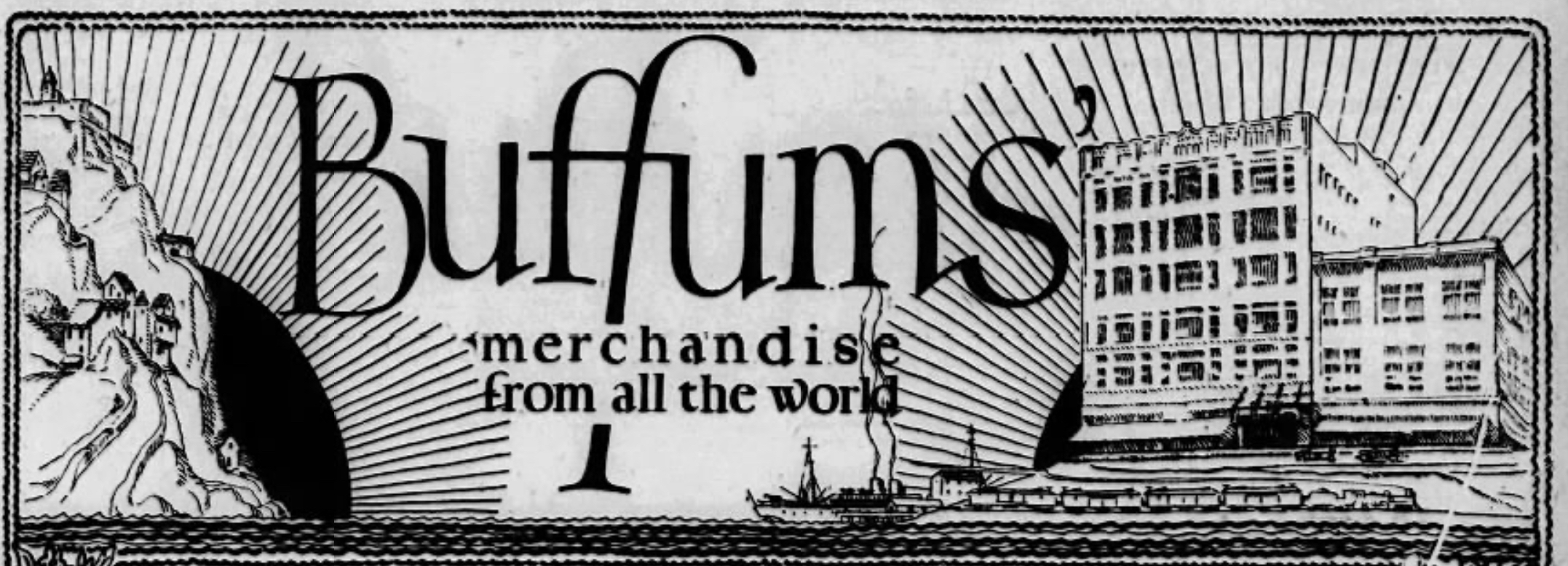
Buffums' logo and sketch of newly expanded store, 1924

Buffums' Downtown flagship grew as follows:

The predecessor of Buffums, Wm. Schilling & Sons dry goods store opened in 1892 at the corner of 2nd and Pine in Long Beach. By 1902 they were located at the Stafford Block, 127–129 Pine Avenue, and described as a "commodious", 6,250 sq ft (581 m^{2}) "department store", "embracing a complete line of dress goods ladies and gents furnishings, clothing, shoes, hats and caps, blankets, comforts, etc".. That same year the father William retired and the firm became Schilling Bros.

In 1904, a partnership bought the Schilling Bros. business for $65,000 (~$1.77 million in 2024); the partners were Charles and Edwin Buffum arrived from Illinois, and local businessmen S. Townsend, W. L. Porterneld and C. J. Walter. The company started operating as The Mercantile Co. The 127–129 Pine Avenue Schilling Bros. store, several doors south of Broadway, would eventually become the men's shoe store of the future Buffums flagship store. The next year, the Mercantile Co. announced the purchase of a lot on the southwest corner of Pine and Broadway, 74.5 ft. by 150 ft. (11,175 square feet (1,038.2 m^{2}) with the intention of building a five-story building on it. However, the building would only be three stories and was completed in 1912.

- 1924: added a new six-story building; the "New Buffums'" opened in stages in early May, 1924
- 1941: built the "Autoport" parking garage (still standing)
- 1960: added a Varsity Shop, Red Cross Shoe Store, and four-story parking garage
- 1964: added 14,000 sq. ft., expanded to occupy the full block of Broadway between Pine and Pacific, for a total of 180,000 square feet (17,000 m^{2}) of floor space in the Downtown flagship complex. The new space housed a full Interior Design and Home Furnishings area as well as a "Sportsman's Shop".

The store competed downtown with smaller, local Long Beach department stores like Marti and Wise Cos. as well as Sears and Ward's, all of which opened large new stores downtown in 1928-9. In the early 1950s Lakewood Center would provide competition with May Company California and Los Altos Center, with The Broadway for the suburban shopper.

The complex was sold in 1981 and was demolished in 1985 to create office space (as of 2020 a WeWork,) and Buffums moved its Long Beach store operation and headquarters to the nearby Long Beach Plaza mall when it opened in 1982.

=== Branches ===
When Buffums was liquidated it had 16 locations:

City/community	Mall or street	Square feet	Square meters	Opened	Closed	Notes
Long Beach flagship	Fourth/Pine	180,000	16,723	1912	1982	Flagship store opened in 1912 and expanded over the decades. Closed in 1982, replaced by Long Beach Plaza store. Demolished 1985.
Santa Ana	Main/Bush/9th/10th	66,170	6,147	1950	1987	Freestanding store, Buffums' first branch and first store outside Long Beach. Built on site of Santa Ana Junior College which was demolished in 1947 and moved to 17th Street. Architects Wurdeman & Becket, who also designed Bullock's Pasadena. Opened on July 6, 1950. Men's store added across the street in 1963. Closed 1987. Buildings currently used by County of Orange Department of Probation, Community Court, and Department of Child Support Services.
Marina district, Long Beach	E. 2nd St. at PCH	17,000	1,579	1961	1976	Buffums launched the store as Buffums' Marina Sportswear and called it the "World's First Shopping Resort". It carried medium-priced to better-grade men's, women's and children's sportwear. Miss International 1960 Stella Márquez of Colombia cut the ribbon for the grand opening. Decor featured marine motifs and seafaring-related antiques. 2 stories. Parking for 200 cars plus several slips for patrons' boats. Closed when Buffums opened a full store nearby in 1976. Currently a CVS Pharmacy, 6265 E. 2nd St.
Pomona	Pomona Mall East	144,000	13,378	1962	1991	Located along Pomona's former downtown pedestrian mall, designed by Pomona native Millard Sheets. The Palomare Room featured two murals by Sheets of early Spanish settlement of the Pomona Valley, 24 and 36 ft (7.3 and 11.0 m) long.
Palos Verdes Peninsula	Peninsula Center	43,000	3,995	1963	1991	
Lakewood	Lakewood Center	73,000	6,800	1965	1991	Became Pacific's Lakewood Center South Theatres in 1992, later demolished after it closed in 2008.
Newport Beach	Fashion Island	54,000	5,000	1967	1991	Opened September 9, 1967 together with the mall. Welton Becket and Associates, architects. Space was subdivided after Buffums closed.
La Habra	La Habra Fashion Square	120,000	11,150	1968		Opened August 10, 1968. Furniture and chandeliers by designer for stage and film Tony Duquette.
San Diego	Fashion Valley	80,000	7,432	1969	1991	Later occupied for about a year by I. Magnin, then Saks Fifth Avenue and now Forever 21
Laguna Hills	Laguna Hills Mall	50,000	4,645	1973	1991	Opened September 5, 1973. Two levels.
Arcadia	Santa Anita Fashion Park			1974	1991	Opened together with mall on October 14, 1974, Demolished and replaced by Nordstrom in 1994.
Westminster	Westminster Mall	90,000	8,361	1975	1991	First became Robinsons-May Home Store, later demolished for Macy's in 2002, now Target
Marina Pacifica, Long Beach	Marina Pacifica Mall	39,000	3,623	1976	1991	Two stories. Moved its Marina branch to Marina Pacifica from a smaller adjacent 17,000 sq ft (1,600 m^{2}) location. At the time, the new Buffum's formed part of a 108-store, six-restaurant center.
Glendale	Glendale Galleria	90,000	8,361	1976	1990	Opened together with The Broadway August 1976 prior to the rest of the mall opening two months later. Closed 1990. Demolished and replaced by Robinsons-May in 1993 and Target in 2007
La Mesa	Grossmont Center			1979	1991	Added in 1979 as a third anchor store in a newly constructed wing. Became an Oshman's, later Sports Authority, now a Restoration Hardware Outlet
Manhattan Beach	Manhattan Village			1980	1991	Became a Macy's Men and Home Store, which closed in 2018. Urban Outfitters, Anthropologie, and West Elm now occupy the space.
Downtown Long Beach	Long Beach Plaza			1982	1991	Replaced the 180,000 sq ft (17,000 m^{2}) 1912 flagship store.
La Cañada Flintridge	Plaza de la Cañada			1986	1991	Former Iver's store; rebranded on October 1, 1986. Currently a TJ Maxx as of 2021.
Palm Springs	Palm Springs Mall			1989	1991	Opened as a Walker Scott (1970). Re-opened as Buffums on October 18, 1989. Then became a Harris Gottschalks (1990). The mall is now College of the Desert.
Solana Beach	Lomas Santa Fe Plaza			1989	1991	Opened as a Walker Scott (1970), later a Ross Dress for Less and now a HomeGoods.

== Relaunch ==
A California investor group filed Buffums' Stores, LLC. with the California Secretary of State in January 2015. According to the buffumstores Facebook site, they re-launched in a small specialty format in October 2015, located in the Belmont Shore neighborhood of Long Beach. This reappearance of the Buffums name in retail was short-lived, however, as the former principals of Buffums Stores, Inc. moved their operations to Naples, FL, opening their store there under the name The b.Store, and shuttering the Belmont Shore 2nd street Buffums storefront in March 2016.

== See also ==
- Dorothy Buffum Chandler
