= Robertson's department store =

Robertson's department store may refer to:

- Robertson Company also known as Robertson's department store, Hollywood, California
- Robertson's department store, South Bend, Indiana
