= Bon Marché (disambiguation) =

Le Bon Marché is a French department store.

Bon Marché, from the French for "good value", may also refer to:

- Bonmarché, a British clothing store chain
- Bon Marché (Brixton), a former department store in Brixton, London UK.
- The Bon Marché, a former Seattle, Washington-based chain of American department stores that was absorbed into Macy's
- Bon Marche Department Store, a historic building in Seattle
- The Bon Marché (Los Angeles), or the Bumiller Building, a 1906–1907 department store in Los Angeles, California, US
- The Bon Marché (Lowell), a former department store in Lowell, Massachusetts, US
- The Bon Marché Building of Asheville, North Carolina, US, a former department store
- Bon Marche Building, a historic building in College Park, South Australia
- Bon Marché Arcade in Perth, Australia
