= Manhattan Beach Pier =

Historic site in Manhattan Beach, California, United States

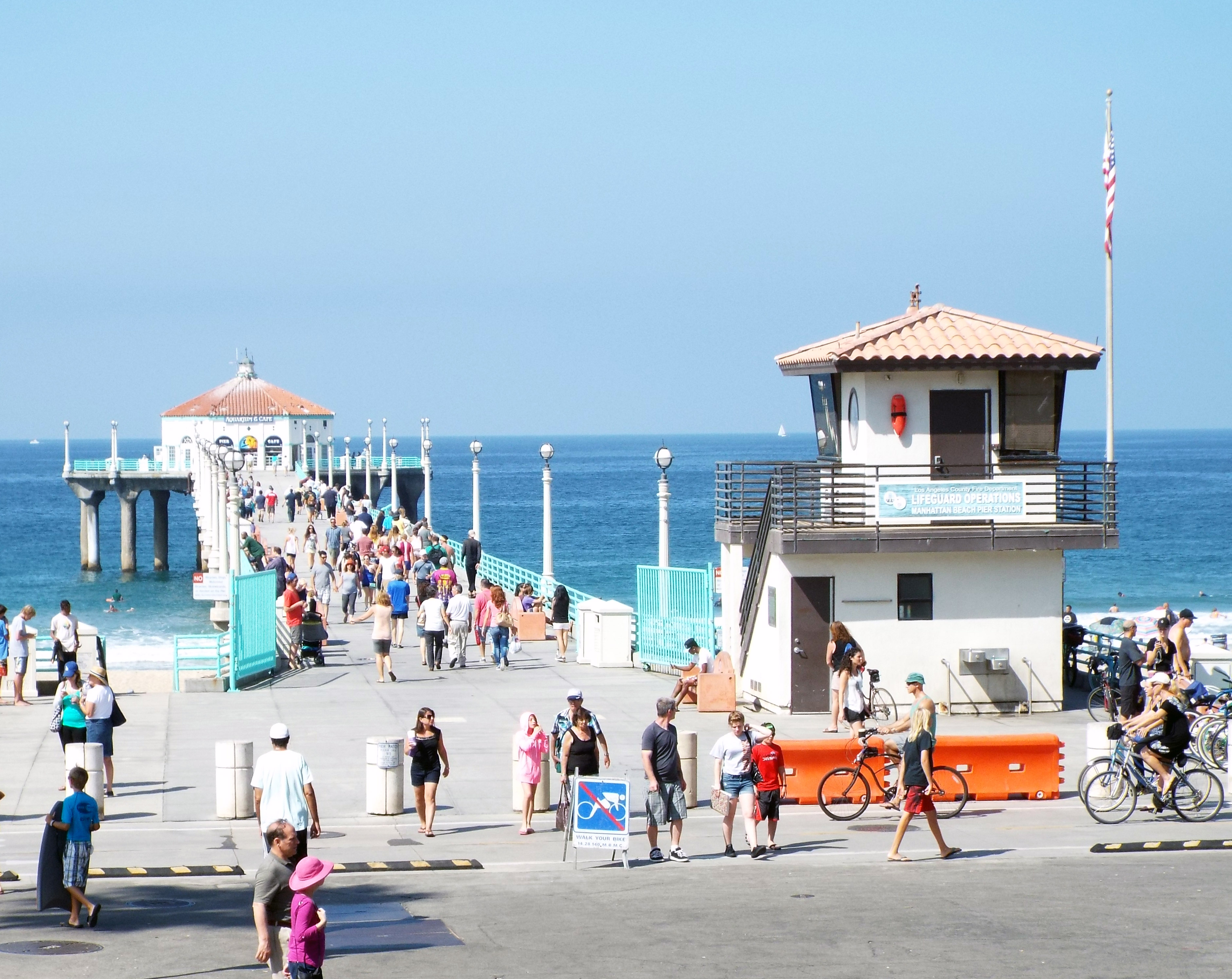
- The municipal pier in downtown Manhattan Beach on a typical summer day

- Location in Los Angeles County
- 33.88374°N 118.41361°W
- Location: The west end of Manhattan Beach Boulevard, Manhattan Beach, California

History
- Built: 1920

Site notes
- Architect: City Engineer A.L. Harris

California Historical Landmark
- Official name: Manhattan Beach State Pier
- Reference no.: 1018

The Manhattan Beach Pier is a pier located in Manhattan Beach, California, on the coast of the Pacific Ocean. The pier is 928 feet (283 m) long and located at the end of Manhattan Beach Boulevard. An octagonal Mediterranean-style building sits at the end of the pier and houses the Roundhouse Aquarium. Surfers usually can be seen below the pier. The pier is popular with locals, tourists, photographers, and artists and for fishing. It offers sunsets and vantage points from the shore and hillside. The pier includes the Volleyball Walk of Fame, featuring plaques dedicated to past winners of the Manhattan Beach Open beach volleyball tournament.

== History ==
=== Pre-history ===
In 1897, the Potencia Company was incorporated to develop land in the area and proposed a seaside resort with wharves and piers. The area was named Potencia, but the city of Manhattan was incorporated in 1912 with the word "Beach" being added in 1927. The name was chosen by land developer Stewart Merrill.

A pier is believed to have been one of the first features built when the Manhattan Beach community was developed. Two wooden piers were built in 1901, one at Center Street (later renamed Manhattan Beach Boulevard) and one at Marine Avenue called Peck's Pier and Pavilion.

The Center Street Pier was 900 feet (270 m) long and pylons were made by fastening three railroad rails together and driving them into the ocean floor. It supported a narrow wooden deck and wave motor to generate power for the Strand lighting system, but sources disagree about whether the system worked. Part of the wave motor may still be buried in the sands at the shore end of the present pier. This "old iron pier", as it was called, was destroyed by a major storm in 1913.

=== Current pier ===
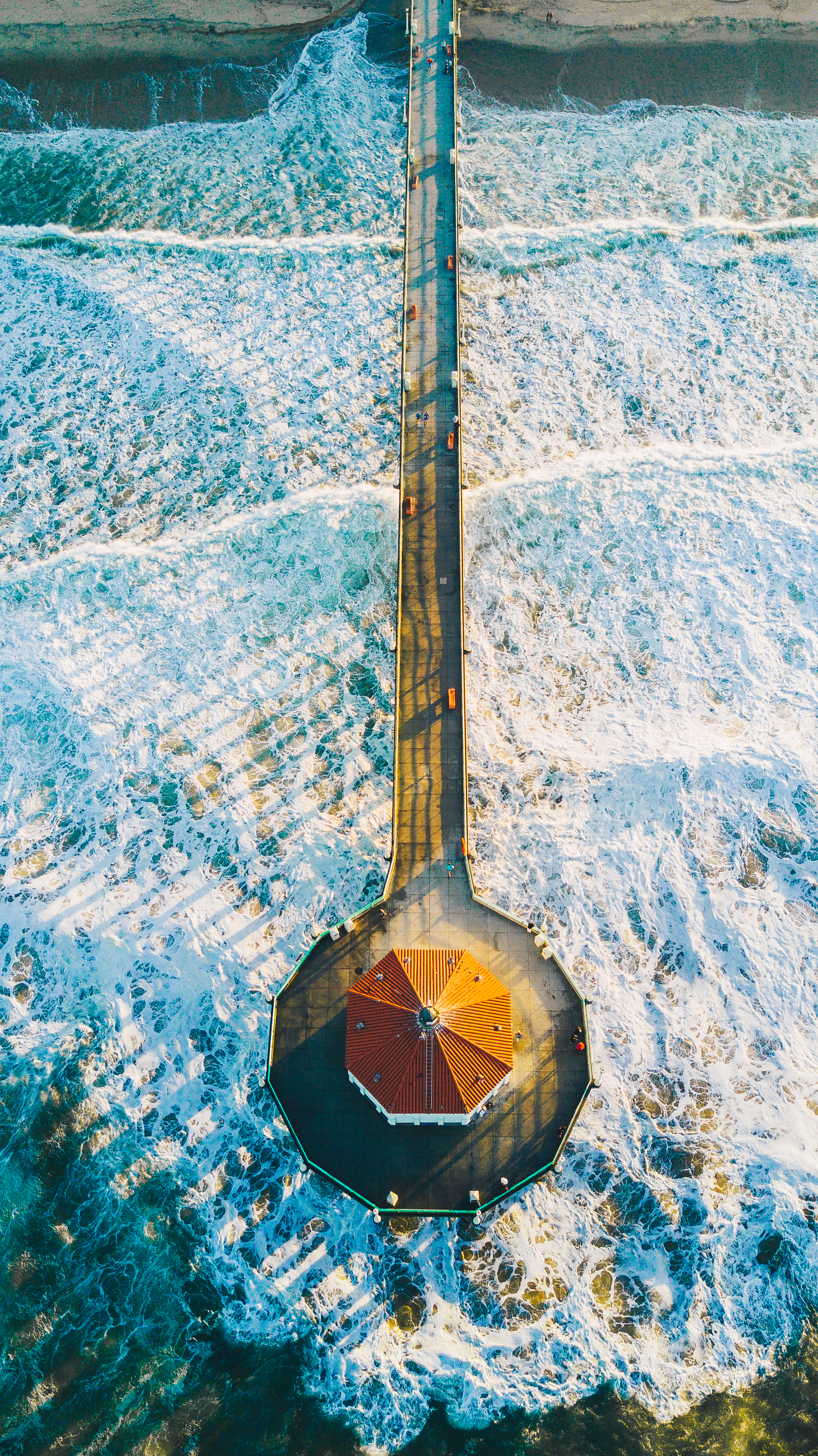
Aerial view of the pier.

Lack of money, lawsuits, storms, World War I and debates about when and where to build another pier delayed Manhattan Beach from having a pier completed until 1920. Engineer A.L. Harris developed the concept of the circular end for less exposure and damage to the pilings by the waves. The pier was completed and dedicated on July 5, 1920. It was a cement pier with a rounded end and it was 928 feet (283 m) long. An octagonal structure that once held a lunch restaurant was completed in 1922.

In 1928 the pier was extended out 200 feet (61 m) (at no cost to the city) when a Captain Larsen of Redondo Beach offered to pay for an extension in exchange for the rights to run a shoreboat between the pier and his barge Georgina. On January 9, 1940, 90 feet (27 m) of the extension was ripped away during a winter storm. The extension was never repaired and the remaining section was swept away in February 1941.

In 1946, the pier and adjoining beach were deeded over from the city of Manhattan Beach to the state. During the next four decades, the pier would remain a focus of beachfront activity, but Mother Nature and old age took their toll and by the 1980s the pier was in sad shape and in need of renovation.

Restoration took place in the early 1990s with a focus on retention of the old-time appearance, much like Pier 7 in San Francisco. The original pier had to be fixed as old age and decay required extensive repair, and in fact made it unsafe by the late 1980s (when a jogger was injured by falling concrete). The pier was restored to its 1920s appearance and a dedication ceremony was held in 1992.

In 1995, the pier was declared a state historic landmark. It is the oldest standing concrete pier on the West Coast. It is managed by the County of Los Angeles, Department of Beaches and Harbors.

California Historical Landmark Marker NO. 1018 at the site reads:

NO. 1018 MANHATTAN BEACH STATE PIER - Designed by City Engineer A.L. Harris, this pier was constructed by the City of Manhattan Beach during the years 1917-1920. The roundhouse building was added a year later. Harris' innovative design featured a rounded end to the pier, which helped it withstand the pounding of the Pacific. Although the roundhouse was reconstructed in 1989, the pier itself survives as Southern California's oldest remaining example of early reinforced concrete pier construction.

== Attractions ==
=== Roundhouse Marine Studies Lab and Aquarium ===
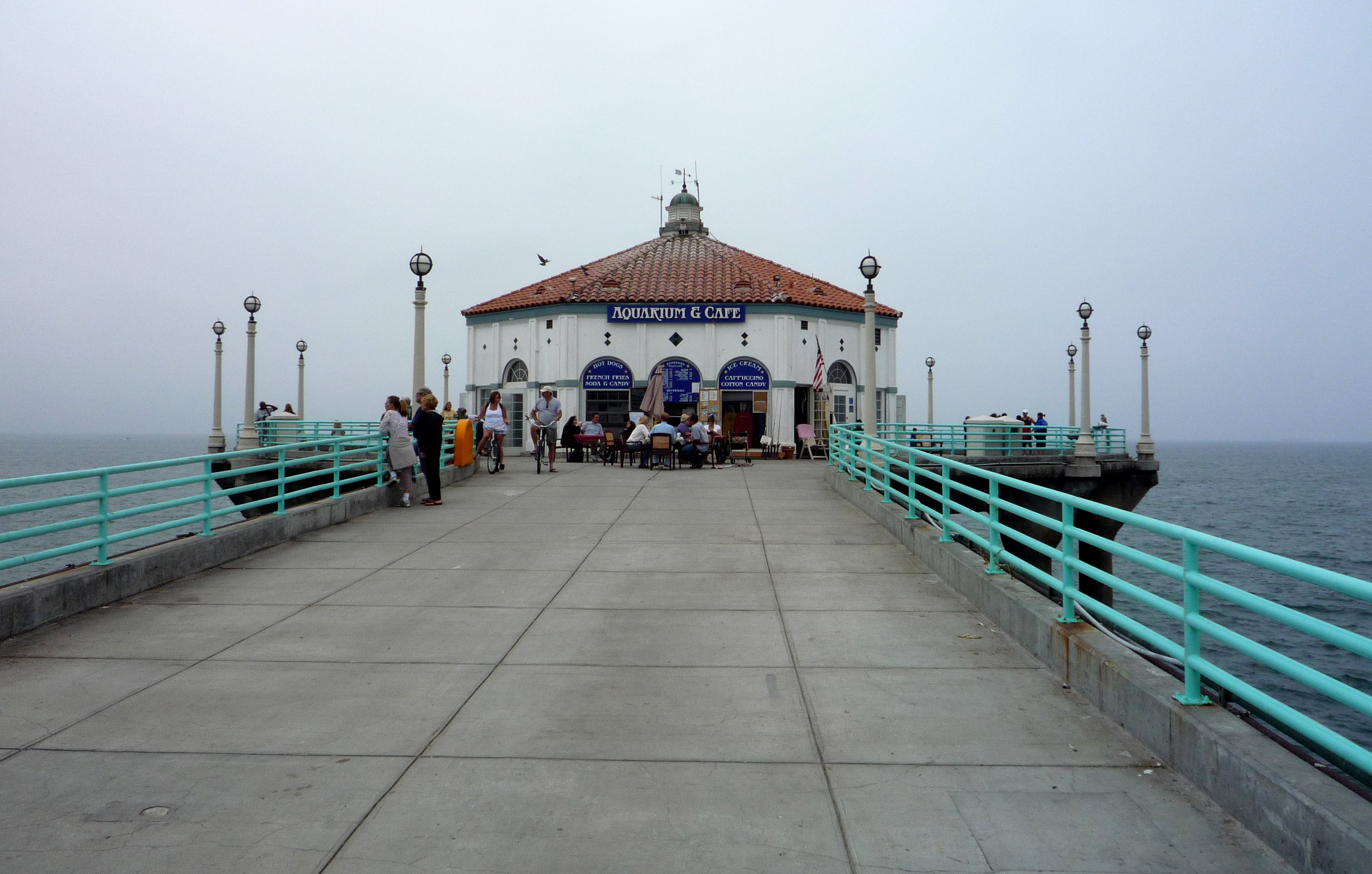
Aquarium and cafe at the end of the pier before the remodel.

The Roundhouse Marine Studies Lab and Aquarium is located at the end of the pier, and is free to the public. The Aquarium includes a shark tank, tide pool touch tank with animals common to Southern California, tanks with lobsters, and baby sharks as well as brightly colored, non-native fish and invertebrates. During the summer, the aquarium is open from 2 PM to 5 PM on weekdays and 10 AM to sunset on weekends. During the rest of the year, it is open from 2 PM to 8 PM on weekdays and 9 AM to 8 AM on weekends.

In January 2018, the aquarium was closed and construction began on a major renovation project. The sealife was relocated to a temporary structure near the entrance to the pier during the renovations. The aquarium reopened on November 5, 2018 with an all-new interior.

The octagonal building includes a Spanish tile roof and large gooseneck reflectors to improve lighting.

=== Fishing ===
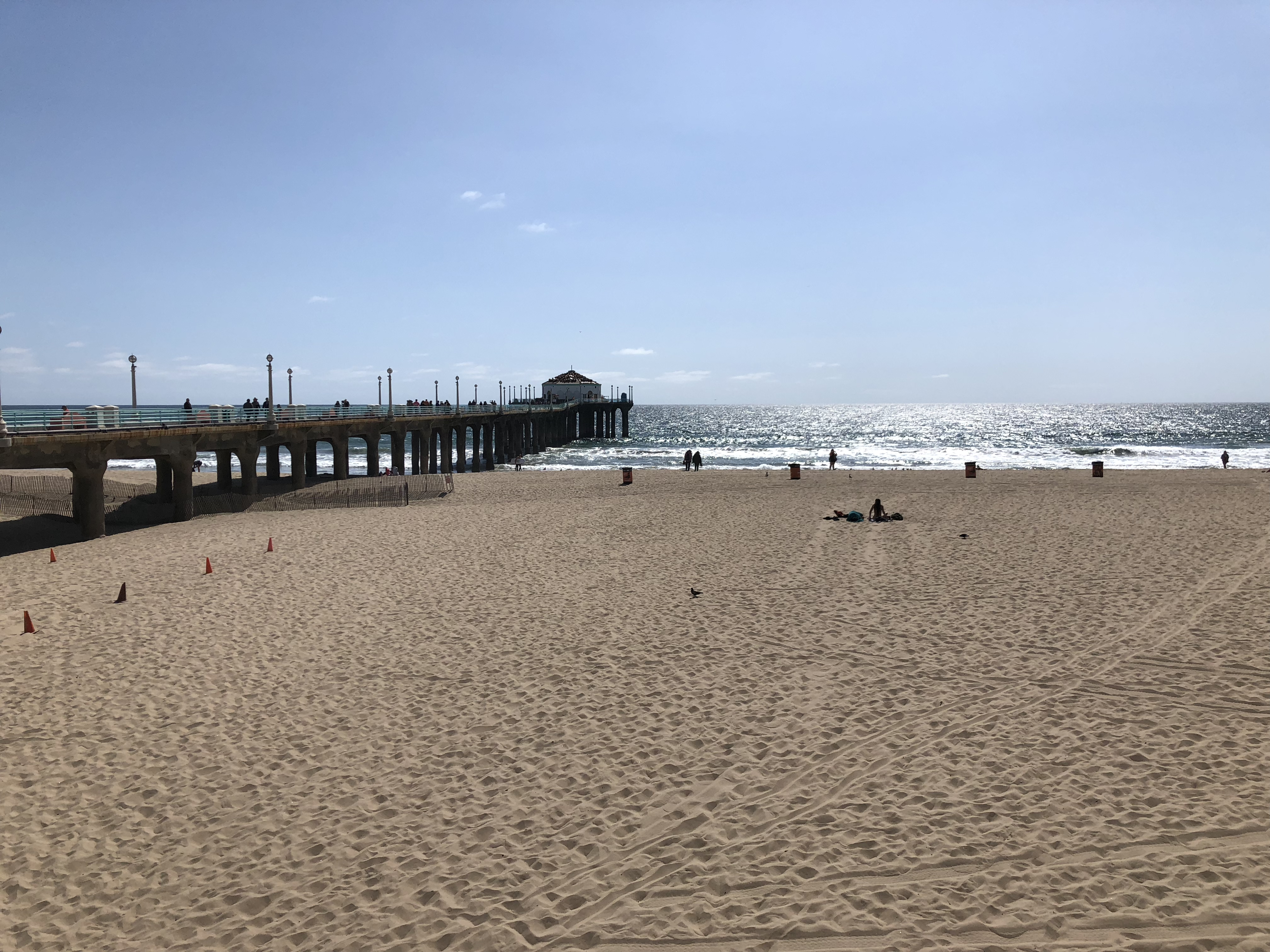
Many activities around the pier involve fishing, surfing, and various beach activities.

According to Pierfishing.com the sandy beach area yields the normal surf species: barred surfperch, croakers, small rays and guitarfish (shovelnose shark). The pier is known for barred surfperch fishing. At times, anglers catch hundreds of them within an hour of time, using mainly small jigs and sand crabs. The area around the pilings yields pileperch, walleye surfperch, silver surfperch, and other common pier species. Mid-pier, casting away from the pier, yields small tom cod (white croaker) and herring (queenfish), jacksmelt, yellowfin croaker and an occasional halibut.

Action at the end of the pier is improved by the surrounding artificial reef, which is located about 65 feet (20 m) from the end. Fish at the deepest water end include bonito, Pacific mackerel, jack mackerel, barracuda, an occasional white sea bass or even yellowtail, and reef visitors like kelp bass, sand bass and sculpin (scorpionfish). The resident species in Santa Monica Bay may be dangerous to eat, but those that migrate in and out of the bay are considered safe to eat. A variety of baits are utilized.

=== Surfing ===
The pier played a significant role in the history of surfing. The pier was a popular spot for Southern California surfers in the 1940s, the early days of modern surfing. Dale Velzy, the first commercial surfboard shaper, started his business building and repairing boards under the pier before renting a nearby storefront in 1949, starting what is considered the first surf shop.

=== Paddleboard race ===
The Catalina Classic Paddleboard Race to Catalina Island begins here. A sculpture of Duke Kahanamoku flanked by a male knee paddler and a female prone paddler commemorating the race was installed in 2023.

== In popular culture ==
In film

- Point Break (1991) – Keanu Reeves buys his surfboard from a shop located on the pier.
- Starsky & Hutch (2004) – Starsky (Ben Stiller), can be seen stretching under the pier.
- Tequila Sunrise (1988) – Mel Gibson's character lives on the beach near the pier.
- A Star is Born (1937) — The closing scenes were filmed beside the pier.

Other

- Mario Kart Tour (2019) — Players drive under the pier as part of the "Los Angeles Laps" race course. This course was later added to the game Mario Kart 8 Deluxe.

== See also ==
- Beach Cities
