= Marina Pacifica =

Shopping mall in California, US

Coordinates: 33.7607°N 118.1150°W

Marina Pacifica is a marina-adjacent shopping mall featuring movie theaters, shopping, dining & copious parking. It is in southeastern Long Beach, California between Second Street and the Los Cerritos Channel. The shopping center has variously been named Marina Pacifica Mall and Marina Pacifica Shopping Center.

Original construction of the shopping center in 1972-3 was a $100 million project of the Robert Tebbe and Southern California Financial corporations on 143 acres of land, an old oil tank farm and several capped oil wells, providing 250,000 square feet (23,000 m^{2}) of gross leasable area for retail, a cinema and offices, oriented to the adjacent marina. The concept was one of a "Mediterranean spa", and peach, oleander and other trees were planted. There was a bridge to an adjacent residential complex.

Long Beach-based Buffums department store moved in as an anchor in 1976, building a two-story, 39,000-square-foot (3,600 m^{2}) store designed by Associated Architects and Planners of Los Angeles, and moving its Marina branch from a smaller adjacent 17,000-square-foot (1,600 m^{2}) location. At the time, the new Buffum's formed part of a 108-store, six-restaurant center.

A 21,000-square-foot AMC Theatres multicinema was added in 1984.

By 1990, the Los Angeles Times characterized Marina Pacifica as an example of "the wrong way to build a mall", a "graveyard", with the staircases too hard to find, lack of a way between shops without traversing the parking lot, vacant storefronts, and a lack of attention. At the time, it was envisioned that Triple Five Joshi Development Co., partner of the Triple Five conglomerate that built the West Edmonton Mall, the world's largest at the time, would buy the Marina Pacifica Mall.

Buffum's closed all its branches including Marina Pacifica in 1990. In May 2020 it was announced Pier 1 would close all locations, including the Marinia Pacifica location. It was closed by August 2020.

Tower Records closed in 2007 and was replaced by Best Buy in 2008, which closed in October 2018. Club Studio, a new concept of luxury gym run by LA Fitness, has opened in this location since September 2023.

Current tenants include Nordstrom Rack, AMC Theatres, Barnes & Noble, Sit 'n Sleep, Acapulco, Buffalo Wild Wings, Chipotle, Starbucks, Ulta Beauty, Club Studio, and a Ralphs supermarket.
