= Manhattan Beach Boulevard =

East–west thoroughfare in Los Angeles, California

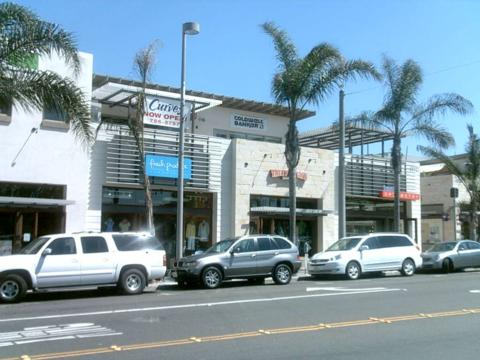
- Manhattan Beach Boulevard in Manhattan Beach, CA
- Length: 5.3 mi (8.5 km)
- Width: 6 lanes
- Location: Los Angeles County
- West end: Manhattan Beach Pier in Manhattan Beach; 33.8844°N 118.4117°W
- East end: Van Ness Avenue in Gardena; 33.8874°N 118.3178°W

Manhattan Beach Boulevard is a major east–west thoroughfare in western Los Angeles County, California. Its western terminus is at the historic Manhattan Beach Pier in Manhattan Beach on the coast of the Pacific Ocean, and its eastern terminus is at Van Ness Avenue in Gardena. It passes under Interstate 405, but does not have a direct interchange with that freeway (the nearest ramps are either north on Inglewood Avenue or south on Hawthorne Boulevard).

The boulevard is one of the five principal roadways in Manhattan Beach (the other four being Rosecrans Avenue, Sepulveda Boulevard (State Highway 1), Artesia Boulevard, and Aviation Boulevard), and the intersection between it and Sepulveda is one of the busiest in the city. Manhattan Beach Boulevard consists of at least six lanes for its entire length, with the exception of between Pacific Avenue and The Strand, where it is reduced to two lanes.

Manhattan Beach Boulevard provided service with Metro Local line 126, but the line was discontinued.
