= Long Beach Plaza =

Shopping mall in Long Beach, California

- Location: Downtown Long Beach, California
- Coordinates: 33°46′20″N 118°11′24″W
- Opened: April 30, 1982; 44 years ago
- Closed: 2000
- Demolished: 2000
- Developer: TrizecHahn
- Num. of stores: 149
- Num. of anchor tenants: 3
- Floor area: 900,000-square-foot (84,000 m^{2})
- Floors: 2

Long Beach Plaza was a two-level 900,000-square-foot (84,000 m^{2}) shopping mall located in Downtown Long Beach, California. The mall was demolished in 2000 and redeveloped into Long Beach City Place.

== History ==
The Hahn Company proposed the Long Beach Plaza in July of 1974. The shopping center opened on April 30, 1982 with JCPenney and Buffums as day one anchors and 60 of the 149 shops. The eight-block dumbbell-shaped mall was an enclosed structure and included a two-story deck parking structure on both sides and about 900,000 square feet (84,000 m^{2}) of shop space. Montgomery Ward was scheduled to open by late July.

Problems with the mall included the fact that the mall structure (which included stores that faced inward) had no connection with the rest of Downtown Long Beach area. The closure of the nearby Naval stations in the 1990s also contributed to the slow demise of the mall.

In 1999, the mall was purchased by DDR Corp., Coventry Real Estate Partners and Prudential Real Estate as a joint venture. In 2000, the mall was demolished except for the parking structure. DDR eventually rebuilt the area and renamed it Long Beach City Place.
