= Manhattan Village =

Neighborhood in Manhattan Beach, California

Manhattan Village is a neighborhood in Manhattan Beach, California, founded in 1985. It was the "last major parcel available for development" in the city

Its construction was said to signify "the passing of an era – the removal of oil tanks and the beginning of development of more than 100 acres of formerly bare ground." At that time the city had a population of 30,245. Early concepts had included "a graveyard, a regional wilderness park and a lake that could accommodate paddle boating and sailboating."

West of the 405 Freeway and east of Sepulveda Boulevard, the neighborhood adjoins Marine Avenue to the north and is south of Rosecrans Avenue. The first part to be developed was 37 acres on Sepulveda.

In earlier days, the petroleum-drilling area was part of Standard Oil's 186-acre "tank farm" which held oil used in steam engines and steamships, according to Richard J Miescke, vice president of the Southern Division of the Chevron Land & Development Co. "They built those reservoirs with mule teams back in the '20s," he said.

The development as announced in 1983 was to have 115 single-family, zero-lot line estate homes (priced from 295,000 to $415,000), 177 town houses and 223 court homes.

Chevron was to sell four acres of its property for about eighty units of affordable rental housing.

Property sales were halted in June 1985 because of methane vapors discovered at the 76-acre site. After tests, there were found to be "no significant problems," said Nester Acedera of the state's Department of Health Services, and sales were resumed. A temporary vapor-venting system was put in place.

== Shopping center ==
Manhattan Village
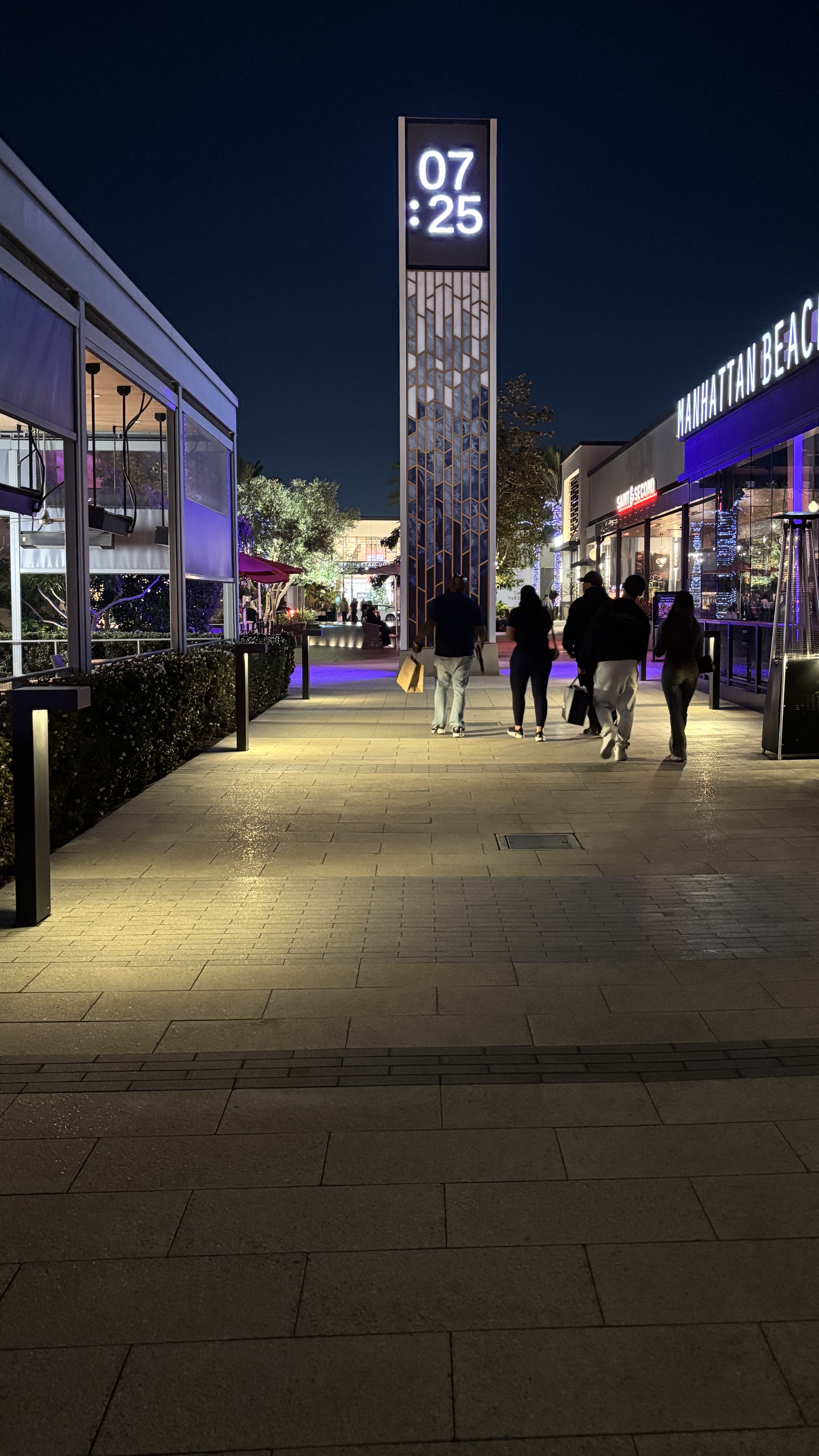
- Manhattan Village by night
- Location: Manhattan Village, Manhattan Beach
- Coordinates: 33.899295°N 118.393661°W
- Address: 3200 N Sepulveda Blvd, Manhattan Beach, CA 90266
- Website: https://www.shopmanhattanvillage.com/

"Manhattan Village" also refers to the mixed-use retail and office center in that same neighborhood. The property spans some 44 acres (18 ha) and features several shopping, dining, and retail destinations. The property consists of enclosed retail space, a community center, and offices.

=== Opening ===
Ground was broken in 1979, and the first retail phase consisted of an outdoor section including a Ralphs supermarket, Sav-On Drugs (now CVS Pharmacy since 2006) and smaller shops, opening in 1980. The mall itself opened with anchors Buffums in 1981 and Bullock's in 1982. The site was originally part of a melon and lima bean farm, which Standard Oil purchased in 1911 and thus became a Chevron oil tank farm serving its nearby refinery.

=== 1990s ===
Macy's opened in the former Bullock's space in 1996, and a Macy's Men's and Home store (closed in 2018) in the former Buffums. Urban Outfitters, Anthropologie, and West Elm now occupy the space.

Owner Haagen sold the mall for $70 million to the Pacific Telesis pension fund in 1990. The mall's first remodel took place in 1992.

=== 2000s ===
In May 2004, the property was purchased by RREF, a private real estate fund owned by Deutsche Bank. In November of the following year, 3500 Sepulveda purchased the building with the same address, located near the northwest corner of the property.

One of its most anticipated and influential tenants arrived when the Apple Store opened for business at the mall on July 30, 2005. It was the first of the two Apple Stores (the other being at Del Amo, which opened on September 20, 2024) operating in the South Bay.

A year after it opened in 2006, its current owner, the Deutsche Bank-owned real estate trust firm RREEF America LLC, began talking with the city of Manhattan Beach about a long-range development plan for the mall and surrounding area. RREEF had purchased the mall in 2004.

In 2006, another remodel of the property was proposed. The proposal was heard by the city council several times until construction finally began in 2018 under real estate management company JLL.

=== 2010s ===
In 2012, the still-not-approved plan was revised and now had a $110 million scope. Construction and renovation began in 2017. The remodel included:

- a renovation of existing retail space (completed spring 2018)
- a new Macy's building to replace and consolidate both its main store and Men's and Home store (completed late 2018)
- new parking (completed late 2018), and
- expansion of the outdoor shopping area, "Village Shops" (completed 2019 and 2020)

== See also ==
- Del Amo Fashion Center
- South Bay Galleria
