= Manhattan Beach, California =

City in California, United States

- City
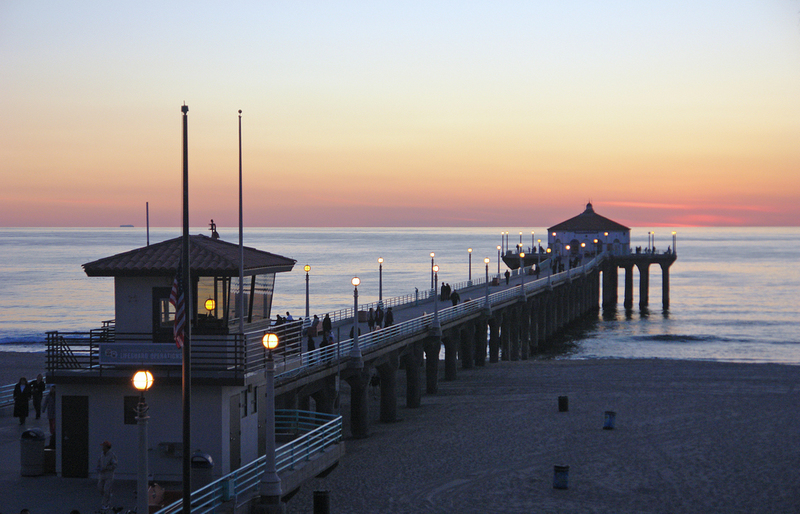
- The Manhattan Beach Pier on a typical fall afternoon

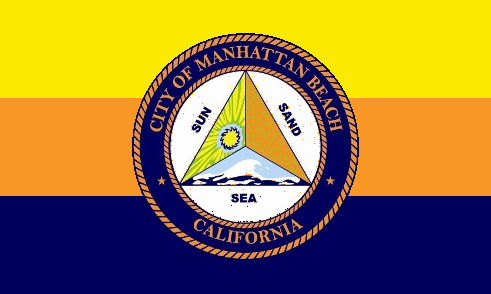
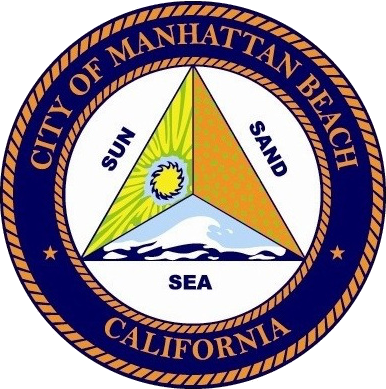
- Flag Seal
- Motto(s): "Sun, Sand, Sea"
- Interactive map of Manhattan Beach, California
- Location in the United States
- Coordinates: 33°53′20″N 118°24′19″W
- Country: United States
- State: California
- County: Los Angeles
- Incorporated: December 12, 1912
- Named for: Manhattan

Government
  - Type: Council-Manager
  - Mayor: Joe Franklin
  - Mayor Pro Tem: Nina Tarnay
  - City Council: Steve Charelian, Amy Howorth, David Lesser
  - City Manager: Talyn Mirzakhanian
  - City Treasurer: Tim Lilligren

Area
  - Total: 3.94 sq mi (10.20 km^{2})
  - Land: 3.93 sq mi (10.19 km^{2})
  - Water: 0.0039 sq mi (0.01 km^{2}) 0.1%
- Elevation: 66 ft (20 m)

Population (2020)
  - Total: 35,506
  - Estimate (2022): 34,137
  - Density: 9,025.4/sq mi (3,484.7/km^{2})
- Time zone: UTC-8 (Pacific)
  - Summer (DST): UTC-7 (PDT)
- ZIP codes: 90266, 90267
- Area codes: 310/424
- FIPS code: 06-45400
- GNIS feature IDs: 1660985, 2411020
- Website: www.manhattanbeach.gov

Manhattan Beach is a city in southwestern Los Angeles County, California, United States, on the Pacific coast south of El Segundo, west of Hawthorne, and north of Redondo Beach and Hermosa Beach. As of the 2020 census, the population was 35,506.

Together with Hermosa Beach and Redondo Beach, it forms the three Beach Cities within the South Bay region of Los Angeles County. The community is known for a long beach stretching approximately 2.1 miles (3.4 km) and roughly 450 feet (140 m) wide. The climate is moderate because of Manhattan Beach's proximity to the Pacific Ocean, with an average year-round high temperature of 69.1 °F (20.6 °C) and an average year-round low of 56.4 °F (13.6 °C).

== History ==
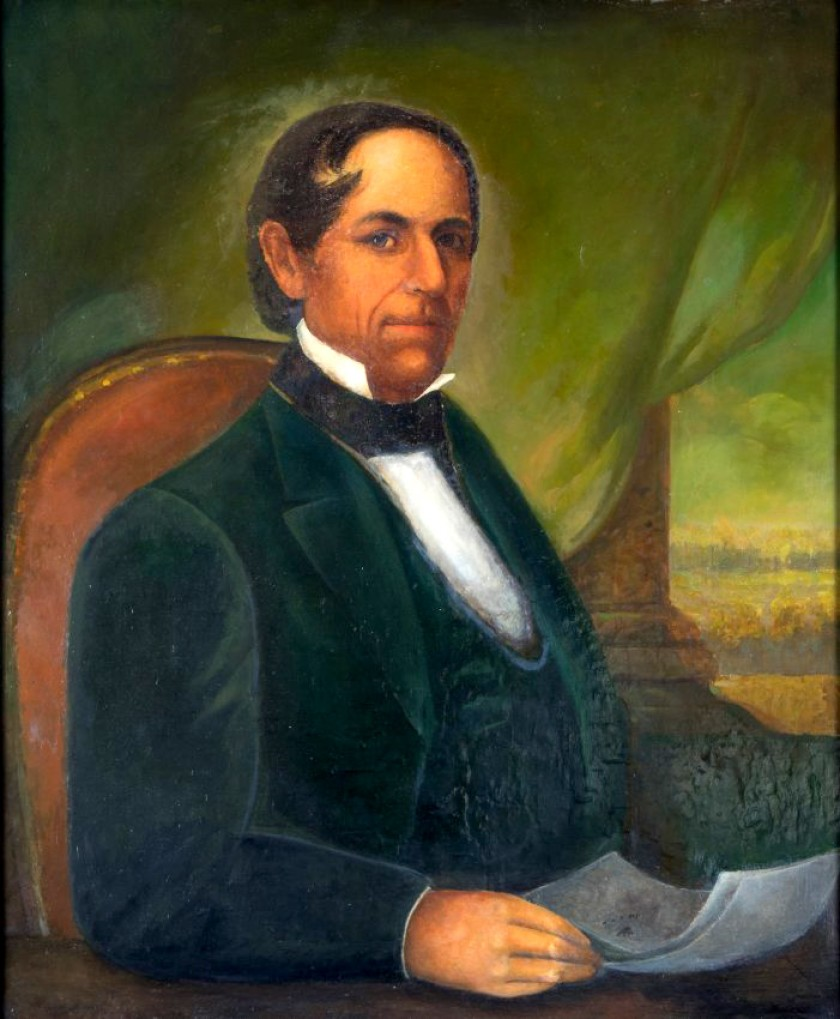
Don Manuel Domínguez, owner of Rancho San Pedro, which included modern-day Manhattan Beach

The sandy coastal area was likely inhabited by the Tongva tribe of Native Americans. Archeological work in the nearby Chowigna excavation shows evidence of inhabitants as far back as 7,100 years ago. The Tongva Village of Ongovanga was located near neighboring Redondo Beach.

In the mid-18th century, the Portolá expedition was the first European land exploration of present-day California. It traveled north from San Diego to the San Gabriel Valley, Los Angeles Basin, San Fernando Valley, Monterey Bay, and San Francisco Bay. In 1784, the Spanish Crown deeded Rancho San Pedro, a tract of over 75,000 acres (300 km^{2}), to soldier Juan José Domínguez. It included what is today the entire Port of Los Angeles; San Pedro, Los Angeles; Harbor City, Los Angeles; Wilmington, Los Angeles; Carson; Compton; the Dominguez Hills; Lomita; the Palos Verdes Peninsula; Redondo Beach; Hermosa Beach; Manhattan Beach; and Torrance.

In 1863, a Scottish immigrant, Sir Robert Burnett, purchased Rancho Sausal Redondo and Rancho Aguaje de la Centinela from Avila's heirs for $33,000. Ten years later, in 1873, Burnett leased the ranch to a Canadian, Daniel Freeman (not the American of the same name, who was the first to file a claim under the Homestead Act of 1862). Burnett returned to Scotland. Freeman moved his wife and three children onto the ranch and started growing various crops. On May 4, 1885, Freeman bought the ranch from Burnett for $140,000. At some point after this, the location was informally called "Shore Acres." Shortly thereafter, in 1888, the area's first freight and passenger railroad tracks were built by the Santa Fe Railroad Company. The tracks ran through today’s Manhattan Beach and spanned all the way to Redondo Beach with a substation constructed in later years at Center Street, which today is Manhattan Beach Boulevard.

George H. Peck owned the land that became part of the north section of Manhattan Beach. A coin flip decided the town's name. Around 1902, the beach suburb was named "Manhattan" after developer Stewart Merrill's home, the New York City borough of Manhattan. "Beach" was appended to the city's name at the behest of the postmaster. In 1912, incorporation of the City of Manhattan Beach won a vote held on November 26 and took effect on December 7.

Mrs. W. A. Bruce, a landowner of property near the coast, created the first beach resort for Black Americans in Southern California, Bruce's Beach. Bruce set up a small portable cottage with a stand in front where soda and lunches were sold. There were two dressing tents with showers, and fifty bathing suits were available for rent. Peck's land was located between Bruce's land and the beach itself, and Peck erected "no trespassing signs" on his land, which required beachgoers to walk a half-mile around his land in order to go to the beach. Many beachgoers did so, which made the nearby white landowners unhappy. In the 1920s, the Ku Klux Klan began violently harassing the resort's visitors, the Bruce family, and four other Black families that bought lots. In 1924, the city used eminent domain to seize the land from the Black property owners under the pretense of building a park. Bruce's attorney noted that there was a lot of vacant property located on both sides of Bruce's Beach that could have been used for a public park, and that the city's insistence on seizing Bruce's property was a ruse to carry out the city's racist objection to Black people using the public beach. In 2021, California Governor Gavin Newsom signed legislation authorizing the transfer of the property to descendants of the family.

The land in Manhattan Beach was formerly sand dunes. During the 1920s and 1930s, Kuhn Brothers Construction Company leveled uneven sandy sites, and some excess sand was sold and shipped to Waikiki, Hawaii to convert their reef and rock beach into a sandy beach.

The McMartin preschool trials, an example of day care sex abuse hysteria, started with investigations of a Manhattan Beach preschool in 1983. The trials ran from 1987 to 1990 and resulted in no convictions. HBO dramatized this case in the Emmy-winning Indictment: The McMartin Trial, which was partially filmed in Manhattan Beach.

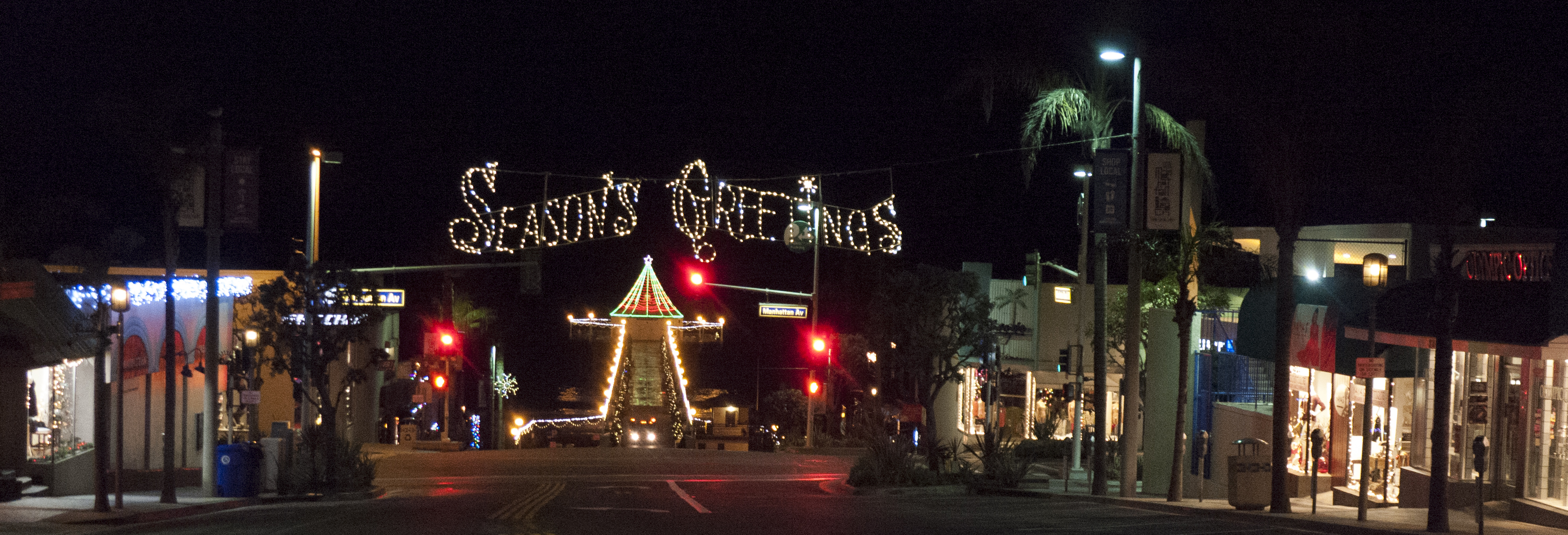
The Manhattan Beach Pier in 2013

== Geography ==
=== Climate ===
Climate data for Manhattan Beach, California
Month	Jan	Feb	Mar	Apr	May	Jun	Jul	Aug	Sep	Oct	Nov	Dec	Year
Record high °F (°C)	91 (33)	92 (33)	95 (35)	102 (39)	97 (36)	104 (40)	97 (36)	98 (37)	110 (43)	106 (41)	101 (38)	94 (34)	110 (43)
Mean daily maximum °F (°C)	64.9 (18.3)	63.7 (17.6)	64.3 (17.9)	65.9 (18.8)	68.1 (20.1)	71.3 (21.8)	74.4 (23.6)	75.2 (24.0)	74.9 (23.8)	72.8 (22.7)	68.9 (20.5)	65.2 (18.4)	69.1 (20.6)
Mean daily minimum °F (°C)	49.3 (9.6)	50.2 (10.1)	51.9 (11.1)	54.1 (12.3)	56.7 (13.7)	61.3 (16.3)	64.1 (17.8)	64.4 (18.0)	62.9 (17.2)	59.3 (15.2)	53.3 (11.8)	48.9 (9.4)	56.4 (13.5)
Record low °F (°C)	27 (−3)	34 (1)	35 (2)	42 (6)	45 (7)	48 (9)	52 (11)	51 (11)	47 (8)	43 (6)	38 (3)	32 (0)	27 (−3)
Average precipitation inches (mm)	2.71 (69)	3.35 (85)	1.85 (47)	0.7 (18)	0.22 (5.6)	0.08 (2.0)	0.03 (0.76)	0.05 (1.3)	0.21 (5.3)	0.56 (14)	1.11 (28)	2.05 (52)	12.92 (327.96)
Source: The Weather Channel

Manhattan Beach benefits from ocean breezes that provide clean air and summer temperatures that are 10 to 20 °F (5.6 to 11.1 °C) cooler than the inland regions of Southern California.

The city has a total area of 3.9 square miles (10 km^{2}). Manhattan Beach features 2.1 miles (3.4 km) of ocean frontage.

=== Beach and sand dunes ===
A majority of the land in Manhattan Beach was once exposed sand dunes, which now lie beneath the city's buildings and streets. The underlying dunes afford residents ocean views throughout the western portions of the city. The tallest hill is 244 feet high, and it is located in the city's southwest region. The only remaining exposed sand dune is at Sand Dune Park, where sand resembling the original landscape can also be found. In the late 1920s, excess sand from Manhattan Beach was purchased by Hawaiʻian developers, who negotiated a deal with the Kuhn Brothers Construction Company to ship the sand across the Pacific Ocean from Manhattan Beach via Los Angeles Harbor to Waikiki Beach over a ten-year period.

The beach is approximately 2.1 miles long and 400 feet wide. In the early part of the last century, the beach was narrow (approximately 150 feet) and sloping. From 1938 to 1989, it more than doubled in width when large quantities of sand were placed on beaches to the north during construction of the Hyperion Treatment Plant, Marina del Rey, and Scattergood Power Plant. The sand was carried southward by the ocean's natural littoral flow and widened Manhattan Beach.

Every August, the city hosts the Manhattan Beach Open volleyball tournament and the International Surf Festival.

=== Neighborhoods ===
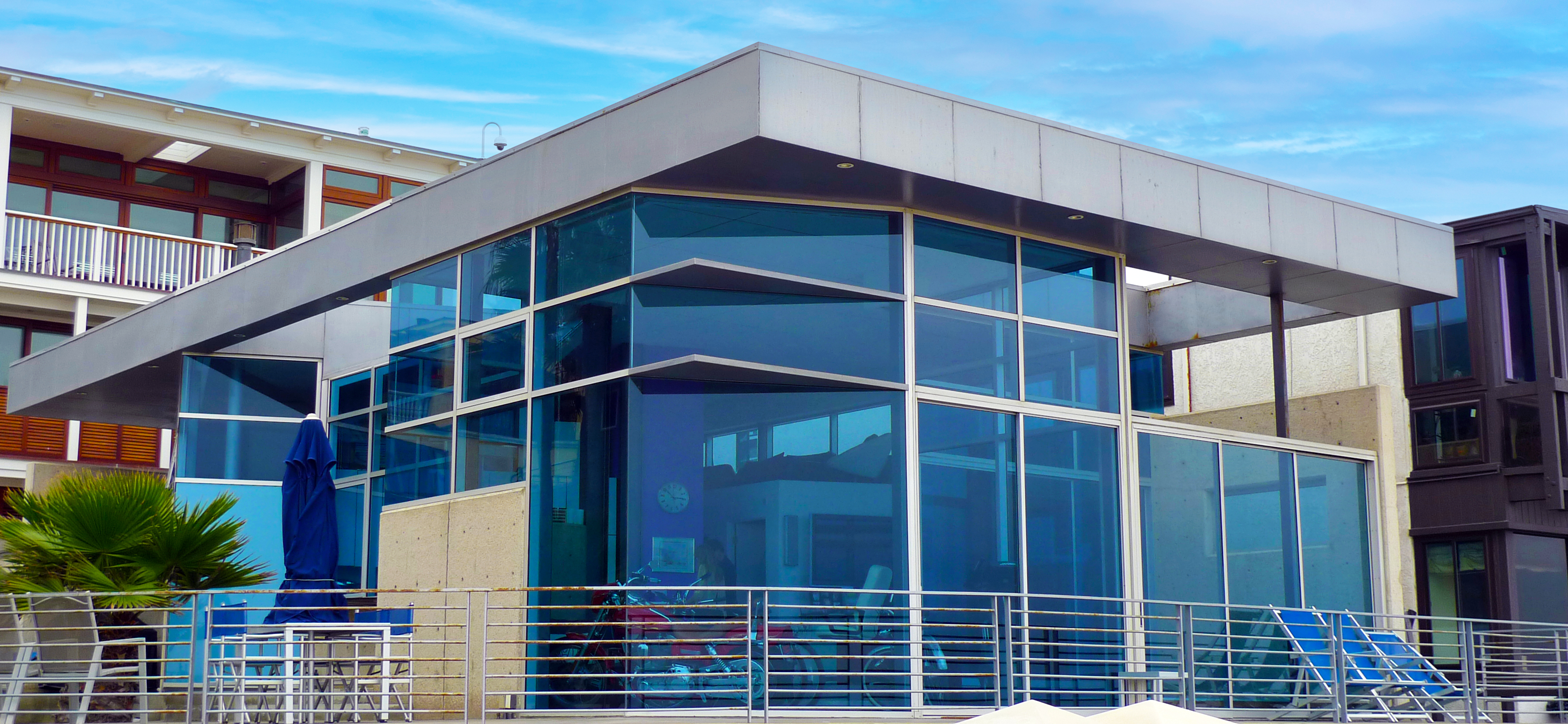
Glass home on the "Strand"

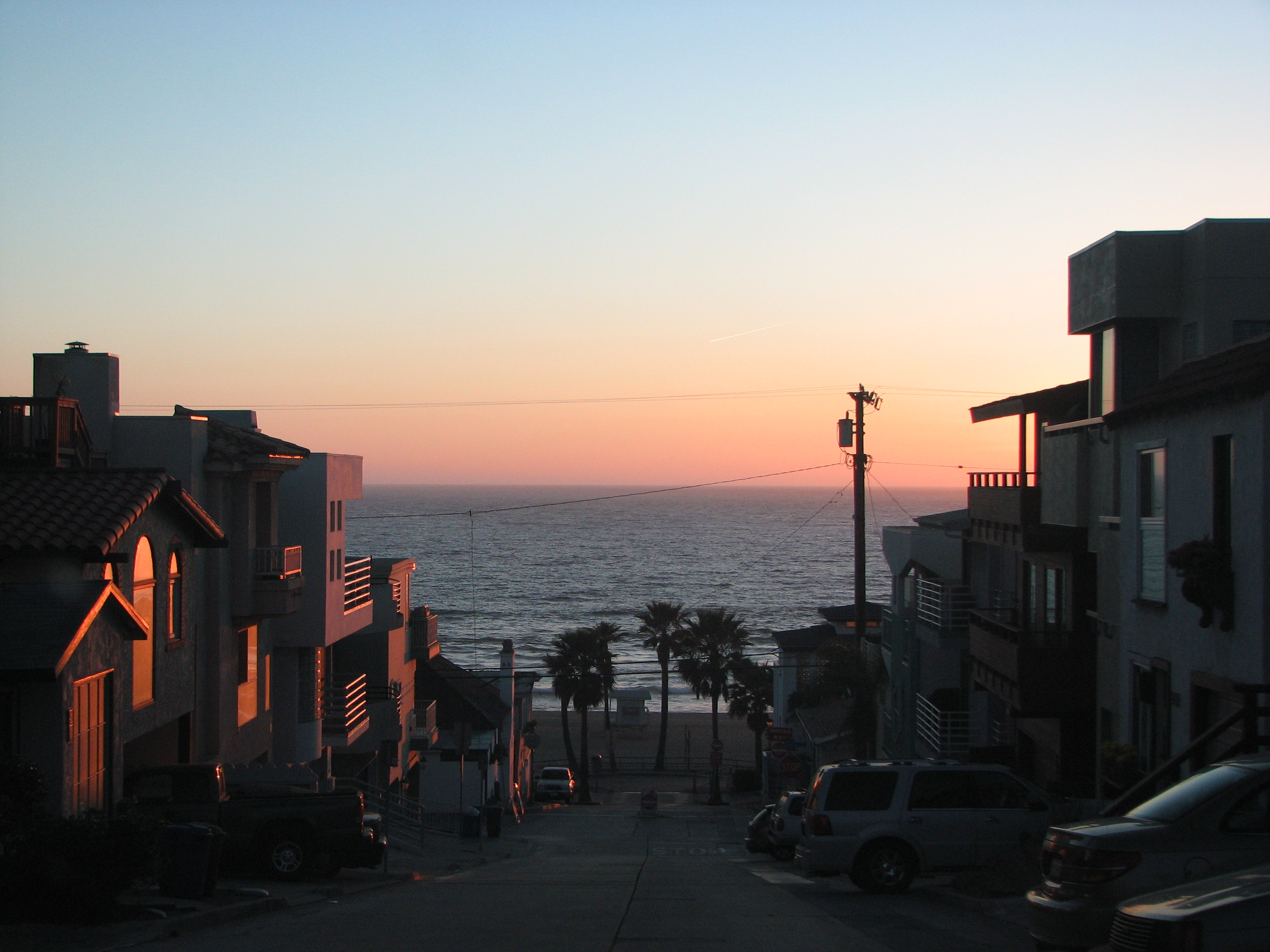
A view of the ocean in Manhattan Beach

The city has several distinct neighborhoods, including the "Strand", "Sand Section", "Hill Section", "Tree Section", "Gas Lamp Section", "Manhattan Village", "Manhattan Heights", "East Manhattan Beach" (Manhattan Village, Manhattan Heights, Liberty Village), "The Poet's Section" (Shelley, Tennyson, Longfellow, Keats), and "El Porto" (North Manhattan Beach). The Roth Tract, between Herrin and Peck, is sometimes referred to as the "Bird Section."

The "Hill Section" is known for its high-priced homes; many of the residences are remodeled or newly constructed. The steep hills allow panoramic ocean and city views.

The "Sand Section" has quiet walk-street neighborhoods adjacent to the ocean. Oceanfront homes stretch along the bike path and walking lane of "The Strand". "The Strand" section of Manhattan Beach includes some of the most expensive real estate per square foot in the United States.

Since 2010, new property developments in Manhattan Beach cannot exceed two lot parcels. Size and appearance restrictions were enacted by the Manhattan Beach City Council to preserve the appearance of the beachfront community after three lots were joined to create a 16,000-square-foot (1,500 m^{2}) oceanside home in 2008.

==== Downtown ====
"Downtown" Manhattan Beach is considered the heart of the city. The area runs along Manhattan Beach Boulevard and the streets perpendicular to the Manhattan Beach Pier and Valley Drive. There are Zagat-rated casual fine-dining restaurants, specialty boutiques and retailers that create a pedestrian-friendly, mixed-use downtown center. The Metlox site, where the pottery factory once stood for decades, was closed in the early 1990s and redeveloped into a mixed-use center. The Metlox site includes a luxury boutique hotel, spa, restaurants, shops and underground parking.

==== North Manhattan Beach District ====
The North Manhattan Beach business district is located near the intersection of Rosecrans and Highland and has restaurants and shops. The district is defined as covering "32nd Street to 45th Street and consist[s] of over 80 businesses".

==== Rosecrans Corridor ====
The Rosecrans corridor is located on the south side of Rosecrans Avenue, east of Sepulveda, and west of Aviation.

The Manhattan Beach Country Club, the Westdrift Manhattan Beach Hotel and Golf Course, retail stores, restaurants, supermarkets, multi-story office buildings, and shopping centers border the Rosecrans corridor between Sepulveda and Aviation Boulevards. The Rosecrans corridor is adjacent to The Point and Plaza El Segundo off Sepulveda Blvd, which features additional retailers.

==== Sepulveda Corridor ====
The Sepulveda Corridor occupies the commercial zone and is the city's main north–south highway. The area includes the Manhattan Village Mall, which is located east of Sepulveda Boulevard between Marine and Rosecrans Avenues. The mall, built in the early 1980s, was remodeled in the late 1990s and early 2000s. The Manhattan Village Mall is executing a multimillion-dollar redevelopment that adds both outdoor and enclosed retail and restaurant space. There are several medium-sized hotels, large automobile dealerships, automotive repair shops, restaurants, multi-story office buildings, medical buildings, pharmacies, banks, and small shopping centers along this corridor. Kaiser Permanente's medical offices include a laboratory and pharmacy.

==== Aviation Corridor ====
The Aviation Corridor is located along Aviation Boulevard (the city's eastern boundary), south of Rosecrans Avenue, and north of Marine Avenue. Aviation High School was located at the intersection of Manhattan Beach Boulevard and Aviation until it closed in the early 1980s. The zone includes several major entertainment and aerospace complexes, including the Manhattan Beach Studios Media Campus and the Northrop Grumman Space Park Complex. Manhattan Beach Media Campus has production for movies and entertainment including the Marvel Studios motion pictures Thor (2011) and Iron Man 2 (2010) and both sequels to James Cameron's Avatar movie. The studio complex has large photovoltaic solar panel rooftop installations in the area which generates approximately 1 megawatt of power.

== Demographics ==
Historical population
Census	Pop.	Note	%±
1920	859		—
1930	1,891		120.1%
1940	6,398		238.3%
1950	17,330		170.9%
1960	33,934		95.8%
1970	35,352		4.2%
1980	31,542		−10.8%
1990	32,063		1.7%
2000	33,852		5.6%
2010	35,135		3.8%
2020	35,506		1.1%
U.S. Decennial Census; 1860–1870 1880-1890; 1900 1910 1920; 1930 1940 1950; 1960 1970 1980; 1990 2000 2010; 2020

Manhattan Beach first appeared as a city in the 1920 U.S. census as part of the now defunct Redondo Township.

=== Racial and ethnic composition ===
Manhattan Beach city, California – Racial and ethnic composition Note: the US Census treats Hispanic/Latino as an ethnic category. This table excludes Latinos from the racial categories and assigns them to a separate category. Hispanics/Latinos may be of any race.
Race / Ethnicity (NH = Non-Hispanic)	Pop 1980	Pop 1990	Pop 2000	Pop 2010	Pop 2020	% 1980	% 1990	% 2000	% 2010	% 2020
White alone (NH)	29,261	28,730	28,913	27,873	25,353	92.77%	89.60%	85.41%	79.33%	71.40%
Black or African American alone (NH)	78	198	206	282	305	0.25%	0.62%	0.61%	0.80%	0.86%
Native American or Alaska Native alone (NH)	140	78	46	44	28	0.44%	0.24%	0.14%	0.13%	0.08%
Asian alone (NH)	672	1,388	2,031	2,992	3,995	2.13%	4.33%	6.00%	8.52%	11.25%
Native Hawaiian or Pacific Islander alone (NH)	672	1,388	37	44	29	2.13%	4.33%	0.11%	0.13%	0.08%
Other race alone (NH)	28	24	79	84	240	0.09%	0.07%	0.23%	0.24%	0.68%
Mixed race or Multiracial (NH)	x	x	784	1,376	2,484	x	x	2.32%	3.92%	7.00%
Hispanic or Latino (any race)	1,363	1,645	1,756	2,440	3,072	4.32%	5.13%	5.19%	6.94%	8.65%
Total	31,542	32,063	33,852	35,135	35,506	100.00%	100.00%	100.00%	100.00%	100.00%

=== 2020 census ===
As of the 2020 census, Manhattan Beach had a population of 35,506 and a population density of 9,025.4 inhabitants per square mile (3,484.7/km^{2}). The age distribution was 23.2% under the age of 18, 7.2% aged 18 to 24, 21.4% aged 25 to 44, 30.4% aged 45 to 64, and 17.8% who were 65 years of age or older. The median age was 43.7 years. For every 100 females, there were 96.8 males, and for every 100 females age 18 and over there were 94.7 males.

The census reported that 99.9% of the population lived in households, 0.1% lived in non-institutionalized group quarters, and no one was institutionalized. 100.0% of residents lived in urban areas, while 0.0% lived in rural areas.

There were 13,808 households, of which 33.4% had children under the age of 18 living in them. Of all households, 56.8% were married-couple households, 5.3% were cohabiting couple households, 15.8% were households with a male householder and no spouse or partner present, and 22.1% were households with a female householder and no spouse or partner present. About 24.3% of all households were one-person households, and 9.8% had someone living alone who was 65 years of age or older. The average household size was 2.57. There were 9,481 families (68.7% of all households).

There were 14,994 housing units at an average density of 3,811.4 units per square mile (1,471.6 units/km^{2}), of which 13,808 (92.1%) were occupied and 7.9% were vacant. The homeowner vacancy rate was 1.1% and the rental vacancy rate was 6.0%. Of occupied units, 67.3% were owner-occupied and 32.7% were occupied by renters.

=== 2023 ACS estimates ===
In 2023, the US Census Bureau estimated that the median household income was $193,904, and the per capita income was $113,441. About 2.9% of families and 3.6% of the population were below the poverty line.

=== 2010 census ===
The 2010 United States census reported that Manhattan Beach had a population of 35,135. The population density was 8,914.7 inhabitants per square mile (3,442.0/km^{2}). The racial makeup of Manhattan Beach was 29,686 (84.5%) White (79.3% Non-Hispanic White), 290 (0.8%) Black or African American (U.S. Census), 59 (0.2%) Native American, 3,023 (8.6%) Asian, 49 (0.1%) Pacific Islander, 409 (1.2%) from other races, and 1,619 (4.6%) from two or more races. There were 2,440 people of Hispanic or Latino origin, of any race (6.9%).

The Census reported that 35,107 people (99.9% of the population) lived in households, 28 (0.1%) lived in non-institutionalized group quarters, and 0 (0%) were institutionalized.

There were 14,038 households, out of which 4,735 (33.7%) had children under the age of 18 living in them, 7,583 (54.0%) were opposite-sex married couples living together, 892 (6.4%) had a female householder with no husband present, and 438 (3.1%) had a male householder with no wife present. There were 695 (5.0%) unmarried opposite-sex partnerships, and 85 (0.6%) same-sex married couples or partnerships. 3,627 households (25.8%) were made up of individuals, and 1,078 (7.7%) had someone living alone who was 65 years of age or older. The average household size was 2.50. There were 8,913 families (63.5% of all households); the average family size was 3.10.

There were 8,725 people (24.8%) under the age of 18, 1,740 people (5.0%) aged 18 to 24, 9,532 people (27.1%) aged 25 to 44, 10,681 people (30.4%) aged 45 to 64, and 4,457 people (12.7%) who were 65 years of age or older. The median age was 40.9 years. For every 100 females, there were 100.4 males. For every 100 females age 18 and over, there were 99.2 males. There were 14,929 housing units at an average density of 3,787.9 units per square mile (1,462.5 units/km^{2}), of which 9,420 (67.1%) were owner-occupied, and 4,618 (32.9%) were occupied by renters. The homeowner vacancy rate was 0.8%; the rental vacancy rate was 5.3%. 25,587 people (72.8% of the population) lived in owner-occupied housing units and 9,520 people (27.1%) lived in rental housing units.

According to the 2010 United States census, Manhattan Beach had a median household income of $139,259, with 3.4% of the population living below the federal poverty line.

Many high-profile individuals in the sports and entertainment industry live in Manhattan Beach due to its oceanfront desirability, top-performing school district, and commuting distance to Los Angeles.

According to Mapping L.A., German and English were the most common ancestries in 2000. Canada and the United Kingdom were the most common foreign places of birth.

== Economy ==
According to the city's 2024 Comprehensive Annual Financial Report, the top employers in the city are:

#	Employer	# of Employees
1	Northrop Grumman	3000
2	Skechers	1221
3	Kinecta Federal Credit Union	550
4	Target	405
5	Westdrift Hotel	233
6	Ralphs	167
7	Bristol Farms	129

Residential prices in Manhattan Beach are among the highest in the state of California. In 2013, the Dataquick study reported that more homes exceeding $1 million were sold in Manhattan Beach than any other city in California. Pacific Palisades, Beverly Hills, La Jolla, Malibu, Bel-Air, Orinda, Atherton, Montecito, and other high-end cities in California ranked behind Manhattan Beach. The Higley 100 Census survey found that the Hill Section of Manhattan Beach is the second-highest mean household income neighborhood in Los Angeles County, with Beverly Park ranking first and Beverly Hills (the 90210 section) ranking third, respectively. The current median residential home price is $2.2 million according to a November 23, 2014, Los Angeles Times article, and land values in Manhattan Beach rank among the highest per square foot in the nation. Land values on the Manhattan Beach "Strand" are routinely around $10 million for a 3,000-square-foot (280 m^{2}) piece of land.

== Parks and recreation ==
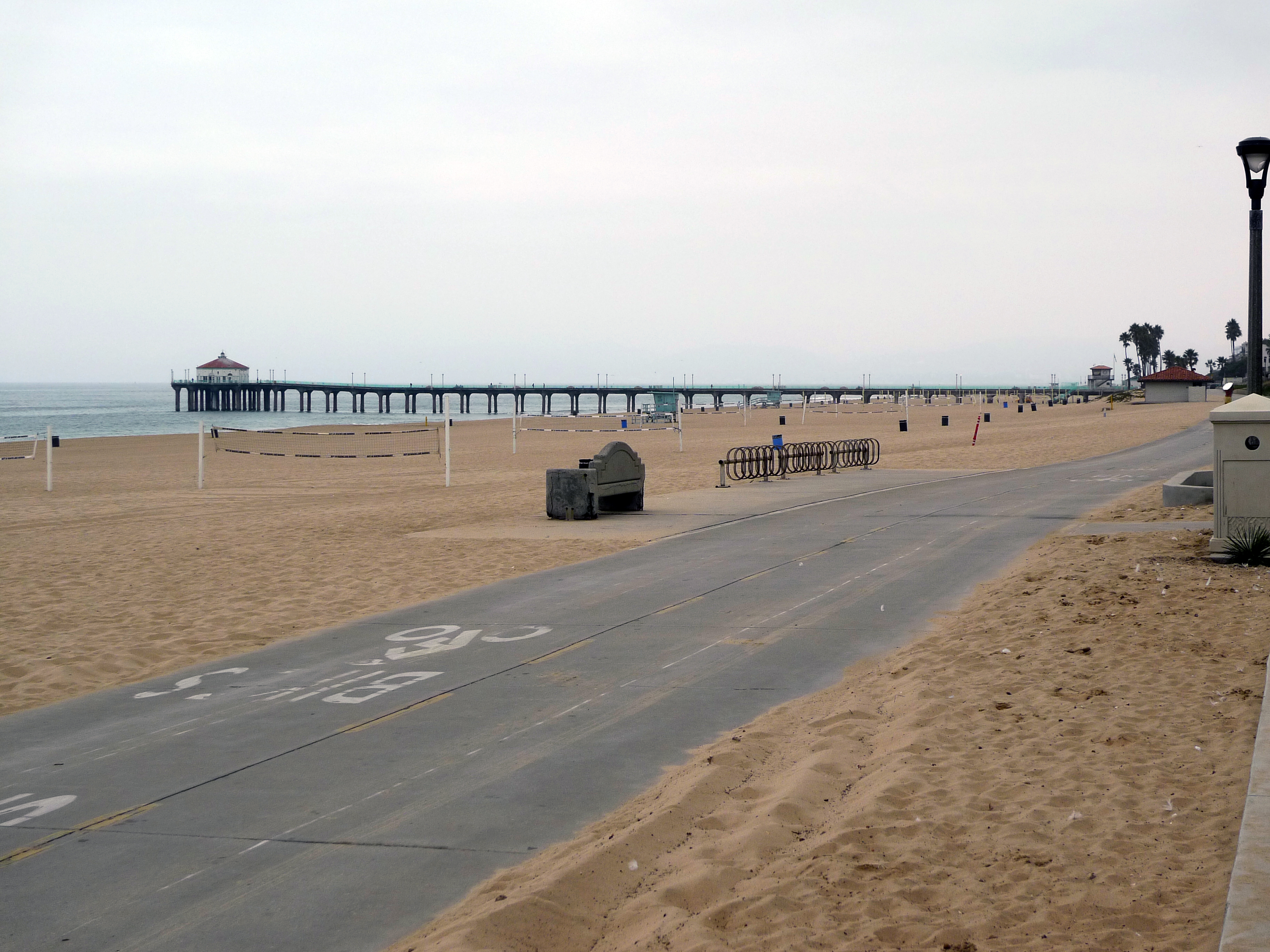
Manhattan Beach pier and concrete bike path

The wide sandy beaches attract over 3.8 million visitors annually. Beach volleyball, swimming, bodyboarding and surfing are popular activities among residents and visitors. Popular surf spots include the pier and El Porto, the northern end of the beach. Lifeguard stations are located along the entire length of the beach and the beach is cleaned and groomed daily by crews from LA County Beaches and Harbors Department. Along the Strand at the eastern edge of the beach is a concrete bike path for bicycles. The bikeway extends north to Santa Monica and south to Torrance. A separate 2.1-mile (3.4 km) pedestrian walkway runs alongside the bike path. Restrooms and shower facilities are provided adjacent to the Strand paths. An area known as Veteran's Parkway is a pedestrian walkway that runs adjacent to Valley Drive and Ardmore Avenue near downtown Manhattan Beach. Nearly 20 acres (8.1 ha) and 3 miles (4.8 km) long and extending into Hermosa Beach, the wood-chip walkway is a popular trail for runners and dog-walkers.

Polliwog Park is the largest and most popular park. Located on Manhattan Beach Boulevard, two blocks west of Aviation Boulevard, Polliwog Park includes the Manhattan Beach Botanical Garden, as well as a small lake, open-air concert amphitheater, playground equipment, picnic tables, restrooms, and a fenced dog exercise area. It is also the site of the Manhattan Beach Historical Society Red Cottage, which is home to the city's collection of historical artifacts. Marine Avenue Park, west of Aviation Boulevard on Marine, has several lighted ball fields, basketball courts, and an indoor racquetball facility. A small skate park was added to Marine Avenue Park in 2017 after a 16-year battle over its location. Live Oak Park in the downtown area has ball fields, batting cages, playground equipment, basketball courts, tennis courts, and picnic tables. Additionally, Begg pool offers comprehensive swimming programs year-round for both adults and children, including instruction, recreational swimming, water aerobics, and even a youth swim team and adult swim club. Bruce's Beach (formerly Culiacan Park) is north of downtown.

For over 50 years, the city of Manhattan Beach hosts an annual Hometown Fair at Live Oak Park in downtown Manhattan Beach. Popular among community residents, the fair features food and drink, live music, games and booths to raise funds for local causes.

== Government ==
=== Local government ===
The city of Manhattan Beach is governed by a five-member City Council. City Council members are elected every four years. The office of the Mayor of Manhattan Beach rotates every nine months among the members of the City Council, so that each City Council member serves one term as Mayor. A City Manager is appointed by the City Council. An elected City Treasurer serves a four-year term.

The Beach Cities Health District, provides health and wellness services to the residents of Hermosa Beach, Manhattan Beach, and Redondo Beach. It is funded partially by over $3 million annually from property taxes. The voters of the three beach cities elect the 5-member Board of Directors to four-year terms. One of 78 California Health Districts, it was created in 1955 as South Bay Hospital, which no longer exists, and took on its current name in 1993. Beach Cities Health District is now focused on real estate development and opened AdventurePlex, a Manhattan Beach fitness center for kids and their families, in 2002. Filled with mazes, tunnels, outdoor rock climbing walls, complex ropes courses, and an indoor gym, AdventurePlex challenges children physically and intellectually in health-focused recreational activities.

=== County government ===
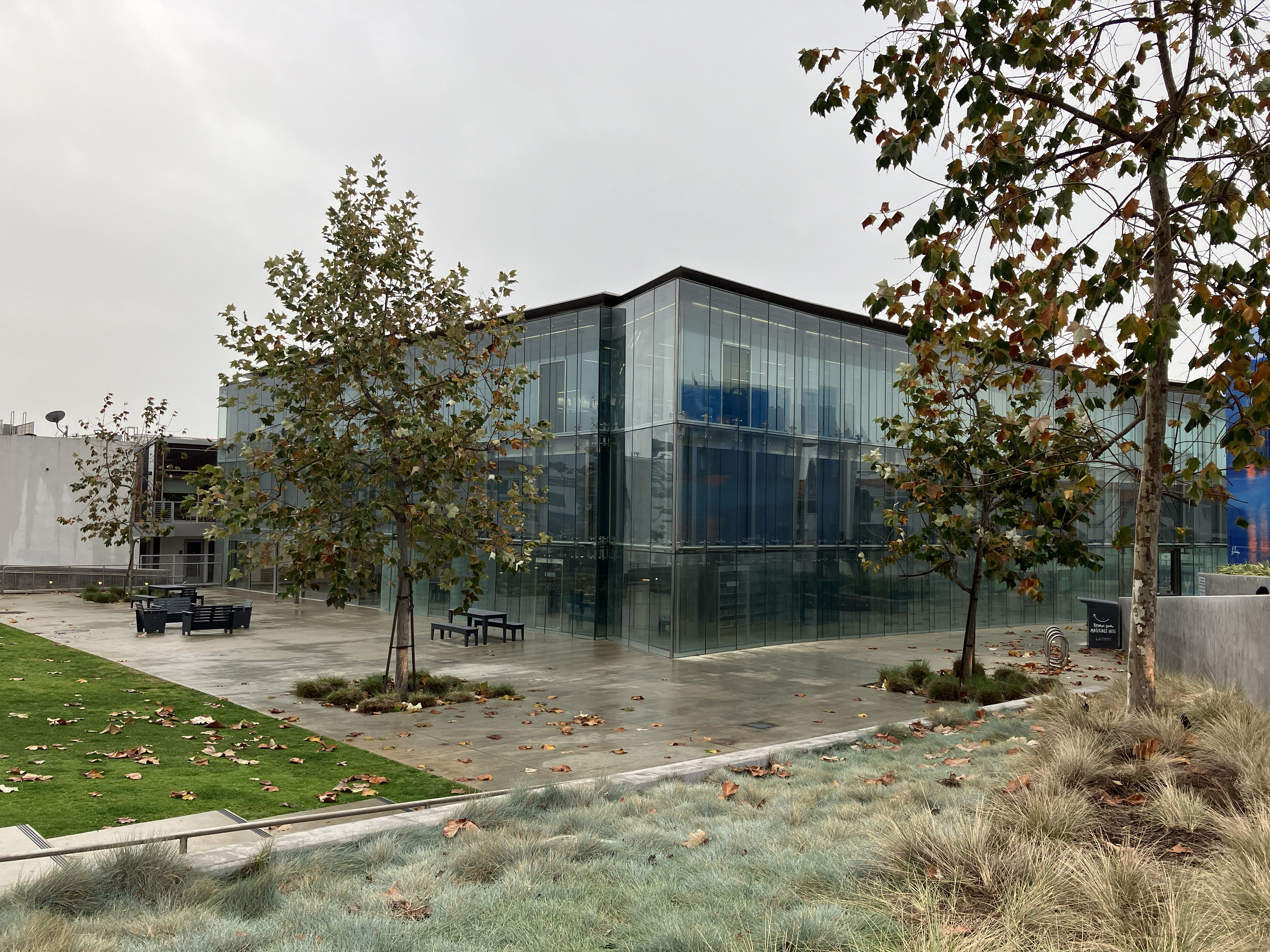
Manhattan Beach Library

Manhattan Beach is in the Second Supervisorial District of Los Angeles County. Holly Mitchell is the District Supervisor. The county collects taxes on properties in Manhattan Beach and maintains property assessment rolls. Los Angeles County maintains the beach and provides daily cleaning and grooming. The county also maintains the bike path at the eastern edge of the beach.

The Manhattan Beach County Library is located downtown on Highland Avenue, two blocks north of Manhattan Beach Boulevard. The library is part of the County of Los Angeles Public Library system, and includes Internet-accessible computers, WiFi, and access to the six million items in the county library collection. The new $19 million, 20,000-square-foot, two-story facility featuring a glass exterior was completed in 2015.

=== State legislators ===
In the California State Legislature, Manhattan Beach is in the 24th senatorial district, represented by Democrat Ben Allen, and in the 66th Assembly district, represented by Democrat Al Muratsuchi.

=== Federal government ===
In the United States House of Representatives, Manhattan Beach is in California's 36th congressional district, represented by Democrat Ted Lieu.

== Education ==
According to US Census data, Manhattan Beach holds the ranking as the second most educated city in Los Angeles County and the fifth most educated city in the state of California.

=== Primary and secondary schools ===
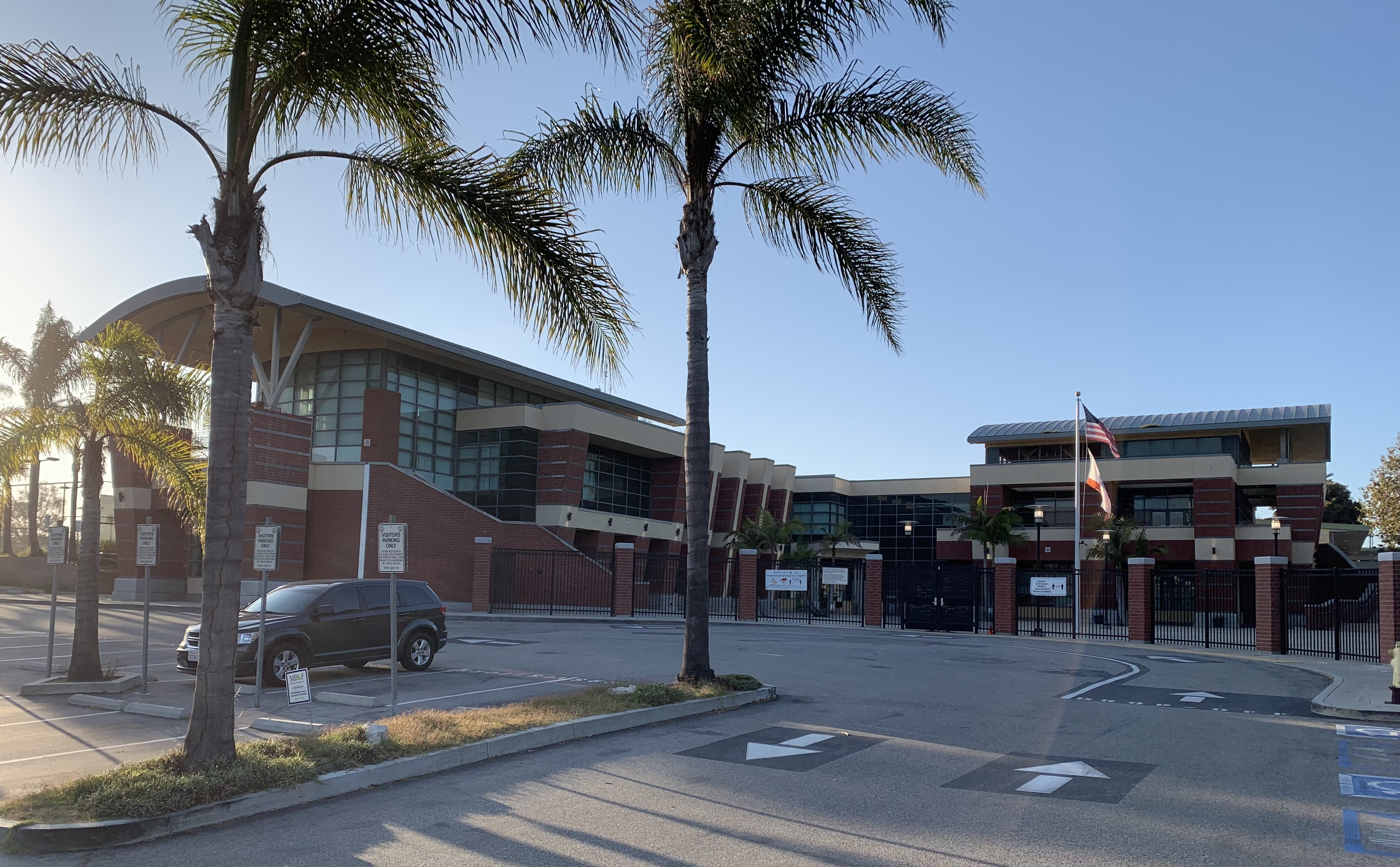
Mira Costa High School

School	2010 API Score
Grandview Elementary	957
Meadows Elementary	946
Pacific Elementary	960
Pennekamp Elementary	948
Robinson Elementary	962
Manhattan Beach Middle	945
Mira Costa High School	911

Public education in Manhattan Beach is provided by the Manhattan Beach Unified School District. It is ranked as the third-best performing school district in the state of California. The district received a score of 926 on the 2010 California Academic Performance Index. Each individual school also ranks at the top of its respective category. Manhattan Beach is currently ranked as one of the best suburbs in Los Angeles County for its high-earning and well-educated residents.

Manhattan Beach's top performing school district is currently ranked as the third best in the state of California, behind only Palo Alto and South Pasadena. and Forbes Magazine ranked the city's school district, MBUSD, as the sixth best school district in the United States.

Private schools located in Manhattan Beach include American Martyrs Catholic School (of the Roman Catholic Archdiocese of Los Angeles), Manhattan Academy, Montessori School of Manhattan Beach and Journey of Faith Christian School.

Residents of Manhattan Beach were in the Wiseburn School District until 1913, when the Manhattan Beach elementary school district formed. Residents attended Redondo Union High School until 1950, when Mira Costa High School opened. Residents were within, in addition to the elementary district, the South Bay Union High School District until 1993, when the latter dissolved. MBUSD formed in 1993.

== Media ==
Manhattan Beach is served by Easy Reader-Manhattan Beach, Beach Magazine, the Daily Breeze, the Los Angeles Times, and the Beach Reporter.

== Arts and culture ==
=== Manhattan Beach Library ===
The Manhattan Beach Library started as a subscription library in 1910 by the Neptunian Women's Club of Manhattan Beach. The library became part of LA County Library in January 1915. The LA County Library was founded in 1912 and is one of the largest library systems in the US. It offers public resources such as books, music, multimedia materials, computer and internet access, and educational and recreational services to 3.4 million residents across 3,000 square miles through its 87 libraries. The Manhattan Beach Library moved into a separate building in 1957 and to its current location in 1975, located at 1320 Highland Ave. In 2013, construction began for the modern building. On May 1, 2015, the 21,500-square-foot building designed by architectural firm Johnson Favaro opened. It is a two-story modern design with panoramic ocean views, an interactive children's exhibit, fireplace, automated materials handling system, and self-check machines.

=== Concerts in the park ===
The Manhattan Beach Concerts in the Park is an annual summer event held at Polliwog Park on Sundays from 5:00 PM to 7:00 PM. The concerts are held between the months of July through September. Concerts in the Park is a free event where attendees bring their own blankets, lawn chairs, and picnics to listen to live music at the amphitheater in Polliwog Park. There are submissions for bands to play in the concert and the full lineup is posted a few months prior.

=== Manhattan Beach Hometown Fair ===
The Manhattan Beach Hometown Fair began in 1972 and was started by a group of residents. The fair included a parade along Manhattan Beach Blvd, and then turning North on Valley Drive. The parade included the Mira Costa High School band and local craft booths and non-profit food and game booths. After the first year, a standing committee was created to organize the fair under guidance from the city. The fair was incorporated on April 12. 1977 as a California Non-Profit Organization. Some features of the fair include local artists displaying their work, performances from bands, Kid Country, which includes petting zoos and pony rides, arts and crafts area, food and game booths, and a beer and wine garden. The Manhattan Beach Hometown Fair is created by an all-volunteer board.

=== Utility Box Beautification Program ===
The Utility Box Beautification Project is a public art program that transforms traffic control utility boxes around Manhattan Beach streets into works of art. This program is under the direction og City Council and is supervised and facilitated by the Cultural Arts Commission and City staff.

=== Sculpture Garden Program ===
The Sculpture Garden Program began in 2009 as a temporary outdoor exhibition. The goals of the program are to enhance the city with a variety of unique original artwork from different artists and fit the criteria of the Public Art Master Plan. This program is supported by the City's Public Arts Fund, which is funded by a 1% development fee and does not impact the general fund.

=== Light Gate (Centennial Art Project) ===
Light Gate is located at the top of 14th Street, between City Hall and the library on Highland Ave. The artwork is made of glass, laminated with prismatic lighting film that creates varied light effects with the sun.

=== Strand Alcove Bench Program ===
The Strand Alcove Bench Program was created to make the bench alcoves along the strand a place to rest and sit at the beach. Council chose an environmentally sustainable material to be used for the benches. The program has now been discontinued and no new strand alcove benches will be created.

== In popular culture ==
Manhattan Beach, California is a filming location for a variety of films, television shows, and music videos throughout the years. The surf spot, El Porto Waves, is featured in 1408 (2007) when John Cusack's character surfs in El Porto Waves. In 2012 (2009), cracks appear down the middle of 45th Street. The 1983 Taylor Hackford film Against All Odds was filmed along The Strand and on the beach. In Blow (2001) film, George Jung is a former Manhattan Beach cocaine smuggler. The CBS series CSI: Miami, at Manhattan Beach Studios, had an episode filmed at Polliwog Park. The TV show Hannah Montana used Mira Costa High School as the image of the school portrayed in the TV show, and the Manhattan Beach Pier was also commonly shown in the intro of the show. The closing scene of Indictment: The McMartin Trial (1995) was filmed on Manhattan Beach Pier. In the movie Jerry Maguire (1996), Dorothy's (Renée Zellweger) house is in the Gas Lamp Section on 23rd Street. The Fox Network series The O.C. was filmed at Manhattan Beach Studios. The scenes set inside Governor Swan's mansion in Pirates of the Caribbean: Curse of the Black Pearl was shot in Manhattan Beach. In the movie Point Break (1991), Keanu Reeves buys his surfboard from a shop located on the Manhattan Beach pier. In the movie Starsky and Hutch (2004), Starsky (Ben Stiller) can be seen stretching under the pier. In Tequila Sunrise (1988) Mel Gibson's character lives on the beach near the pier. The CW Television Network series Veronica Mars. The TV show Weeds filmed the Ren Mar House scenes at 124 Eighth Street, Manhattan Beach. The movie Airborne filmed beach and pier scenes in Manhattan Beach. The video for the song "White Walls" by Macklemore was filmed in Manhattan Beach. The movie Mac & Devin Go to High School filmed scenes at Mira Costa High School and scenes from the music video "Young, Wild & Free" by Snoop Dogg and Wiz Khalifa. Manhattan Beach is mentioned in the song "Surfin' U.S.A." by the Beach Boys. Group members were from the adjacent city of Hawthorne. The Manhattan Beach Open volleyball tournament in Manhattan Beach is known as "The Championships, Wimbledon of Beach Volleyball." The names of the tournament champions are inscribed on plaques along Manhattan Beach Pier. This event usually takes place in August and airs on national TV.

== Notable people ==
See: List of people from Manhattan Beach, California

== Public transportation ==
Manhattan Beach is served by Beach Cities Transit. The Douglas and Redondo Beach K Line stations are nearby, though outside the city.

Historically, Manhattan Beach was served by the Pacific Electric streetcar system.
