= Iver's =

Iver's was a department store with two locations north of Downtown Los Angeles: one at 5801 North Figueroa Street in Highland Park, Los Angeles, and another at 663 Foothill Boulevard in La Cañada Flintridge.

The La Cañada Flintridge branch, which measured 40,000 square feet (3,700 m^{2}) and had sales of $5 million (~$11.8 million in 2023) per year, was sold to Buffums in 1986. The location is now a TJ Maxx.

In Highland Park the Iver's store was the heart of the commercial strip (Figueroa Street around the present-day Gold Line light rail station) from 1913 through 1984 when it closed.

The chain was founded by Catherine and Jesse William Ivers as a notions and ribbons store.
