= Robertson's Hams =

American food company

Robertson's Hams is a food company in the United States that was founded in 1946 by V.B. "Tup" Robertson in Marietta, Oklahoma. Robertson's Hams first opened in downtown Marietta and later located their main plant near I-35 in Marietta. Robertson's is known for its sugar-cured and hickory smoked line of meat products. The family owned meat business has franchise locations throughout Texas and Oklahoma.

== Products ==
- Real Beef Jerky
- Smoked Hams
- Smoked Sausage
- Smoked bacon
- Smoked Cheese
- Smoked Turkeys

== Locations ==
I-35 at Marietta, OK; I-20, Exit 307 at Baird, TX; I-35 at Salado, TX; I-20 at Wills Point, TX; I-40 North of Seminole, OK
