= The Bon Marché (Lowell) =

Coordinates: 42°38′45″N 71°18′37.4″W

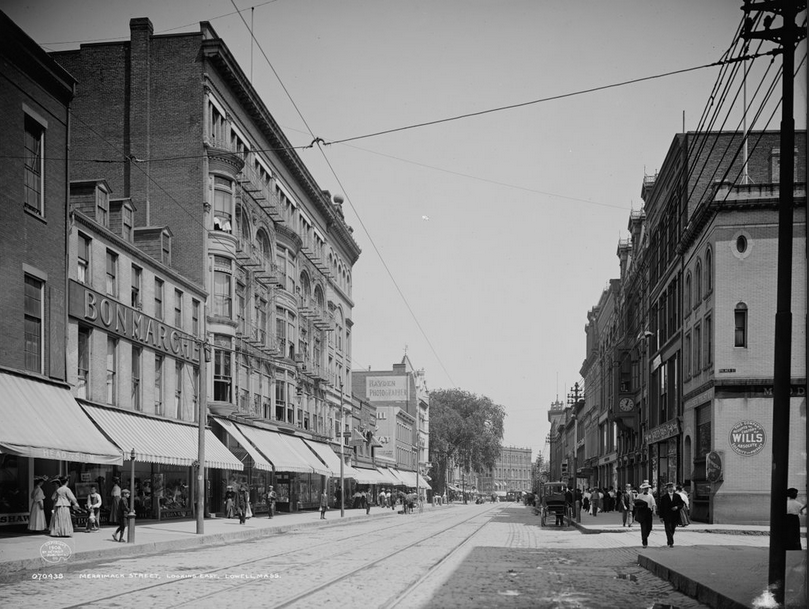
Merrimack Street around 1908. Bon Marché is the large building on the left. The small building next to it with the large Bon Marché sign is an annex, which was later torn down to accommodate the 1927 addition.

The Bon Marché was a department store in downtown Lowell, Massachusetts, in business from 1878 to 1976.

Frederic Mitchell founded a dry goods store in 1878 under the name "This is Mitchell's". His brother Charles Mitchell operated a shoe store. Both stores were on Merrimack Street. In 1887, Frederick and Charles combined their operation, under the name The Bon Marché.

Of the building that became the Bon Marché store, the small righthand section was built around 1874 (before Bon Marché existed). The large central section was built in 1887 to house the new Bon Marché Dry Goods store. The addition on the left side (matching the original right side building) was built in 1927.

In the manner of the day, wares were sold outside on the street. Customers included the workers of the city's many textile mills. The store was on Merrimack Street in the heart of the commercial district of what was then the prosperous and growing city of Lowell.

Even in its early days, Bon Marché billed itself as the largest department store in New England. Their Rock Bottom Basement Store featured an actual rock, a large glacial erratic which the basement was built around. The store was an anchor of Lowell's mercantile downtown. Its fortunes declined with the city as the mills closed. The last day of business was January 10, 1976. The building was taken over by the Jordan Marsh chain, which itself became defunct in 1996; the building the now housed the UMass Lowell bookstore and other businesses. As of recent, the building serves home to the Lowell Public School office, as well as Community Teamwork offices.
