= Robertson Company =

Department store in Hollywood, Los Angeles, California

- Type: Department store
- Industry: Retail
- Founded: 1923
- Founder: Cromwell, Robertson & Swift (C.R.S.)
- Defunct: 1942
- Fate: Acquired by J.C. Penney
- Headquarters: Hollywood Boulevard, Hollywood, Los Angeles, California, United States
- Number of locations: 1
- Area served: Hollywood and Greater Los Angeles
- Products: General merchandise

Robertson Company also known as Robertson's department store and originally C.R.S. (for Cromwell, Robertson & Swift) was the first department store in Hollywood, Los Angeles, United States, opened as Hollywood Boulevard became a major regional shopping district starting in the 1920s, second only to Broadway (the street) in Downtown Los Angeles.

The independent department store, at 46,000 square feet (4,300 m^{2}) and 4 stories tall, opened in 1923 at 6751-6753 Hollywood Boulevard; the buildings are still standing and in use as a Museum of Illusions.

It had 43 departments, a first floor finished in marble, and two high-speed elevators. It held an elegant fashion show the likes of which Hollywood had not yet seen. From 1931 the store faced competition from the much larger Broadway Hollywood at Hollywood and Vine. During the 1920s the Boulevard became an upscale shopping district patronized by both affluent clients and the movie studios nearby. The area would later face competition from areas along Wilshire Boulevard: one around Bullocks Wilshire which opened in 1929, secondly the Miracle Mile, and later, Beverly Hills. The store closed and J. C. Penney took over the location in 1942.
