= F. and W. Grand Silver Store Building =

Building in Los Angeles, California

- U.S. Historic district – Contributing property
- Los Angeles Historic-Cultural Monument
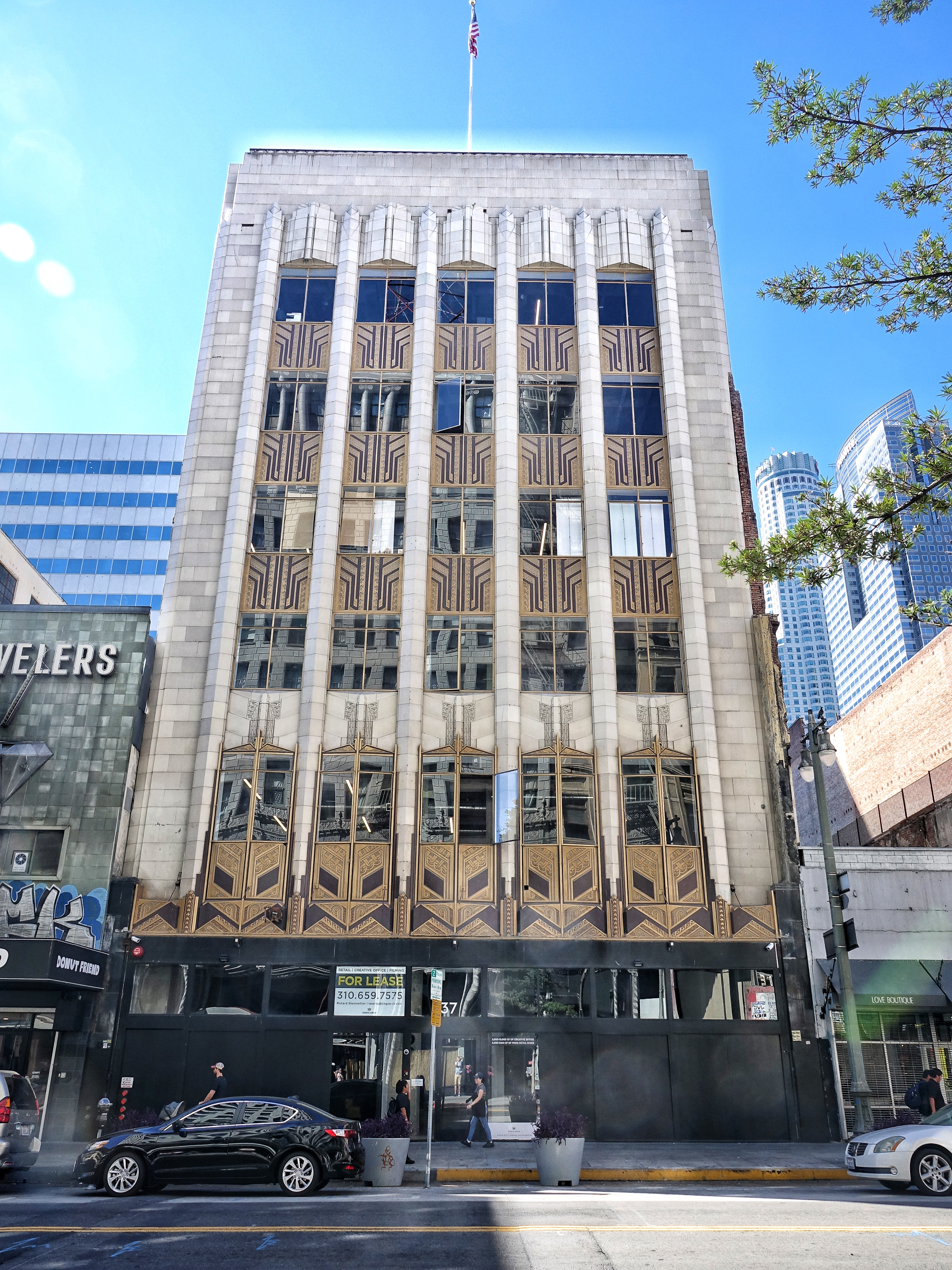
- The building in 2014

- Location within the Los Angeles metropolitan area
- Location: 537 S. Broadway, Los Angeles, California
- Coordinates: 34°02′51″N 118°15′07″W
- Built: 1931
- Architect: Walker & Eisen
- Architectural style: Art Deco
- Part of: Broadway Theater and Commercial District (ID79000484)
- LAHCM No.: 1155

Significant dates
- Designated CP: May 9, 1979
- Designated LAHCM: February 27, 2018

F. and W. Grand Silver Store Building, also known as Hartfields, is a historic six-story building located at 537 S. Broadway in the Jewelry District and Broadway Theater District in the historic core of downtown Los Angeles.

== History ==
F. and W. Grand Silver Store Building, built in 1931 on the former site of the Milton Hotel, was designed by Walker & Eisen, the architecture firm known for many buildings on Broadway, including the Silverwood's, Apparel Center, and Platt buildings. This building was home to a F. & W. Grand-Silver Stores from 1931 to 1934, then to a series of department stores, most notably Hartfield's around the middle of the century. The first floor was altered, demolished, and rebuilt five times during this time, and the interior was remodeled multiple times between 1934 and 2009.

In 1979, the Broadway Theater and Commercial District was added to the National Register of Historic Places, with this building listed as a contributing property in the district. In 2018, the building was listed as Los Angeles Historic Cultural Monument No. 1155. It is also listed in the California Register of Historical Resources.

In 2009, the building's second through sixth story façade was repaired and restored to its original form. In 2015, real-estate developer King Arch bought the building for $7.35 million ($9.98 million in 2025), then further restored it and converted its interior to offices.

== Architecture and design ==
F. and W. Grand Silver Store Building is rectangular in plan and made of brick and concrete with a terra cotta facade and a flat roof. According to the City of Los Angeles, the building is "an excellent example of a commercial building in the Art Deco architectural style." Elements of the style featured in the building include a vertical emphasis, metal casement and fixed windows, smooth walls, and ornamentation that include zigzags, chevrons, and other stylized geometric motifs.

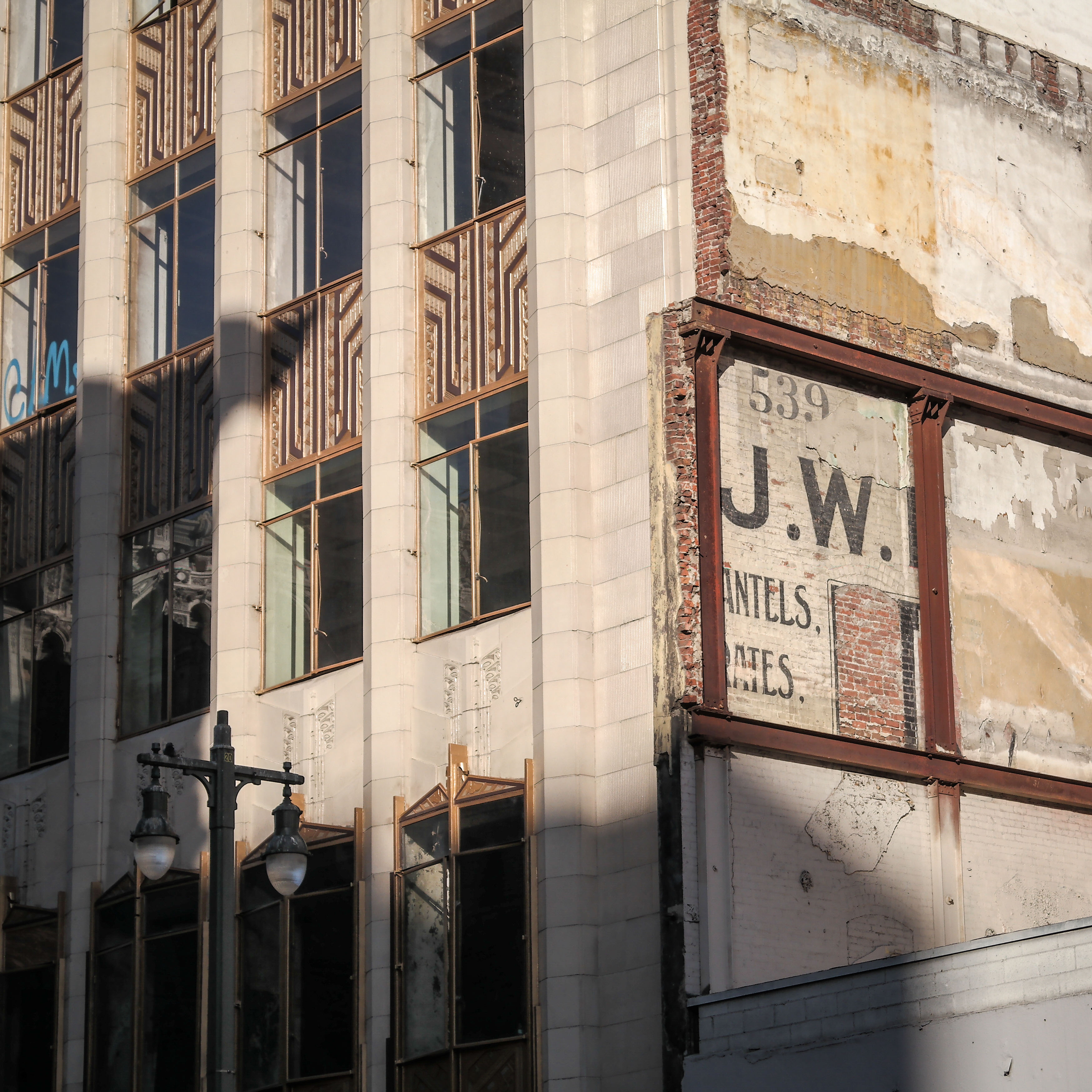
The front and north side of the building, 2014

The front of the building, which faces east, is divided into five vertical sections by banded pilasters that start as tiered points at the second floor and continue to the sixth. Between the pilasters are vertical brass-colored metal single light casement windows topped with transom windows. These windows are separated by decorative brass-colored bands of spandrel panels below all but the third floor. Decorative terra cotta panels feature below the third and above the sixth floor, and continue to the parapet. The second floor windows extend slightly out in the center, creating triangular bay windows. They also feature stylized, brass-colored broken pediments and spikes that extend to the terra cotta panels above. A horizontal beam separates the first floor storefront from the spandrel below the second floor, and the first floor itself consists entirely of floor-to-ceiling glazing.

The sides of the building consist of brick infill with bearing walls and visible floor plates. The rear, which is the site of several rooftop utility penthouses, is only three stories in height, despite the rest of the building being six. Most of the original interior has been removed; all that remains is the terrazzo ground-floor and remnants of tile-covered walls.

Integrity of the building is considered high, this despite it undergoing numerous interior and exterior alterations.

== See also ==
- List of contributing properties in the Broadway Theater and Commercial District
- List of Los Angeles Historic-Cultural Monuments in Downtown Los Angeles
