= Regal Shoes Building =

Building in Los Angeles, California, U.S.

- Regal Shoes
- U.S. Historic district – Contributing property
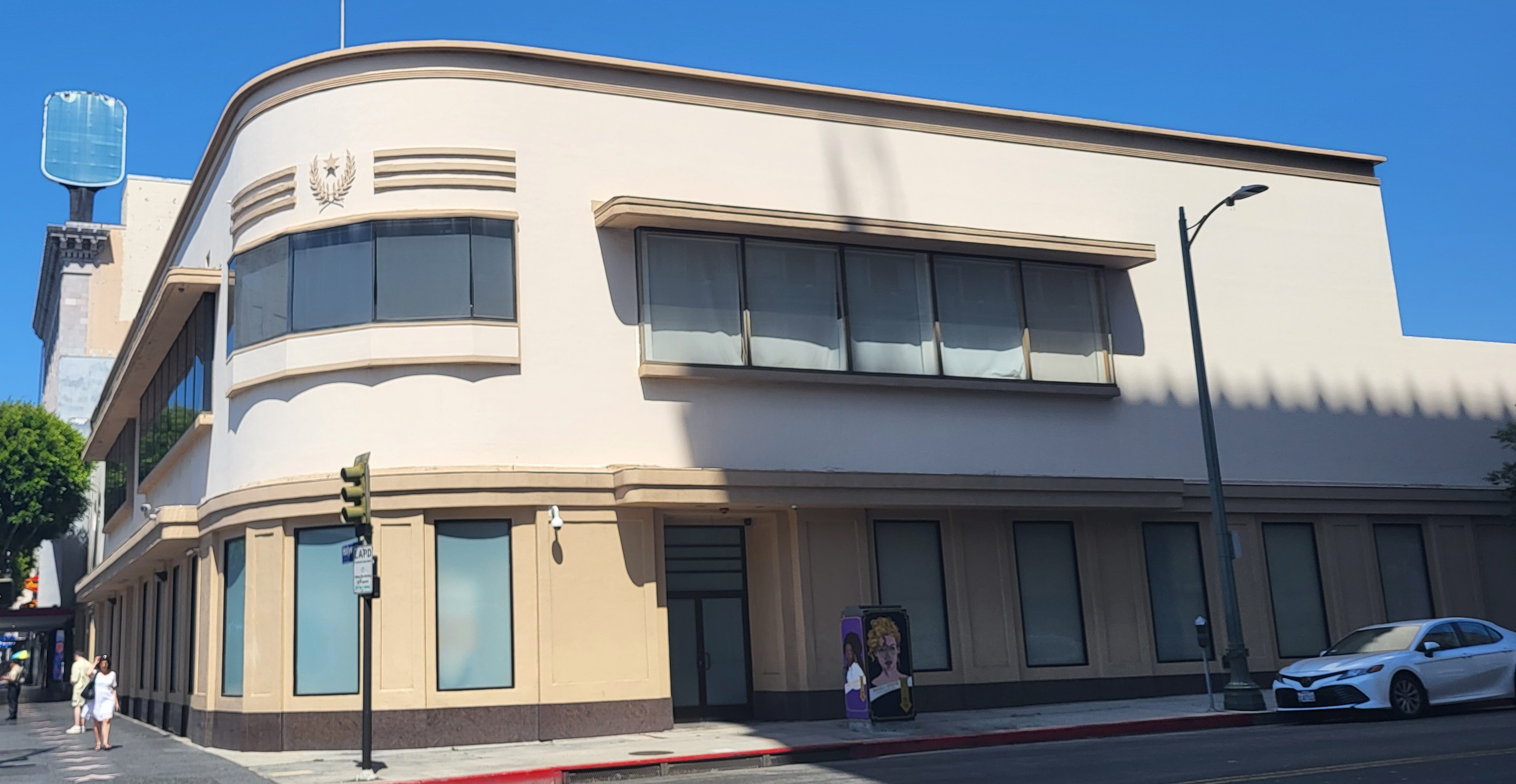
- The building in 2024

- Location within the Los Angeles metropolitan area
- Location: 6349 W. Hollywood Blvd., Hollywood, California
- Coordinates: 34.1022°N 118.3285°W
- Built: 1939
- Architect: Walker & Eisen
- Architectural style: Streamline Moderne
- Part of: Hollywood Boulevard Commercial and Entertainment District (ID85000704)
- Designated CP: April 4, 1985

Regal Shoes is a historic two-story building at 6349 W. Hollywood Boulevard in Hollywood, California. It is a contributing property in the Hollywood Boulevard Commercial and Entertainment District and was bought by the Church of Scientology in 1996.

== History ==
Regal Shoes Building, built in 1939, was designed by Walker & Eisen, the architecture film responsible for many of Los Angeles's most notable buildings, including the Fine Arts Building, Hollywood Plaza Hotel, Taft Building, and United Artists Theatre. One or more foodservice establishments occupied the building in the 1940s and by 1959, a Regal shoestore was in the building.

In 1985, the Hollywood Boulevard Commercial and Entertainment District was added to the National Register of Historic Places, with Regal Shoes listed as a contributing property in the district.

Regal Shoes Building was bought by the Church of Scientology in 1996, to be used by the church's architecture and design team. The Sea Org logo is located on the exterior of the building.

== Architecture and design ==
Regal Shoes Building features a Streamline Moderne design that includes a rounded corner, porthole windows, banded windows, and a Terrazzo entry.

== See also ==
- List of contributing properties in the Hollywood Boulevard Commercial and Entertainment District
