= Silverwood's Building =

Building in Los Angeles, California

- U.S. Historic district – Contributing property
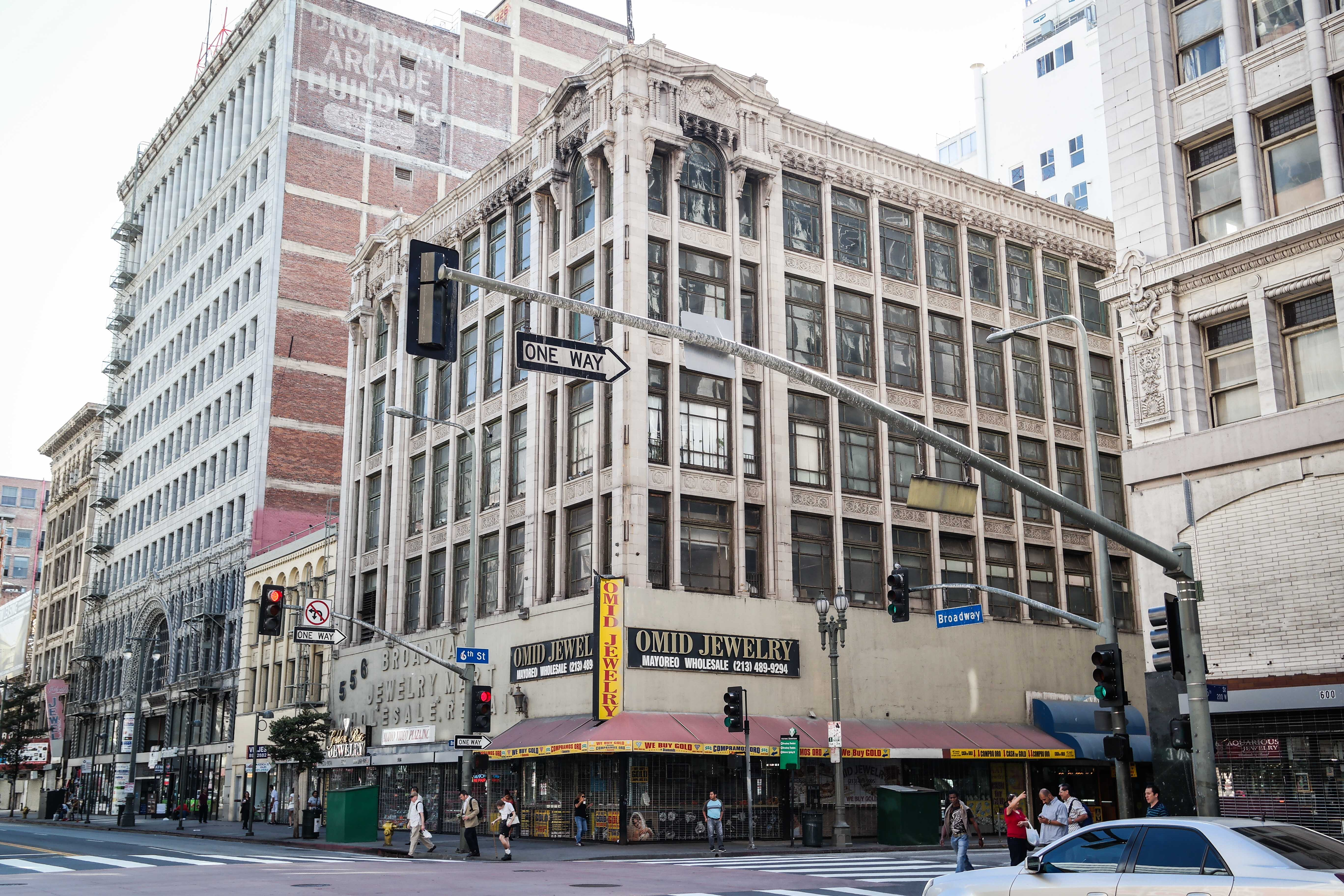
- The building in 2014

- Location within the Los Angeles metropolitan area
- Location: 558 S. Broadway and 221 W. 6th Street, Los Angeles, California
- Coordinates: 34°02′48″N 118°15′06″W
- Built: 1920
- Architect: Walker & Eisen
- Part of: Broadway Theater and Commercial District (ID79000484)
- Designated CP: May 9, 1979

Silverwood's Building is a historic five-story building located at 558 S. Broadway and 221 W. 6th Street in the Broadway Theater District in the historic core of downtown Los Angeles.

== History ==
Silverwood's Building was built in 1920 and designed by Walker & Eisen, the architecture firm responsible for several buildings on Broadway, including the Apparel Center and Platt Building. This building was originally designed as a mercantile center, with a department store as its main tenant. A one-story Silverwoods was previously located on the property, and the location became the company's flagship after this building replaced that one in 1920.

In 1979, the Broadway Theater and Commercial District was added to the National Register of Historic Places, with Silverwood's Building listed as a contributing property in the district.

== Architecture and design ==
Silverwood's Building is made of steel-framed reinforced concrete and brick with terra cotta detailing.

== See also ==
- List of contributing properties in the Broadway Theater and Commercial District
