= Wurlitzer Building =

Wurlitzer Building may refer to the following buildings in the United States:

- Wurlitzer Building, now The Siren Hotel, in Detroit, Michigan
- Wurlitzer Building (California), on Broadway in downtown Los Angeles
- North Tonawanda Barrel Organ Factory, in North Tonawanda, New York
- Wurlitzer Building at 116–122 West 42nd Street, New York City, whose design was influenced by Bush Tower
- Wurlitzer Flats Building, at 674 Main Street, Buffalo, New York, a unique blend of architectural grandeur and contemporary sophistication designed by architect by Edward Kent in 1895.

== See also ==
- Wurlitzer
