= Theodore Eisen =

American architect

- Born: July 10, 1852; Cincinnati, U.S.
- Died: March 14, 1924 (aged 73); Los Angeles, U.S.
- Occupation: Architect
- Spouse: Annie Bennett
- Children: Percy A. Eisen; Edward George Eisen
- Parent(s): Augustus Ferdinand Eisen; Babette Eisen

Theodore Eisen (July 10, 1852 – March 14, 1924) was an American architect. He designed many houses in Los Angeles, California.

== Early life ==
Theodore Augustus Eisen was born on July 10, 1852, in Cincinnati, Ohio. His father, Augustus Ferdinand Eisen (1824-1870), was a Swedish-born immigrant to the United States. His mother, Babette Eisen, was a Prussian-born immigrant. After living in Ohio, they settled in San Francisco, California, where Theodore grew up.

== Career ==
Eisen became an architect in Los Angeles, California, in 1887. He opened a practice with Sumner Hunt in 1895. They designed mansions near Chester Place. In 1892, they designed the Froebel Institute, later known as Casa de Rosas. They also designed several mansions on West Adams Boulevard in the Craftsman and Tudor Revival architectural styles. They planned design the Posey House for Sara Posey and her husband, Oliver Posey, a mining businessman, with touches of Gothic Revival, Moorish Revival and Spanish Revival styles. However, as the Poseys's wealth declined, the project was shelved. Instead, St Vincent's Church was built two decades later, thanks to a gift from the Doheny family.

== Works ==
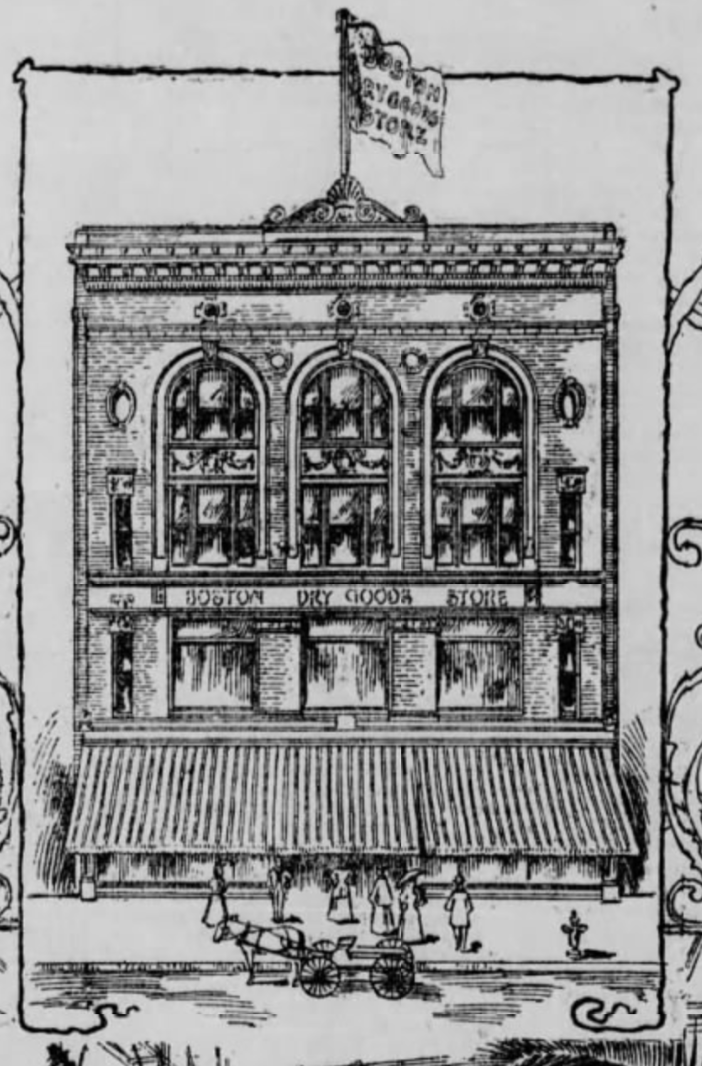
J. W. Robinson's store, 1895-1915, 239 S. Broadway. Demolished.

- 1895, J. W. Robinson's Boston Dry Goods Store (forerunner of a large regional department store chain), 239 S. Broadway (Los Angeles), and its annex at its back facing Hill Street, opened in 1908.
- From 1895 to 1910, Eisen designed the "El Alisal", also known as the Lummis House, for Charles F. Lummis. It is located at 200 East Avenue 43.
- In 1917, he designed the Casa de Adobe located at 4603 North Figueroa Street, an adobe hacienda.

Eisen was a member of the American Institute of Architects and the Sunset Club in Los Angeles.

== Personal life and death ==
Eisen married Annie Bennett (1858-1932), an Australian-born immigrant to the United States. They married in San Francisco, California. They were Episcopalians. They had two son: Percy A. Eisen, who became a renowned architect in Los Angeles; and Dr. Edward George Eisen.

Eisen died on March 14, 1924, in Los Angeles, California.
