= Platt Building =

- U.S. Historic district – Contributing property
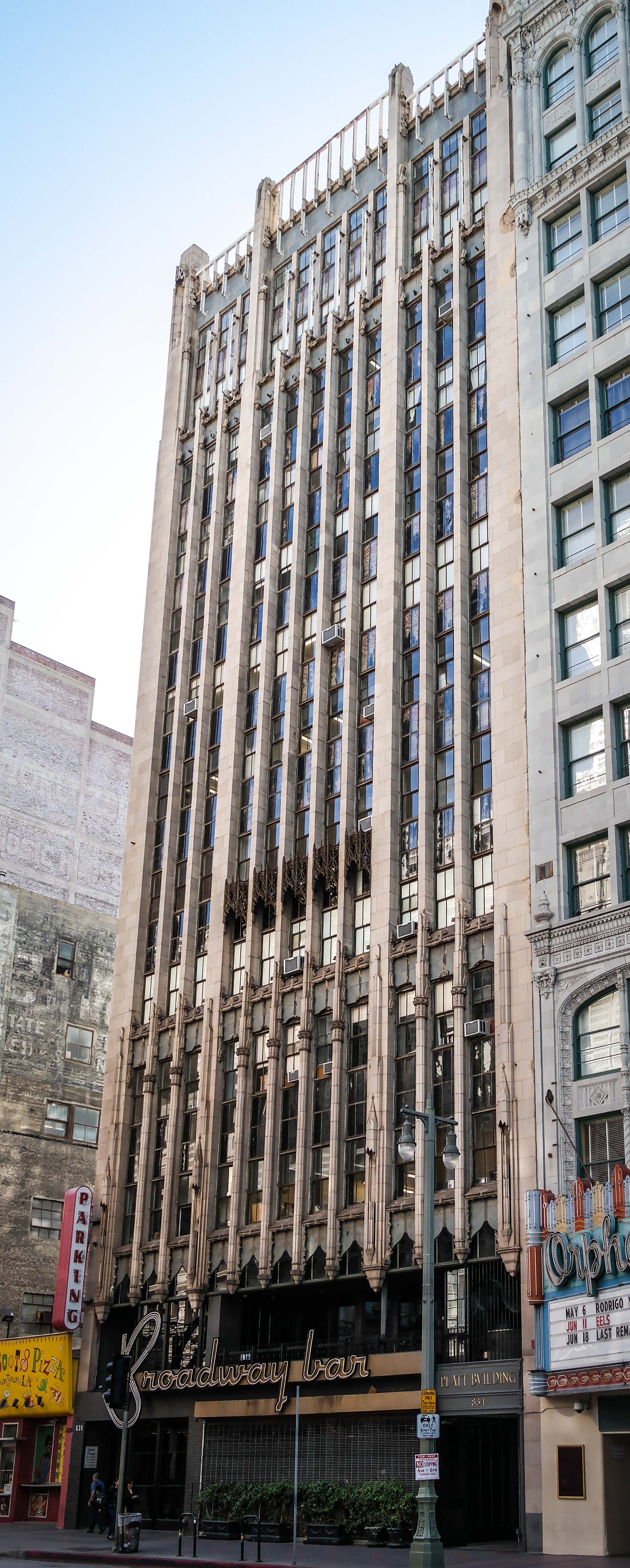
- The building in 2014
- Location: 834 S. Broadway, Los Angeles, California
- Coordinates: 34.043°N 118.255°W
- Built: 1927
- Architect: Walker & Eisen
- Architectural style: Gothic Revival
- Part of: Broadway Theater and Commercial District (ID79000484)
- Designated CP: May 9, 1979

Platt Building, also known as Platt Music Company Building and Anjac Fashion Building, is a historic twelve-story highrise located at 834 South Broadway in the Broadway Theater District in the historic core of downtown Los Angeles.

== History ==
Platt Building was built in 1927 and designed by Walker & Eisen, an architecture firm known for many Los Angeles landmarks, including the Fine Arts Building, Hollywood Plaza Hotel, Taft Building, James Oviatt Building, United Artists Theatre, and more. The building was built to a height of 150 feet, the legal limit at the time, and its original tenant was the Platt Music Corporation, who had a concert hall that took up an entire floor.

In 1964, Annette and Jack Needleman began buying property in the area. They renamed this and several other buildings Anjac Fashion, a portmanteau of their first names. In 1979, the Broadway Theater and Commercial District was added to the National Register of Historic Places, with the Anjac Fashion Building at 834 S. Broadway listed as a contributing property in the district.

The Broadway Bar moved into the building in 2005.

== Architecture and design ==
Platt Building features a Gothic Revival design and is made of steel-framed concrete with a terra cotta facade.

== See also ==
- List of contributing properties in the Broadway Theater and Commercial District
- Anjac Fashion Building (disambiguation), for other Anjac Fashion Buildings
