= Hotel Normandie (Los Angeles) =

Coordinates: 34°03′48″N 118°18′03″W

The Hotel Normandie is a historic boutique hotel within what is now Koreatown, Los Angeles. It is located at 605 S. Normandie Ave and has 92 guest rooms and suites. It was built in 1926 in the Wilshire district in the Renaissance Revival style and was designed by Walker & Eisen, the firm of Los Angeles architects Percy A. Eisen and Albert R. Walker.

Author Malcolm Lowry wrote a significant portion of the novel Under the Volcano while residing at the hotel. Under the Volcano is now listed at #11 on Modern Library's list of 100 Best Novels.

After many years of disrepair, the property was acquired in 2010 for $4.4 million by Pasadena-based architect and historic preservationist Jingbo Lou who converted a decaying eyesore into an upscale boutique hotel by spending an additional $5 million on repairs and improvements.

The hotel was listed as Los Angeles Historic-Cultural Monument #1013 in 2012 by the Cultural Heritage Commission City of Los Angeles.

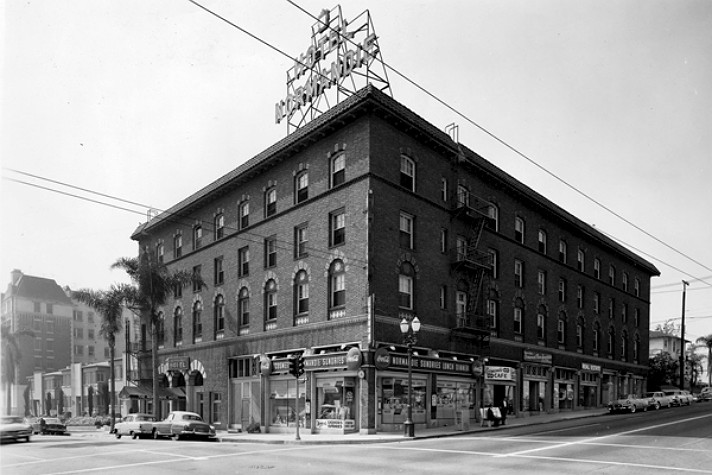
Hotel Normandie in the 1940s, Looking SW at the intersection of 6th and Normandie

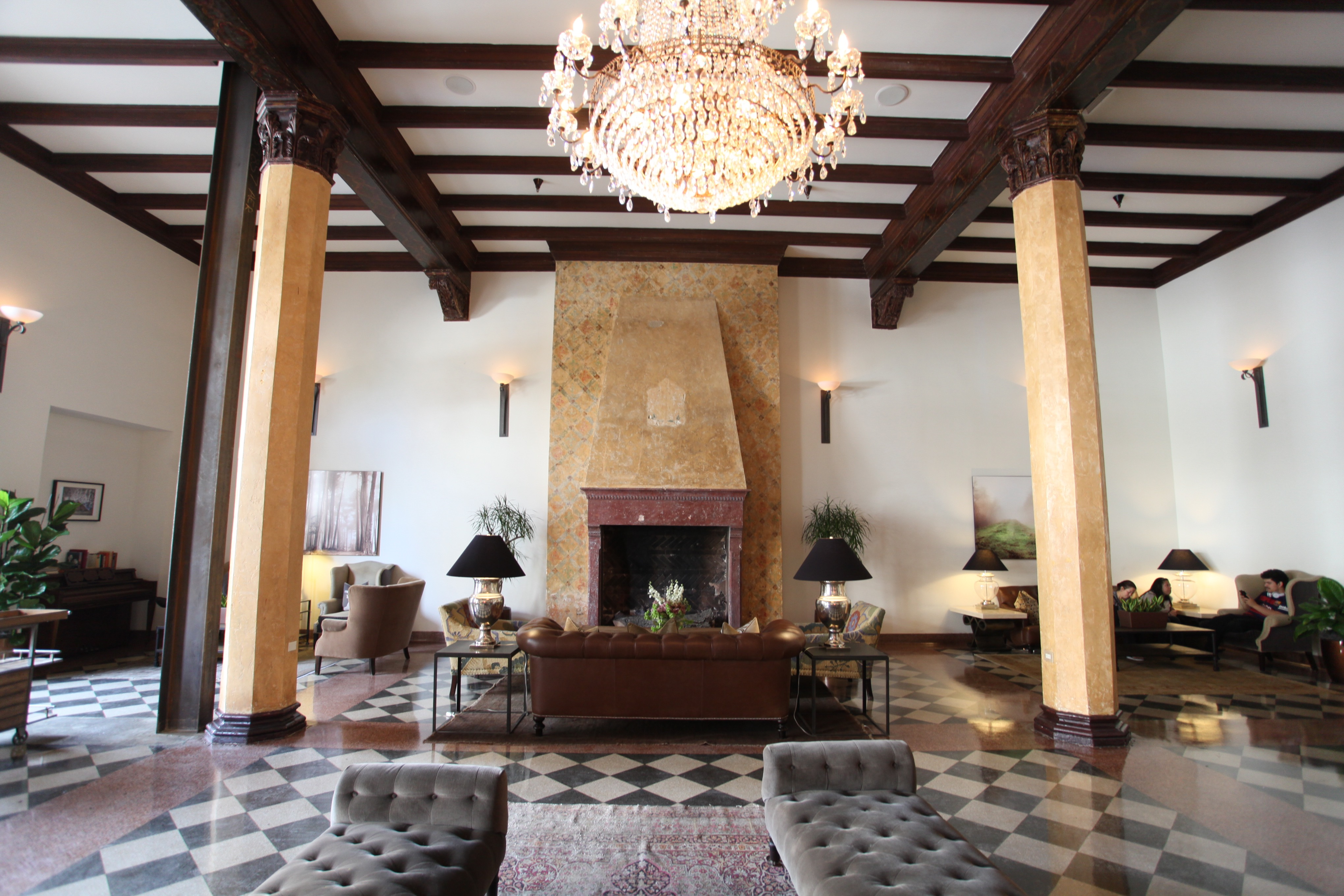
Fully restored lobby with original Moorish details (2016)

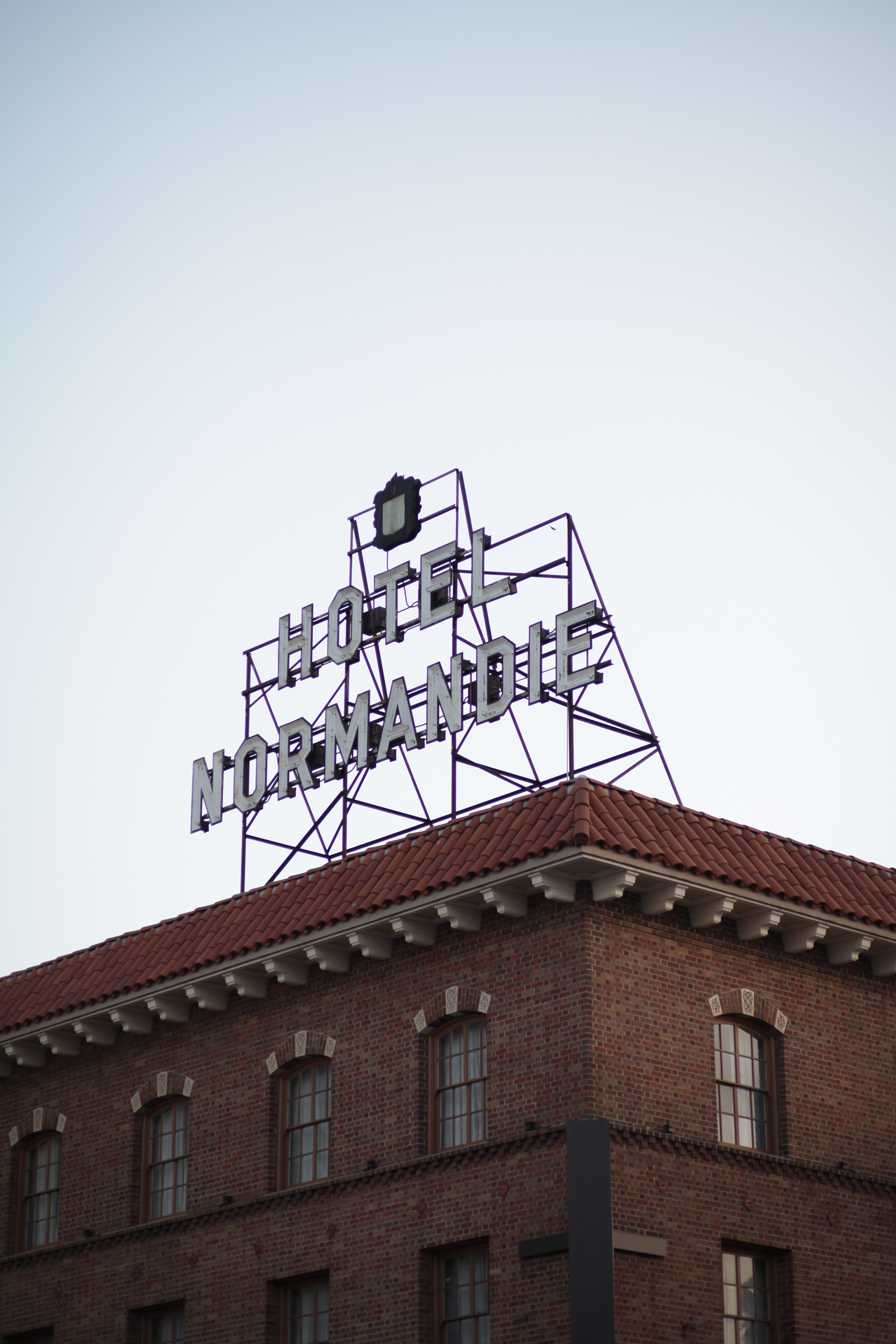
The rooftop sign from the 1940s, taken in 2016.

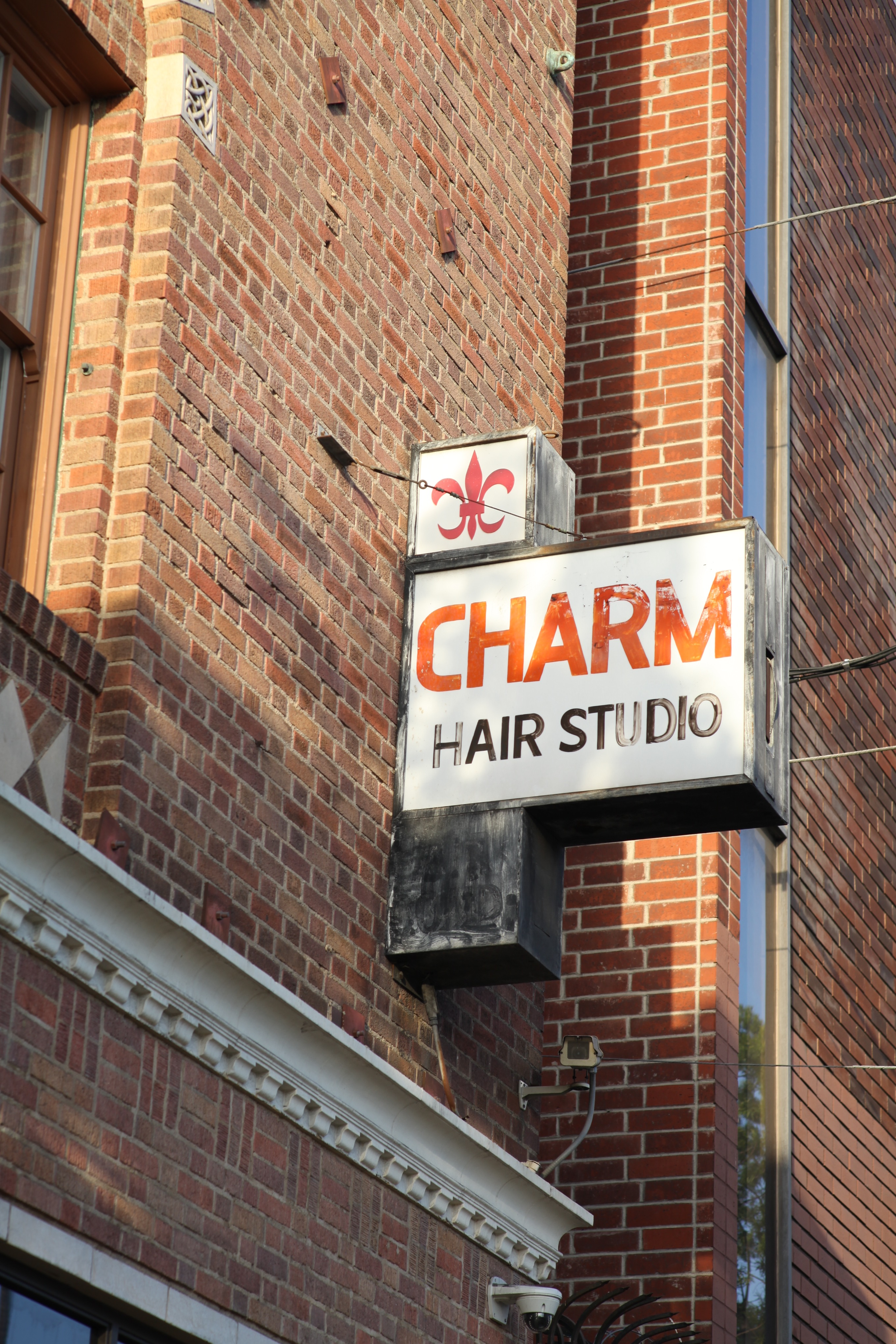
Original signage from a barber shop that once occupied part of the hotel's retail space

== History ==
In March 1925, plans for the four-story store and hotel building were prepared for Karl Elliot by Architects Walker & Eisen. It was projected to cost $200,000 and would have stores on the first floor, with a hundred rooms on the upper floors. In 1931, it was selected as the official hotel for Stanford University alumni, as well as the University of Southern California and the University of California Los Angeles.

In 1964, a $250,000 modernization took place, scheduled by Paul and Adelaide Stockhammer. They purchased the building from the Hotel Normandie Ltd for more than $750,000. The Stockhammers had operated hotels and motels in New York, Massachusetts, and Florida, according to John Barbary, a real estate broker who represented the purchasers.

In the late 1970s, the hotel became the Normandie Wilshire Retirement Hotel.
