= Walker & Eisen =

Architecture firm prominent in Los Angeles (1919-1941)

Practice information
- Partners: Albert R. Walker; Percy A. Eisen
- Founded: 1919
- Dissolved: 1941
- Location: Los Angeles, California

Significant works and honors
- Buildings: Taft Building; Hollywood Plaza Hotel; United Artists Theatre; James Oviatt Building; Beverly Wilshire Hotel; El Cortez Hotel; Valley National Bank Building

Walker & Eisen (1919−1941) was an architectural partnership between Albert Raymond Walker and Percy Augustus Eisen best known for the numerous historic buildings they designed throughout California, particularly in and around Los Angeles. They were considered one of the top firms in the city for several decades.

== Partners ==
=== Albert Raymond Walker ===
Albert Raymond Walker
- Born: May 9, 1881; Sonoma, California
- Died: September 17, 1958 (aged 77); Los Angeles, California
- Education: Brown University
- Occupation: Architect
- Spouse: Jesse R. (Morgan) Eisen
- Parent(s): Albert Walker, Elizabeth Stevens
- Practice: Walker & Vawter (1910-1916); Walker & Eisen (1919-1941)

==== Early life ====
Albert Raymond Walker was born on May 9, 1881, in Sonoma, California. His parents were Albert Walker, an immigrant from Norway, and Elizabeth Stevens, from New York. They married in Sonoma around 1880, where Albert Walker worked as a carpenter.

Albert Walker died during or before 1900, at which point Elizabeth and Albert R. moved to San Diego to live with Elizabeth's sisters. Albert R. studied at Brown University beginning in 1902.

==== Early career ====
From 1901 to 1904, Albert Raymond Walker worked as a draftsman for William S. Hebbard and Irving Gill, where amongst other projects he drafted the George W. Marston House. In 1905 or 1906, Walker moved to Los Angeles, where he worked as a draftsman for John Parkinson and George Bergstrom (1905), as a designer for Alfred Rosenheim (1906), and as a designer for Myron Hunt and Elmer Grey (1907).

Walker earned his California architecture license in February 1908, after which he started his own firm located in Los Angeles's Homer Laughlin Building. During this time, he designed the Fullerton First Methodist Episcopal Church, which was listed on the National Register of Historic Places in 2001.

In 1910, Walker partnered John Terrell Vawter. Their projects included the Edward Strasburg House in Pasadena, Frank C. Hill House in Echo Park, Grible Store Building in Montrose, and the original Bible Institute of Los Angeles. Walker and Vawter's partnership dissolved in 1916, and Walker worked alone from 1917 to 1918.

==== Personal life and death ====
Walker and Jesse R. Morgan, six years his junior, married on August 25, 1909. The couple lived in Hollywood during the 1910s and by 1930, they lived in a $40,000 ($770,916 in 2025) Beverly Hills residence with their daughter Eleanor and Jesse's mother. The family's gardener and his family also lived on the property.

Walker died on September 17, 1958, in Westwood, Los Angeles and was buried at Forest Lawn Memorial Park in Glendale, California. His wife Jesse died in 1961.

=== Percy Augustus Eisen ===
Percy Augustus Eisen
- Born: December 17, 1885; Los Angeles, California
- Died: November 18, 1946 (aged 60); Los Angeles County, California
- Occupation: Architect
- Parent(s): Theodore Eisen; Annie (Bennett) Eisen
- Practice: Eisen and Son (1908-1917); Walker & Eisen (1919-1941)

==== Early life ====
Percy Augustus Eisen was born in Los Angeles, California on December 17, 1885 to Theodore Eisen, a renowned architect, and Annie (Bennett) Eisen.

==== Early career ====
Eisen partnered with his father Theodore from 1908 to 1917, similar to how Theodore partnered with his father in San Francisco in the 1870s. Together they designed the First Presbyterian Church of Hollywood and Gates Hotel in downtown Los Angeles.

==== Death ====
Eisen died on November 18, 1946, in Los Angeles County.

=== Partnership ===
Walker & Eisen was founded in late 1919 as an association between Albert Raymond Walker, Percy Augustus Eisen, and Charles M. Hutchison, Sr.. Hutchinson left the association in 1921 and Walker and Eisen's association dissolved two decades later, in 1941. During their time together, Walker & Eisen was considered one of the top architectural firms in Los Angeles.

Although primarily based in Los Angeles, Walker & Eisen designed numerous buildings throughout California over the two-plus decades they worked together, many of which have been listed in the National Register of Historic Places (NRHP) either standalone or as historic district contributing properties. Several of their buildings have also been designated Los Angeles Historic-Cultural Monuments (LAHCMs).

In the 1920s and 1930s, Walker & Eisen often worked with movie theater-specialist Clifford A. Balch. They also employed Clifford's brother William Glenn Balch as a draftsman from 1922 to 1928 and John E. Costello as a civil engineer in San Francisco from 1927 to 1931.

== List of works ==
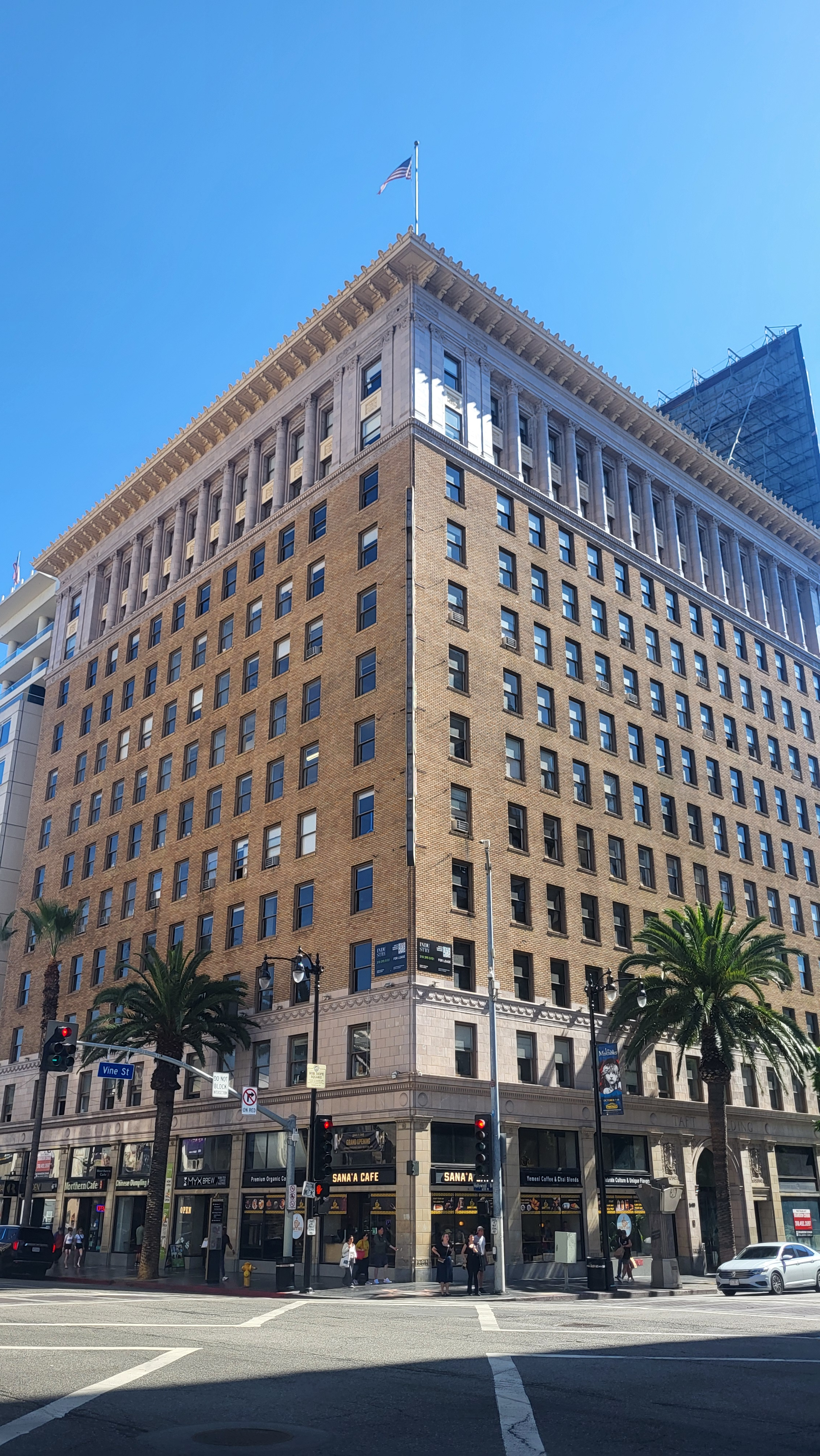
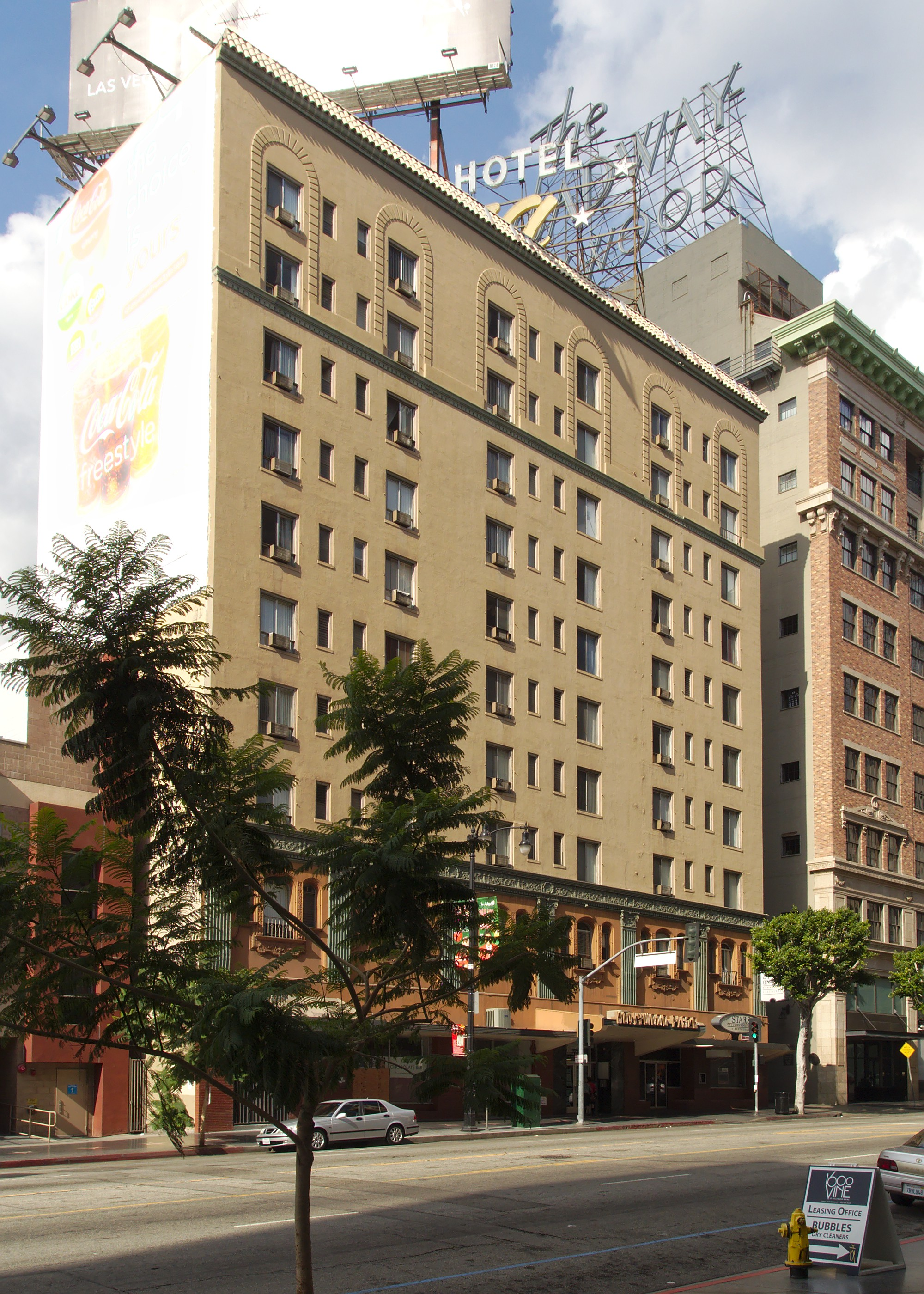
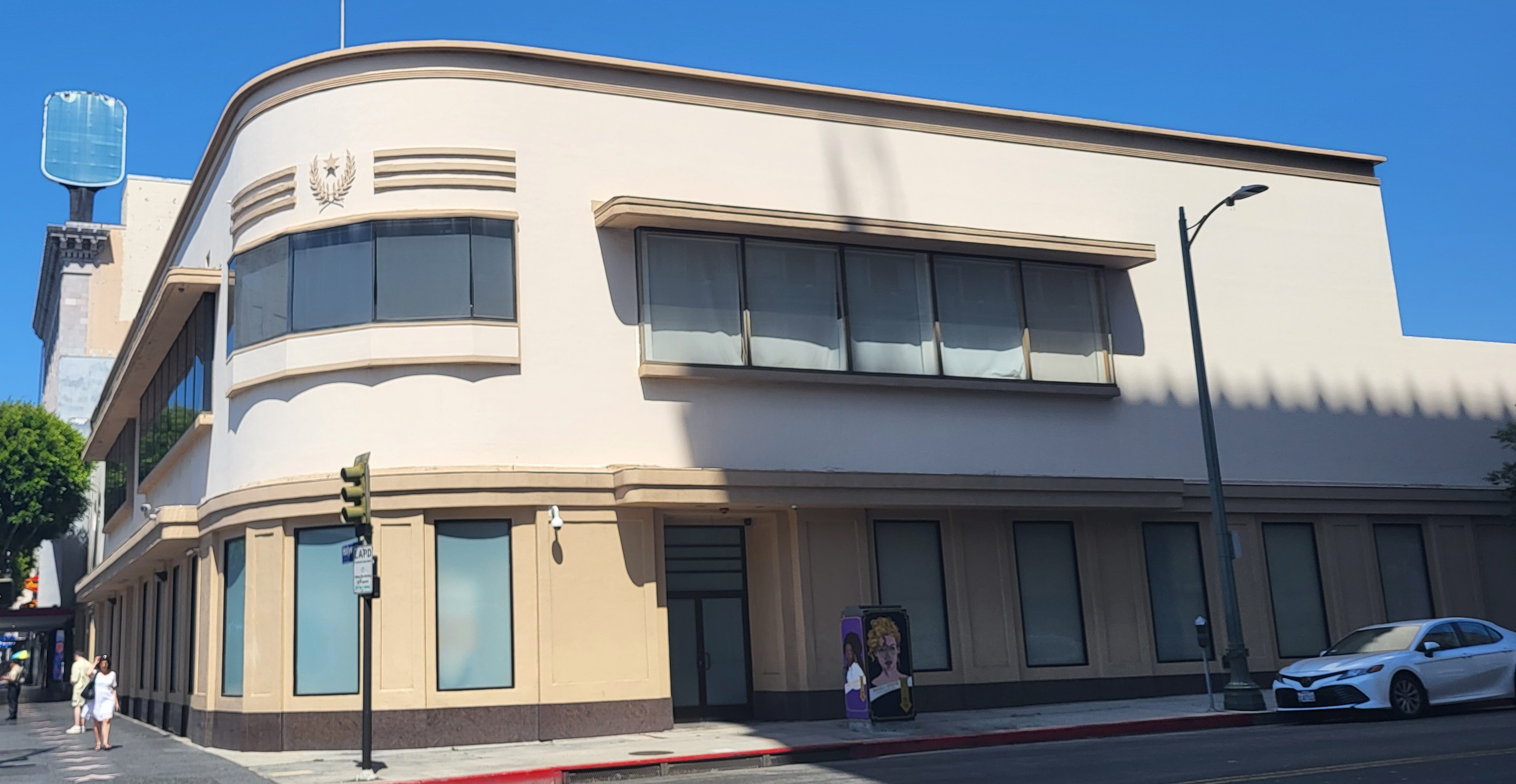
Contributing properties in the Hollywood Boulevard Commercial and Entertainment District (clockwise from upper-left): Taft Building, Hollywood Plaza Hotel, Regal Shoes Building

Notalbe Walker & Eisen designed buildings include:

=== Hollywood Boulevard Commercial and Entertainment District ===
==== NRHP contributing properties ====
- Taft Building (1923), LAHCM No. 666
- Hollywood Plaza Hotel (1924), LAHCM No. 665
- Regal Shoes Building (1939)

==== Non-contributing ====
- 6356 Hollywood Boulevard (1921)

=== Broadway Theater and Commercial District ===
==== NRHP contributing properties ====
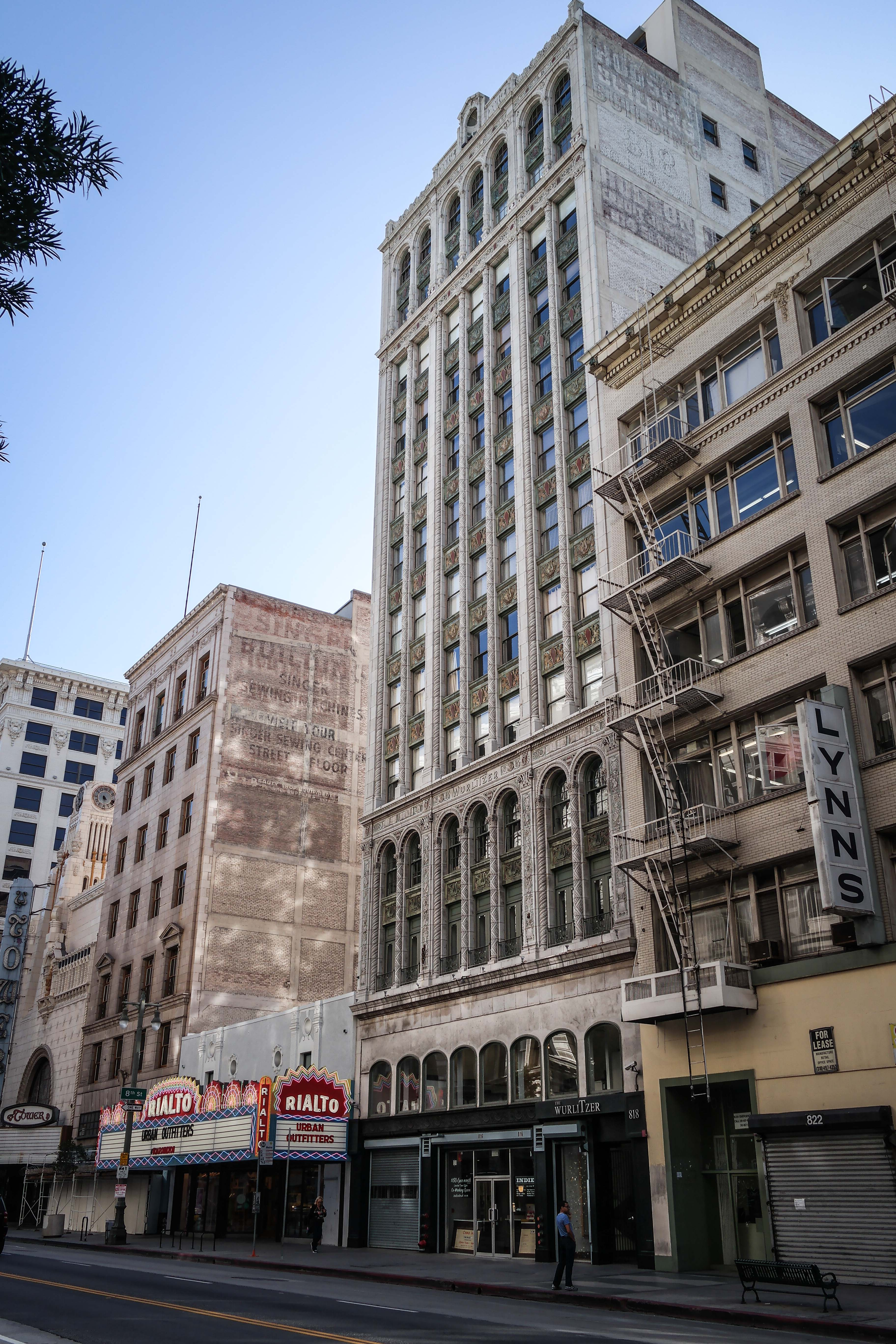
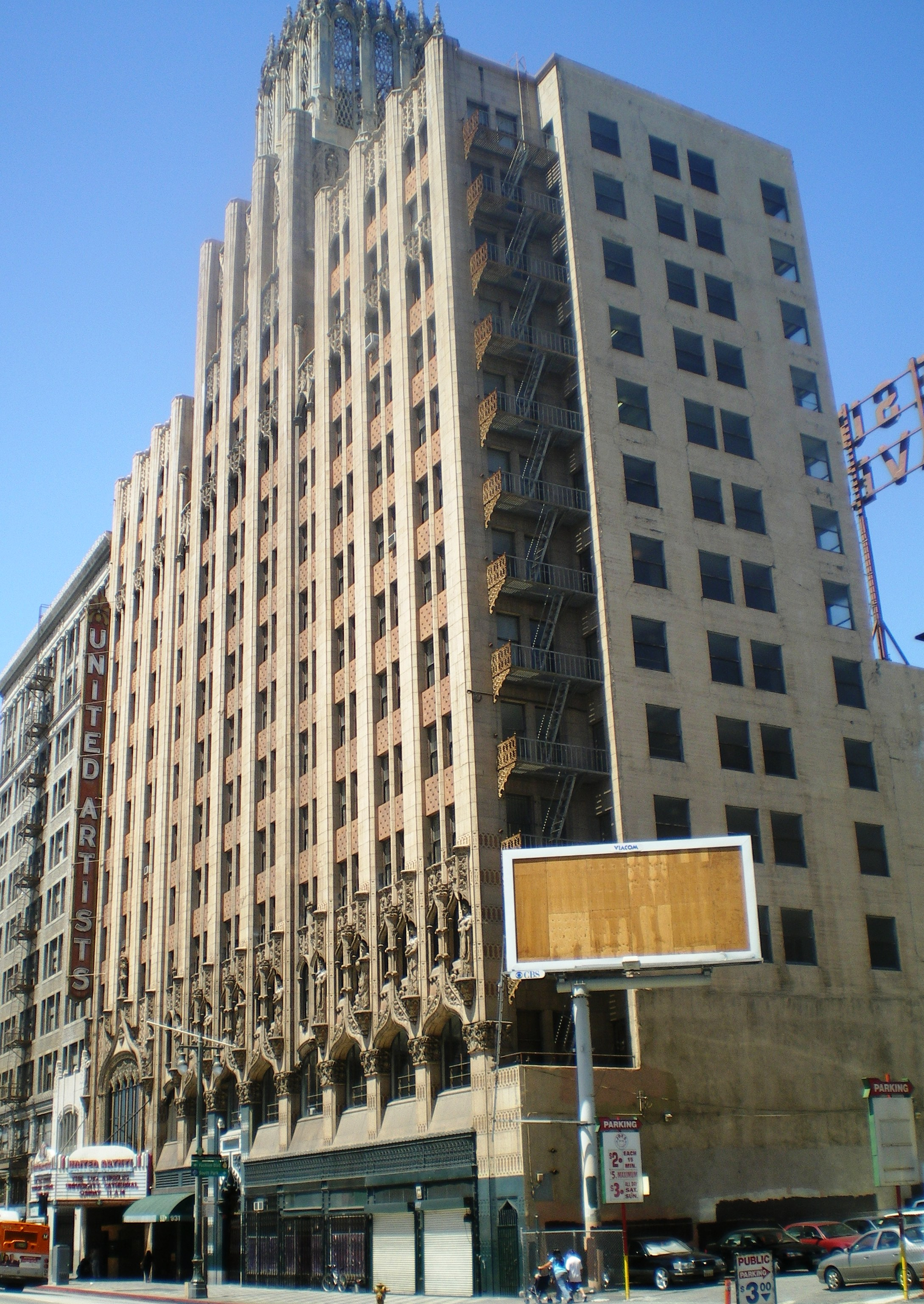
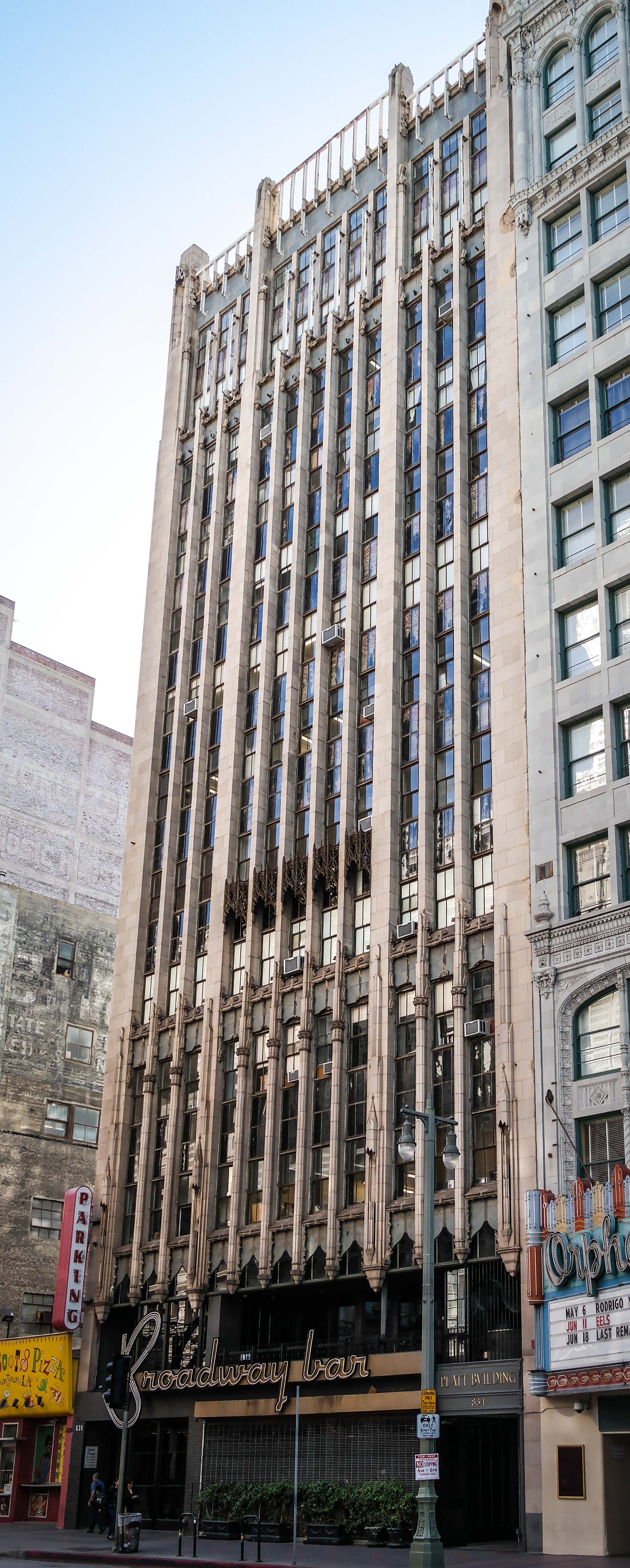
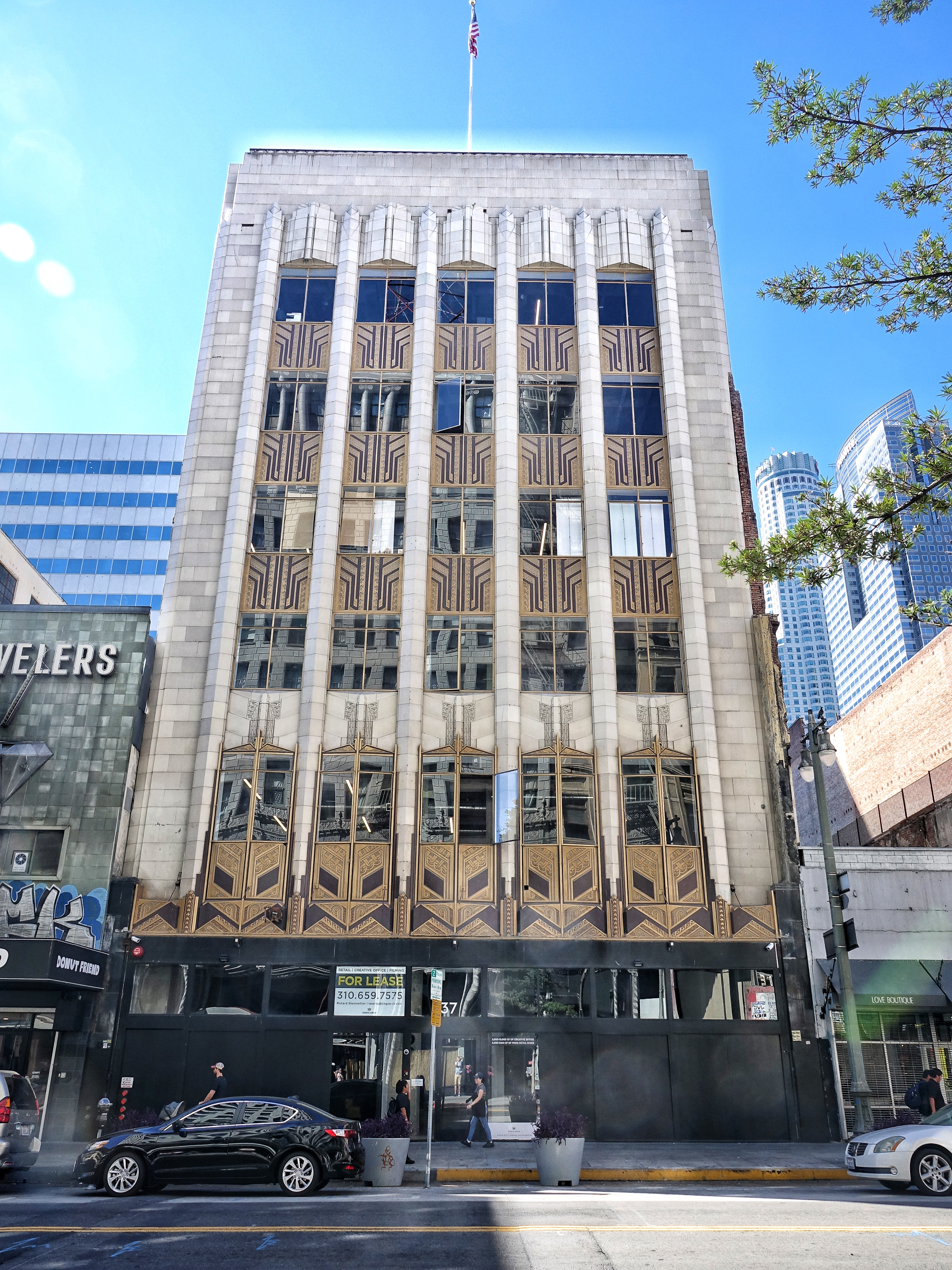
Contributing properties in the Broadway Theater and Commercial District (clockwise from upper-left): Wurlitzer Building, United Artists Theatre, F. and W. Grand Silver Store Building, Platt Building,
- Apparel Center Building (1923)
- United Artists Theatre, with C. Howard Crane (1927), LAHCM No. 523
- Platt Building (1927)
- F. and W. Grand Silver Store Building (1931), LAHCM No. 1155

=== Elsewhere in Los Angeles ===
- Roosevelt Theater (1921)
- Gaylord Apartments (1924)
- Apartment building at 1861 N. Whitley Avenue (1924)
- National City Bank of Los Angeles (1924), LAHCM No. 871
- Hotel Normandie (1925), LAHCM No. 1013
- Fine Arts Building (1927), LAHCM No. 125
- James Oviatt Building (1927−1928), NRHP No. 83004529, LAHCM No. 195
- Ambassador Hotel entrance pylons (1930)
- Farmer's Insurance Company Office Building (1930)
- Four Star Theatre (1931−1932, demolished 2015), with Clifford Balch
- Sunkist Building (1935, demolished 1972)

=== Elsewhere in California ===
- Empire Theater, Long Beach (1922, demolished 1952)
- Southern Counties Gas Company Building, Santa Ana (1923), NRHP No. 83001223
- Breakers Hotel, Long Beach (1925)
- El Cortez Hotel, San Diego (1926), NRHP No. 01001458
- Beverly-Wilshire Hotel, Beverly Hills (1926−1928), NRHP No. 87000908
- El Mirador Hotel, Palm Springs (1927−1928, demolished 1989)
- Clock Tower Building, Santa Monica (1929−1930)
- Upland City Hall and Police Station, Upland (1930)
- Farmer's Insurance Company Headquarters (1937)
- Torrance City Hall, Municipal Auditorium and Public Library
- San Luis Obispo County Court House
- Mar Monte Hotel, Santa Barbara
- Hilton Hotel, Long Beach

==== With Clifford Balch ====
- United Artists Theaters
  - East Los Angeles, 1931
  - Inglewood, 1931
  - Long Beach, 1931
  - Pasadena, 1931
  - Berkeley, 1932
  - El Centro, 1932
  - Los Angeles, 1932
  - Ventura, 1932

=== Elsewhere ===
- Valley National Bank Building, Tucson, Arizona (1929), NRHP No. 75608928

== In popular culture ==
Walker & Eisen are mentioned in the film (500) Days of Summer.
