= Taft Building (Los Angeles) =

Building in Los Angeles, California, U.S.

- U.S. Historic district – Contributing property
- Los Angeles Historic-Cultural Monument
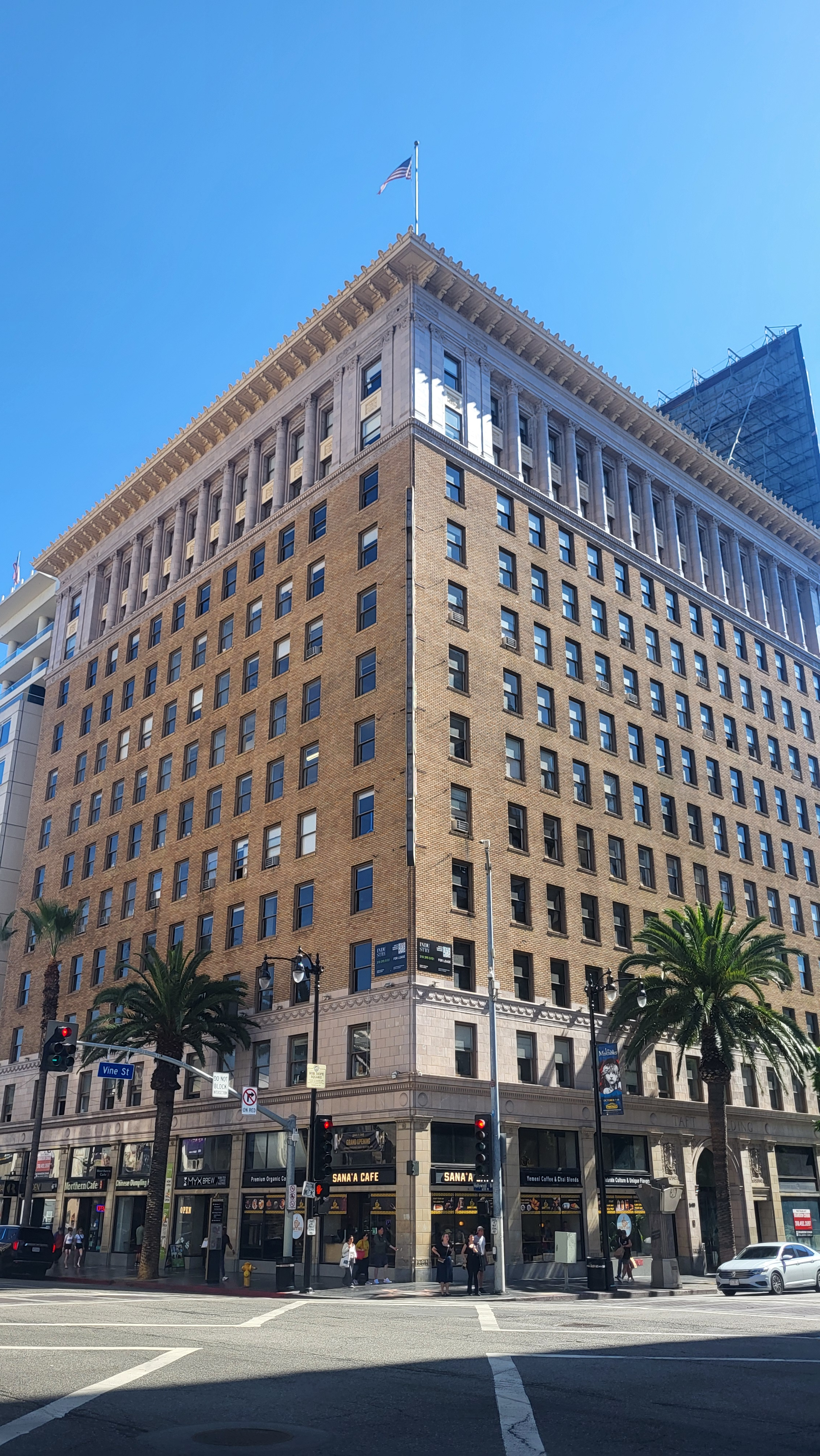
- The building as viewed from Hollywood and Vine, 2025

- Location within the Los Angeles metropolitan area
- Location: 6280 W. Hollywood Blvd. and 1680 North Vine Street, Hollywood, California
- Coordinates: 34°06′05″N 118°19′35″W
- Built: 1923
- Architect: Percy A. Eisen, Albert R. Walker
- Architectural style: Classical Revival
- Part of: Hollywood Boulevard Commercial and Entertainment District (ID85000704)
- LAHCM No.: 666

Significant dates
- Designated CP: April 4, 1985
- Designated LAHCM: September 29, 1999

Taft Building is a historic twelve-story building at 6280 W. Hollywood Blvd. and 1680 North Vine Street, Hollywood and Vine, in Hollywood, California.

== History ==
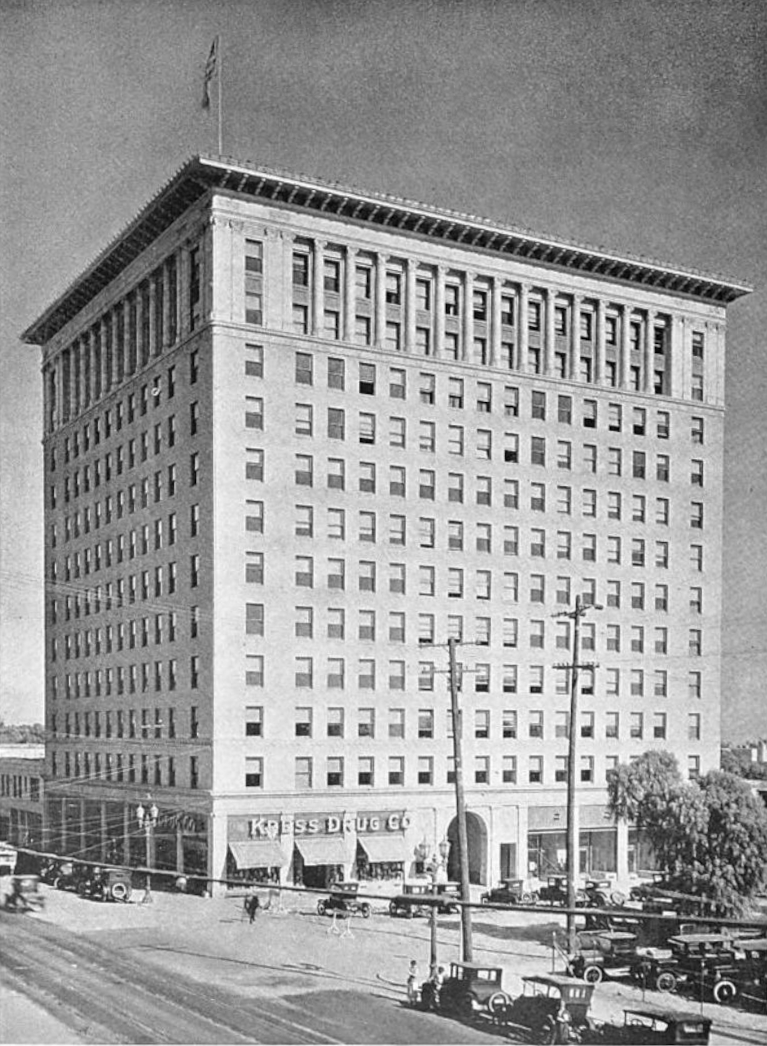
The building in 1925

Taft Building was built for A.Z. Taft Jr. (1889–1941), who purchased the Hollywood Memorial Church for $125,000 ($2.36 million in 2025), tore it down, and commissioned Taft Building on the property. The architecture firm Walker and Eisen, known for the Fine Arts Building, James Oviatt Building, and Beverly Wilshire Hotel, amongst others, designed the building. The building was constructed in 65 days and opened in 1924, making it the first high-rise office tower in Los Angeles. Its primary tenants were dentists (including Clark Gable's), doctors, and lawyers, and every Hollywood movie studio had an office in the building, as did Charlie Chaplin, Will Rogers, the Academy of Motion Picture Arts and Sciences, and numerous agents, casting companies, and publicists.

In 1985, the Hollywood Boulevard Commercial and Entertainment District was added to the National Register of Historic Places, with Taft Building listed as a contributing property in the district. In 1999, the building was designated Los Angeles Historic-Cultural Monument No. 666.

In 2011, Langer Meringoff Properties sold the building for $28.5 million ($40.8 million in 2025) to DLJ Real Estate Capital Partners, who then spent an additional $15 million ($21.5 million in 2025) in renovations. The building was later purchased by Ocean West Capital Partners for $70 million and in March 2023, Elat Properties purchased it for $28 million ($29.6 million in 2025).

== Architecture and design ==
Taft Building is L-shaped in plan and made of reinforced concrete clad in brick and ornamented with concrete and terra cotta. The building features a Classical Revival design with entablature that has a decorated frieze and is topped by a heavy bracketed cornice. The building's upper-story windows are recessed between Corinthian columns.

== See also ==
- List of Los Angeles Historic-Cultural Monuments in Hollywood
- List of contributing properties in the Hollywood Boulevard Commercial and Entertainment District
