= Wurlitzer Building (Los Angeles) =

Building in Los Angeles, California

- U.S. Historic district – Contributing property
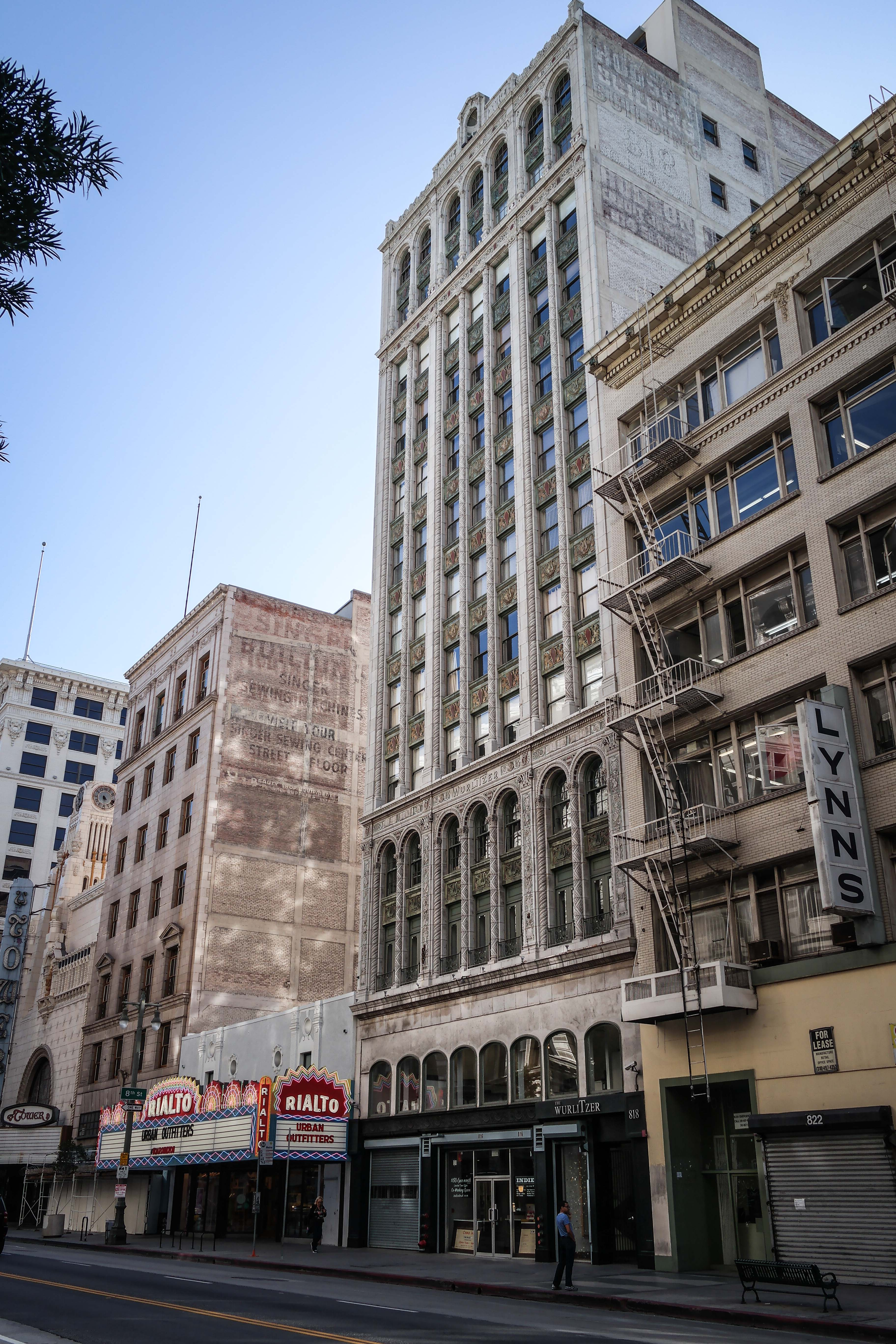
- The building in 2014

- Location within the Los Angeles metropolitan area
- Location: 814 S. Broadway, Los Angeles, California
- Coordinates: 34°02′36″N 118°15′18″W
- Built: 1923
- Architect: Walker & Eisen
- Architectural style: Spanish Renaissance
- Part of: Broadway Theater and Commercial District (ID79000484)
- Designated CP: May 9, 1979

Wurlitzer Building, also known as Apparel Center Building, Anjac Fashion Building, and Hudson Building, is a historic twelve-story highrise located at 814 S. Broadway in the Broadway Theater District in the historic core of downtown Los Angeles.

== History ==
Wurlitzer Building, built in 1923, was designed by Walker & Eisen, the architecture firm responsible for several buildings on Broadway, including the Silverwood's and Platt buildings. This building, originally lofts on the top eight floors and offices for Wurlitzer below, was billed as "the world's largest music house" upon its completion. It cost $1 million ($18.9 million in 2025) and took six months to construct, and featured a concert hall that took up an entire floor. Hat and clothing manufacturers were also located in the building, and in the 1920s they caught fire several times, but since the building was made of concrete, the fires never spread beyond the floor they started on.

The building was bought by Jack Needleman in 1962 and when he died in 1999, his son embarked on a multi-million dollar restoration. In 2002, the building completed a $2.47 million ($4.42 million in 2025) historic preservation project, and in 2007, the building was power-washed to remove grime and expose its intricate ornamentation and designs. In 2014, the building was awarded $20,788 ($28,272 in 2025) through the Bringing Back Broadway initiative to upgrade its column accent lighting.

In 1979, the Broadway Theater and Commercial District was added to the National Register of Historic Places, with this building listed as a contributing property in the district.

== Architecture and design ==
Wurlitzer Building is made of reinforced concrete and brick with a multi-colored terra cotta facade and features a Spanish Renaissance design with decorative cornice, arched windows, and bas relief. The Wurlitzer name is carved into the building, with the names Mozart and Verdi carved in medallions beneath it.

The building was built to a height of 150 feet (46 m), the maximum allowed in Los Angeles at the time of its construction.

== See also ==
- List of contributing properties in the Broadway Theater and Commercial District
- Anjac Fashion Building (disambiguation), for other Anjac Fashion Buildings
