= Hollywood Plaza Hotel =

Hotel located in Hollywood, California

- U.S. Historic district – Contributing property
- Los Angeles Historic-Cultural Monument
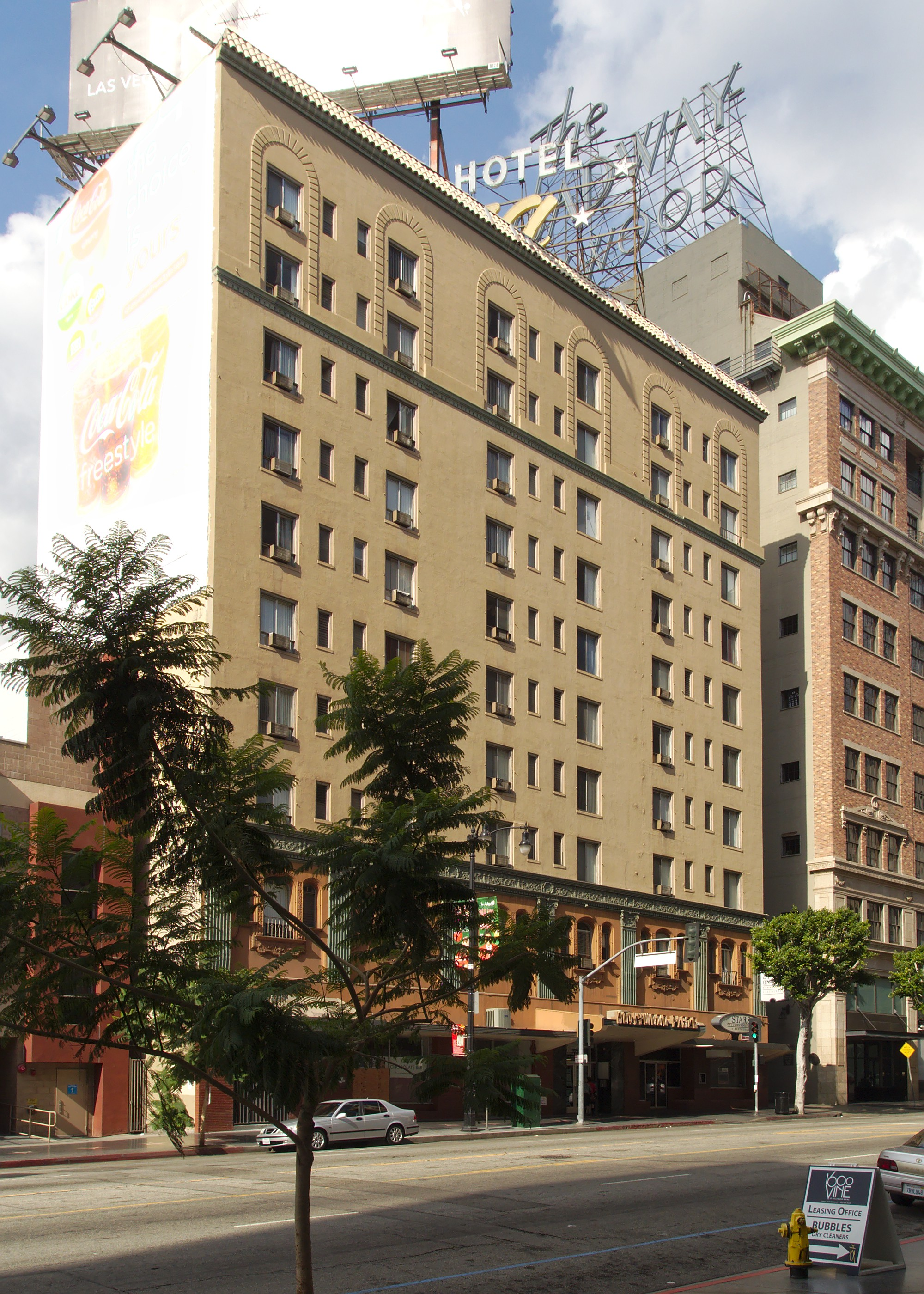
- Hotel in 2015

- Location within the Los Angeles metropolitan area
- Location: 1633–37 North Vine Street, Hollywood, California
- Coordinates: 34°6′3″N 118°19′37″W
- Built: 1925
- Architect: Percy A. Eisen; Albert R. Walker
- Architectural style: Renaissance Revival
- Part of: Hollywood Boulevard Commercial and Entertainment District (ID85000704)
- LAHCM No.: 665

Significant dates
- Designated CP: April 4, 1985
- Designated LAHCM: September 29, 1999

Hollywood Plaza Hotel, also known as Plaza Hotel, was a 200-room hotel located at 1633–37 North Vine Street in Hollywood, California, just south of Hollywood and Vine. A popular venue for film, radio, and theatre stars of the 1930s, 1940s, and 1950s, the building was converted into a retirement home in the 1970s.

== History ==
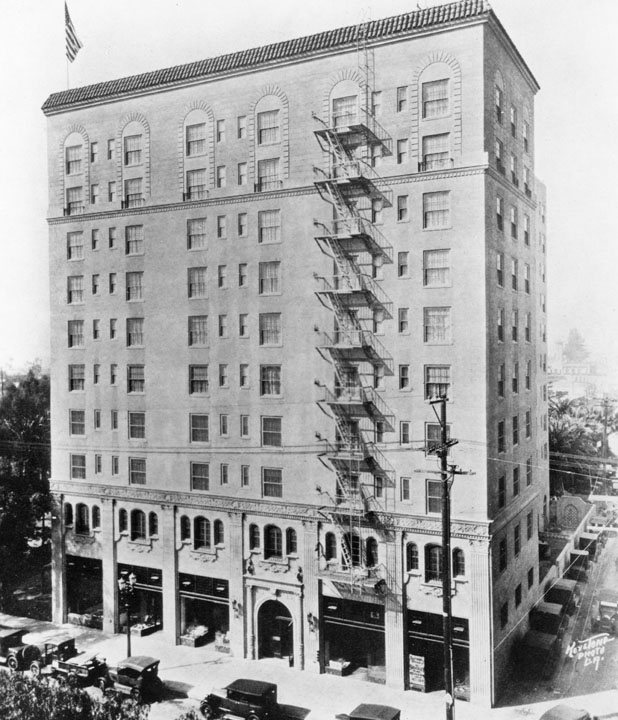
The building in 1927

Hollywood Plaza Hotel, built in 1924 and opened to the public on October 15, 1925, was one of four major hotels built in Hollywood in the 1920s. Designed by Walker & Eisen, the hotel consisted of ten stories, and cost $750,000 ($13.8 million in 2025) to construct, $250,000 more than was budgeted.

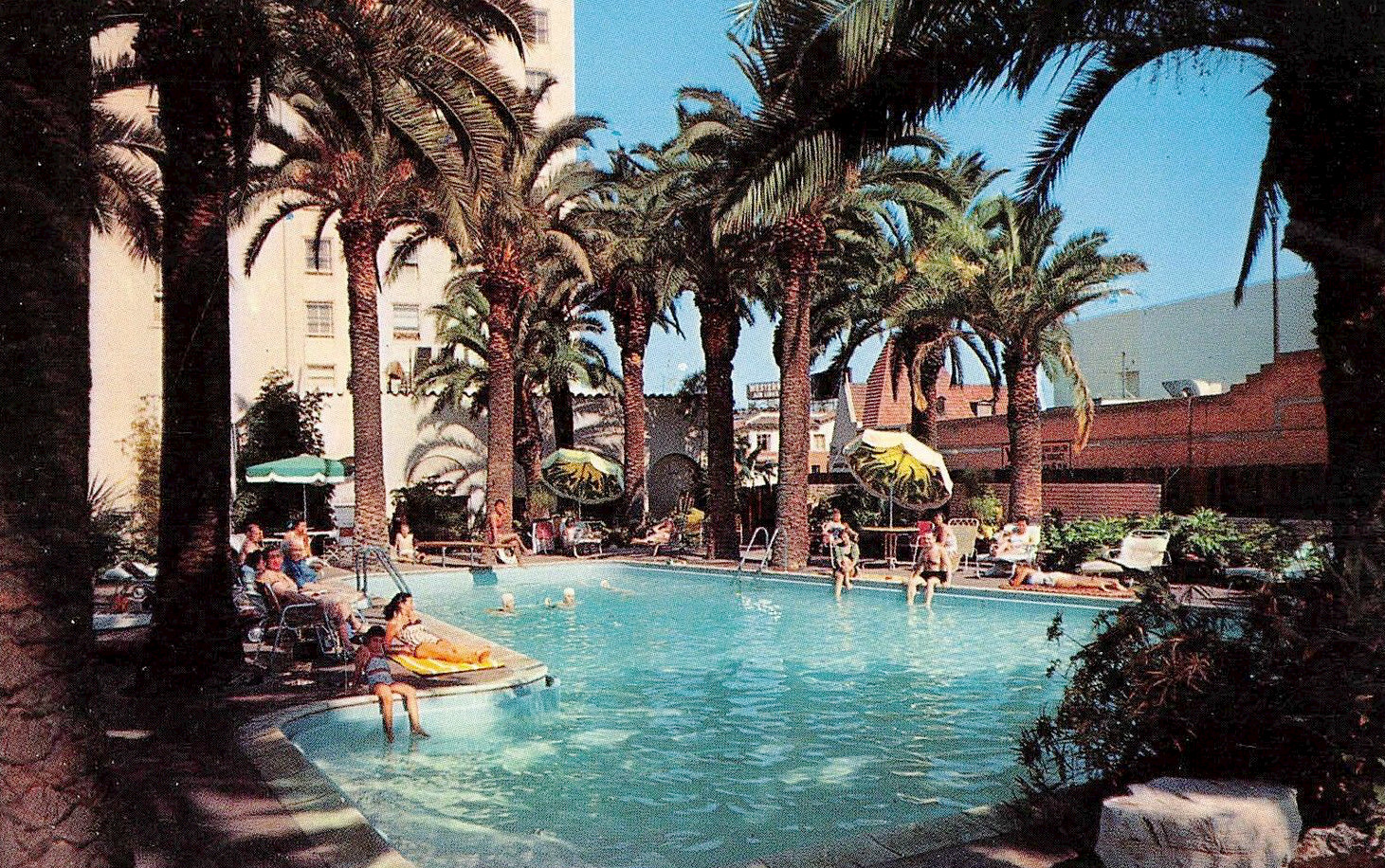
Hollywood Plaza Hotel pool, c. 1960

When the hotel opened, it consisted of 198 rooms and a ground floor that included a restaurant, beauty parlor, barber shop, ballroom, two garden plazas, and a lobby designed by George G. Benedict. Date palms surrounded the outdoor swimming pool and the name "Plaza" was featured on a large neon sign atop the roof.

=== Restaurant ===
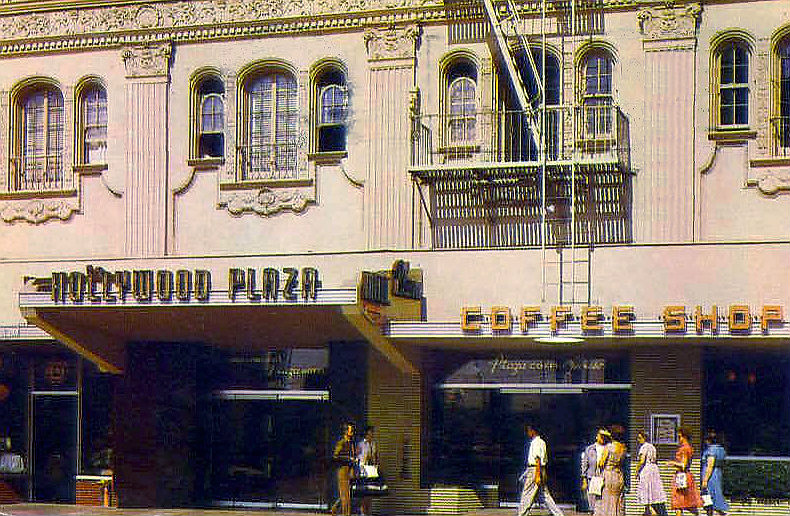
Hotel facade and coffee shop, 1963

Due to Plaza Hotel's proximity to the Famous Players-Lasky motion picture studio, the hotel's original restaurant, Klempter's Blue Plate Cafe, became a de facto studio annex. Greta Garbo was a regular and anytime an actor could not be located at the studio, call boys were dispatched to the restaurant.

In 1928, the Pig 'n Whistle Cafe, a new location in the chain most notable for its other location in Hollywood, replaced Klempter's Blue Plate Cafe. In 1933, the restaurant changed to The Russian Eagle Cafe and Garden (a favorite of Marlene Dietrich), in 1936, to the G. Albert Lansburgh designed Cinnabar, and in 1937, to the Clara Bow and Rex Bell owned, Anthony Heinsbergen designed It Cafe.

Considered one of Hollywood's most glamorous nightspots, It Cafe was Art Deco designed and meant to feel like a New York City club. But despite drawing clientele that included Gene Autry, Milton Berle, and Pat Buttram, the cafe closed in 1943, after the owners lost interest in it.

=== Other Clientele ===
In 1928, Edward Everett Horton had his newly purchased convertible delivered to his suite on the fourth floor of Plaza Hotel, as a publicity stunt for the dealership. Bette Davis resided with her mother and dog in Plaza Hotel when she arrived in Hollywood in 1930, and Ava Gardner also stayed in the hotel at the start of her career, but then had to move to a cheaper hotel nearby.

During the 1940s and 50s, the hotel became popular with radio performers, bandleaders, and live theatre actors. Those who stayed at the hotel include Jackie Gleason, Doris Day, Joe Frisco, Edward Everett Horton, Harry James, Paul Whiteman, Hal McIntyre, and more. Additionally, Johnny Grant broadcast daily from the hotel's bar, Frank Sinatra frequented a barber shop in the hotel's basement, and George Burns had an office at the top of the hotel, where he was introduced to "the most beautiful girl you’ve ever seen": Marilyn Monroe.

Other notable hotel guests include Joe Di Maggio, Babe Ruth, Howard Hughes, and Ernest Hemingway.

=== Notoriety ===
The hotel had its share of notoriety. In 1937, Ern Westmore, released after a drunk-driving charge, checked into a 10th-floor room and threatened to leap out the window; his brother Frank came to calm him down. That same year, an airline stewardess was found dead in her room. In 1954, an Alaskan woman released on bail after being indicted for the murder of her husband committed suicide in her room, and in 1959 a woman survived an 8-story fall down the hotel's stairwell.

=== Present day ===
By the early 1970s, the hotel had become derelict, and in 1972, it was converted to an apartment hotel. In 2004, it was converted again, this time to senior housing. These renovations made the building "unrecognizable from the once elegant hotel of the 1920s and 1930s."

In 1985, the Hollywood Boulevard Commercial and Entertainment District was added to the National Register of Historic Places, with Plaza Hotel listed as a contributing property in the district. In 1999, the building and its neon sign were collectively designated Los Angeles Historic-Cultural Monument No. 665.

== Architecture and design ==
Hollywood Plaza Hotel is T-shaped in plan and built with reinforced concrete and artificial stone. The building, meant to be a New York-style hotel, was designed in the Renaissance Revival style and features second-floor Corinthian pilasters, a floral frieze that separates the second and third floors, and mostly unadorned third through eighth floors. Quoins are featured on the corners of the building and the upper-levels feature windows encased in two story arches.

The building's lobby originally had and Italian-coffered ceiling with bronze chandeliers, but was modernized after World War II.

== In popular culture ==
In several I Love Lucy episodes, Plaza Hotel can be seen as a silhouette through Lucy Ricardo's apartment window.

In the 1950s, the game show Queen for a Day set up a live remote broadcast location in the hotel's ballroom.

== See also ==
- List of Los Angeles Historic-Cultural Monuments in Hollywood
- List of contributing properties in the Hollywood Boulevard Commercial and Entertainment District

== Bibliography ==
- Cooper, Suzanne Tarbell; Hall, Amy Ronnebeck; Cooper, Jr., Frank E. (2005). Los Angeles Art Deco. Arcadia Publishing. ISBN 0-7385-3027-1.
- Dangcil, Thomas; Dangcil, Tommy (2002). Hollywood, 1900–1950, in Vintage Postcards. Arcadia Publishing. ISBN 978-0-7385-2073-5.
- McCann, Linda; Taube, Dace; Zachary, Claude; Roseman, Curtis C. (2008). Historic Hotels of Los Angeles and Hollywood. Arcadia Publishing. ISBN 978-0-7385-5906-3.
- Mickelson, Ed (2007). Out of the Park: Memoir of a Minor League Baseball All-Star. McFarland. ISBN 978-0-7864-8279-5.
- Treiman, Jaak (2011). A Diplomatic Guide to Los Angeles: Discovering Its Sites and Character. Velak Publishing. ISBN 978-0-9835158-0-7.
- Wanamaker, Marc (2009). Hollywood, 1940–2008. Arcadia Publishing. p. 37. ISBN 978-0-7385-5923-0.
- Wanamaker, Marc; Nudelman, Robert W. (2007). Early Hollywood. Arcadia Publishing. ISBN 978-0-7385-4792-3.
- Williams, Gregory Paul (2005). The Story of Hollywood: An Illustrated History. www.storyofhollywood.com. ISBN 978-0-9776299-0-9.
