= James Oviatt Building =

- U.S. National Register of Historic Places
- Los Angeles Historic-Cultural Monument
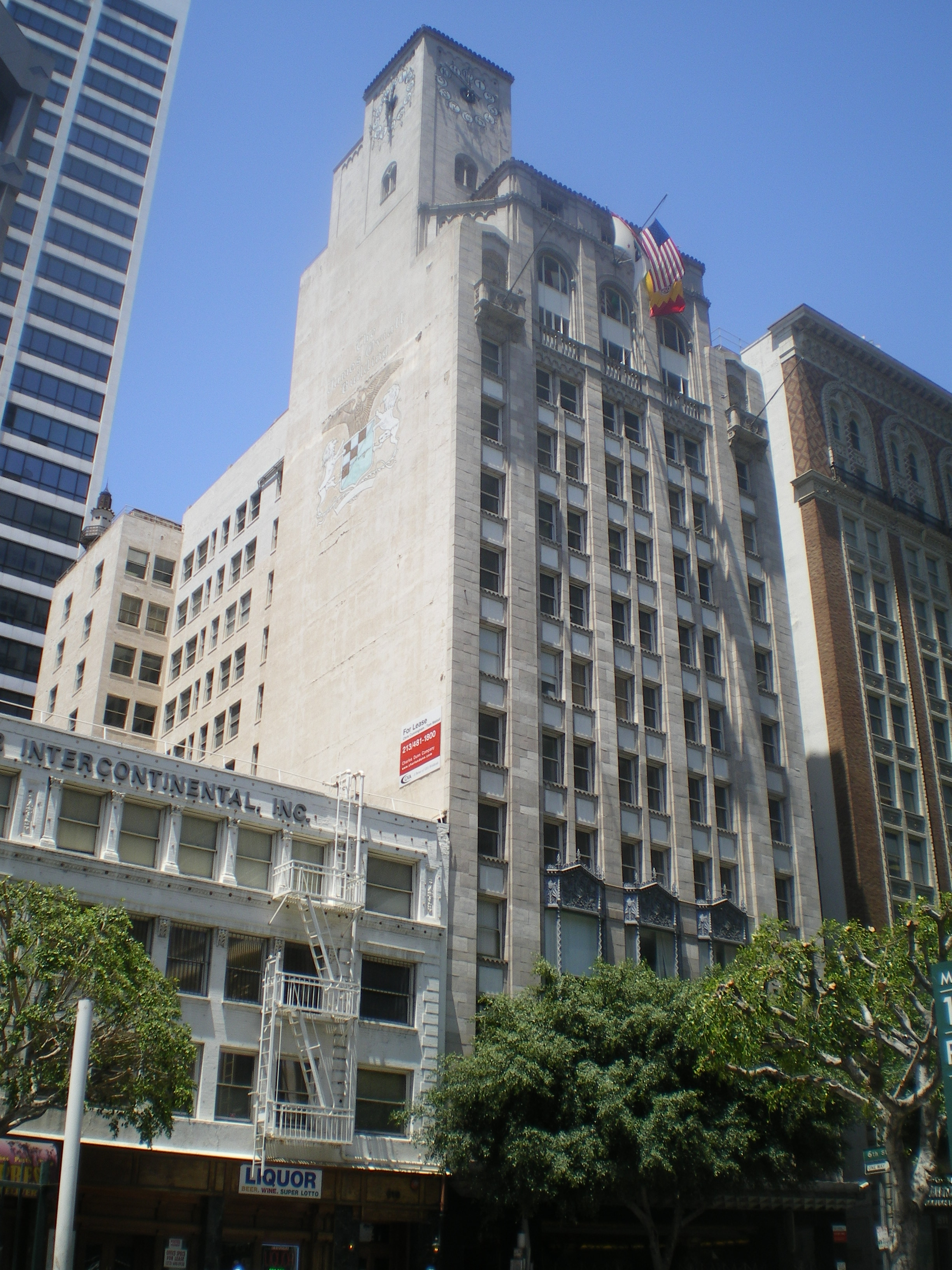
- James Oviatt Building, 2008

- Location within the Los Angeles metropolitan area Location within California Location within the United States
- Location: 617 S. Olive St., Los Angeles
- Coordinates: 34°2′52″N 118°15′17.2″W
- Built: 1927–1928
- Architect: Walker & Eisen; Feil & Paradise
- Architectural style: Art Deco Italian Romanesque
- NRHP reference No.: 83004529
- LAHCM No.: 195
- Added to NRHP: August 11, 1983

The James Oviatt Building, commonly referred to as The Oviatt Building, is an Art Deco highrise in Downtown Los Angeles located on Olive Street, half a block south of 6th St. and Pershing Square. In 1983, the Oviatt Building was listed in the National Register of Historic Places. It is also designated as a Los Angeles Historic-Cultural Monument.

The building is home to the Cicada Restaurant and Lounge.

== History ==
The building is named after James Zera Oviatt (1888–1974) who, in 1909, came from Salt Lake City to Los Angeles to work as a window dresser at C.C. Desmond's Department Store. In 1912, Oviatt and a colleague, hat salesman Frank Baird Alexander, launched their partnership in men's clothing as the Alexander & Oviatt haberdashery, at 209 West Fourth Street in downtown Los Angeles. Their 'silent partner' was Frank Shaver Allen, a wealthy and once socially prominent architect whose career had been destroyed by a sex scandal several years earlier.

During annual summer buying trips to Europe, Oviatt found stylish clothing to bring back to his prospering Los Angeles store. With the emergence of French Art Deco in the 1920s, Oviatt found the architectural style that would embody the interior design of his 1928 James Oviatt Building and its penthouse. In the 1950s and 1960s, he joined the anti-Communist John Birch Society, funded white supremacist militias and anti-Semitic groups associated with Wesley A. Swift, and distributed hate literature by mail to his business's charge customers. Oviatt's actions caused a public outcry and led customers to boycott his clothing store, causing it to close in 1966.

The Oviatt Building was designed by the Los Angeles architectural firm of Walker & Eisen. Excavation for the Oviatt Building's construction was begun in August 1927; the building was completed in May 1928. Its furnishings included a 12-ton illuminated glass cornice and glass arcade ceiling by architect Ferdinand Chanut and glassmaker Gaëtan Jeannin. René Lalique designed and created the molded glass elevator door panels, front and side doors, chandeliers, and a large panel clock. Many tons of 'Napoleon' marble and a massive, three-faced tower clock with chimes (manufactured by the pioneering electric clockmaker, Ateliers Brillié Frères) were imported from France.

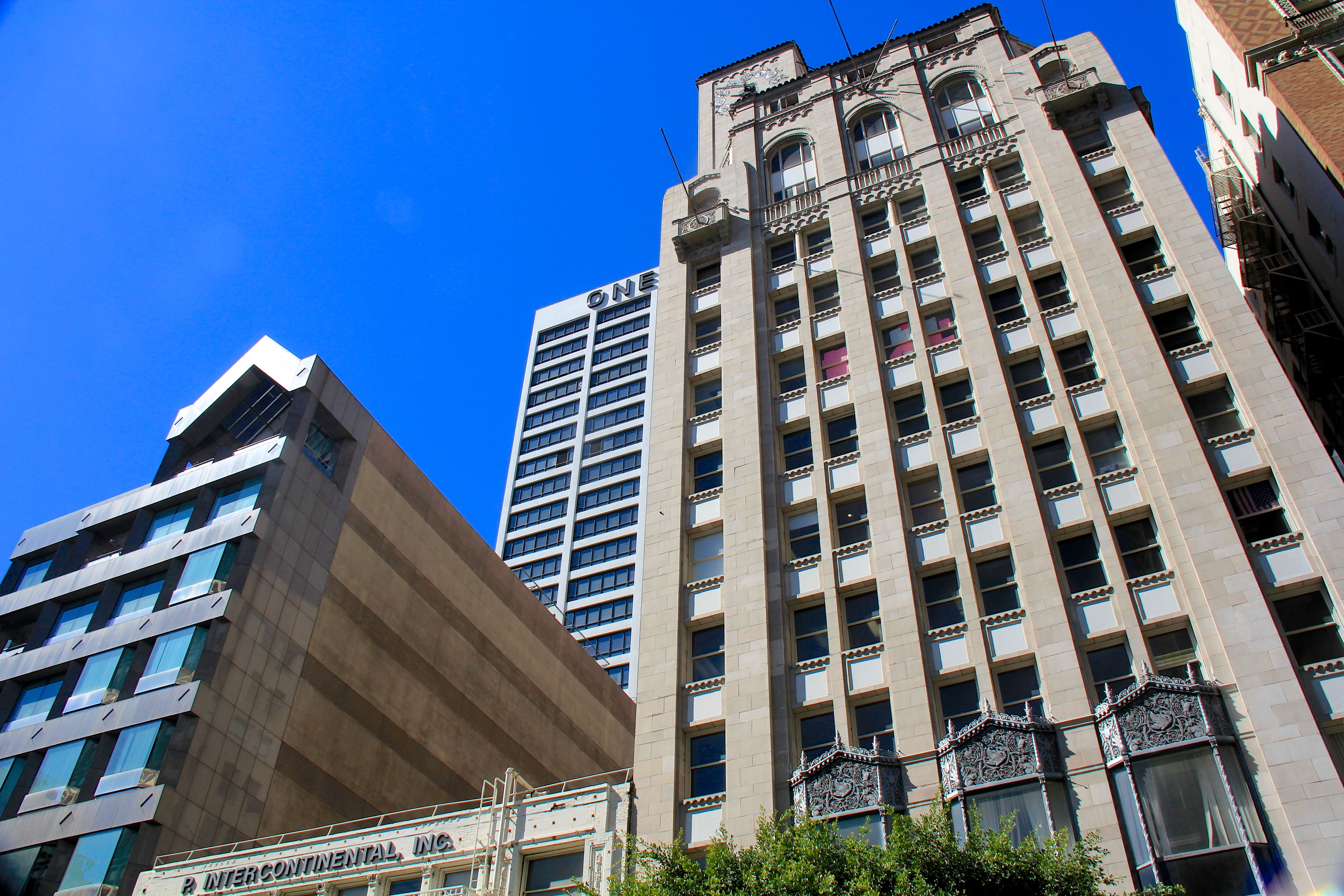

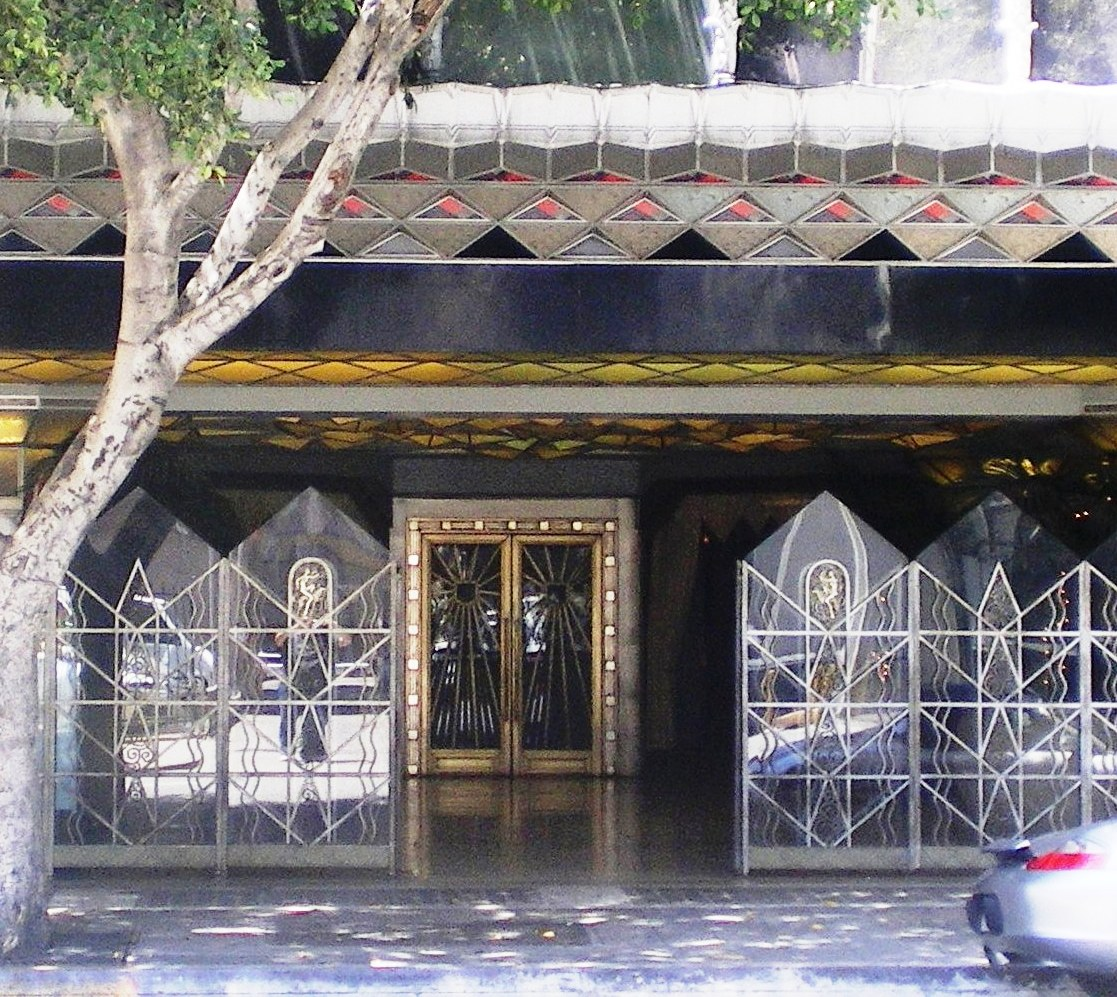
Entrance to Oviatt Building

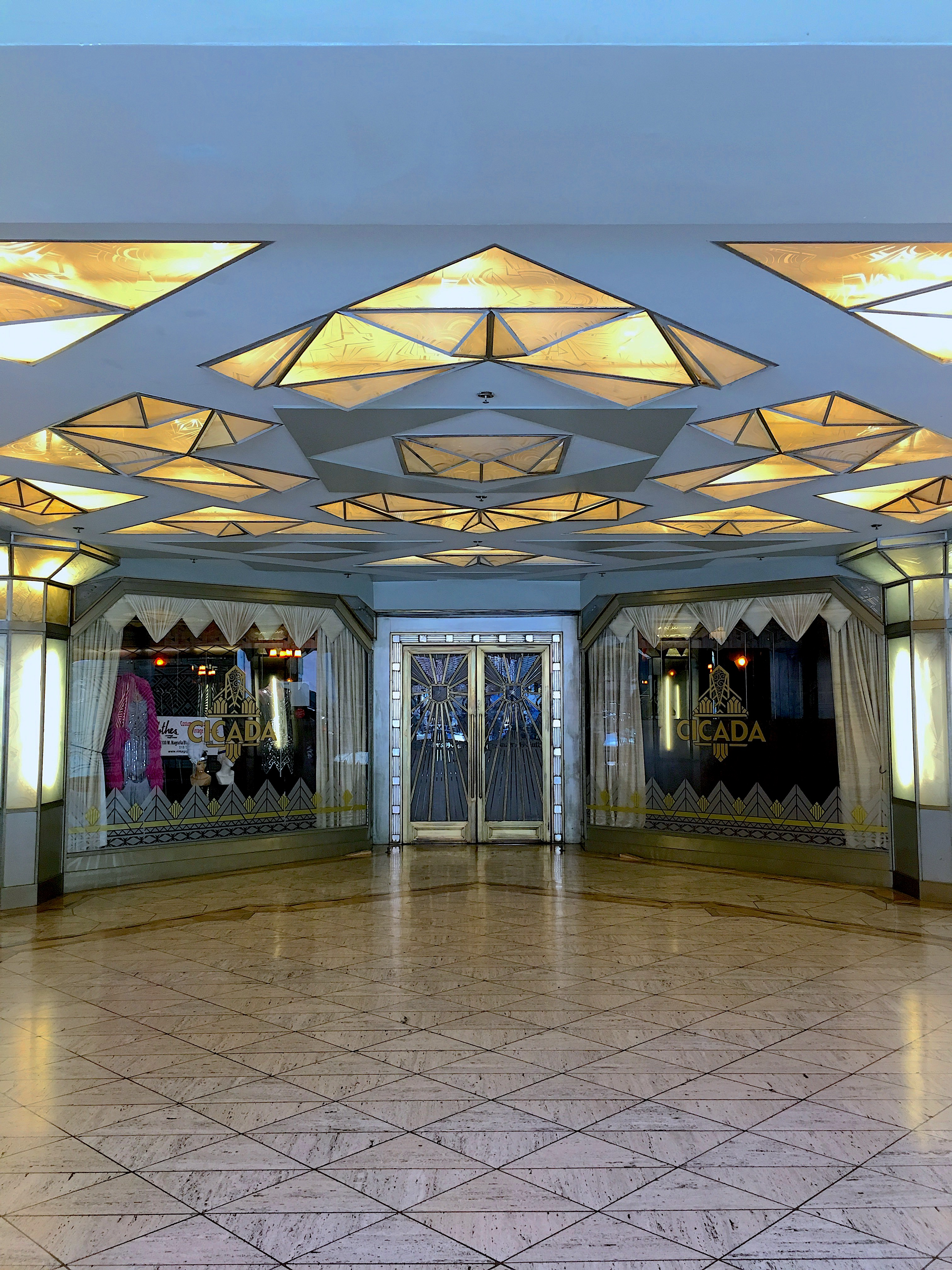

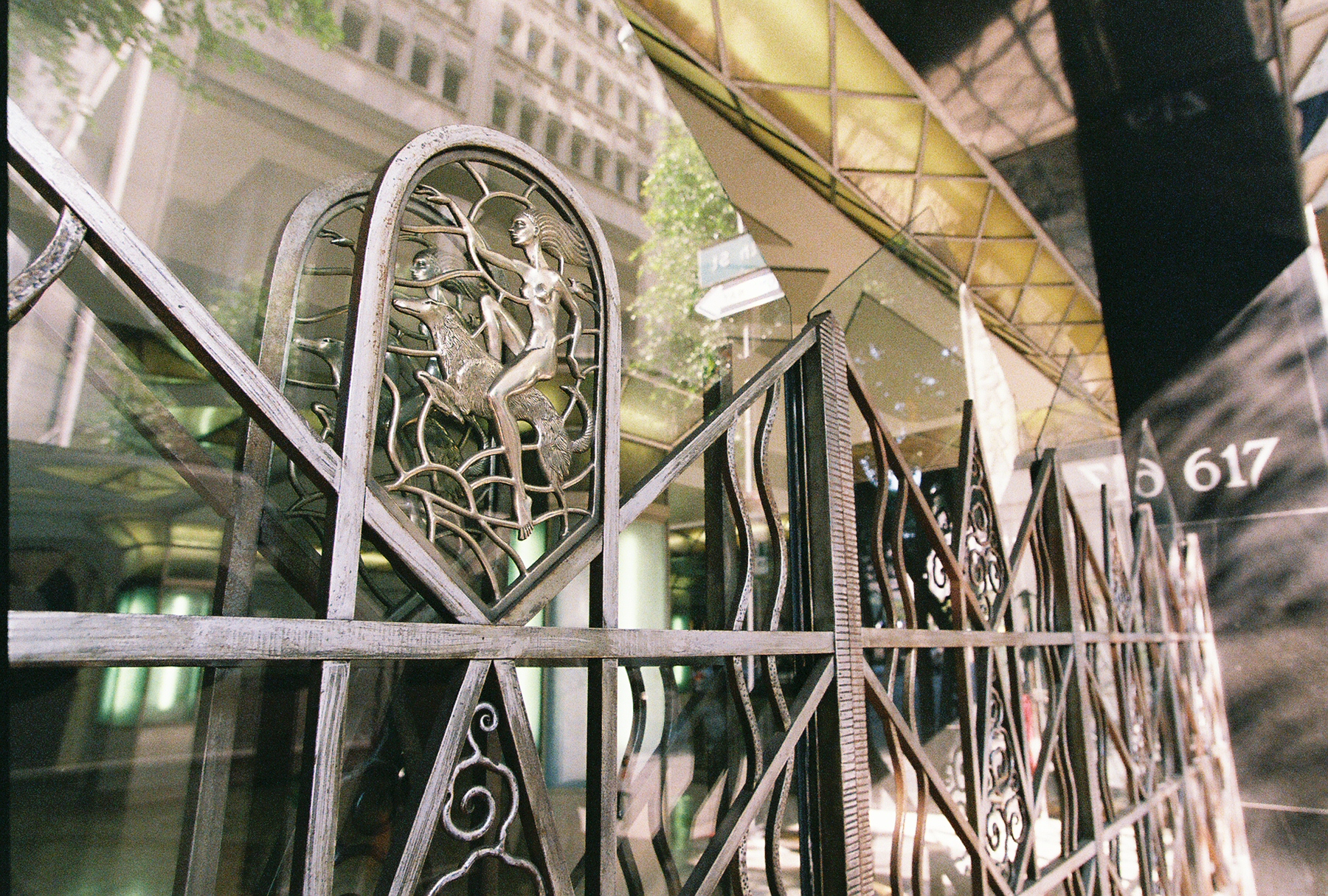
Detail of gates in the arcade of the Oviatt Building

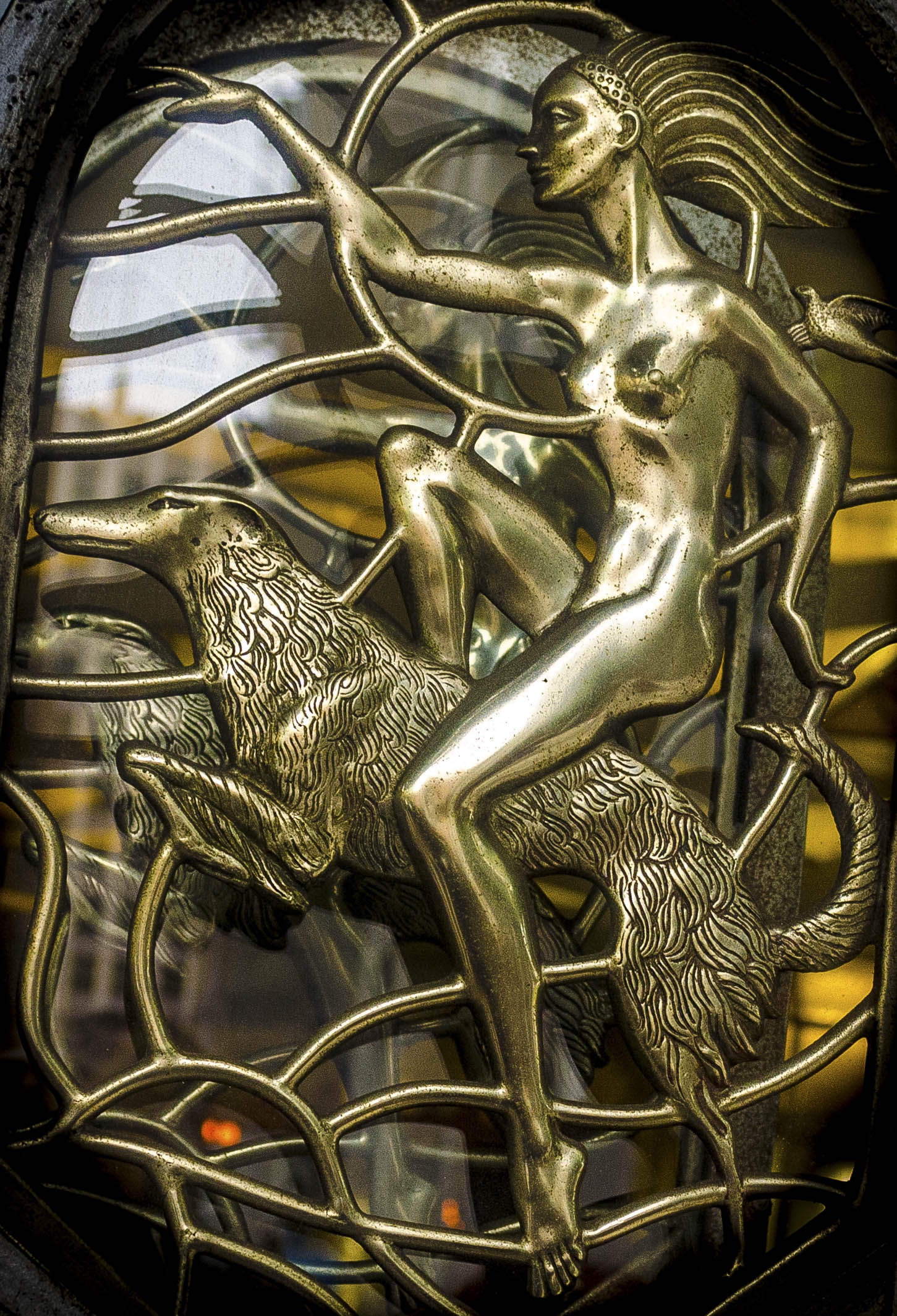
Art Deco gate decoration of the James Oviatt Building

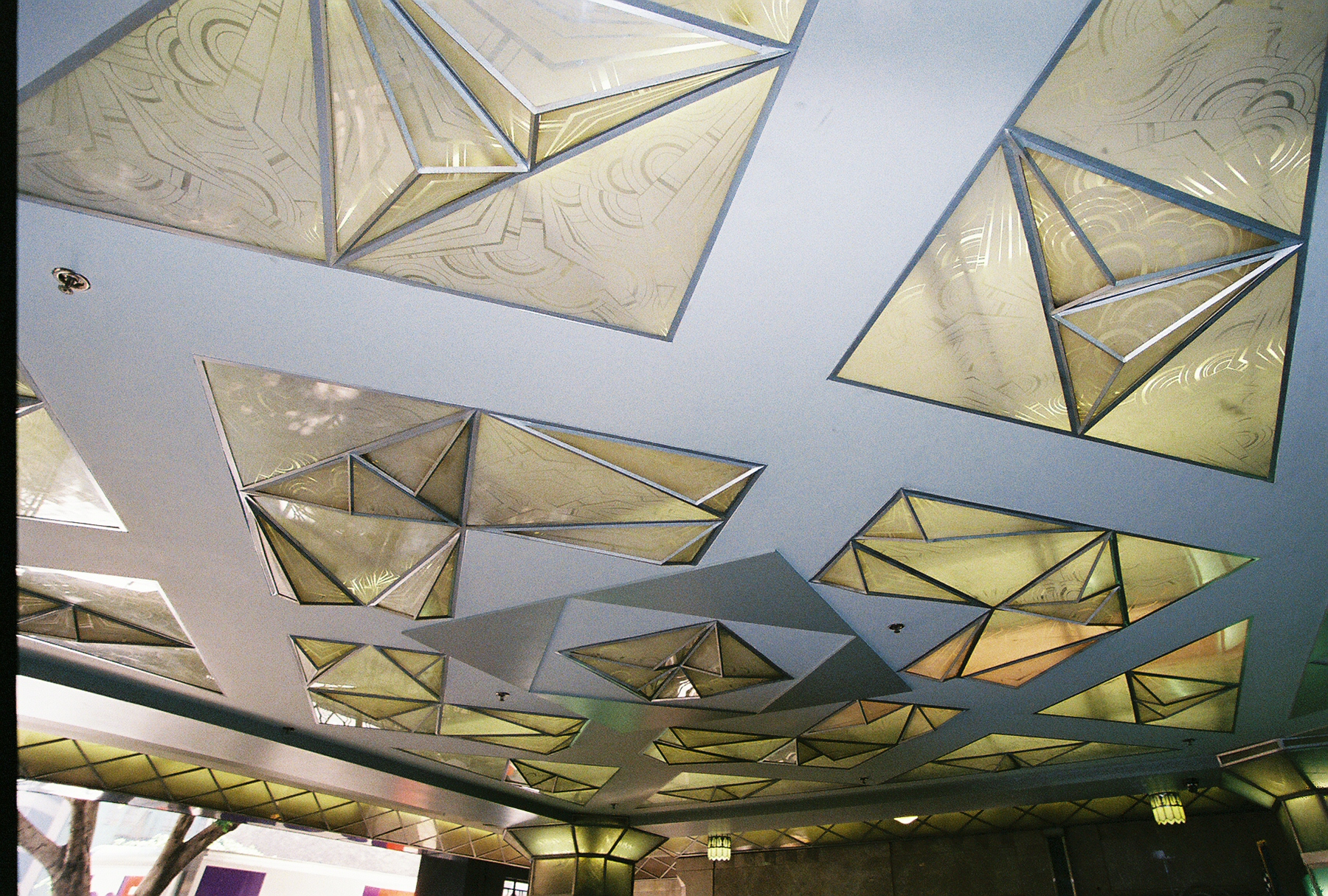
Glass arcade ceiling over the entrance of the Oviatt Building

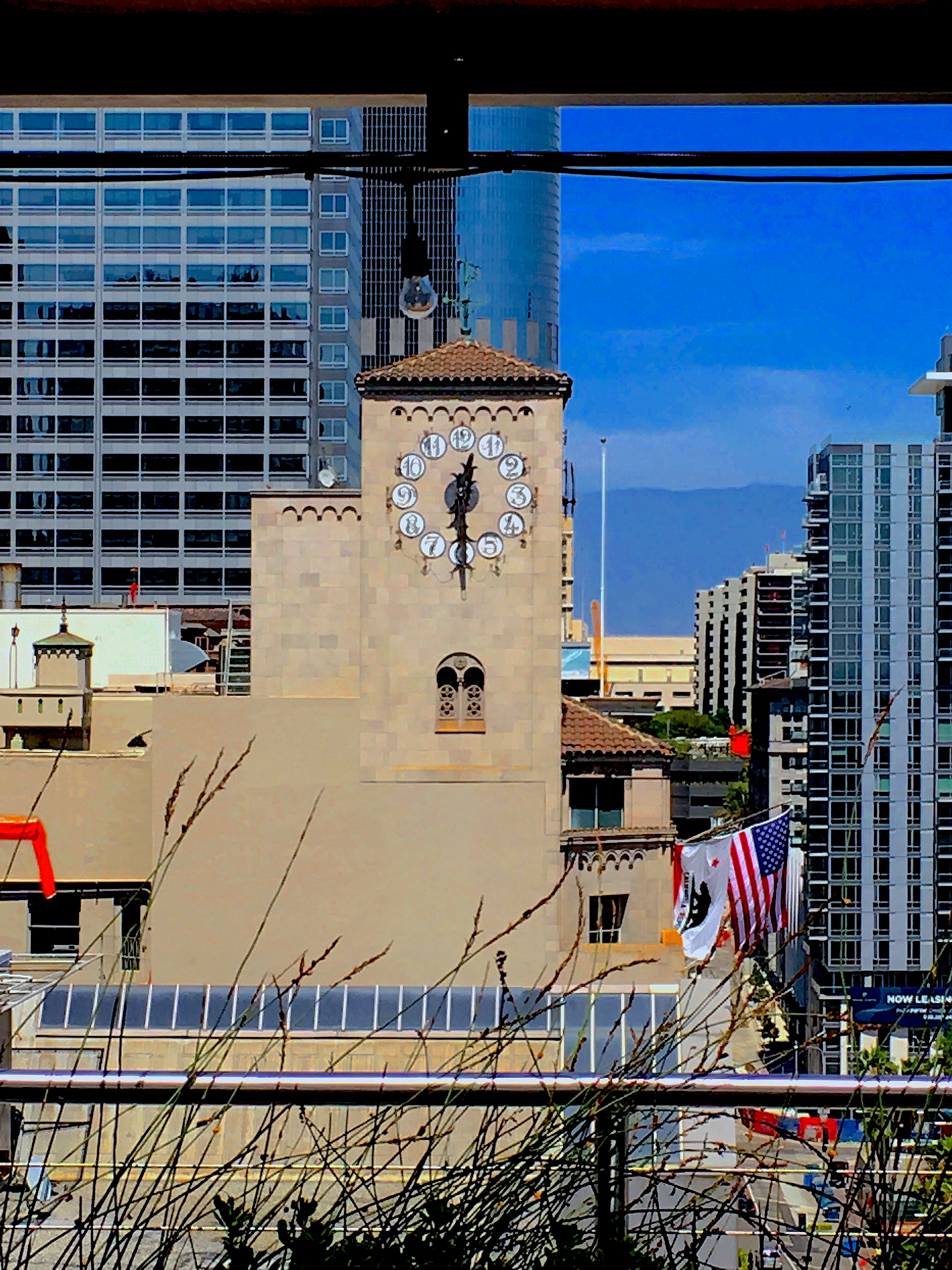
Clocktower

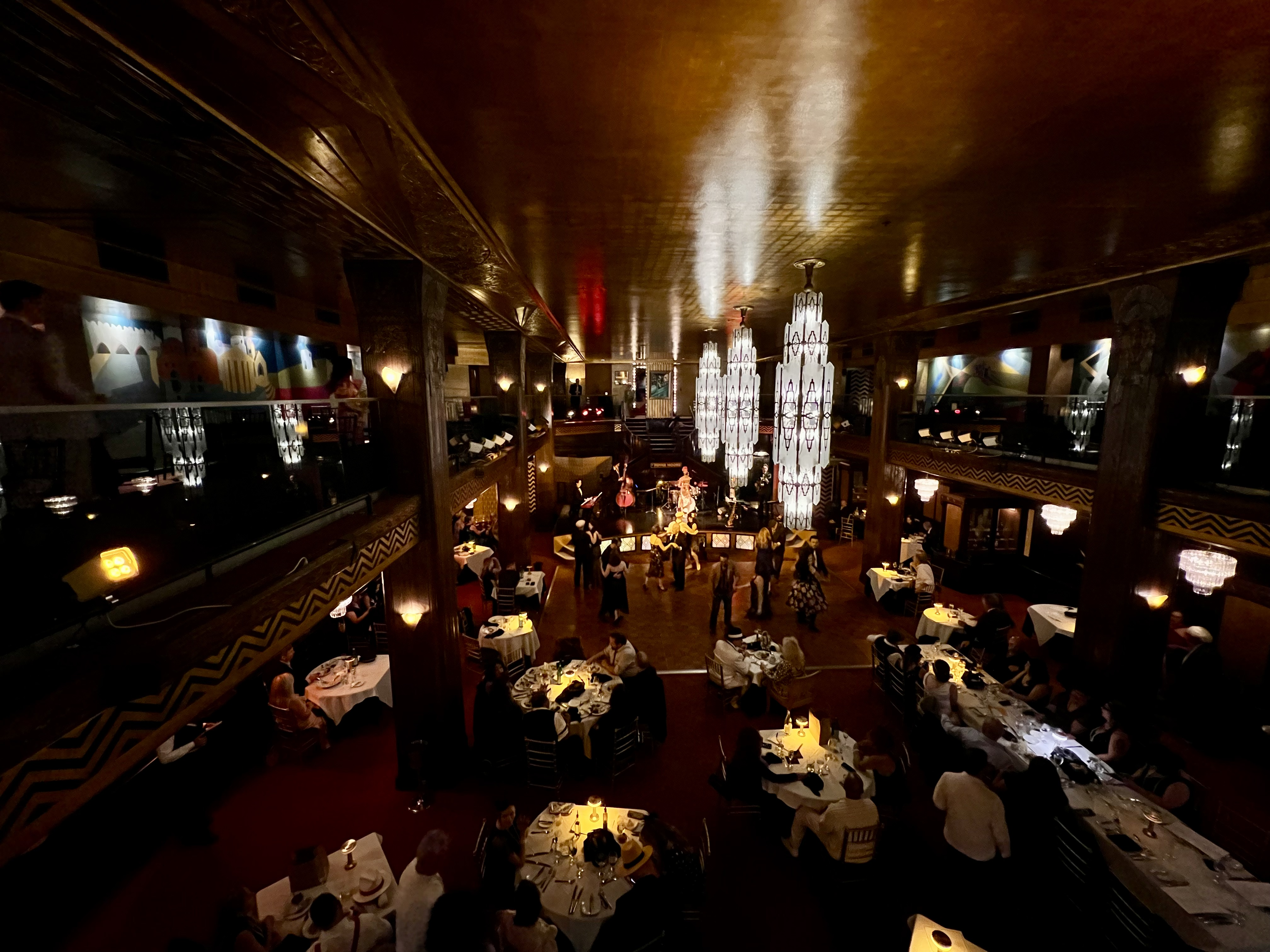
View of the main floor, now used as the Cicada Restaurant and Lounge

== In popular culture ==
In the 1943 novel The Lady in the Lake by Raymond Chandler, the fictional "Treloar Building" on Olive Street near Sixth, with its "vast black and gold lobby" and elegant style, is often taken as a description of the Oviatt Building.

A feature-length documentary on the Oviatt Building's history was directed by Seth Shulman and written/produced by Marc Chevalier in 2008.

In 2015, the exterior of the Cicada was used as the exterior for the fictional Hotel Cortez on American Horror Story: Hotel.

The Cicada featured in various films such as Bruce Almighty, Don't Worry Darling and the Oscar-winning Mank.

Under the Rose Productions, an LA based theatre company produced an immersive play entitled Castle in the Sky, loosely based on James Oviatt's residency in the top floor penthouse apartment during prohibition. A short making-of documentary is included as bonus material with the feature-length documentary.

== See also ==
- List of Registered Historic Places in Los Angeles
- List of Los Angeles Historic-Cultural Monuments in Downtown Los Angeles
