= Barker Brothers Building =

Historic building in Los Angeles, California

- U.S. Historic district – Contributing property
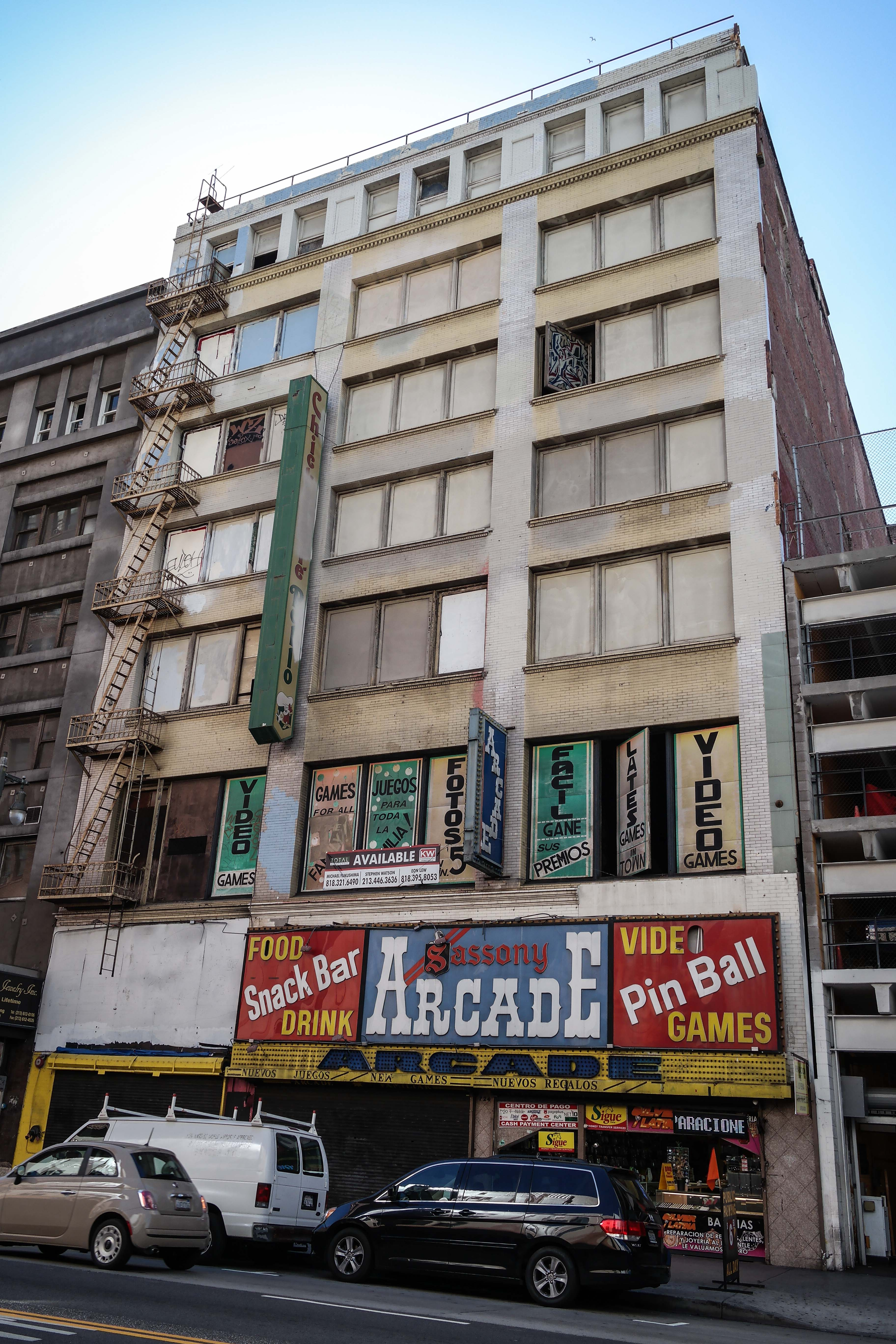
- The building in 2014

- Location within the Los Angeles metropolitan area
- Location: 722 S. Broadway, Los Angeles, California
- Coordinates: 34°02′41″N 118°15′13″W
- Built: 1909
- Architect: Robert Brown Young
- Part of: Broadway Theater and Commercial District (ID79000484)
- Designated CP: May 9, 1979

Barker Brothers Building, also known as Sassony Building and The Barker, is a historic seven-story building located at 722 S. Broadway in the Broadway Theater District in the historic core of downtown Los Angeles. The building's original tenant was Barker Bros., for which it is named after.

== History ==
Barker Brothers Building, built in 1909, was designed by Robert Brown Young, the architect responsible for several buildings on Broadway, including O. T. Johnson Block, Forve-Pettebone Building, J. E. Carr Building, Lankershim Hotel, and Gebhard Building, and built by Clara Burdette. The building's original tenant was Barker Bros., who were headquartered in the building from 1909 to 1926. Upon opening, the building was marketed as "California's largest popular priced furniture store."

In 1979, the Broadway Theater and Commercial District was added to the National Register of Historic Places, with Barker Brothers Building listed as a contributing property in the district.

Barker Brothers Building was sold for $7.8 million in 2013 ($10.8 million in 2025) and $8.4 million in 2014 ($11.4 million in 2025). In 2016, Satila Studios bought the building, after which they rehabilitated it and converted it into offices with ground floor retail. The rehabilitation was part of the Bringing Back Broadway initiative.

== Architecture and design ==
Barker Brothers Building is made of steel, concrete, and brick with a pressed-brick facade. The building originally featured cornice and lugsills, but they were removed. The United States Department of the Interior described the building as "plain but restorable" when they included it as a contributing property in the Broadway Theater and Commercial District.

The building's interior features dark wood flooring and a grand stairway with large-scale archways and wooden columns.

== See also ==
- List of contributing properties in the Broadway Theater and Commercial District
