= List of contributing properties in the Broadway Theater and Commercial District =

The properties on this list are contributing properties to Los Angeles's Broadway Theater and Commercial District, which was added to the National Register of Historic Places in 1979 and expanded in 2002. The period of significance is 1894 to 1931.

Listed Name	Alternate Name	Image	Address	Type	Style	Architect	Year built	Additional information
Victor Clothing Company	City Hall North, Hosfield Building, Victor Clothing Lofts		242 S. Broadway	Government then retail	Vernacular with Beaux-Arts elements	Train & Williams	1914	Added to district in 2002. Residential conversion in the 2000s.
Bradbury Building			304 S. Broadway	Office	Italian Renaissance Revival	George Wyman	1893	NRHP No. 71000144, LAHCM No. 6
Trustee Building			340 S. Broadway	Office and retail		Parkinson and Bergstrom	1905	
Judson-Rives Building	Broadway Central Building, The Judson		424 S. Broadway	Office and retail, theater from 1924-1988	Beaux Arts	Charles Ronald Aldrich	1906	LAHCM No. 881. Residential conversion in 2008.
Bumiller Building			430 S. Broadway		Renaissance Revival	Morgan & Walls	1906	
Chester Williams Building			215 W. 5th Street	Office	Beaux Arts	Curlett & Beelman	1926	Residential conversion in 2012
Jewelry Trades Building	Title Guarantee Block		220 W. 5th Street	Retail	Romanesque	Morgan, Walls and Morgan	1912	Residential conversion in 2010
O. T. Johnson Building No. 2	Forve-Pettebone Building		510 S. Broadway	Office		Robert Brown Young	1905	LAHCM No. 1125
Roxie Theater			518 S. Broadway	Theater	Art Deco	John M. Cooper	1931	LAHCM No. 526
Cameo Theater	Clune's Broadway Theatre		528 S. Broadway	Theater	Beaux Arts interpretation of Italian Renaissance	Alfred Rosenheim	1910	LAHCM No. 524
Arcade Theater	Pantages Theatre		534 S. Broadway	Theater	Beaux-Arts	Morgan & Walls	1910	LAHCM No. 525
Arcade Building	Broadway-Spring Arcade		540 S. Broadway	Office and retail	Spanish Renaissance and Beaux Arts	Kenneth A. MacDonald Jr.	1924	Also contributes to the Spring Street Financial District. Residential conversion in 2010.
Hubert-Thom McAn Building	Eden Hotel		546 S. Broadway	Hospitality then office	Italianate	John B. Parkinson	1900	
Silverwood's Building			558 S. Broadway	Retail		Walker & Eisen	1920	
Finney's Cafeteria	Gebhart Building, Eshman Building, The Chocolate Shop, Museum of Chocolate		217 W. 6th Street	Food-service	German/Dutch interior	Plummer and Feil (1913)	1904, 1913	LAHCM No. 137
Walter P. Story Building	New Story Building		610 S. Broadway	Office and retail	Beaux Arts	Morgan & Walls	1908	
Desmond's Building	Desmond's Department Store		614 S. Broadway	Retail	Spanish Baroque / Beaux Arts	Albert C. Martin Sr.	1924	LAHCM No. 1207. Office conversion in 2018.
Broadway Cafeteria	Schaber's Cafeteria		618 S. Broadway	Food-service	Spanish Colonial	Charles F. Plummer	1928	Retail conversion sometime after 2012
Palace Theater	Orpheum Theatre, Broadway Palace, Fox Palace		636 S. Broadway	Theater	French Renaissance	G. Albert Lansburgh	1910	LAHCM No. 449
Forrester Building			638 S. Broadway	Residential		Charles Frederick Whittlesey	1907	
J. E. Carr Building	Brooks Building		644 S. Broadway	Commercial	Renaissance Revival	Robert Brown Young	1908	
Yorkshire Hotel	J. D. Hooker Building		710-714 S. Broadway	Hospitality		Parkinson and Bergstrom	1909	Residential conversion in 1972
Parmelee Building			716 S. Broadway	Office and retail			1907	
Barker Brothers Building	Sassony Building, The Barker		722 S. Broadway	Retail		Robert Brown Young	1909	Office conversion in 2016
Globe Theater	Morosco Theatre, Garland Building		744 S. Broadway	Theater and office	Beaux-Arts	Morgan, Walls and Morgan	1912	
Chapman Building	Los Angeles Investment Company Building, Charles C. Chapman Building, The Chapman, Chapman Flats		756 S. Broadway	Office	Beaux-Arts	Ernest McConnell	1911	LAHCM No. 899. Residential conversion in 2007.
Tower Theater			802 S. Broadway	Theater	French Renaissance	S. Charles Lee	1927	LAHCM No. 450; Retail conversion in 2021.
Singer Building	Allied Arts Building		806 S. Broadway	Retail	Italian Renaissance	Meyer & Holler	1922	Residential conversion in 2018
Rialto Theater	Quinn's Rialto Theater, Grauman’s Rialto		812 S. Broadway	Theater	Greek Revival (1917) changed to Georgian (1923), Art Deco marquee	Oliver Perry Dennis (1917), William Lee Woollett (1923)	1917, 1923	LAHCM No. 472
Apparel Center Building	Wurlitzer Building, Anjac Fashion Building, Hudson Building		814 S. Broadway	Office	Spanish Renaissance	Walker & Eisen	1923	
Braun Building			820-822 S. Broadway	Office		Walter Jesse Saunders	1913	
Anjac Fashion Building	Platt Building		830 S. Broadway	Office	Gothic Revival	Walker & Eisen	1927	
Orpheum Theater			842 S. Broadway	Theater	Spanish Renaissance	Schultze & Weaver, G. Albert Lansburgh	1925	
Blackstone's Department Store	U.S. Post Office Metropolitan Station		901-10 S. Broadway	Retail	Beaux Arts	John B. Parkinson	1918	Added to district in 2002. LAHCM No. 765. Residential conversion in 2010.
Broadway Leasehold Building	L.L. Burns Western Costume Building, Sparkle Factory		908-10 S. Broadway	Office	Gothic Revival	Unknown or Meyer and Holler	1914	Added to district in 2002
Western Costume Building	939 South Broadway Building, 939 Broadway Lofts, Anjac Fashion Building		939-47 S. Broadway	Industrial	Renaissance Revival with Gothic Revival imagery and Art Deco forms and massing	Kenneth A. MacDonald Jr.	1925	Added to district in 2002. Residential conversion in 2018.
United Artists Theater Building	California Petroleum Corporation Building, Texaco Building, Ace Hotel, STILE Downtown Los Angeles		921-37 S. Broadway	Theater and office	Gothic Revival / Art Deco	Walker & Eisen (building), C. Howard Crane (theater)	1927	Added to district in 2002. LAHCM No. 523. Hospitality conversion in 2014.
Ninth and Broadway Building	Anjac Fashion Building		850 S. Broadway	Office and residential	Zigzag Moderne	Claude Beelman	1929	
Eastern Columbia Building			849 S. Broadway	Retail	Moderne	Claude Beelman	1930	LAHCM No. 294. Office conversion in 1957. Residential conversion in 2006.
May Company	Hamburgers/May Company Department Store, Broadway Trade Center		SW 8th and Broadway	Retail	Classical	Alfred Rosenheim	1906	LAHCM No. 459
Merritt Building			301 W. 8th Street	Office and retail	Italian Renaissance	Reid & Reid	1914	
Issacs Building			737-747 S. Broadway	Office	Gothic		1913	
Cheney Block			731 S. Broadway	Retail		S. Charles Lee (1940s)	1913; 1940s	
Woolworth's			719 S. Broadway	Retail	Zigzag Moderne	Weeks & Day (1920)	1920, 1941	
United Building	State Theatre		703 S. Broadway	Theater and office	Spanish Renaissance	Weeks & Day	1920	LAHCM No. 522
Bullock's	Earl, Tehama Building		641 S. Broadway	Retail	Beaux Arts	Parkinson and Bergstrom	1906	Bullock's complex
Pease Building			646 S. Hill Street	Retail	Beaux Arts	Hudson & Munsell	1906	Bullock's complex
Eshman Building	Eschmann Building		345 W. 7th Street	Retail	Beaux Arts	Morgan & Walls	1909	Bullock's complex
Bridge			321 W. 7th Street	Retail	Beaux Arts		1921	Bullock's complex
Gennet Building			640 S. Hill Street	Retail	Beaux Arts and Moderne	Parkinson and Hubbard	1922	Bullock's complex
Hart '24			652-658 S. Hill Street	Retail	Beaux Arts	John and Donald Parkinson	1924	Bullock's complex
Hart '28			Hill and 7th	Retail	Beaux Arts	John and Donald Parkinson	1928	Bullock's complex
Mackey Building			634 S. Hill Street	Retail	Beaux Arts and Moderne	John and Donald Parkinson	1934	Bullock's complex
Bullocks-Hollenbeck	Hollenbeck Block		639 S. Broadway	Retail	Beaux Arts	Morgan & Walls	1912	Bullock's complex
Mailing's			617-619 S. Broadway	Retail	French Renaissance	S. Charles Lee	1930	
Los Angeles Theater			615 S. Broadway Blvd	Theater	French Renaissance	S. Charles Lee, S. Tilden Norton	1931	LAHCM No. 225
Norton Building	Zukors, H. Jeyne Company Building		601-605 S. Broadway	Office and retail	Zigzag Moderne	Parkinson and Bergstrom	1906; 1940	Residential conversion in 2017
Wood Brothers Building			315 W. 6th Street				1922	
Swelldom Building	Sun Drug Company Building, Sun Realty Building		NW 6th and Broadway	Retail	Italian Renaissance	Davis & Davis, Henry F. Withey	1920	
Metropolitan Annex			553 S. Broadway	Office and retail			1923	Only surviving portion of Paramount Theatre
Hartfields	F. and W. Grand Silver Store Building		537 S. Broadway	Retail	Art Deco	Walker & Eisen	1931	LAHCM No. 1155. Office conversion in 2015.
Reed's	Lerners Building		533 S. Broadway	Retail	Art Deco	Philip Barker	1931	
Broadway Interiors	Schulte United Building, Broadway Arts Tower		529 S. Broadway	Retail			1928	Office conversion in 2014
Remick Building			517-519 S. Broadway	Office		Abram M. Edelman	1902	
Fifth Street Store	Shybary Grand Lofts		501-515 S. Broadway	Retail		Alexander Curlett	1927	Residential conversion in 2006
Metropolitan Building			315 W. 5th Street	Retail and office	Beaux Arts	Parkinson and Bergstrom	1913	LAHCM No. 1019. Residential conversion in 2011.
Wilson Building			431 S. Broadway				1909, 1932	
Broadway Mart Center	Broadway Department Store, Junipero Serra State Office Building		401-423 S. Broadway	Retail	Beaux Arts with Italian Renaissance Revival ornamentation	Parkinson and Bergstrom	1913	Office conversion in 1999
Grand Central Market	Homer Laughlin Building		315 S. Broadway	Retail	Beaux Arts	Thornton Fitzhugh (1905)	1897, 1905	LAHCM No. 1183
Million Dollar Theater			307 S. Broadway	Theater and office	Spanish Renaissance	Albert C. Martin Sr. (building), William Lee Woollett (theater)	1917	NRHP No. 78000687, LAHCM No. 1184
Irvine-Byrne Building	Irvine Block, Byrne Building, Giant Penny Building, Pan American Building, Pan American Lofts		249-59 S. Broadway	Office	Beaux Arts	Sumner Hunt (1894), Willis Polk (1911)	1894, 1911	Added to district in 2002. LAHCM No. 544. Residential conversion in 2004.

The following properties were originally listed as contributing, but were removed when the district was expanded in 2002.

Listed Name	Alternate Name	Image	Address	Type	Style	Architect	Year built	Additional information
O. T. Johnson Block			350 S. Broadway	Office	Italianate	Robert Brown Young	1895	
O. T. Johnson Building	O. T. Johnson Block		356 S. Broadway	Office	Romanesque	John B. Parkinson	1902	
Lankershim Hotel			700 S. Broadway	Hospitality		Robert Brown Young	1902	Mostly demolished in the early 1980s
Nelson Building	Grant Building		355 S. Broadway	Office and retail		Frank Van Trees (1897), John Parkinson (1902)	1897, 1902	Reduced to two stories sometime between 1979 and 2005
Karl's	Karl's Shoes		341-345 S. Broadway	Retail		Abram M. Edelman	1903	
