= Wood Brothers =

Wood Brothers may refer to the following:

- Wood Brothers Racing, an American auto racing team
- The Wood Brothers, musical siblings Chris and Oliver Wood
- Wood Brothers TV, TV presenter siblings Danny, Ben and Sam Wood
- Wood Brothers Building, in Los Angeles, California
