= Parmelee Building =

Building in Los Angeles, California

- U.S. Historic district – Contributing property
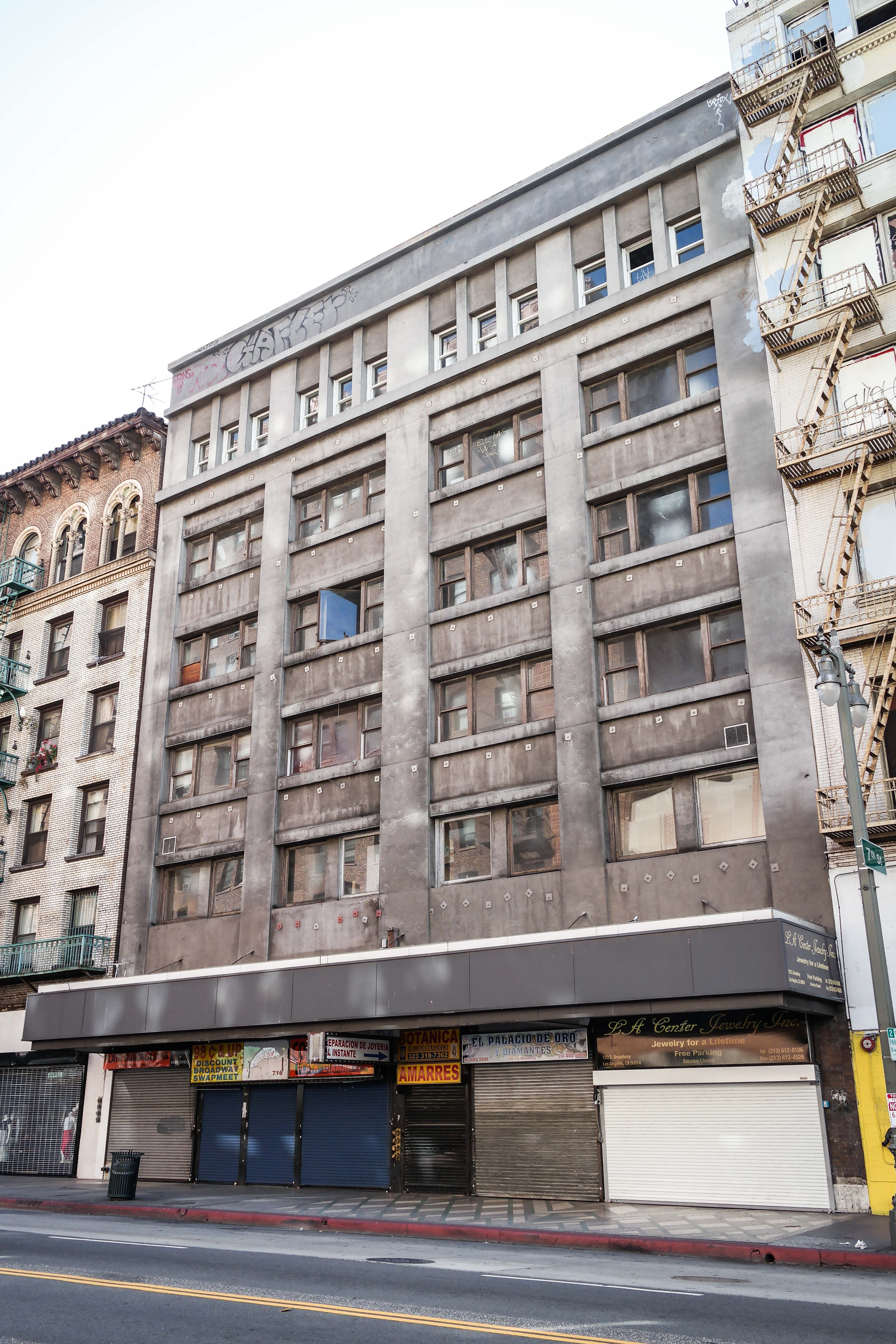
- The building in 2014

- Location within the Los Angeles metropolitan area
- Location: 716 S. Broadway, Los Angeles, California
- Coordinates: 34°02′41″N 118°15′13″W
- Built: 1907
- Architect: Parkinson and Bergstrom
- Part of: Broadway Theater and Commercial District (ID79000484)
- Designated CP: May 9, 1979

Parmelee Building is a historic six-story building located at 716 S. Broadway in the Broadway Theater District in the historic core of downtown Los Angeles.

== History ==
Parmelee Building was built in 1907 and when the Broadway Theater and Commercial District was added to the National Register of Historic Places in 1979, Parmelee Building was listed as a contributing property in the district. The building is primarily an office and retail structure.

The building was restored in 2017, and plans to convert it to residential were abandoned that same year.

== Architecture and design ==
Parmelee Building is made of concrete. As of 1979, its facade was stuccoed over and many of its features, including cornice, were removed.

== See also ==
- List of contributing properties in the Broadway Theater and Commercial District
