= Wilson Building (Los Angeles) =

Building in Los Angeles, California

- U.S. Historic district – Contributing property
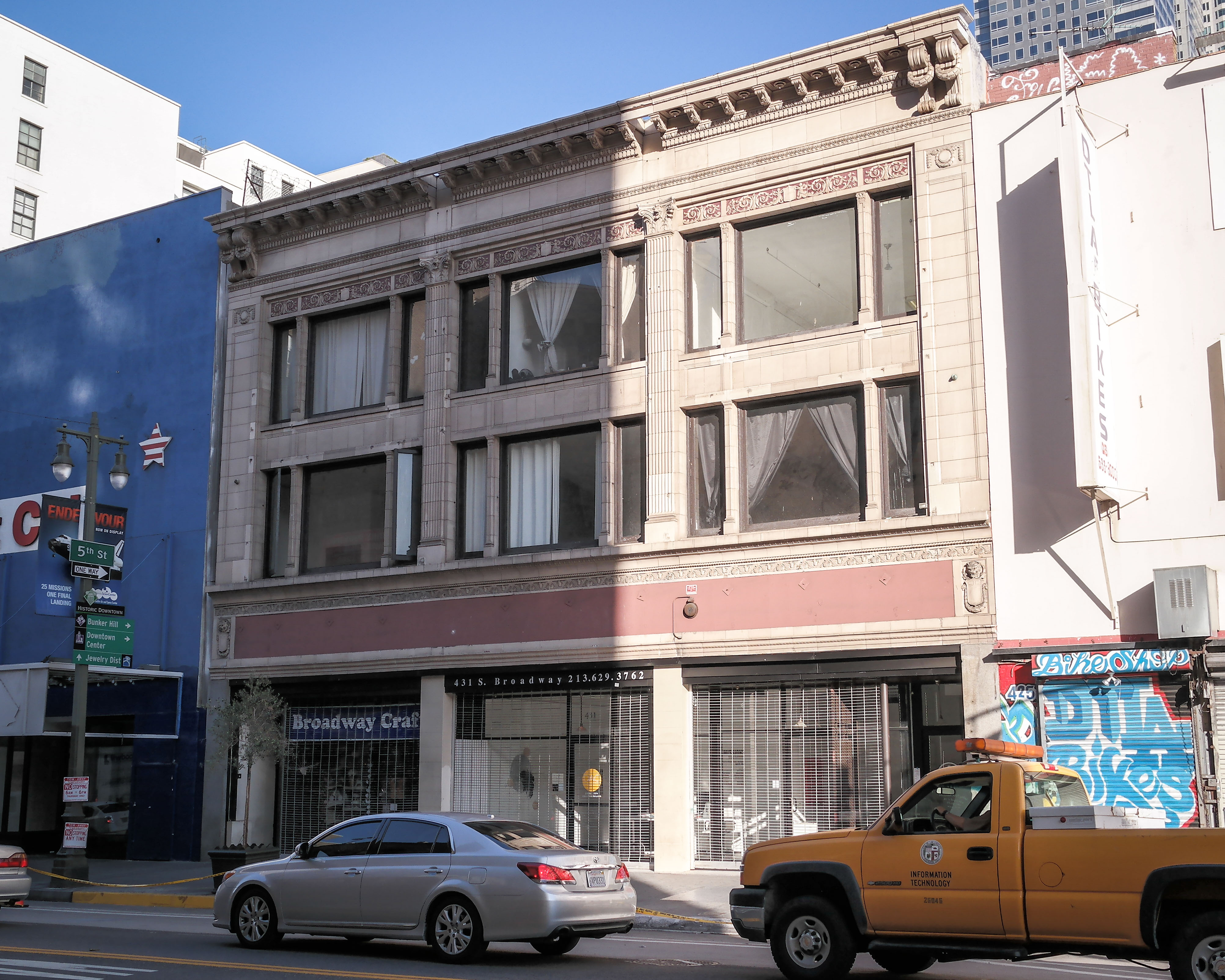
- The building in 2014

- Location within the Los Angeles metropolitan area
- Location: 431 S. Broadway, Los Angeles, California
- Coordinates: 34°02′56″N 118°15′00″W
- Built: 1909
- Part of: Broadway Theater and Commercial District (ID79000484)
- Designated CP: May 9, 1979

Wilson Building is a historic three-story building located at 431 S. Broadway in the Broadway Theater District in the historic core of downtown Los Angeles.

== History ==
Wilson Building was built in 1909 and massively altered in 1932. Woolworth's occupied the building in 1937, with the business and building featuring a 100 yd (91 m) lunch counter, the longest in the world at the time.

In 1979, the Broadway Theater and Commercial District was added to the National Register of Historic Places, with Wilson Building listed as a contributing property in the district.

ECF Art Centers moved into the building in 2014.

== Architecture and design ==
Wilson Building was built with brick and concrete, and features a facade that includes heavy cornice with brackets, columns topped by capitals, and floral designs on the surface.

== See also ==
- List of contributing properties in the Broadway Theater and Commercial District
