= Palace Theater (Los Angeles) =

Historic theater in Los Angeles (e. 1910)

- Palace Theatre
- U.S. Historic district – Contributing property
- Los Angeles Historic-Cultural Monument
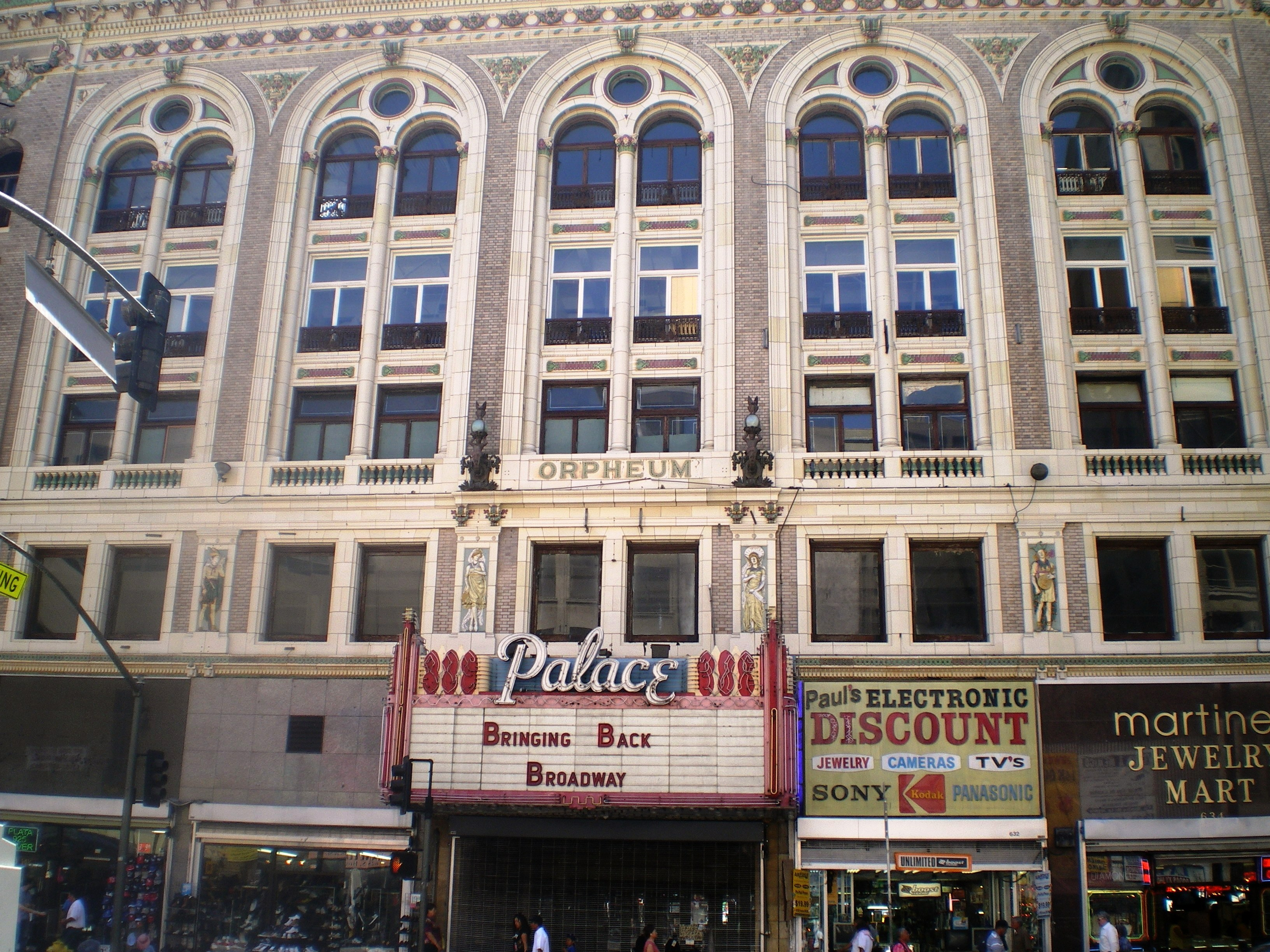
- The building in 2008

- Location within the Los Angeles metropolitan area
- Location: 636 S. Broadway, Los Angeles
- Coordinates: 34.046°N 118.253°W
- Built: 1910
- Architect: G. Albert Lansburgh; Robert Brown Young
- Architectural style: French and Italian Renaissance
- Part of: Broadway Theater and Commercial District (ID79000484)
- LAHCM No.: 449

Significant dates
- Designated CP: May 9, 1979
- Designated LAHCM: August 16, 1989

Palace Theatre, formerly Orpheum Theatre, Orpheum-Palace Theatre, Broadway Palace, Fox Palace, and New Palace Theatre, is a historic five-story theater and office building located at 636 S. Broadway in the Broadway Theater District in the historic core of downtown Los Angeles. It is the oldest theater that remains on Broadway and the oldest remaining original Orpheum theater in the United States.

== History ==
=== Beginnings ===
Downtown Los Angeles's Palace Theatre was originally built as the third home of Los Angeles's Orpheum Circuit. Opened in 1911, the building was designed by G. Albert Lansburgh and Robert Brown Young, the former of whom would later design the nearby Orpheum Theatre, Hollywood Pacific Theatre, and many other theaters across the United States. This theater's seating capacity at opening was slightly less than 2,000.

As the home of Los Angeles's Orpheum Circuit, many notable performers performed here during its early years, including Harry Houdini, Will Rogers, Fred Astaire, and Rita Hayworth. This continued until 1926, when the Orpheum Circuit's fourth home opened a couple blocks away.

=== Conversion to movies ===
In 1926, Palace Theater was converted to a silent movie theater named Broadway Palace, although it did still show less popular vaudeville during this time. Fox West Coast Theatres took over the theater in 1929, after which they converted it to sound and named it Fox Palace. Anthony Heinsbergen led an interior remodel, with the original box seats removed and the interior walls plastered and covered with Candelario Rivas-painted murals. These and other alterations lowered the theater's capacity to around 1,000. Fox West Coast Theatres also added an exterior marquee and they opened the theater's upper balcony to all patrons, as previously the theater was segregated, with the upper balcony only available to African Americans.

In the early-1940s, the theater was briefly operated by Sol Lesser's Principal Theaters Corporation, and by 1943 it was known as the New Palace Theatre. The theater was renamed again on January 24, 1947, to Palace Theatre.

Metropolitan Theatres took over the theater in August 1978, after which it began showing Spanish language and grindhouse movies, then mainstream movies with Spanish subtitles. The theater shut down as a movie theater in late-2000.

=== Historic designation ===
In 1979, Los Angeles's Broadway Theater and Commercial District was added to the National Register of Historic Places, with Palace Theater listed as a contributing property in the district. In 1989, the building was designated Los Angeles Historic-Cultural Monument No. 449.

=== Return to live events ===
After Palace Theater closed as a movie theater, it remained available for private and special events. Broadway Theatre Group then took over and in 2010 they began a $1 million ($1.48 million in 2025) restoration effort. The theater reopened as a live venue in June 2011, although it does still show the occasional movie.

== Architecture and design ==
Palace Theater was designed after an early Renaissance palazzo in Florence, Italy. Built of brick and concrete, the building features a facade covered with multi-colored terra cotta (the first of its kind in California), swags, flowers, fairies, and theater masks, all meant to illustrate the spirit of entertainment. The facade also features four sculpted panels that depict song, dance, music, and drama, all done by Domingo Mora, while the building features arched windows and polychrome cornices, spandrels, keys, and friezes that include an array of ornamentation in the form of bells, harps, grape clusters, and masks.

Palace Theatre's interior design is French and features garland-draped columns and pale pastel colors. The interior lobby also features marble walls and mosaic tiles, and while a carpet at one point covered the decorative flooring, it has since been removed. The building's basement originally featured a paneled men’s smoking lounge and fireplace, and the ladies upstairs lounge a marble fountain. The building's upper-floors, designed for offices, feature large window openings and long and open floorprints.

== Filming location ==
Many movies have shot at Palace Theatre, including The Frank Sinatra Story, Gypsy, The Glimmer Man, The Big Lebowski, and Dreamgirls, as well in Michael Jackson's Thriller.

== See also ==
- List of Los Angeles Historic-Cultural Monuments in Downtown Los Angeles
- List of contributing properties in the Broadway Theater and Commercial District
