= Barker Bros. =

American furniture company (1880–1992)

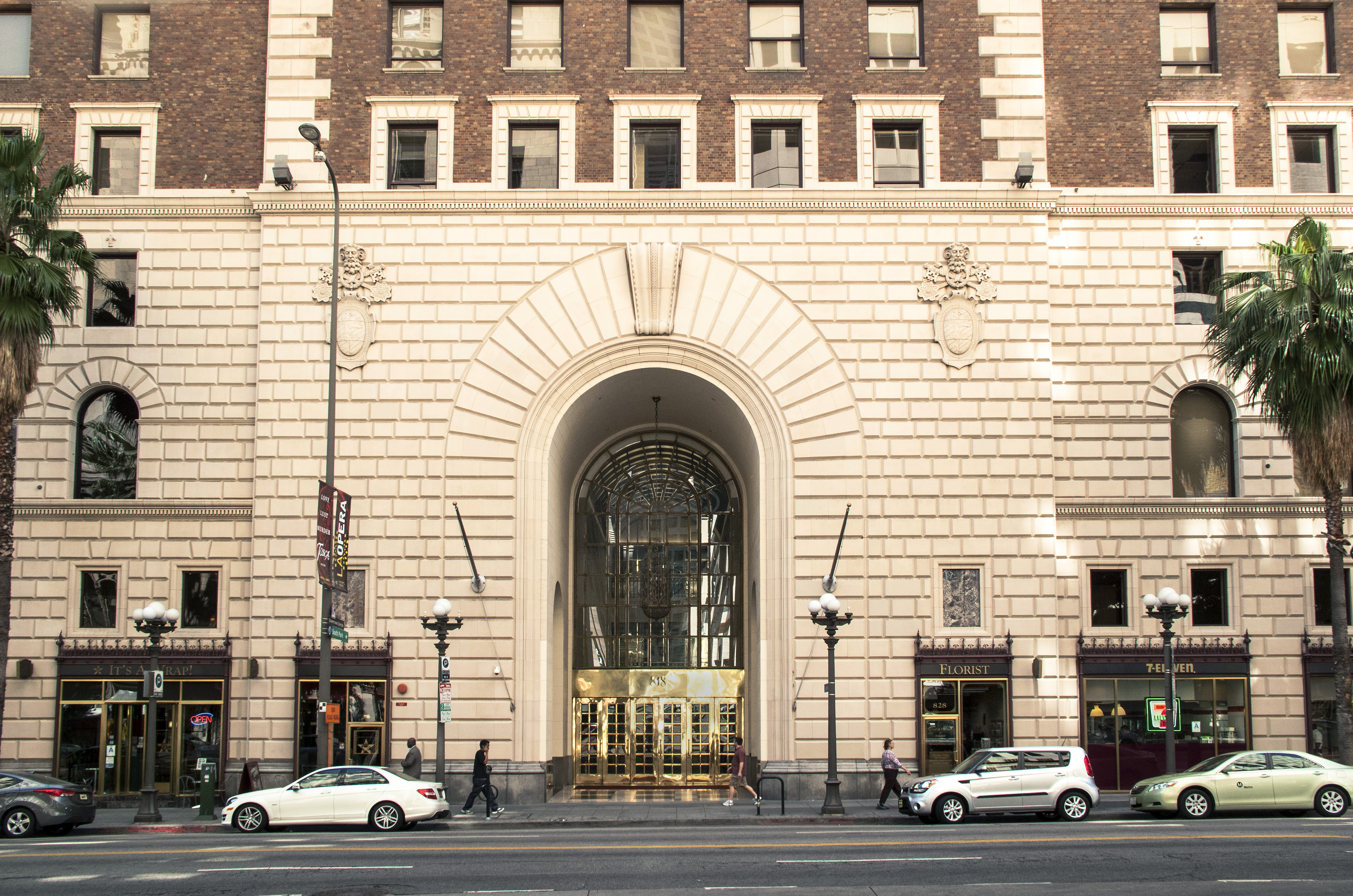
Entrance to former flagship on 7th Street, built 1926, as shown in 2013

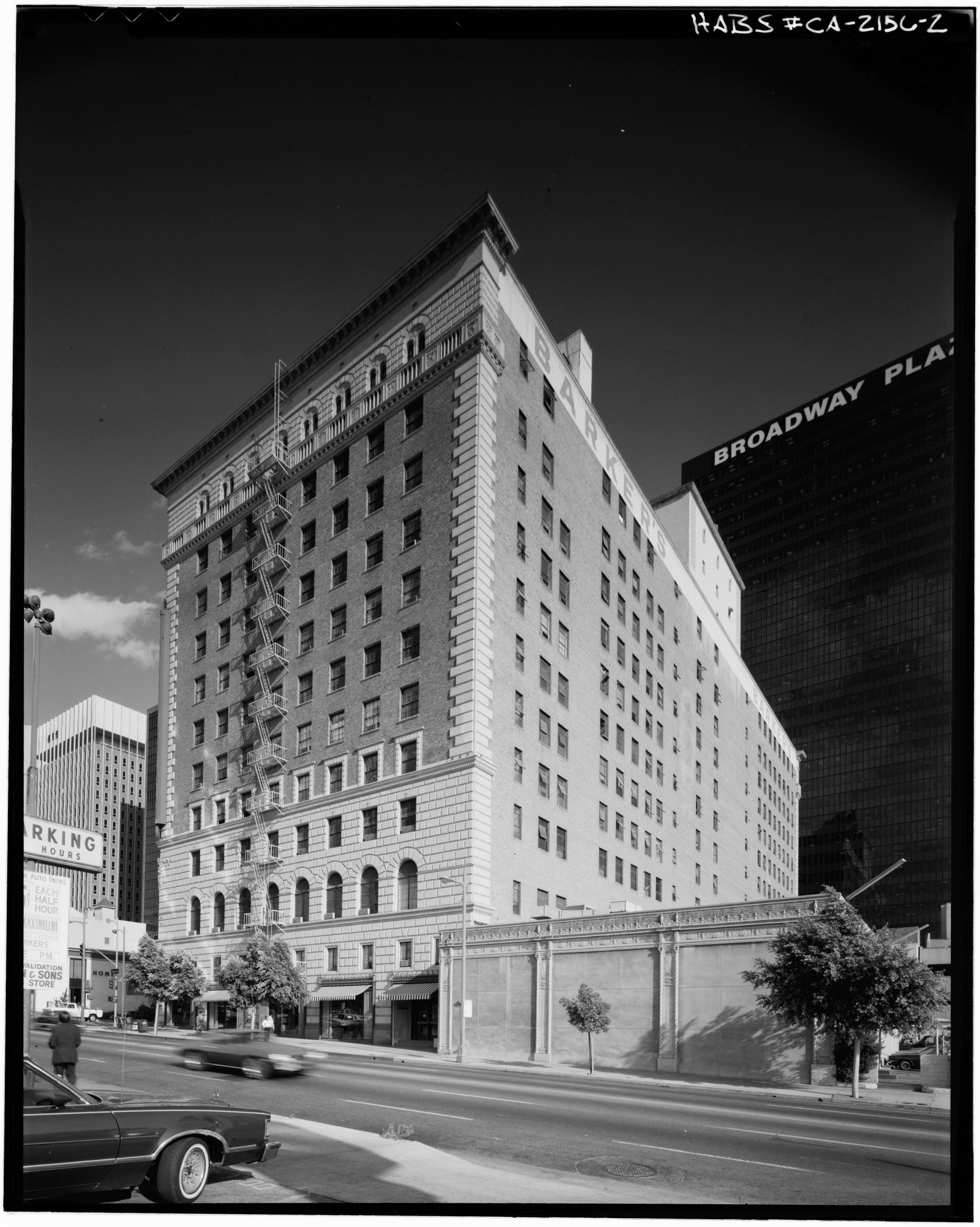
Full view of 7th St. Flagship building as shown in 1980

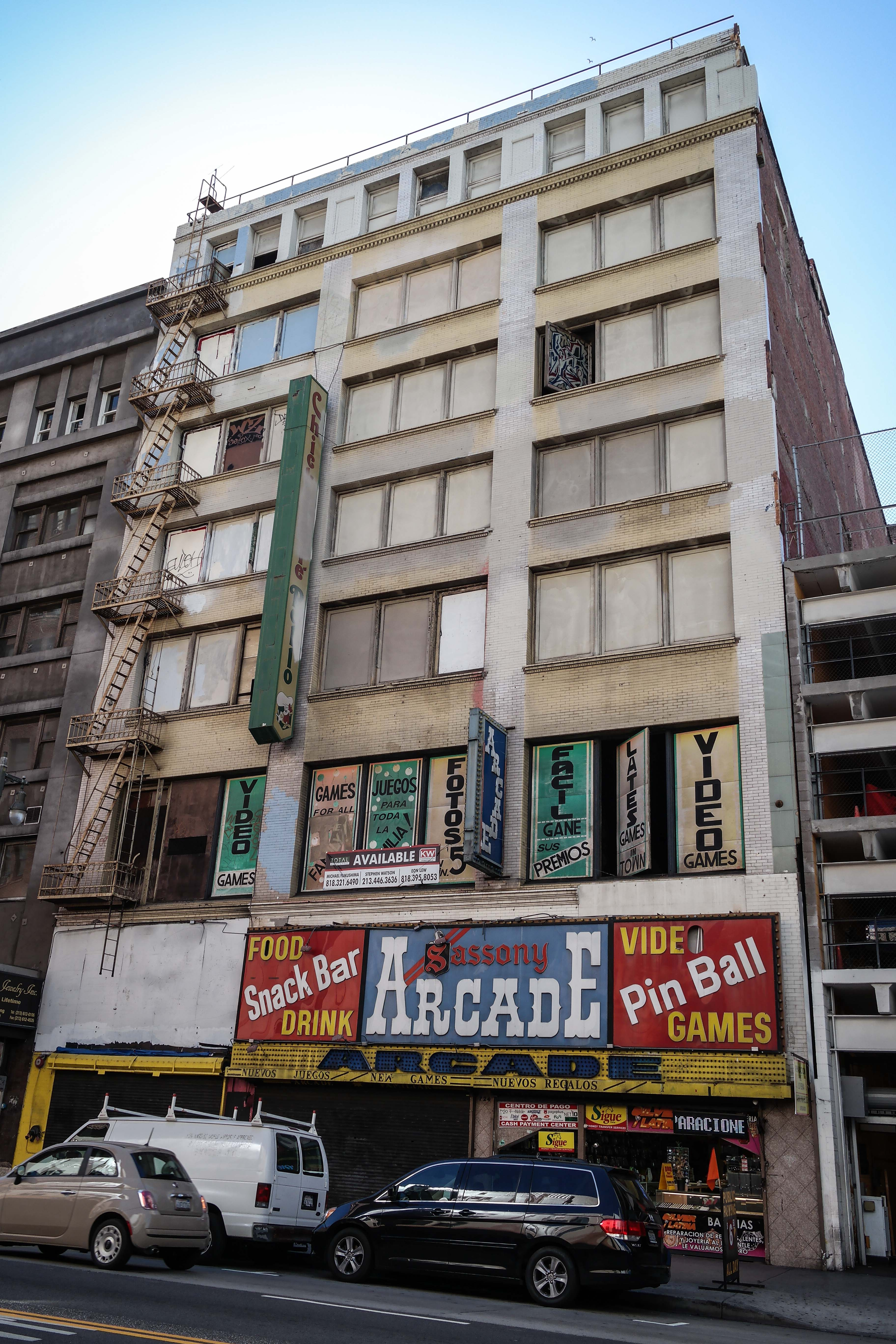
Broadway location of Barker Brothers, 1910-1926, as seen in early 2010s

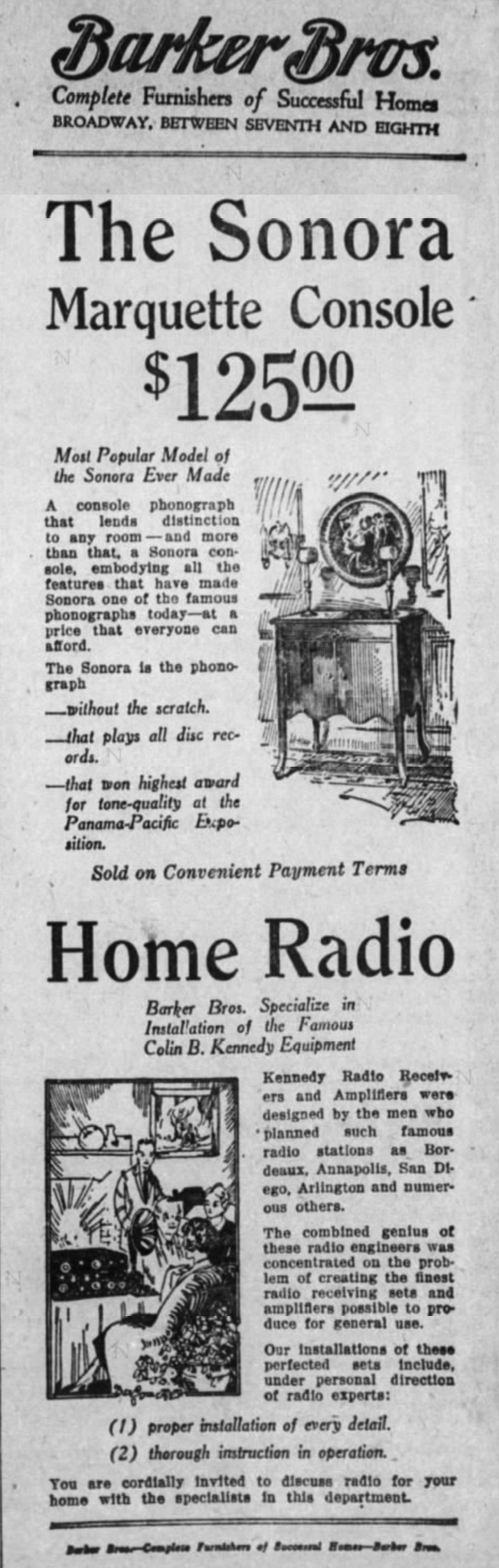
1923 ad for phonographs and radios at Barker Bros.

Barker Bros. was a retailer of furniture, home furnishings, and housewares based in Los Angeles, California, United States. Founded as Barker and Mueller in 1880, the business operated under various names through 1992.

== History ==
Obadiah Truax Barker had owned upholstery and mattress shops in Cincinnati, Ohio, and Grand Rapids, Michigan.

In 1880, Barker was visiting Los Angeles on a trip from Colorado Springs to San Jose, California, when he overheard an outraged Otto Müller at a horticultural exhibition complain about the high cost of furnishing his home from the only large furniture store in the city at the time. Barker approached Müller and together they founded a furniture shop on 112–114 N. Spring Street near the Los Angeles Plaza, called Barker and Mueller.

In 1880, Los Angeles was a town with a population of 11,183. Its population would increase tenfold in the next twenty years, and tenfold again, to over one million, in the 25 years after that.

In 1883, Barker bought out Müller and went into partnership with W. S. Allen, forming Barker & Allen, and moved to the Merced Theatre Building at 8–10 Main Street (pre-1890 numbering), also just off the Los Angeles Plaza. Barker bought out Allen that same year and the firm became O. T. Barker & Sons.

Later the store moved to 3rd & Spring streets at the Stimson Building, Los Angeles' first steel-frame building, where their rent of $1500 was ten times what they had paid on Main Street, a sign of the rapid growth of Los Angeles at the time.

In November 1909, they moved again – done overnight and widely reported – this time to 722 S. Broadway, the area which is now known as the Historic Core, the part of Broadway that was the main commercial street of Los Angeles from around 1910 until World War Two. The store had seven floors, of 150 by 110 feet (46 m × 34 m), plus basement and mezzanine, 150,000 sq ft (14,000 m^{2}) in all. Departments, besides home furniture, included office and bank furniture, floor coverings (carpets, rugs, et al.), draperies mattresses (made in the company's own factories), upholstery, stoves and gas water heaters.

== 1926 flagship store ==
On January 25, 1926, the company moved into an eleven-story building it had built at 818 W. 7th Street, stretching the full south side block from Flower to Figueroa streets, with 23 acres (1,000,000 sq ft) of floor space. A 1931 article reported that they employed 1,444 people (including 432 women).

== Branches ==
The company launched branch stores across Greater Los Angeles and in Bakersfield, with 15 branches by 1955: Hollywood opened in 1927, Long Beach in 1929, plus Glendale, Inglewood, Huntington Park, Santa Monica, Alhambra, Pasadena, Crenshaw, Westwood, Pomona, Van Nuys, Burbank, Santa Ana, Whittier, and Bakersfield, plus a decorator store in Beverly Hills. The company had sales of $30 million at that time, with two-thirds coming from the downtown flagship.

== Epilogue ==
The Downtown flagship closed September 24, 1984. Prisma Capital acquired the company in a leveraged buyout and, having taken on too much debt, caused Barker Bros. to go bankrupt and close in 1992.

== Gallery ==
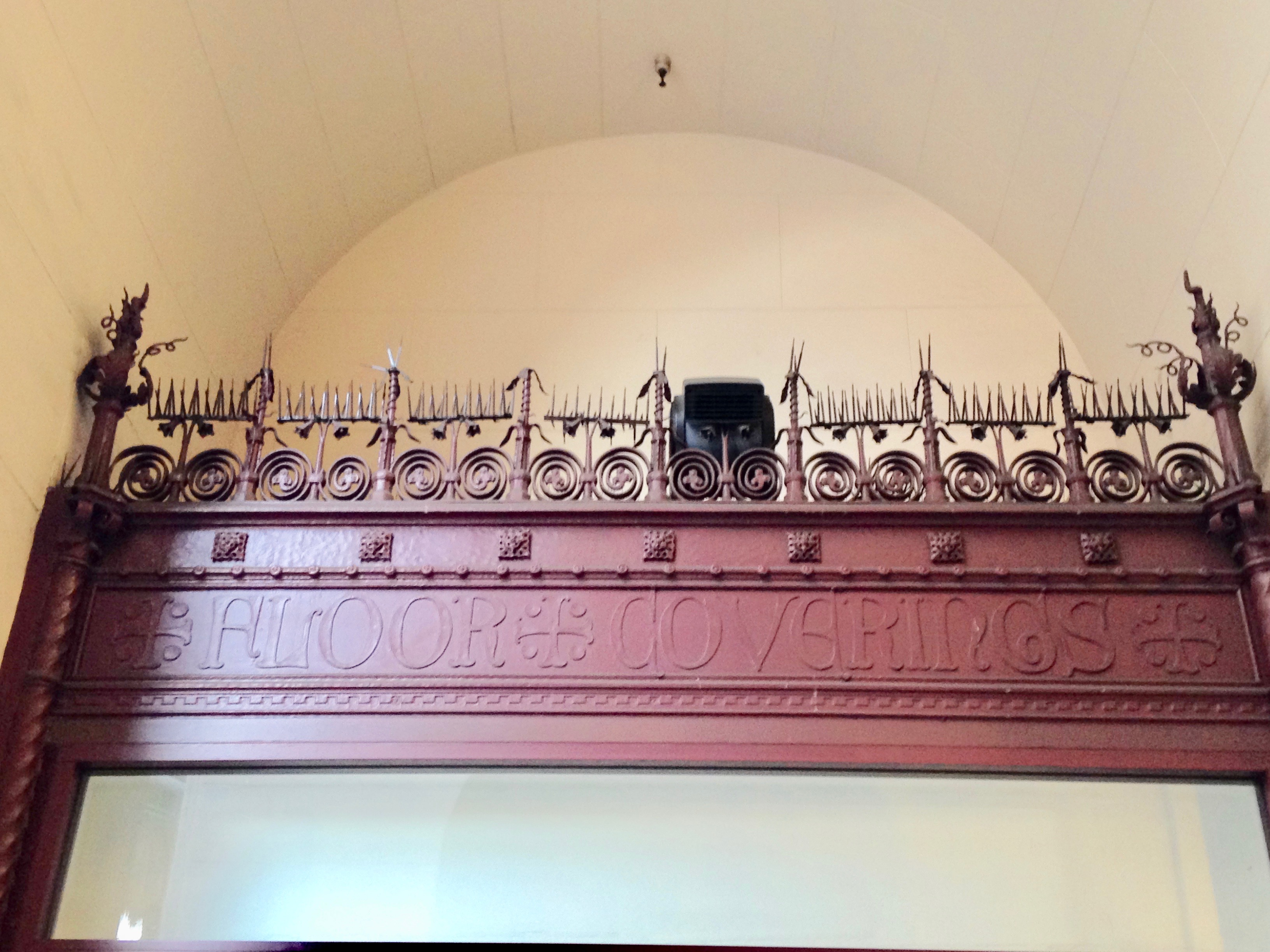
Inside the 7th Street building entryway, a display for floor coverings.

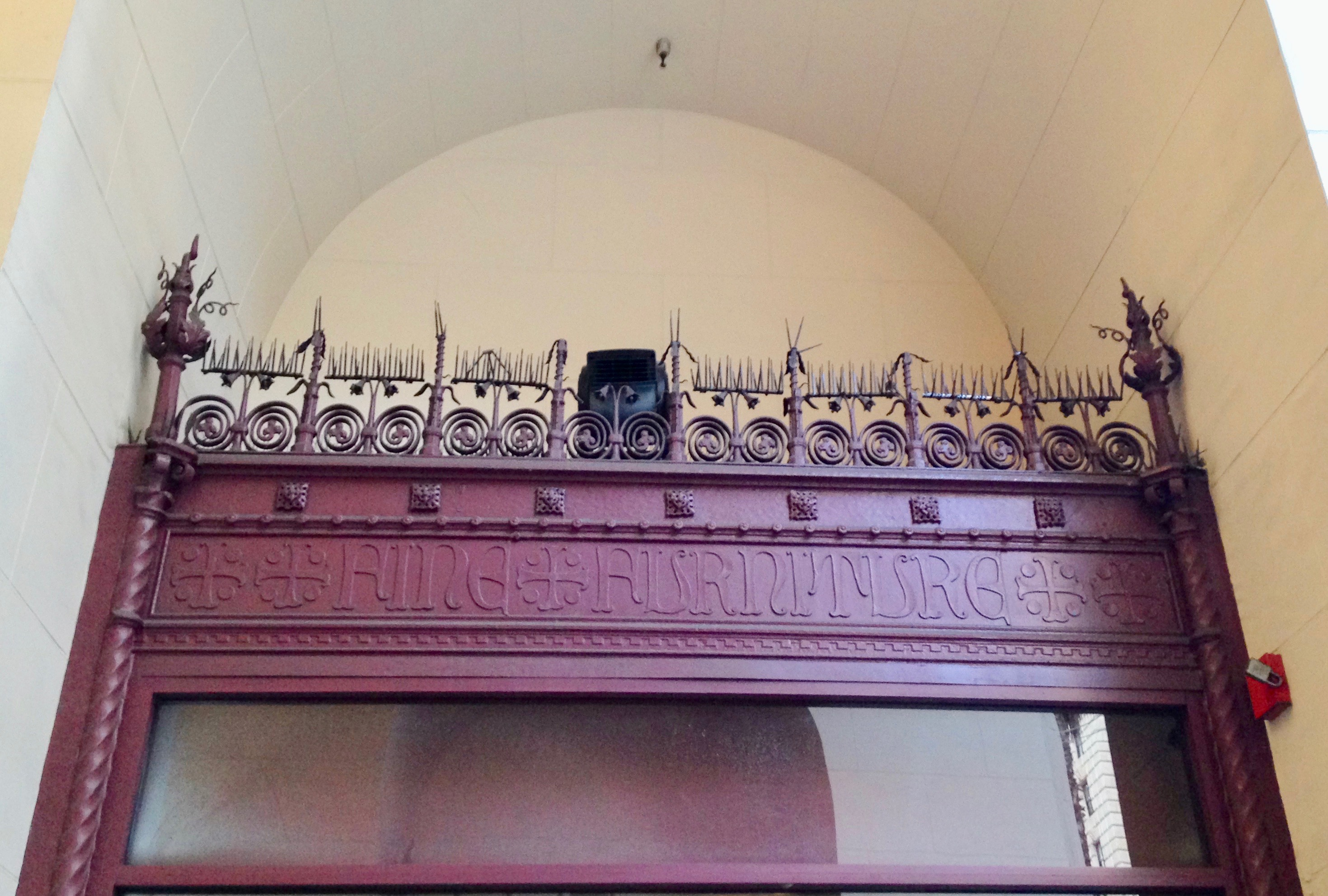
Inside the 7th Street building entryway, a display for fine furniture.
