= Burbank Theatre =

Former theater in Los Angeles, CA

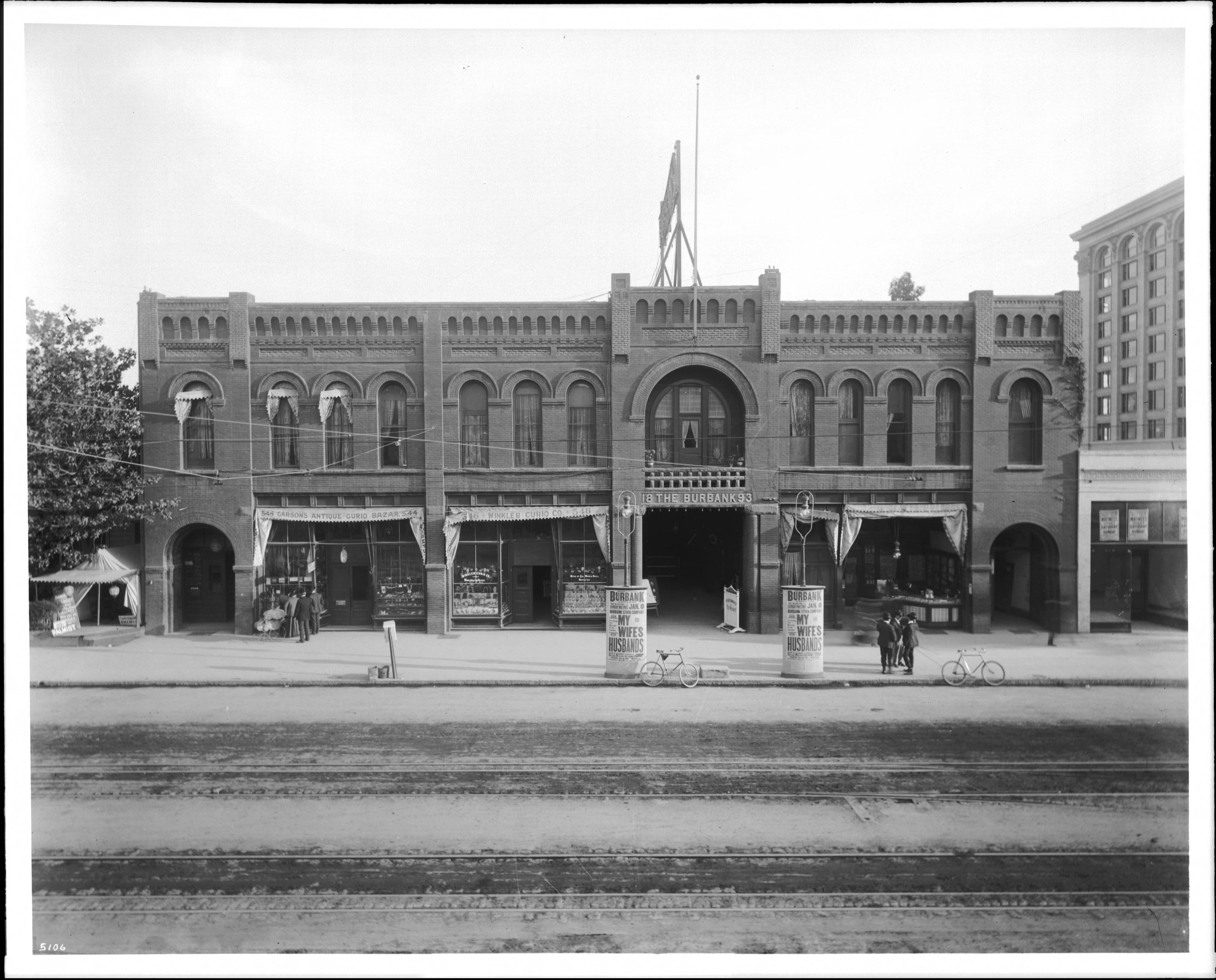
- The building in 1903
- Interactive map of Burbank Theatre
- Address: 548-550 South Main Street; Los Angeles
- Coordinates: 34.0456°N 118.2492°W
- Capacity: 1027
- Type: Live and movie theater

Construction
- Built: 1887
- Opened: 1893
- Renovated: 1915, 1937
- Demolished: 1973 or 1974
- Architect: Robert Brown Young

Burbank Theatre, also known as Morosco's Burbank Theatre, Pelton's Burbank, Gore's Burbank, Burbank Burlesque Theatre, Burbank Follies, and New Follies, was a theater located in downtown Los Angeles.

== History ==
Burbank Theatre, a project of the same David Burbank the San Fernando Valley city of Burbank is named after, was designed by Robert Brown Young. Construction began in 1886, with the theatre opening in 1893. Oliver Morosco leased the theater in 1900 and renamed it Morosco's Burbank Theatre. The theater, with seating for 1,027, was considered one of the major venues in Los Angeles around this time, but was a financial failure until Morosco took it over.

In 1915, the building was remodeled into a movie theater. By 1917, it was named Pelton's Burbank and was home to the New Burbank Musical Comedy Company. By 1921, the theater had been renamed again, this time to Gore's Burbank. In 1937, the theater was redesigned in the Art Deco style and began showing newsreels. By the 1940s, the theater was showing movies and hosting burlesque. From the 1950s onward, the theater was known as Burbank Burlesque Theatre, Burbank Follies, and New Follies.

The theater was demolished in 1973 or March 1974.
