= O. T. Johnson Building =

Building in Los Angeles, California

- O.T. Johnson Building
- Former U.S. Historic district – Contributing property
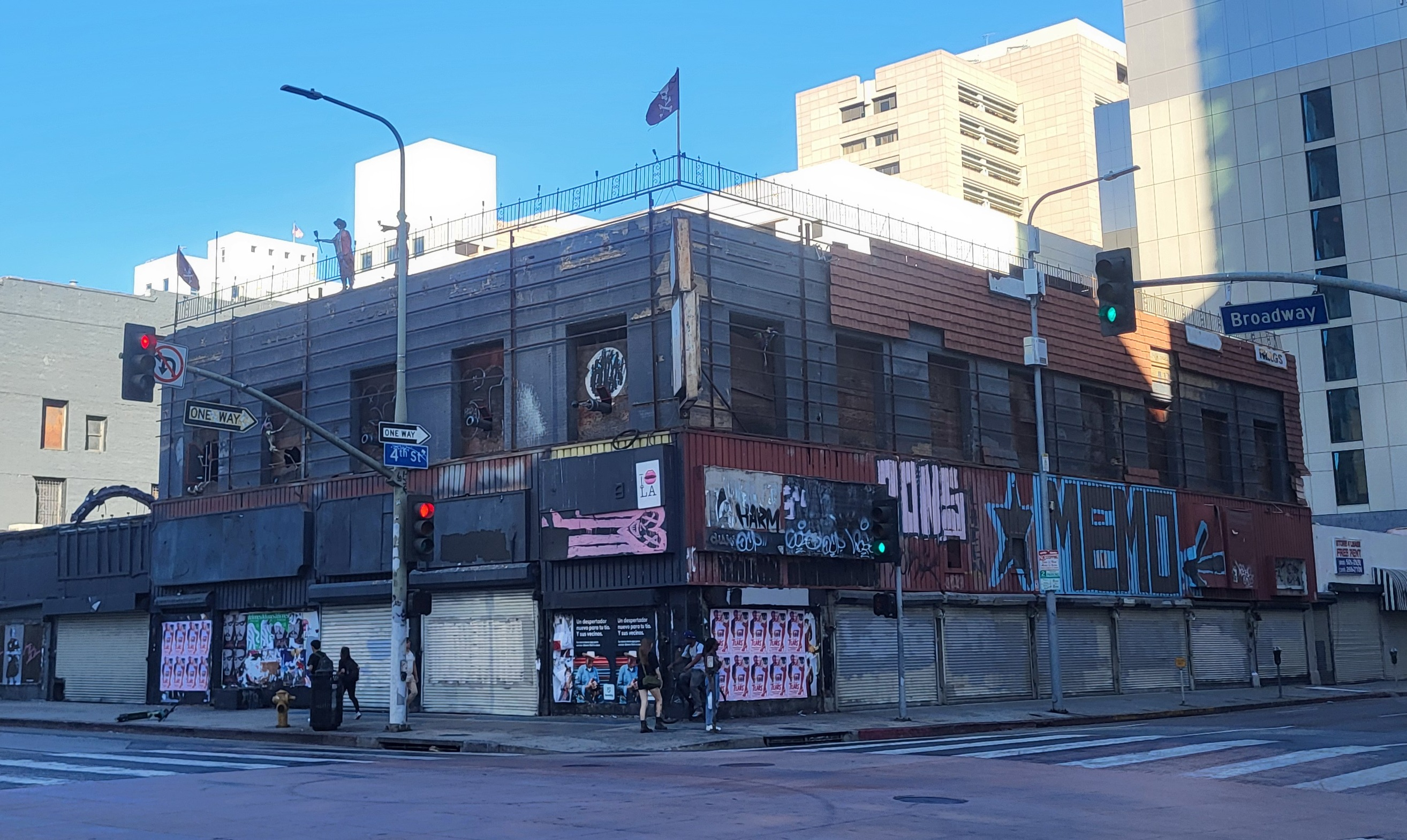
- The building in 2025

- Location within the Los Angeles metropolitan area
- Location: 356 S. Broadway and 224 W. 4th Street, Los Angeles, California
- Coordinates: 34°02′59″N 118°14′57″W
- Built: 1902
- Architect: John B. Parkinson
- Architectural style: Romanesque
- Part of: Broadway Theater and Commercial District (ID79000484)

Significant dates
- Designated CP: May 9, 1979
- Delisted CP: April 12, 2002

O.T. Johnson Building, also known as O.T. Johnson Block, is a former seven-story, current two-story building located at 356 S. Broadway and 224 W. 4th Street in the Broadway Theater District in the historic core of downtown Los Angeles.

== History ==
O.T. Johnson Building was designed by John B. Parkinson and built as an office building in 1902. Originally seven stories in height, it was one of the tallest buildings on Broadway when it was first built. In 1904, the Automobile Club of Southern California opened their first office in the building.

In 1952, this building and other downtown properties were bought for $11 million ($133 million in 2025).

In 1979, the Broadway Theater and Commercial District was added to the National Register of Historic Places, with O.T. Johnson Building listed as a contributing property in the district. The building was delisted in 2002 when the district was updated to include an expansion. The delisting notes that the building was entirely covered and that it was unclear what of the original building remained under the covering.

The building was renovated in 2005, was reduced to two stores at some point prior to 2007, and it and its neighbor caught fire in 2007. Both buildings were owned by Eli Sasson at the time of the fire, with their ground floors occupied by retail and vacant floors above. According to Sasson, the fire rendered the buildings unsafe and they would have to be demolished. The building was still boarded up as of 2018.

== Architecture and design ==
O.T. Johnson Building was designed in the Romanesque style and was made of brick inside a steel frame with a glazed brick facade, while the ground floor was made of iron and glass. The building contained clean and simple lines that were considered "extremely up to date" when the building was first built. It featured paired columns flanking its entrance, large arched second-story windows, and fluted columns throughout its facade.

By 2002, the building had been entirely covered in metal siding that resembled wood shingles. The siding was removed after the building caught fire in 2007, revealing the building's long-hidden details.

== See also ==
- List of contributing properties in the Broadway Theater and Commercial District
