= Braun Building =

Building in Los Angeles, California

- U.S. Historic district – Contributing property
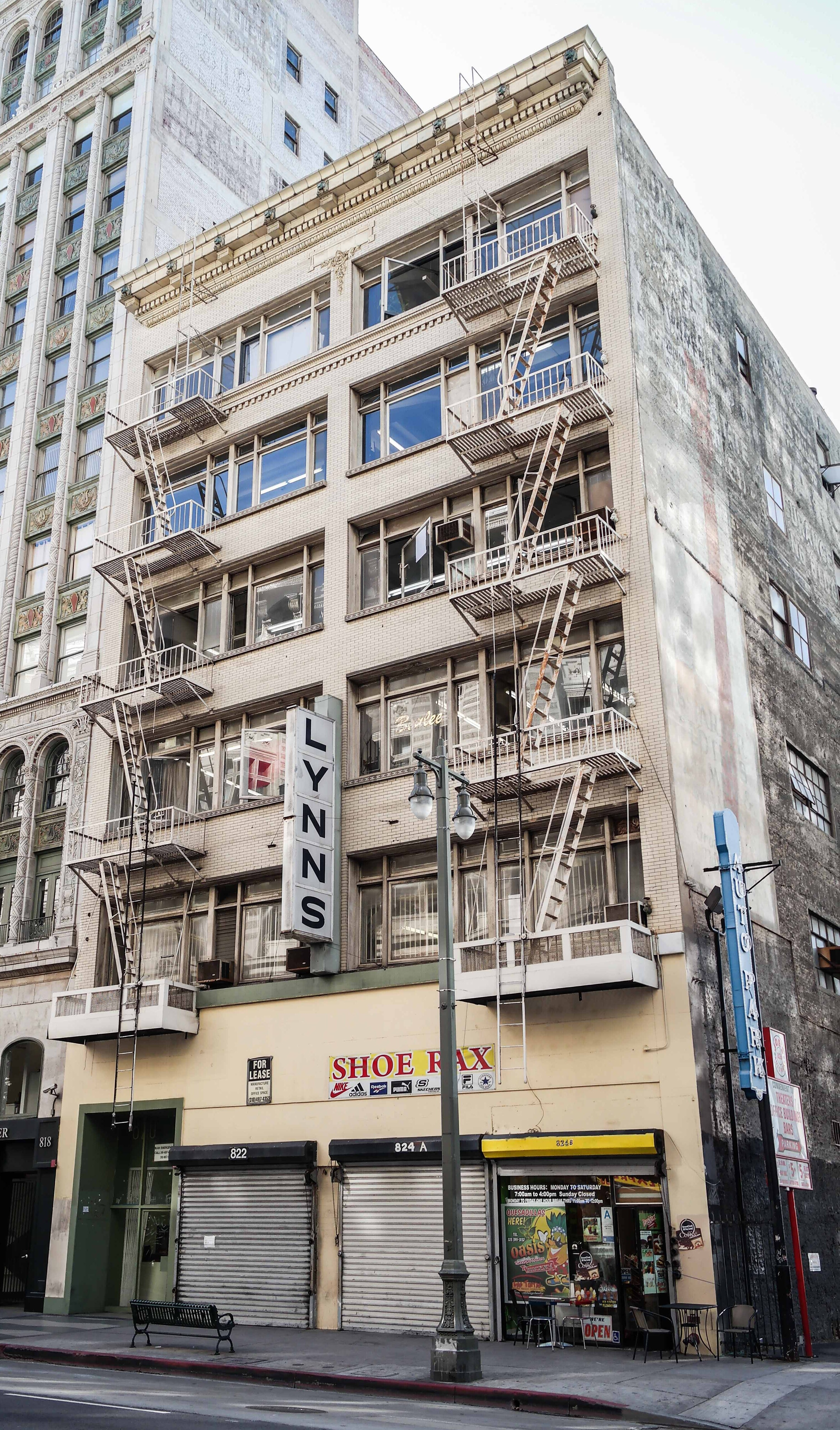
- The building in 2014

- Location within the Los Angeles metropolitan area
- Location: 820-822 S. Broadway, Los Angeles, California
- Coordinates: 34°02′36″N 118°15′18″W
- Built: 1913
- Architect: Walter Jesse Saunders
- Part of: Broadway Theater and Commercial District (ID79000484)
- Designated CP: May 9, 1979

Braun Building is a historic six-story building located at 820-822 S. Broadway in the Broadway Theater District in the historic core of downtown Los Angeles.

== History ==
Braun Building was designed by Walter Jesse Saunders and built in 1913. In 1979, when the Broadway Theater and Commercial District was added to the National Register of Historic Places, Braun Building was listed as a contributing property in the district.

In January 2023, a 68-year-old employee working in the building was crushed by a freight elevator and died.

== Architecture and design ==
Braun Building is made of reinforced concrete with a glazed brick and terra cotta facade. The building's design is considered "clean and simple."

== See also ==
- List of contributing properties in the Broadway Theater and Commercial District
