= Robert Brown Young =

American architect

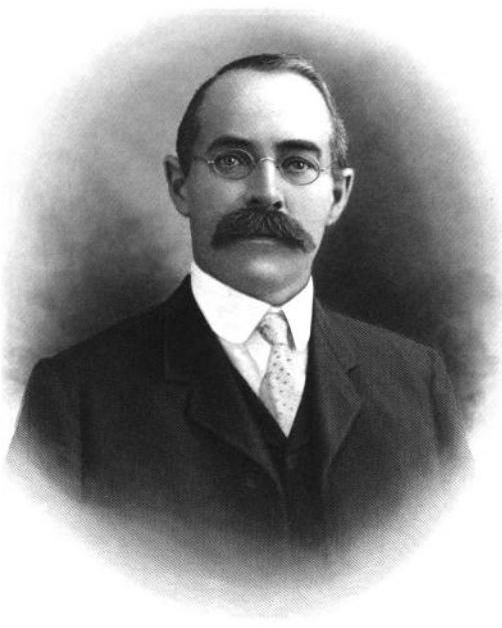
- Born: April 1, 1854; Huntingdon County, Quebec, Canada
- Died: January 29, 1916 (aged 61); Los Angeles, California, United States
- Occupation: Architect
- Spouse: Mary C. Wilson
- Children: 2
- Parent(s): Mary Ann (Dowler) Young; Alexander Young

Robert Brown Young (April 1, 1854 – January 29, 1914) was a Canadian-born architect who designed numerous buildings in California, particularly in downtown Los Angeles.

== Life ==
Robert Brown Young was born in Huntingdon County, Quebec, on April 1, 1854, to Alexander and Mary Ann (Dowler) Young. As a youth, Young attended Huntingdon Academy. In 1877, he moved to Denver, Colorado, where he finished his education in construction and architectural drawing. He then left for California, locating in San Francisco for two months before arriving in Los Angeles in the fall of 1878, where he opened an architect and general contractor practice.

Los Angeles at that time was a thriving city of about 10,000, with only two other architects as residents. Within a short time, demands for plans and architectural drawings exceeded what Young could handle, and so he gave up contracting entirely to focus on architecture. At one point during this building "boom", Young had 87 different buildings under construction.

Young was the resident architect of the Orpheum Theatre in Los Angeles, and he built many Catholic churches and schools in the diocese of Los Angeles and Monterey. He also served as president of the Southern California Chapter of the American Institute of Architects.

In 1880, Young married Mary C. Wilson. They had two children: Frank Wilson Young and Mary Elizabeth Young Moore. Frank joined his father in the family business, and continued the business under the name of R. B. Young & Son after his father's death. Young died at his home in Los Angeles on January 29, 1914.

== Works ==
=== Los Angeles ===
==== Extant ====
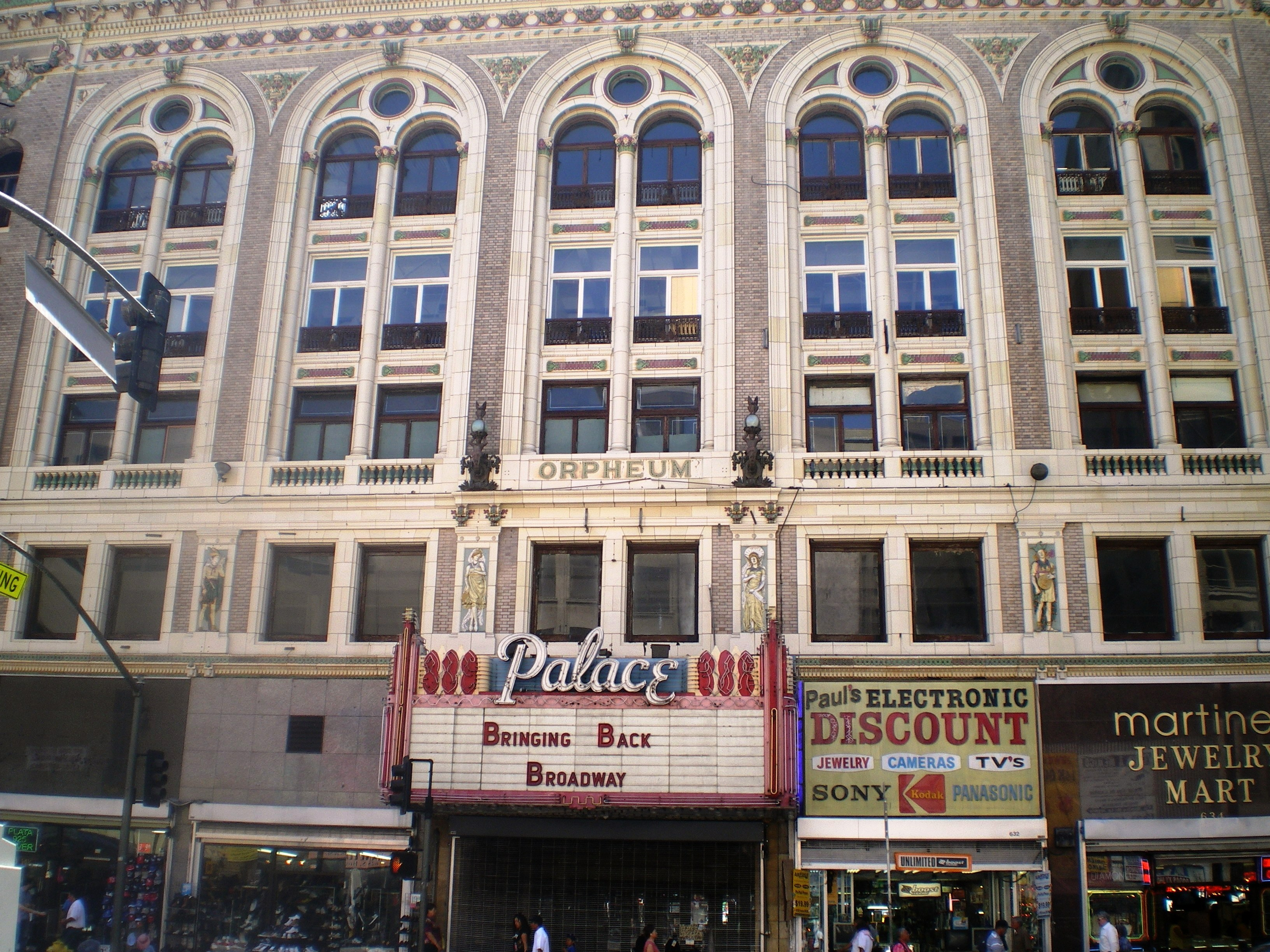
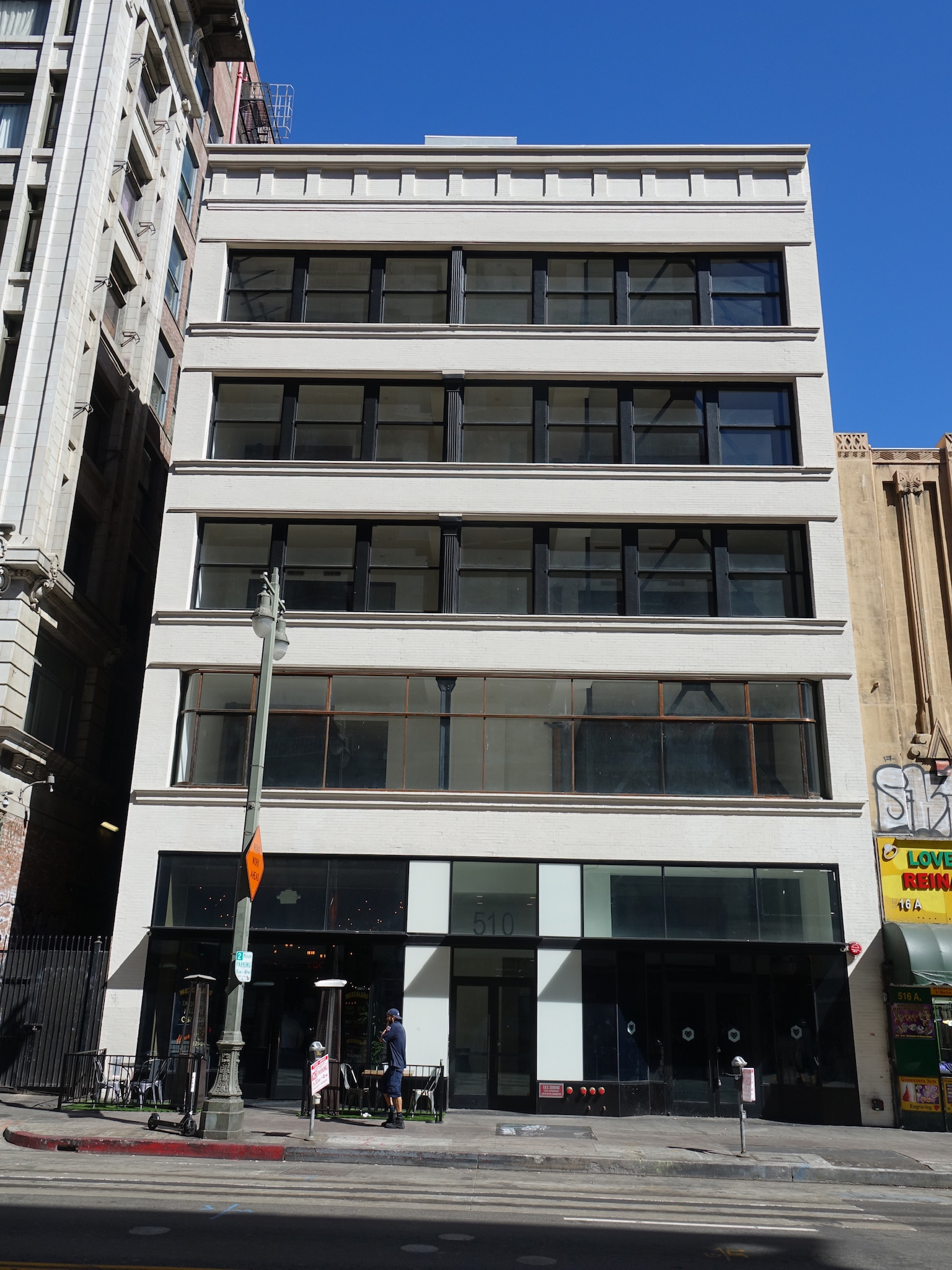
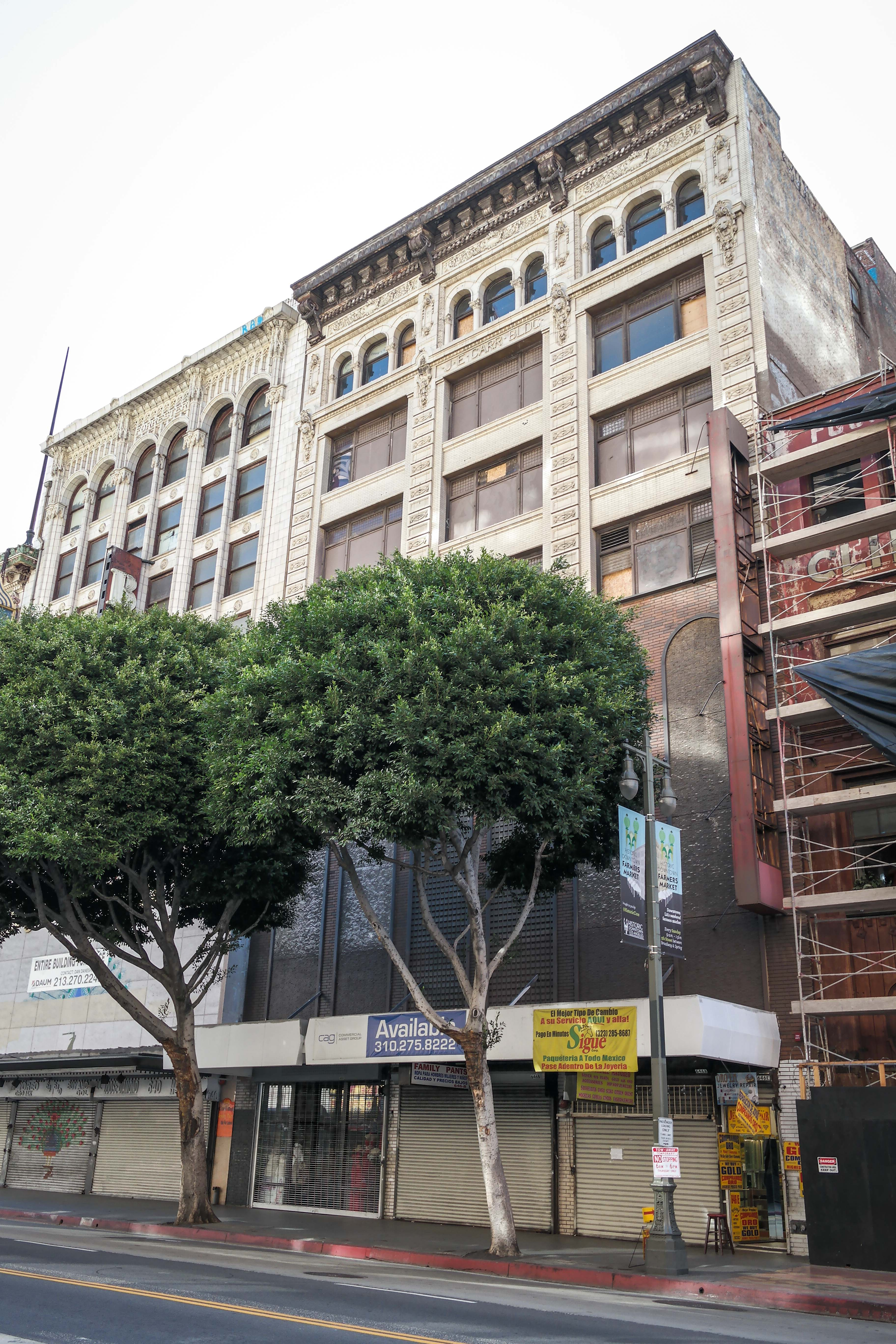
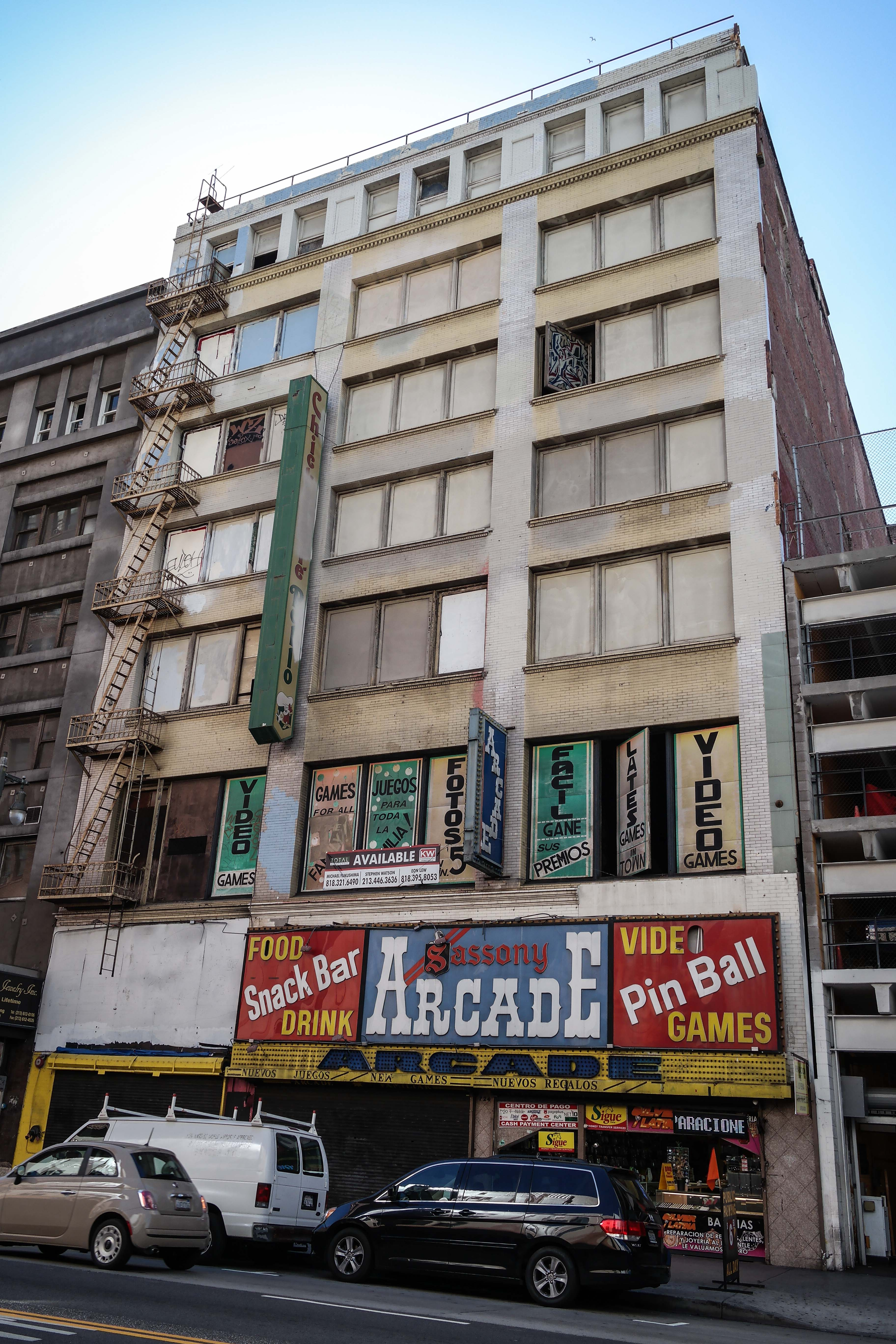
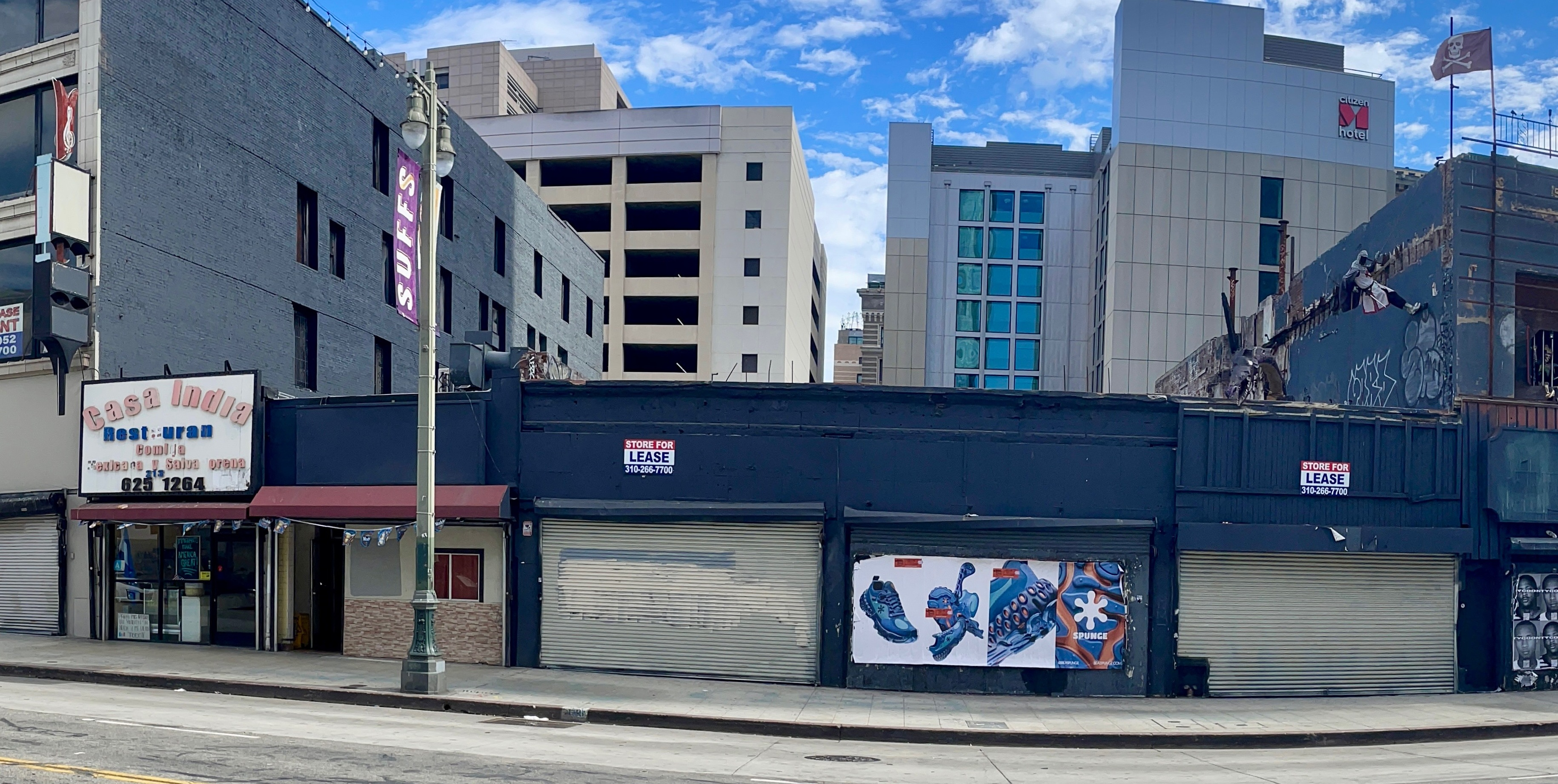
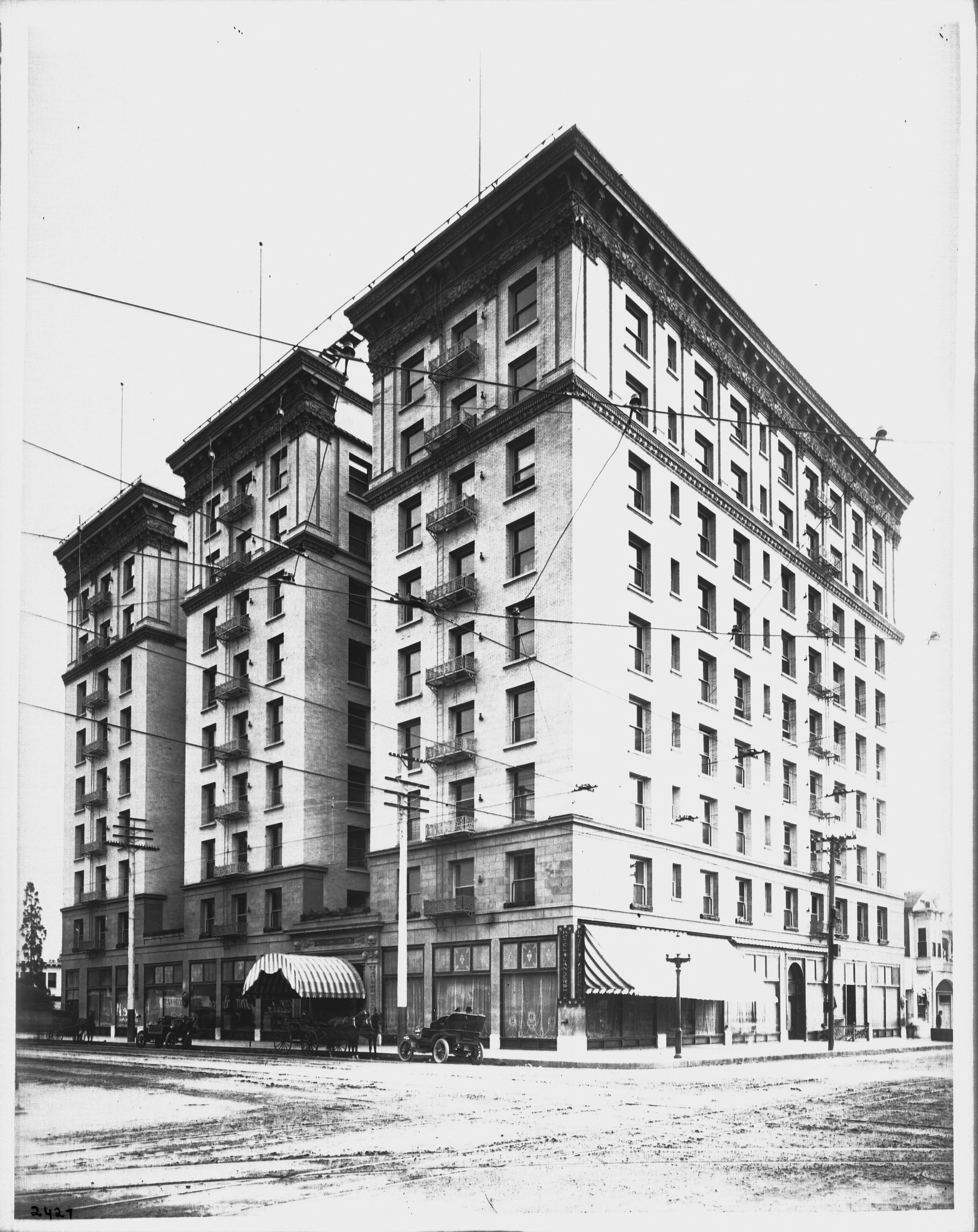
Contributing properties in the Broadway Theater and Commercial District (left-to-right, top-to-bottom): Palace Theater, O. T. Johnson Building No. 2, J. E. Carr Building, Barker Brothers Building, O. T. Johnson Block (de-listed in 2002), Lankershim Hotel (de-listed in 2002)
- Broadway Theater and Commercial District
  - O. T. Johnson Block (1895), de-listed in 2002
  - O. T. Johnson Building No. 2 (1905), LAHCM No. 1125
  - J. E. Carr Building (1909)
  - Barker Brothers Building (1909)
  - Palace Theater (1910), LAHCM No. 449
- Lankershim Building on 7th Street (1891)
- Gebhard Building (1900)
- Empire Theatre (1905)
- Young Apartments (1911)
- Boos Brothers' Cafeteria (1916)

==== Demolished ====
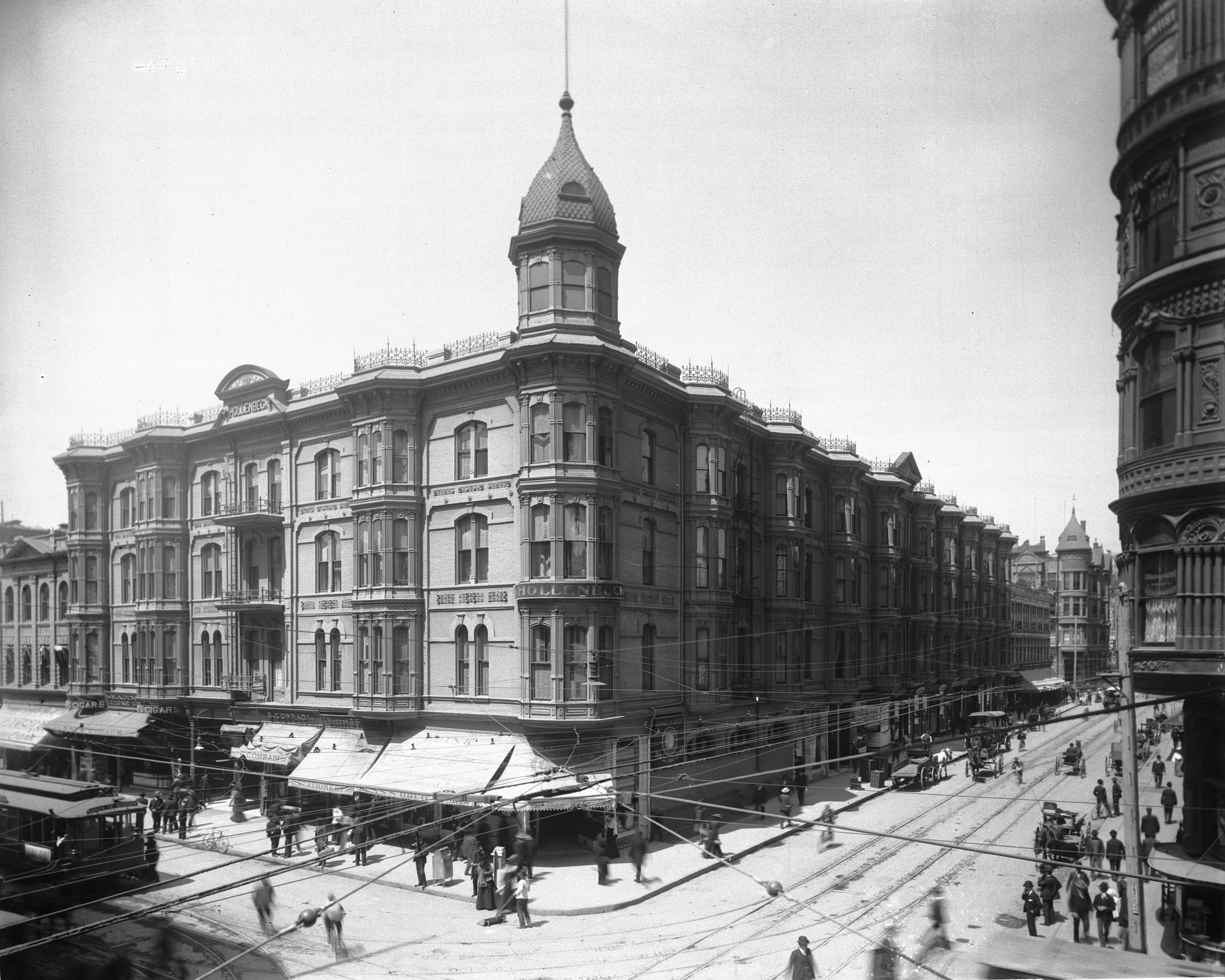
Hollenbeck Hotel

- Hollenbeck Hotel (1884)
- Lankershim Hotel No. 1 (1886)
- Hotel Westminster (1888)
- Burbank Theatre (1893)
- Lankershim Building on 3rd Street (1897)
- St. Mary's Church (1897-1923)
- Lankershim Hotel No. 2 (1905-1980s), Broadway Theater and Commercial District, de-listed in 2002
- Hotel Rosslyn No. 1
- Occidental Hotel
- Lankershim Building on Spring Street

=== Elsewhere in California ===
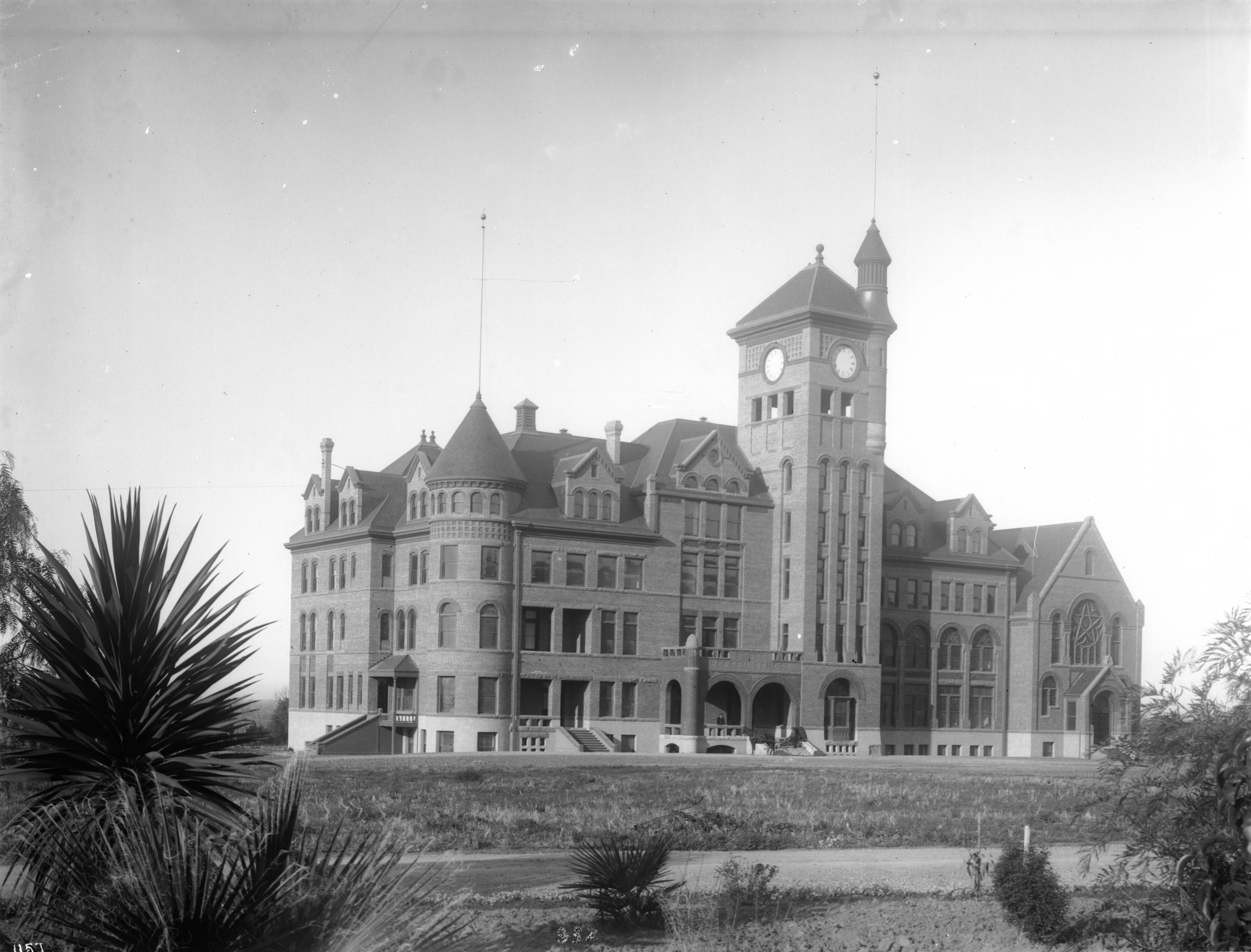
California State Reform School

- California State Reform School, Whittier, CHL No. 947
- Masonic Temple, Corona
- Reynolds' department store, Riverside
- St. Andrew's Catholic Church, Pasadena

=== Elsewhere ===
- Yuma County Court House, Yuma, Arizona

== See also ==
- List of American architects
- List of people from Los Angeles

== Bibliography ==
- Cahill, B. J. S. (1914). Architect and Engineer. Vol. XXXV (Public domain ed.).
- Guinn, James Miller (1915). A History of California and an Extended History of Los Angeles and Environs: Also Containing Biographies of Well-known Citizens of the Past and Present (Public domain ed.). Historic Record Company. p. 183.
