= Hotel Lankershim =

Former hotel in Los Angeles, California, US

- Former U.S. Historic district – Contributing property
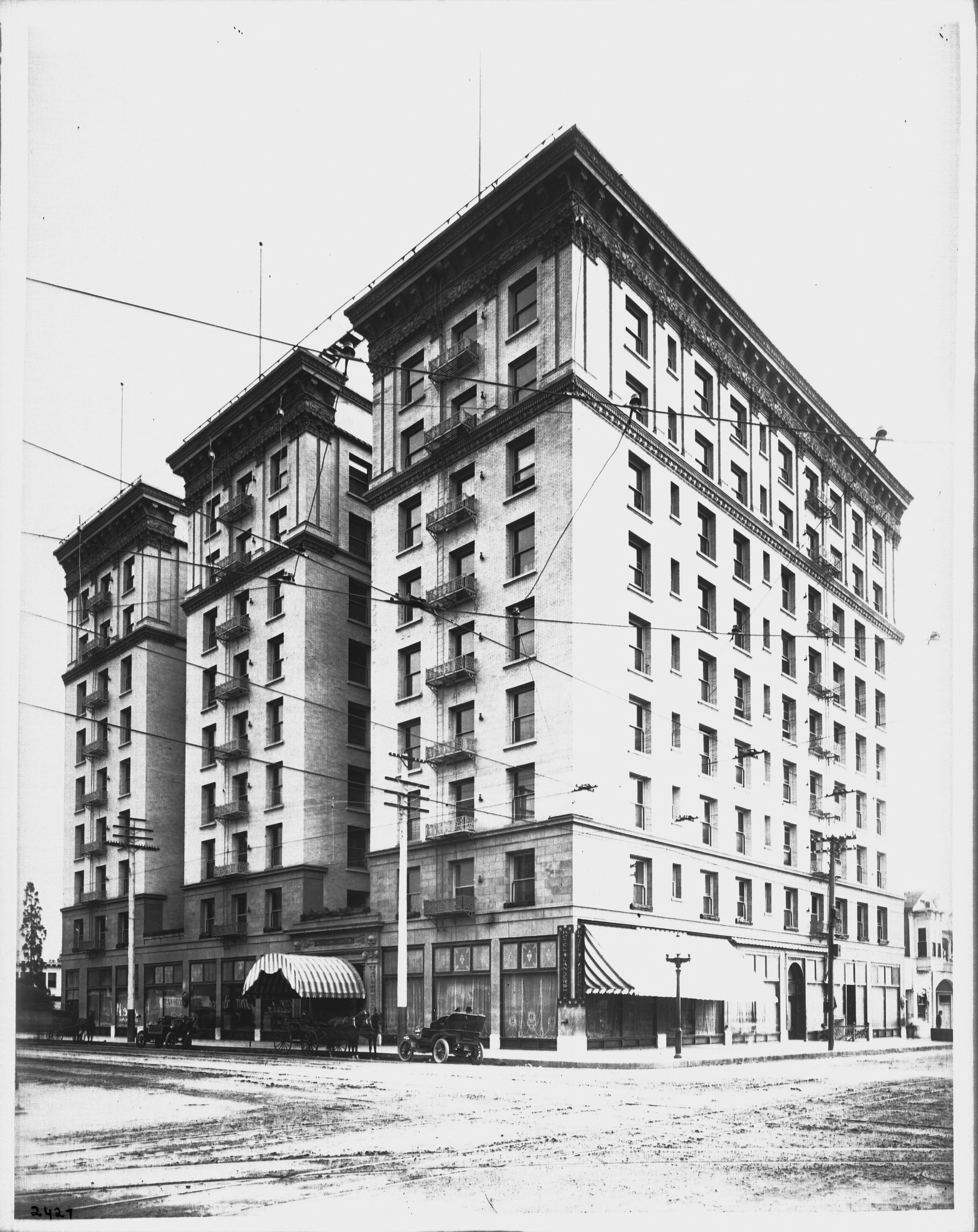
- The building c. 1907

- Location within the Los Angeles metropolitan area
- Location: 700 S. Broadway and 230 W. 7th Street, Los Angeles, California
- Coordinates: 34°02′43″N 118°15′12″W
- Built: 1902-1905
- Architect: Robert Brown Young
- Demolished: 1980s
- Part of: Broadway Theater and Commercial District (ID79000484)

Significant dates
- Designated CP: May 9, 1979
- Delisted CP: April 12, 2002

Hotel Lankershim was a landmark hotel located at 7th Street and Broadway in the Broadway Theater District in downtown Los Angeles's historic core.

== History ==
Hotel Lankershim was designed by Robert Brown Young for James Boon Lankershim, whom the building was named after. Construction started in 1902 and was completed in 1905. Prior to construction, the land was the site of a vineyard owned by Judge Wilson Hugh Gray.

The hotel had 200 servants, 250 rooms, and 160 baths at its opening, and was considered far superior to the other hotels in Los Angeles at the time. Lankershim lived and worked in the building during its early years, and the hotel also ran a shuttle to and from nearby train stations during this time. Circa 1915, the hotel marketed itself as within a "stone's throw" of Bullock's and Hamburger's Department Store, as well as the Orpheum, Morosco, and Majestic theaters.

In 1919, Lankershim sold the lease to Wallace W. Whitecotton, operator of Berkeley's Shattuck Hotel. In 1926, Whitecotton sold the lease to E.P. Severcool and E.B. Edmonds.

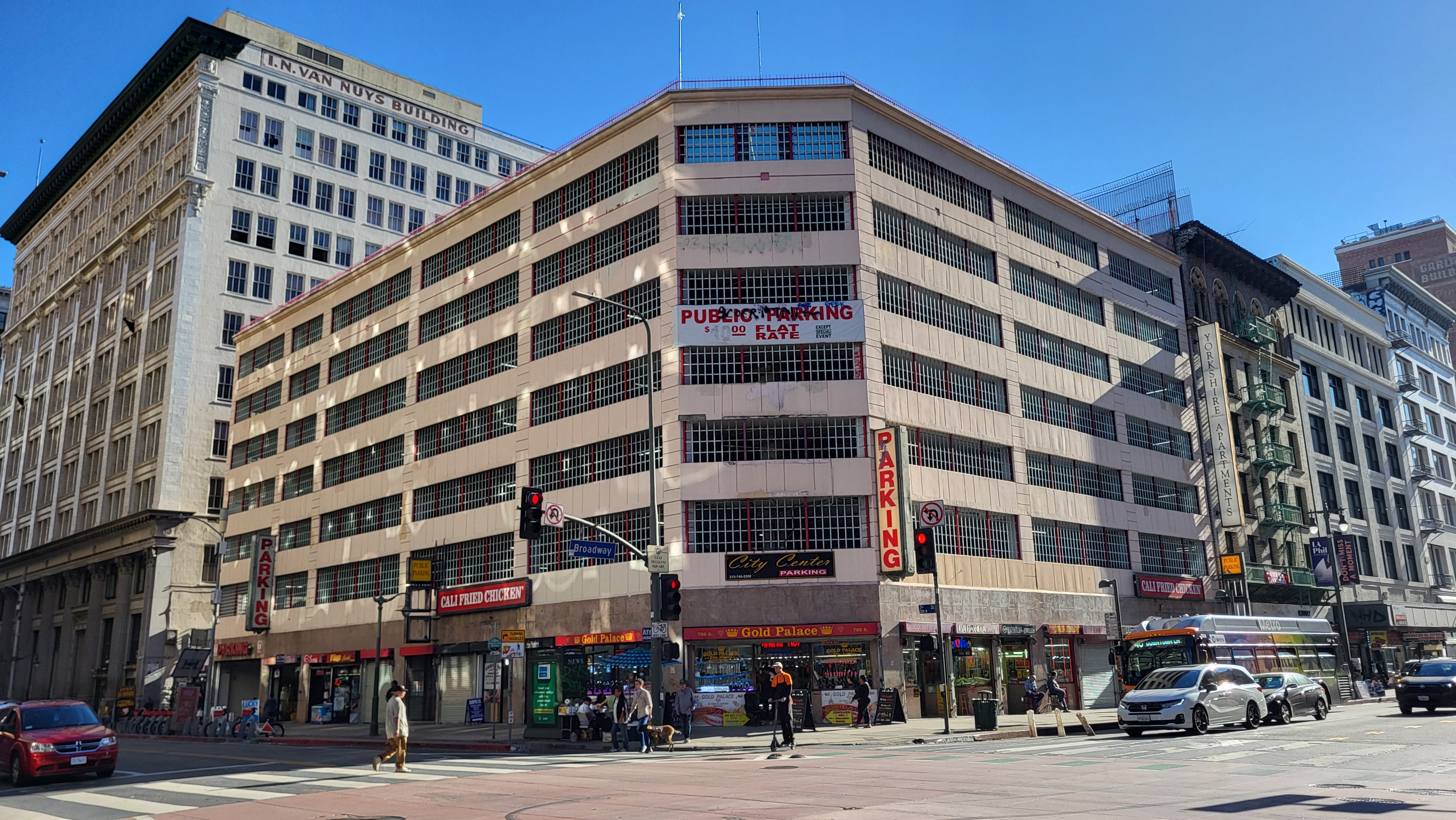
The building in 2025

In 1979, the Broadway Theater and Commercial District was added to the National Register of Historic Places, with Hotel Lankershim listed as a contributing property in the district. Despite this, the building was largely demolished in the early 1980s following structural damage caused by the 1971 Sylmar earthquake. Post demolition, a six-story parking structure was built on the building's remaining first floor, which was converted to retail, and the building was removed from the register in 2002.

== Architecture and design ==
Hotel Lankershim featured three eight-story towers atop a one story base. Each tower featured a stone and brick facade, and two light courts separated these towers, providing light, air, and a fire escape directly to each room. Overall, the building was an imitation of San Francisco's St. Francis Hotel.

Inside, the hotel featured a granite tile floor, polished stone columns with gilded capital, a polished wood recessed ceiling, and numerous chandeliers.

== See also ==
- List of contributing properties in the Broadway Theater and Commercial District
