= J. E. Carr Building =

Building in Los Angeles, California

- U.S. Historic district – Contributing property
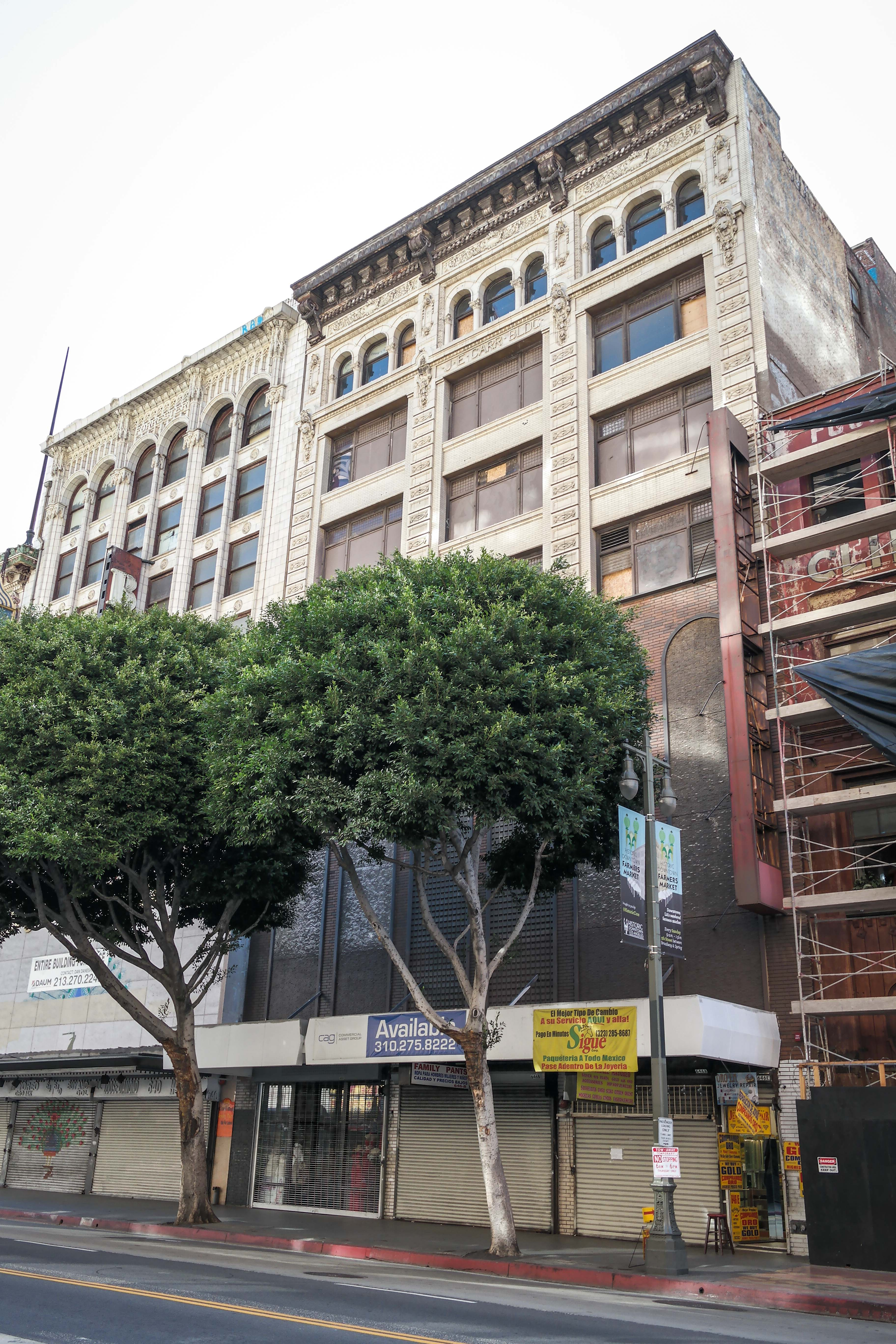
- The building in 2014

- Location within the Los Angeles metropolitan area
- Location: 644 S. Broadway, Los Angeles, California
- Coordinates: 34°02′44″N 118°15′10″W
- Built: 1908
- Architect: Robert Brown Young
- Architectural style: Renaissance Revival
- Part of: Broadway Theater and Commercial District (ID79000484)
- Designated CP: May 9, 1979

J. E. Carr Building, also known as the Joseph E. Carr Building and Brooks Building, is a historic eight story high-rise located at 644 S. Broadway in the Broadway Theater District in the historic core of downtown Los Angeles.

== History ==
J. E. Carr Building was designed by Robert Brown Young and built in 1908. The building opened in 1909, at which point it housed a furniture company. In the 1940s, the building housed Brooks Clothing, for which the building was later renamed Brooks Building. Other clothing stores were located in the building in the 1970s.

In 1979, the Broadway Theater and Commercial District was added to the National Register of Historic Places, with J. E. Carr Building listed as a contributing property in the district.

By 2017, the building was mostly empty, with the upper floors vacant since the 1980s. Plans to convert the building to residential with a ground floor bar were announced in the mid-2010s. Previous plans for the building included converting it into an automated parking system.

== Architecture and design ==
J. E. Carr Building was built with steel reinforced concrete and an enamelled terra cotta and brick facade. It features a Renaissance Revival design that includes heavy cornice, arched windows, and an unusually high amount of plate glass for its time period.

== See also ==
- List of contributing properties in the Broadway Theater and Commercial District
