= Forve-Pettebone Building =

Building in Los Angeles, California

- U.S. Historic district – Contributing property
- Los Angeles Historic-Cultural Monument
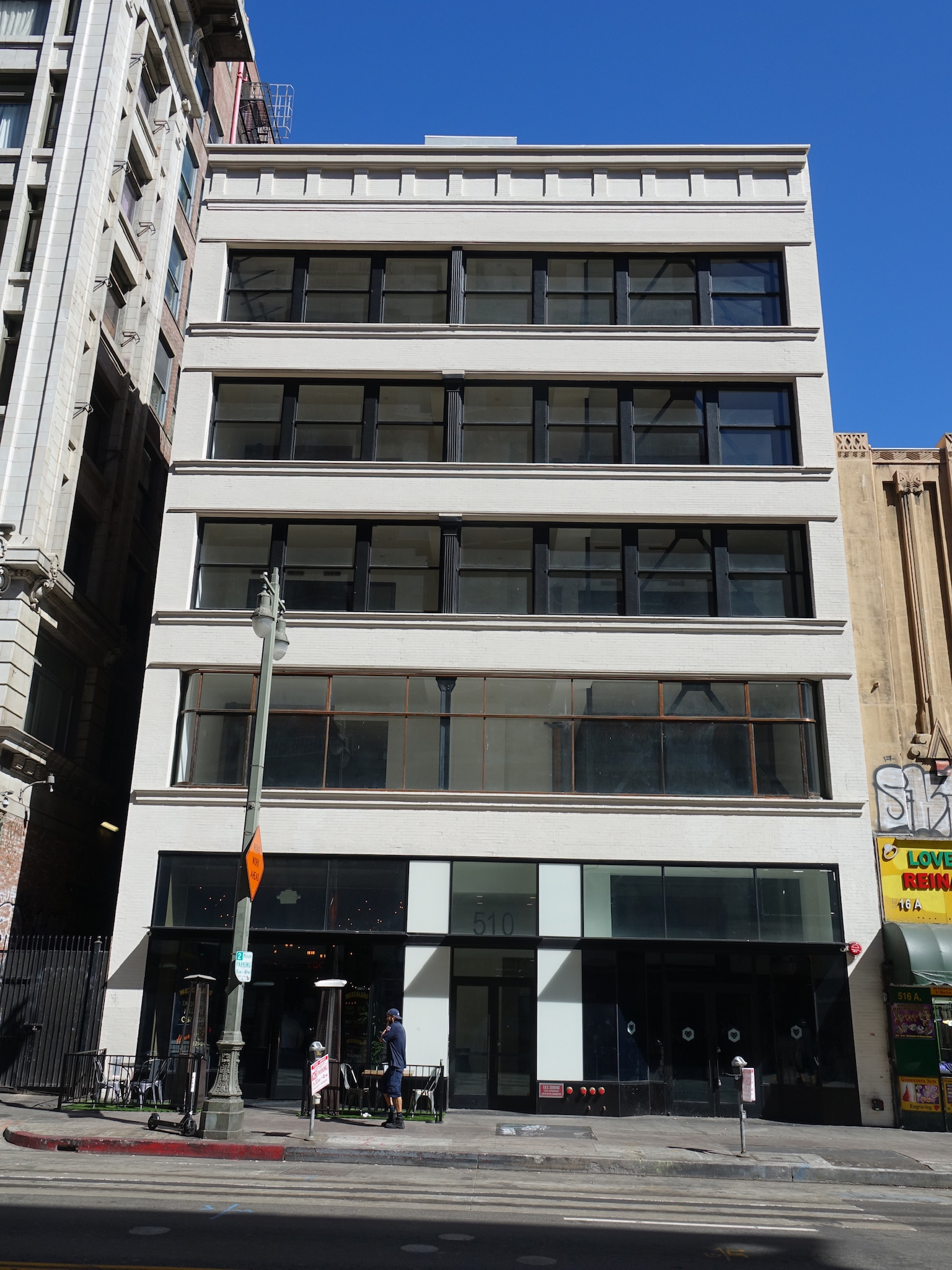
- The building in 2019

- Location within the Los Angeles metropolitan area
- Location: 510 S. Broadway, Los Angeles, California
- Coordinates: 34°02′51″N 118°15′03″W
- Built: 1905
- Architect: Robert Brown Young
- Part of: Broadway Theater and Commercial District (ID79000484)
- LAHCM No.: 1125

Significant dates
- Designated CP: May 9, 1979
- Designated LAHCM: June 14, 2016

Forve-Pettebone Building, also known as Pettebone Building and O.T. Johnson Building No. 2, is a historic five-story building located at 510 S. Broadway in the Broadway Theater District in the historic core of downtown Los Angeles.

== History ==
Forve-Pettebone Building was designed by Robert Brown Young and built for developer O.T. Johnson in 1905. Forve-Pettebone Company was one of the building's original tenants, and they designed and manufactured Broadway and downtown Los Angeles's first street lamps in the building. The building took its name from them and they moved out in 1924.

The building was purchased in 2015, after which the facade was restored and the building's interior was upgraded to modern standards. The building was sold again in 2019, to South Korean gaming company NHN Global Inc, for $22 million ($27.7 million in 2025). NHN Global Inc then relocated their headquarters from Koreatown to this building.

=== Historic designation ===
In 1979, the Broadway Theater and Commercial District was added to the National Register of Historic Places, with O.T. Johnson Building No. 2 listed as a contributing property in the district. In 2016, the building was listed as Los Angeles Historic Cultural Monument No. 1125.

== Architecture and design ==
Forve-Pettebone Building is made of brick and steel with a pressed-brick facade. The building originally featured cornice, but it has since been removed. The building's upper windows form almost solid bands.

The building's interior features wooden beams, exposed brick walls, and a cast-iron staircase.

== See also ==
- List of contributing properties in the Broadway Theater and Commercial District
- List of Los Angeles Historic-Cultural Monuments in Downtown Los Angeles
