= Wood Brothers Building =

Building in Los Angeles, California

- U.S. Historic district – Contributing property
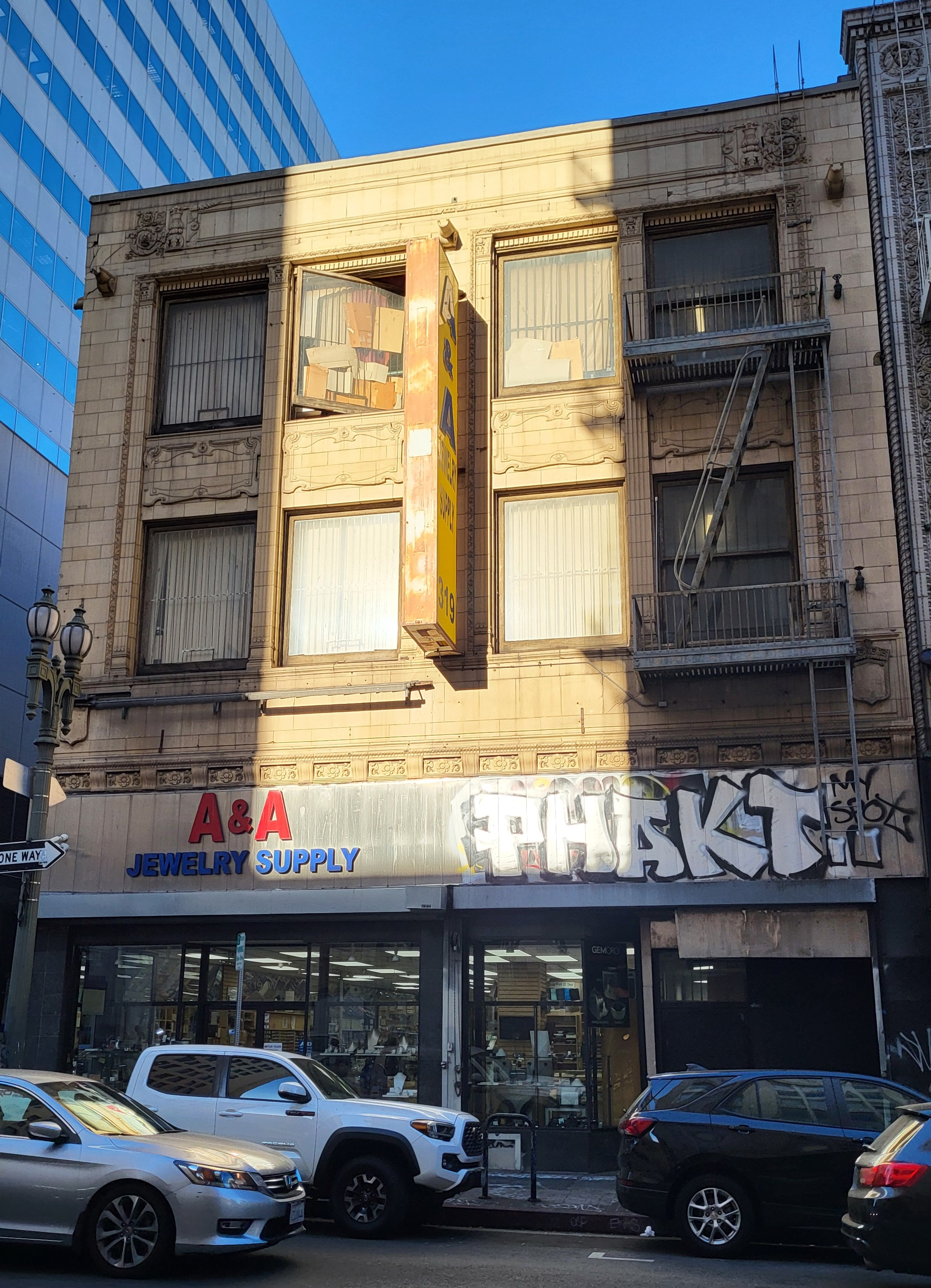
- The building in 2025

- Location within the Los Angeles metropolitan area
- Location: 315 W. 6th Street, Los Angeles, California
- Coordinates: 34°02′50″N 118°15′09″W
- Built: 1922
- Part of: Broadway Theater and Commercial District (ID79000484)
- Designated CP: May 9, 1979

Wood Brothers Building is a historic three-story building located at 315 W. 6th Street in the Broadway Theater District in the historic core of downtown Los Angeles.

== History ==
Wood Brothers Building was built in 1922 on the site of the Lindley Building, which housed California's first hospital and was built in 1887.

In 1979, the Broadway Theater and Commercial District was added to the National Register of Historic Places, with Wood Brothers Building listed as a contributing property in the district.

== Architecture and design ==
Wood Brothers Building is made of concrete and brick with terra cotta decoration.

== See also ==
- List of contributing properties in the Broadway Theater and Commercial District
