= O. T. Johnson Block =

Building in Los Angeles, California

- O.T. Johnson Block
- Former U.S. Historic district – Contributing property
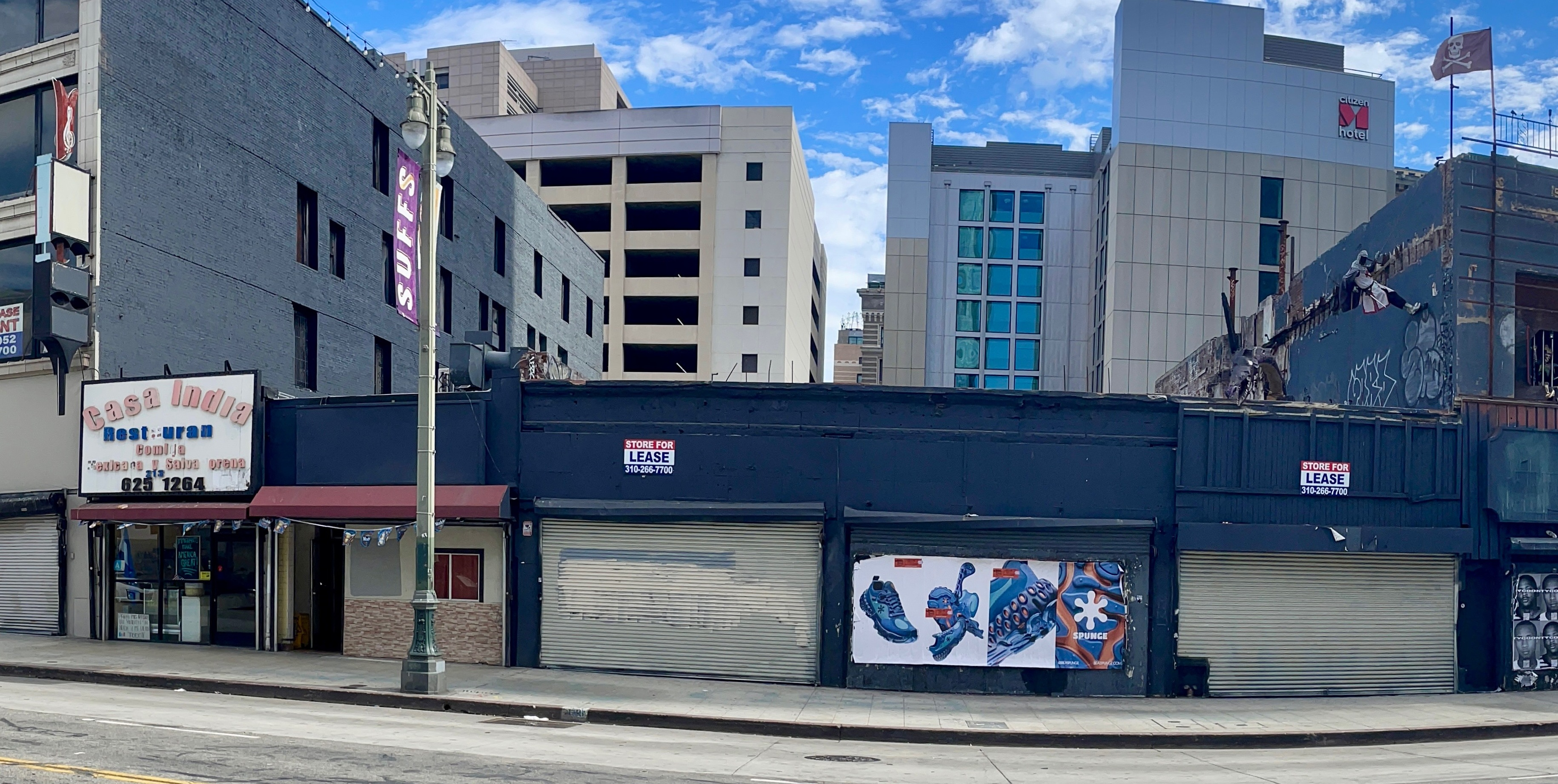
- The building in 2025

- Location within the Los Angeles metropolitan area
- Location: 350 S. Broadway, Los Angeles, California
- Coordinates: 34°02′59″N 118°14′56″W
- Built: 1895
- Architect: Robert Brown Young
- Architectural style: Italianate
- Part of: Broadway Theater and Commercial District (ID79000484)

Significant dates
- Designated CP: May 9, 1979
- Delisted CP: April 12, 2002

O.T. Johnson Block, also known as O.T. Johnson Block No. 4, is a former three-story building located at 350 S. Broadway in the Broadway Theater District in the historic core of downtown Los Angeles.

== History ==
O. T. Johnson block was designed as an office building by Robert Brown Young for O. T. Johnson and built by Nathaniel Dryden between 1893 and 1895.

In 1979, the Broadway Theater and Commercial District was added to the National Register of Historic Places, with O.T. Johnson Block listed as a contributing property in the district. The building was delisted in 2002 when the district was updated to include an expansion. The delisting notes that the building was entirely covered and that it was unclear what of the original building remained under the covering.

O.T. Johnson Block and its neighbor caught fire in 2007. At the time, both buildings were owned by Eli Sasson with their ground floors occupied by retail and vacant floors above. According to Sasson, the fire rendered the buildings unsafe and they would have to be demolished. The building was still boarded up as of 2018.

== Architecture and design ==
O.T. Johnson Block is built of brick and iron with a stone facing and features an Italianate design that includes paired fluted columns and arched windows. The building originally featured a parapet with ballastrade, but it was removed sometime before 1979.

By 2002, the building had been entirely covered in metal siding that resembled wood shingles. The siding was removed after the building caught fire in 2007, revealing the building's long-hidden details.

== See also ==
- List of contributing properties in the Broadway Theater and Commercial District
