= Broadway (Los Angeles) =

Road in Los Angeles County, California, US

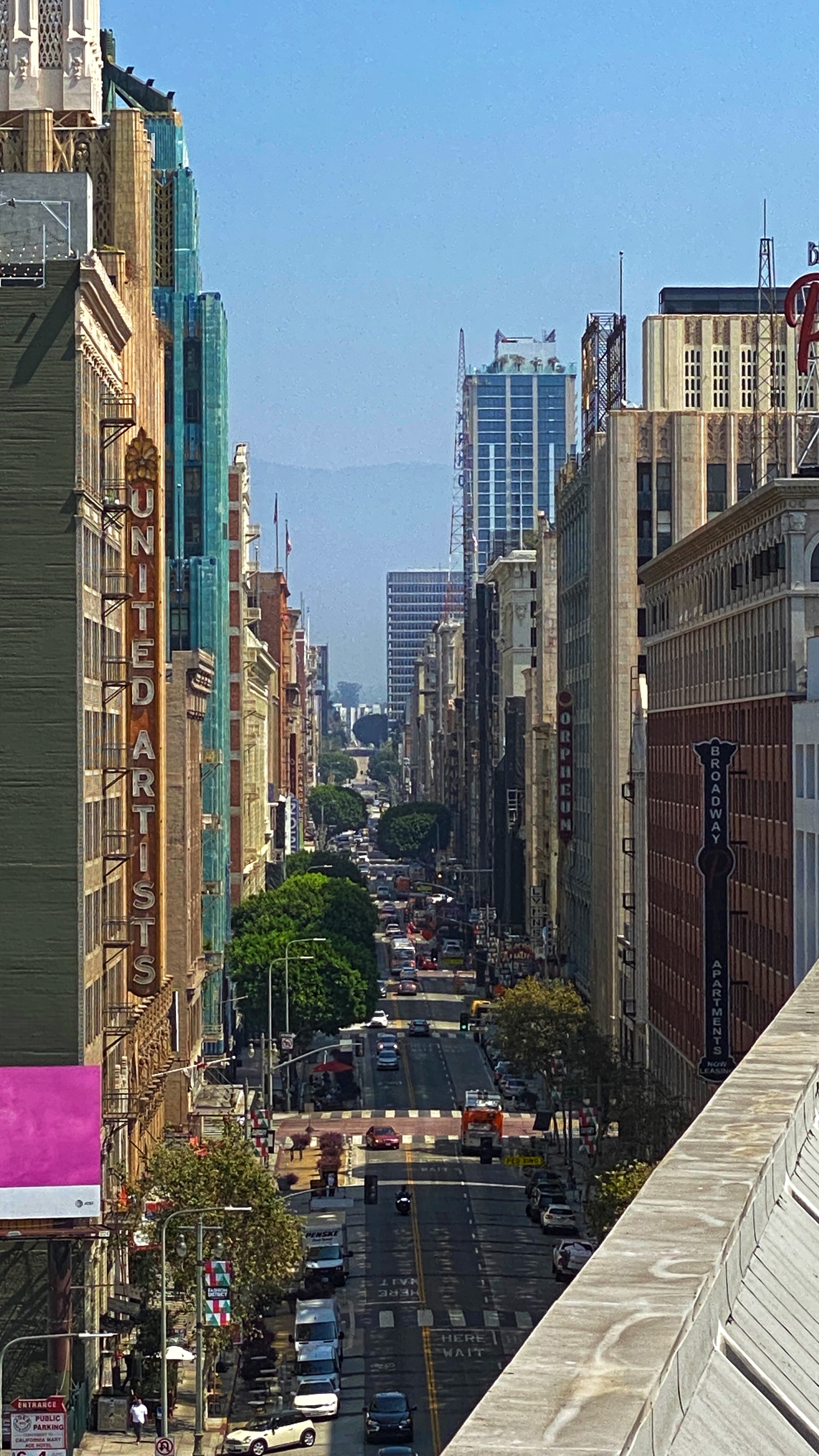
- Broadway looking north from 11th Street, 2020
- Interactive map of Broadway
- Former name: Ford Street
- Maintained by: Local jurisdictions
- Length: 17.75 mi (28.57 km)
- Location: Los Angeles County, California, United States
- Nearest metro station: Historic Broadway station
- South end: Main Street in Carson
- Major junctions: SR 91 in Carson; I-10 in Downtown; US 101 in Downtown; I-5 in Lincoln Heights
- Northeast end: Mission Road in Lincoln Heights

Construction
- Inauguration: 1890
- Broadway Theater and Commercial District (NRHP); Broadway Theater and Entertainment District (City of Los Angeles)
- U.S. National Register of Historic Places
- U.S. Historic district
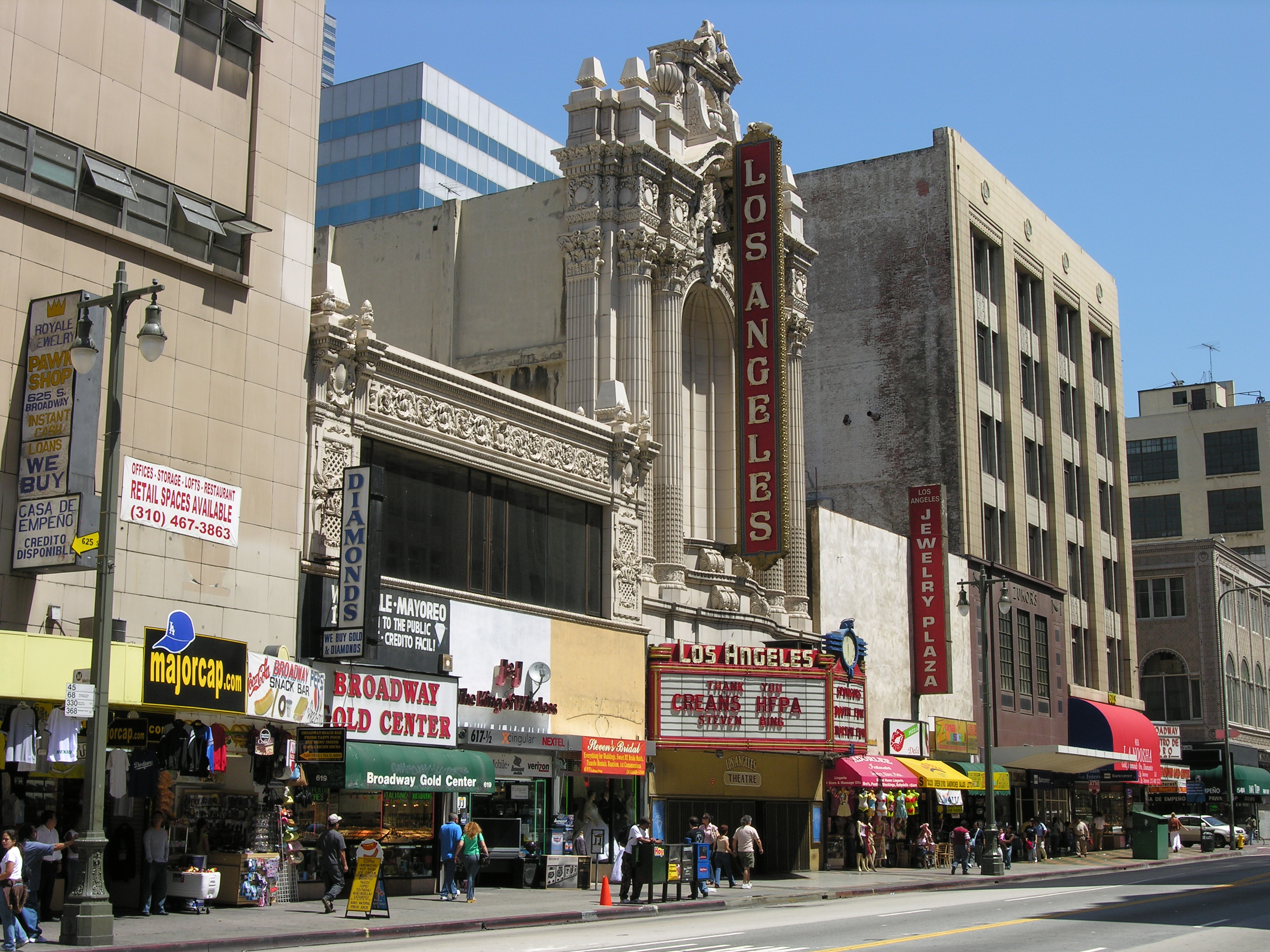
- Los Angeles Theatre on Broadway

- Location within Los Angeles
- Location: 300—849 S. Broadway; Los Angeles, California
- Coordinates: 34°2′48″N 118°15′4″W
- Architect: Multiple
- Architectural style: Early Commercial, Classical Revival, Art Deco
- NRHP reference No.: 79000484

Significant dates
- Added to NRHP: May 9, 1979
- Boundary increase: April 12, 2002

Broadway is a major thoroughfare in Los Angeles County, California. The portion of Broadway from 3rd to 9th streets was Los Angeles's main commercial area from the 1910s until World War II and in 1979, it was listed as the Broadway Theater and Commercial District in the National Register of Historic Places, the first and largest theater district to be listed. The district was expanded to 2nd and Olympic in 2002.

== Route ==
South Broadway's southern terminus is Main Street just north of Intserstate 405 in Carson. From there, the street travels 10 miles (16 km) north through Athens and South Los Angeles, across Interstate 105 and Interstate 10, to downtown Los Angeles. In downtown, it forms the border between South Park and the Fashion District, then travels through the historic core and the Broadway Theater and Commercial District, then continues through the Civic Center and across US-101. North of US-101, Broadway becomes North Broadway as it enters Chinatown. North of Chinatown, North Broadway curves northeast, passing through railyards and crossing Interstate 5, after which it heads east to its terminus at Mission Road in Lincoln Heights.

== History ==
=== Founding and extension ===
Broadway, originally Fort Street (named after Fort Moore), was first laid out by Edward Ord as part of his 1849 plan for Los Angeles. The street began at the south side of Fort Moore Hill, one block north of Temple Street. It is one of the oldest streets in the city.

In 1890, Fort Street was renamed Broadway from 1st to 10th Street, while the rest was renamed North Broadway. One year later, proposals were made to connect Broadway to Buena Vista Street (now North Broadway) and extend the street south into what was part of Main Street. Broadway Tunnel opened in 1901, traveling through Fort Moore Hill and extending North Broadway to Buena Vista Street at Bellevue Avenue.

A bridge across the Los Angeles River opened in 1911, connecting Buena Vista Street to Downey Avenue, both of which were renamed North Broadway despite significant objections from residents and landowners. The bridge was referred to as Buena Vista Street Bridge even after the streets were renamed.

A section of Broadway in South Los Angeles was named Moneta Avenue until 1923.

=== Commercial and entertainment center ===
Prior to the 20th century, Los Angeles's Central Business District was located along Spring and Main Street between Los Angeles Plaza and 2nd Street. In 1895, J.W. Robinson's opened a four-story department store at 239 S. Broadway, starting the shopping district's shift to Broadway. Numerous historic buildings, including commercial, residential, and office, as well as live theaters and movie palaces, were built along Broadway between 1893 and 1934.

From c. 1905 through the 1950s, Broadway was considered the center for shopping in all of greater Los Angeles. The district contained more than 3,400,000 sq ft (320,000 m^{2}) in department store space.

=== Decline and revitalization ===
Los Angeles's premier theater district shifted to Hollywood in the 1920s, while its commercial center left Broadway in the 1950s. Broadway declined significantly soon after.

The Broadway Theater and Commercial District, the first and largest historic theater district listed on the National Register of Historic Places, was designated in 1979 and expanded in 2002. The district contains twelve theaters and more than fifty additional buildings, several of which were in disuse or disrepair at the time of their designation, many of which have since been repurposed or restored.

Broadway's department stores closed in the 1970s and 1980s, at which point the area transitioned to a working class Latino shopping destination. Additionally, in the 2010s, a sneaker and streetwear retail cluster named Sneaker Row emerged on Broadway between 4th and 9th streets. Retail at 9th & Broadway has also proliferated, with the opening of Acne Studios, Oak NYC, Aesop, Tanner Goods, BNKR, Austere, A.P.C., and Urban Outfitters.

In 2008, the City of Los Angeles launched a $40-million ($59.8 million in 2025) campaign to revitalize Broadway, known as Bringing Back Broadway, this despite some merchants' concerns that the campaign would spread the gentrification occurring in other parts of downtown. The campaign's commission, led by City Councilman Jose Huizar, recommended widening sidewalks, eliminating traffic lanes, constructing new parking structures, and adding streetcar service reminiscent of the street's past.

In 2014, a pedestrian-friendly project widened Broadway's sidewalks and replaced its parking lane with planters, chairs, and cafe tables. Mayor Eric Garcetti said the effort, part of the larger Great Streets Initiative that focused on walkability and transit throughout Los Angeles, represented "a shift from the way that our neighborhoods have been planned."

== Buildings and sites ==
=== North of Hollywood Freeway ===
- Lincoln High School (1913, 1937 reconstruction by Albert C. Martin Sr.), 3501 N. Broadway
- Chinatown East Gate (1938, Webster & Wilson), 947 N. Broadway
- former site of Little Joe's (1927–1998), 904 N. Broadway
- Chinatown Gateway Monument (2001), 600 N. Broadway
- former site of Broadway Tunnel (1901–1949) below Fort Moore Hill

=== Hollywood Freeway to First ===
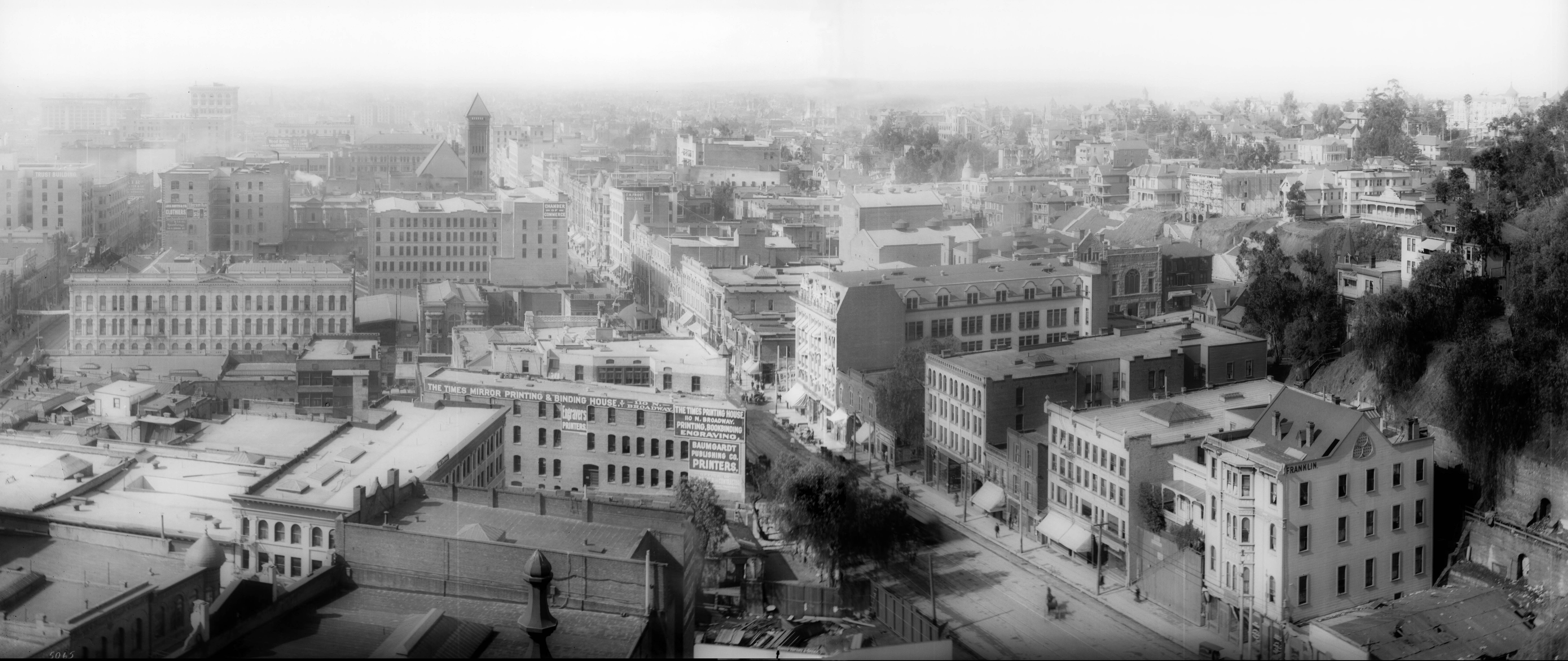
Broadway looking south from Temple Street (one block north of 1st), 1905

==== West side ====
- former site of Woman's Christian Temperance Union Temple (1888–1950s), 301 N. Broadway, Temple and Broadway
- Los Angeles County Hall of Records (1962, Richard Neutra and Robert Alexander), 320 W. Temple Street, Temple and Broadway
- Grand Park
- Los Angeles County Law Library, 1st and Broadway
- former site of Los Angeles Times Building (1887–1910) and (1912–1934), 1st and Broadway, housed the Los Angeles Times
- former site of Tajo Building (1896–1940), 1st and Broadway, housed the Los Angeles Stock Exchange (1900–1901), US District Court and US Marshals offices (1901–1910), USC Law School (1911–1925), and the Mexican Consulate (1922–1923)

==== East side ====
- Hall of Justice (1925, Allied Architects Association), 211 W. Temple Street, Temple and Broadway
- Clara Shortridge Foltz Criminal Justice Center (1972, Adrian Wilson Associates), 210 W. Temple Street, Temple and Broadway
- former site of Los Angeles High School (1873–1887), Temple and Broadway
- former site of Red Sandstone Courthouse (1891–1936), Temple and Broadway
- Grand Park
- former site of Los Angeles County Hall of Records (1911–1973, Hudson and Munsell), 220 N. Broadway

=== First to Second ===
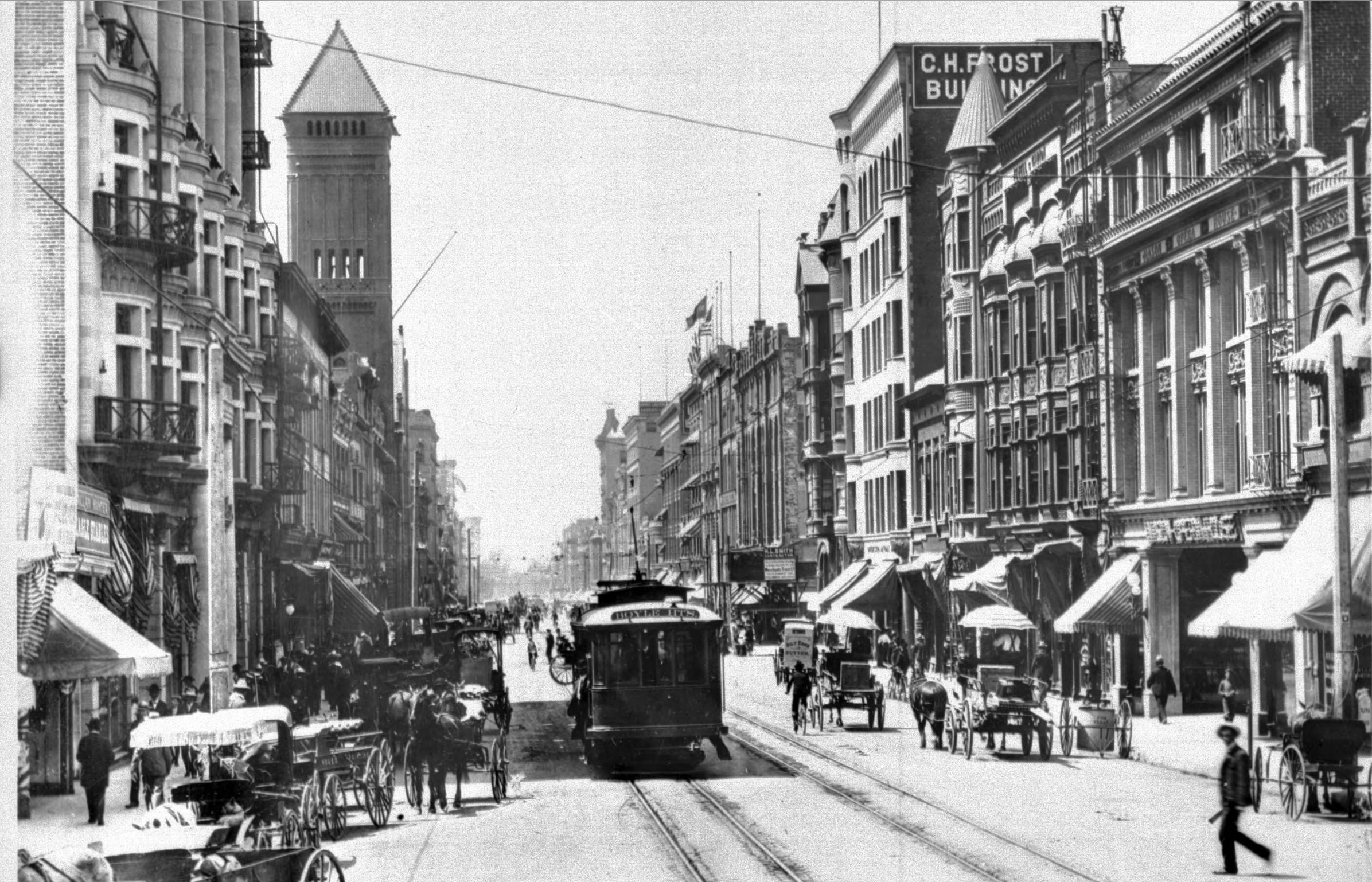
Broadway looking south from 1st Street, c. 1905

==== West side ====
- United States Courthouse (2016, Skidmore, Owings & Merrill LLP), 100-block S. Broadway
- former site of Mason Opera House (1903–1956, Benjamin Howard Marshall), 127 S. Broadway

==== East side ====
- Times Mirror Square Pereira Addition (1973, William Pereira), 1st and Broadway
- former site of Los Angeles Chamber of Commerce Building (1904–pre. 2016, William H. Allen), 128 S. Broadway

=== Second to Third ===
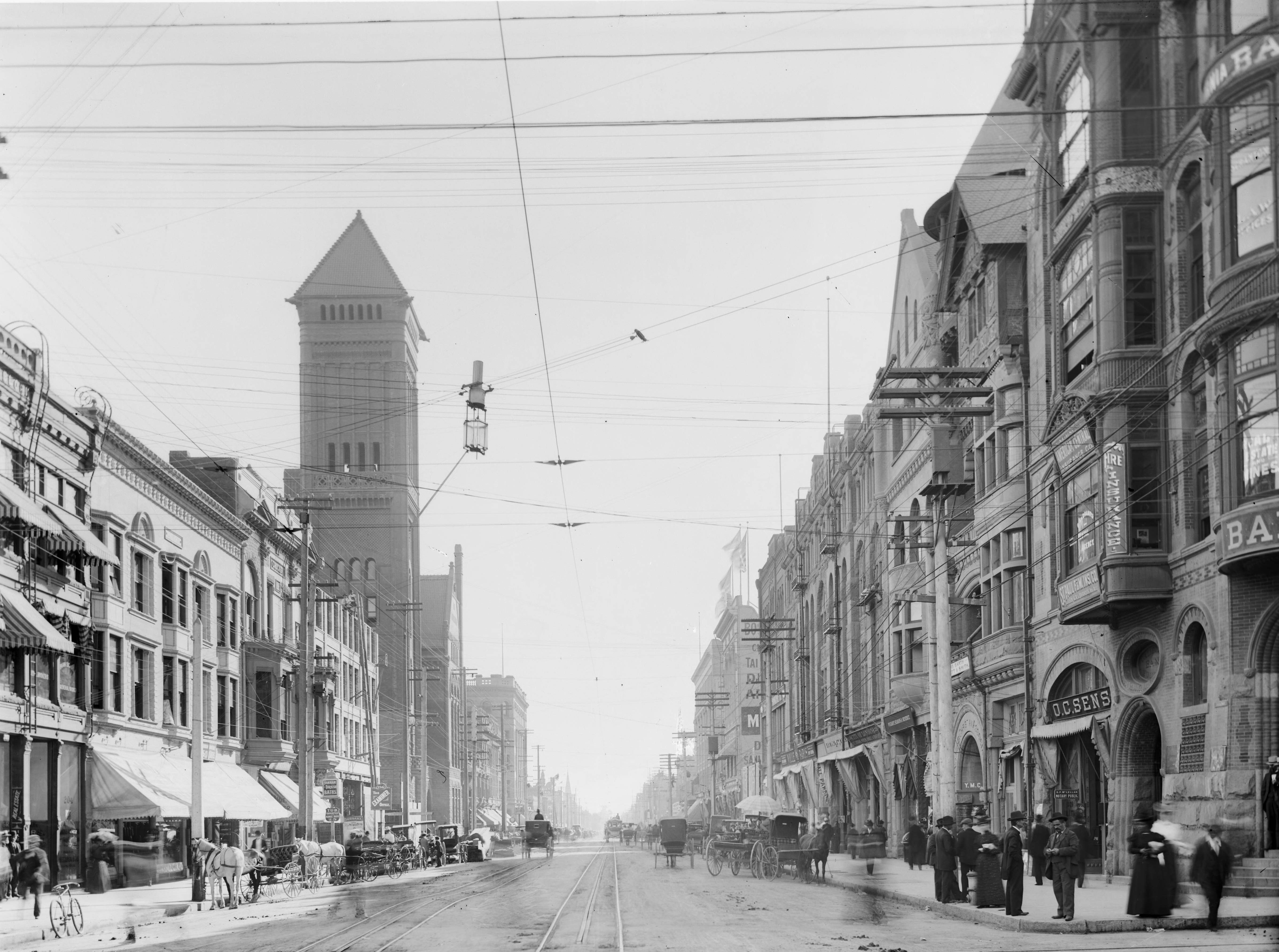
Broadway looking south from 2nd Street, c. 1895-1905

==== West side ====
- former site of Potomac Block (1890–1953, Block, Curlett and Eisen), 213–223 S. Broadway, housed Ville de Paris (pre-1904) and Coulter's (post-1904)
- former site of Boston Dry Goods Building (1895–unknown, Theodore Eisen and Sumner Hunt), 239 S. Broadway
- former site of I. Magnin Department Store (1899–unknown), 251 S. Broadway
- Irvine-Byrne Building (1894, Sumner Hunt), 249–259 S. Broadway

==== East side ====
- Historic Broadway metro station (2023), 202 S. Broadway
- former site of Los Angeles City Hall (1888–1928, Solomon Irmscher Haas), 228–238 S. Broadway,
- Victor Clothing Company Building (1914, Train & Williams), 242 S. Broadway, originally a City Hall annex, housed Victor Clothing (1964–2001)

=== Third to Fourth ===
==== West side ====
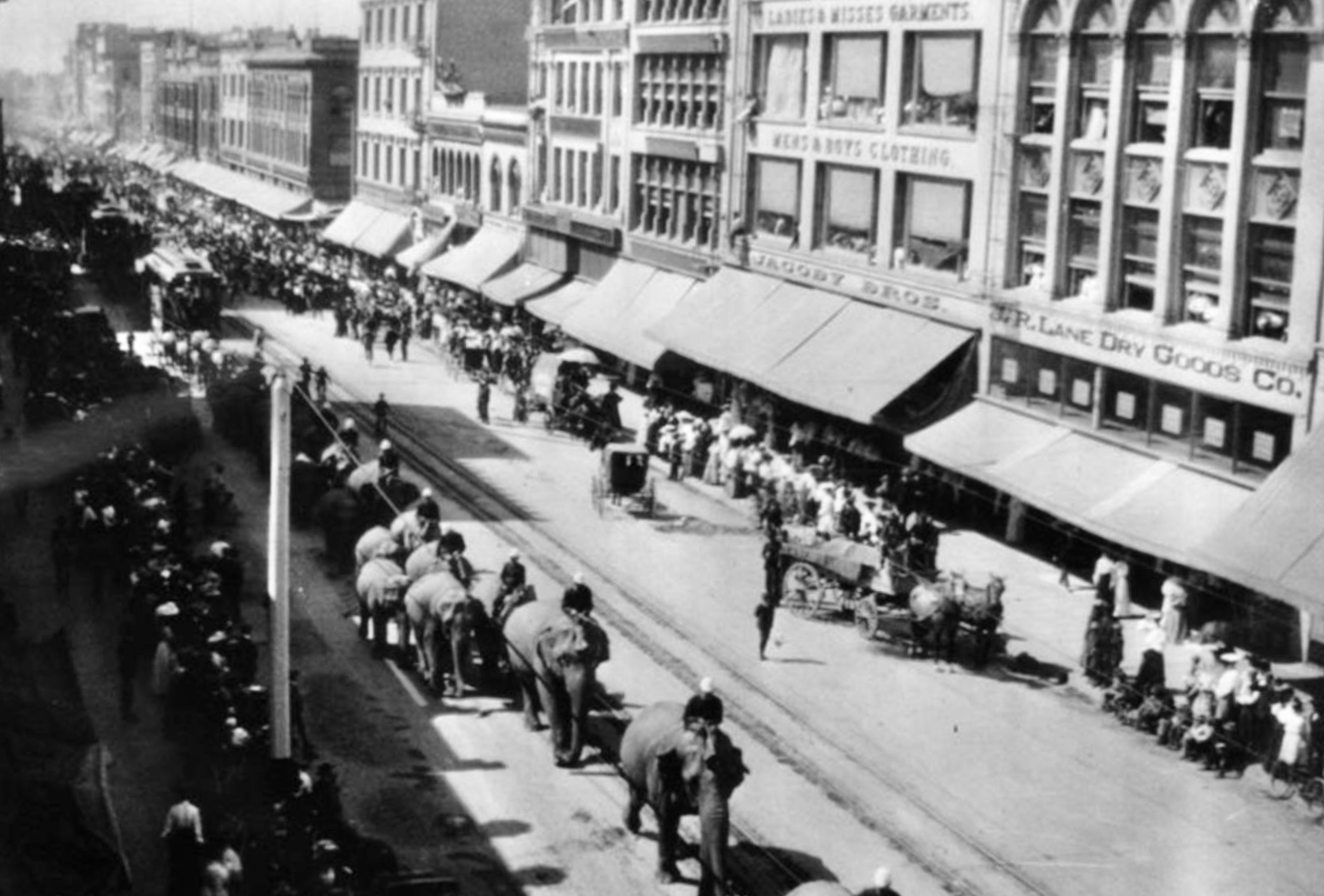
West side of Broadway's 300 block, 1905

- Million Dollar Theater (1917, Albert C. Martin Sr.), 307 S. Broadway, 2345-seat movie palace
- Homer Laughlin Building (1896, John Parkinson), 317 S. Broadway, housed Coulter's (1898–1905) and Ville de Paris (1905–1917), houses Grand Central Market (since 1917)
- Jacoby Building (c. 1900, John B. Parkinson), 331–335 S. Broadway, housed Jacoby Bros. (1900–1935) and Boston Store (late 1930s)
- former site of Haggarty's (1905–1917), 337–339 S. Broadway
- Karl's Building (1903, Abram M. Edelman), 341–345 S. Broadway, housed J. M. Hale (1909–unknown)
- Zobel Building (c. 1912), 351–353 S. Broadway, housed The Wonder (1921–unknown), the largest retail silk store in the United States
- Grant Building (1898, Frank Van Trees, 1901–2, enlarged by John Parkinson), 355–363 S. Broadway, housed W. E. Cummings shoe store, Montgomery Bros., and Weatherby-Kayser

==== East side ====
- Bradbury Building (1893, George Wyman), 304 S. Broadway
- former site of Central Theatre, 314 S. Broadway
- Blackstone Building (1907), 318–322 S. Broadway, housed Blackstone's Department Store (1907–1917), Los Angeles County Library, and Cozy/Astro Theater (c. 1927–c. 1980)
- Trustee Building (1905, Parkinson and Bergstrom), 340 S. Broadway
- O. T. Johnson Block (1895, Robert Brown Young), 350 S. Broadway
- O. T. Johnson Building (1902, John Parkinson), 356–364 S. Broadway, 4th and Broadway

=== Fourth to Fifth ===
==== West side ====
- Junípero Serra State Office Building, (1915, Parkinson and Bergstrom), 4th and Broadway, housed The Broadway (1915–1973)
- Wilson Building (1909), 431 S. Broadway, housed Woolworth's
- former site of Zody's, 437 S. Broadway
- Metropolitan Building, (1913, Parkinson and Bergstrom), 5th and Broadway, housed a library (1913–1926), Owl Drug, and J. J. Newberry (unknown–late 1980s)

==== East side ====
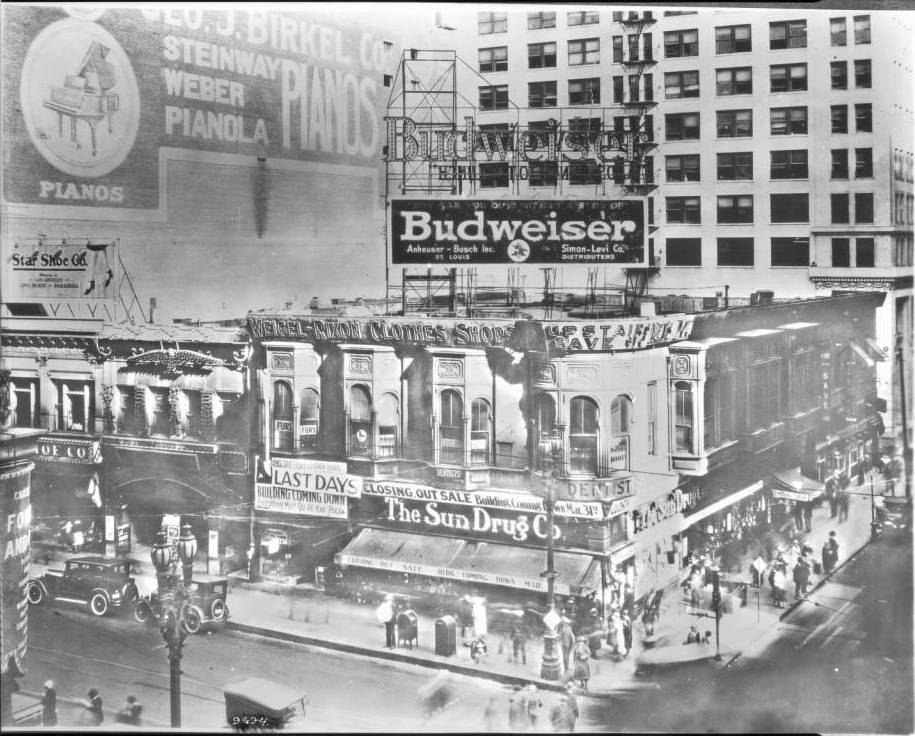
Broadway and 5th, early 1920s

- Perla on Broadway (2022), 400 S. Broadway, 4th and Broadway
- former site of the first Thrifty Drug Store, 412 S. Broadway
- Judson-Rives Building (1906, Charles Ronald Aldrich), 424 S. Broadway, ground floor housed Broadway Theatre (1924–1988)
- Bumiller Building (1906, Morgan & Walls), 430 S. Broadway
- Broadway Mall (1980s), 440 S. Broadway
- former site of a Parmalee-Dohrmann building, 440 S. Broadway
- Gebhard Building (c. 1900, Robert Brown Young), 450 S. Broadway
- Chester Williams Building (1926, Curlett & Beelman), 5th and Broadway

=== Fifth to Sixth ===
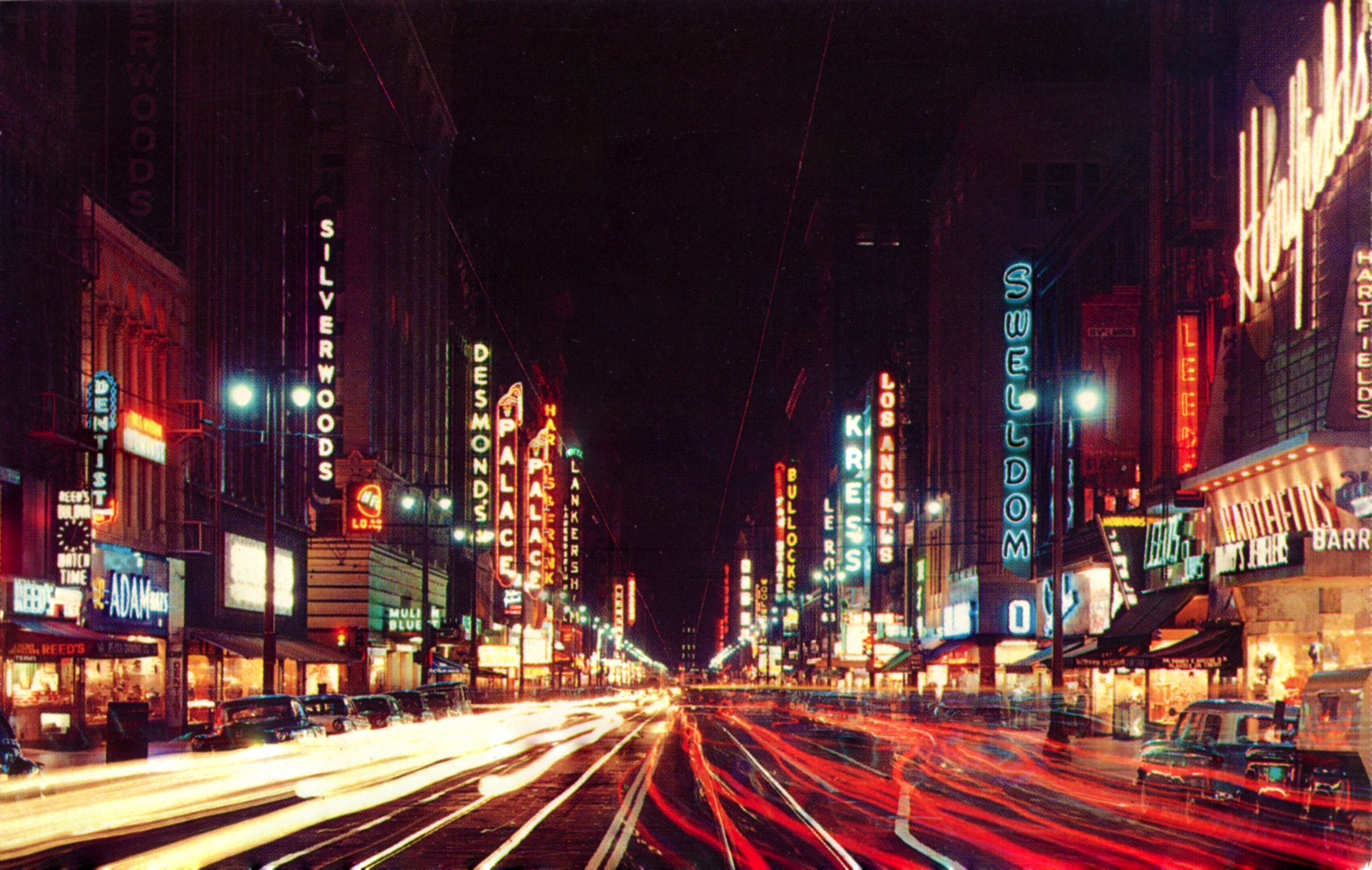
Broadway looking south from 5th, 1950s

==== West side ====
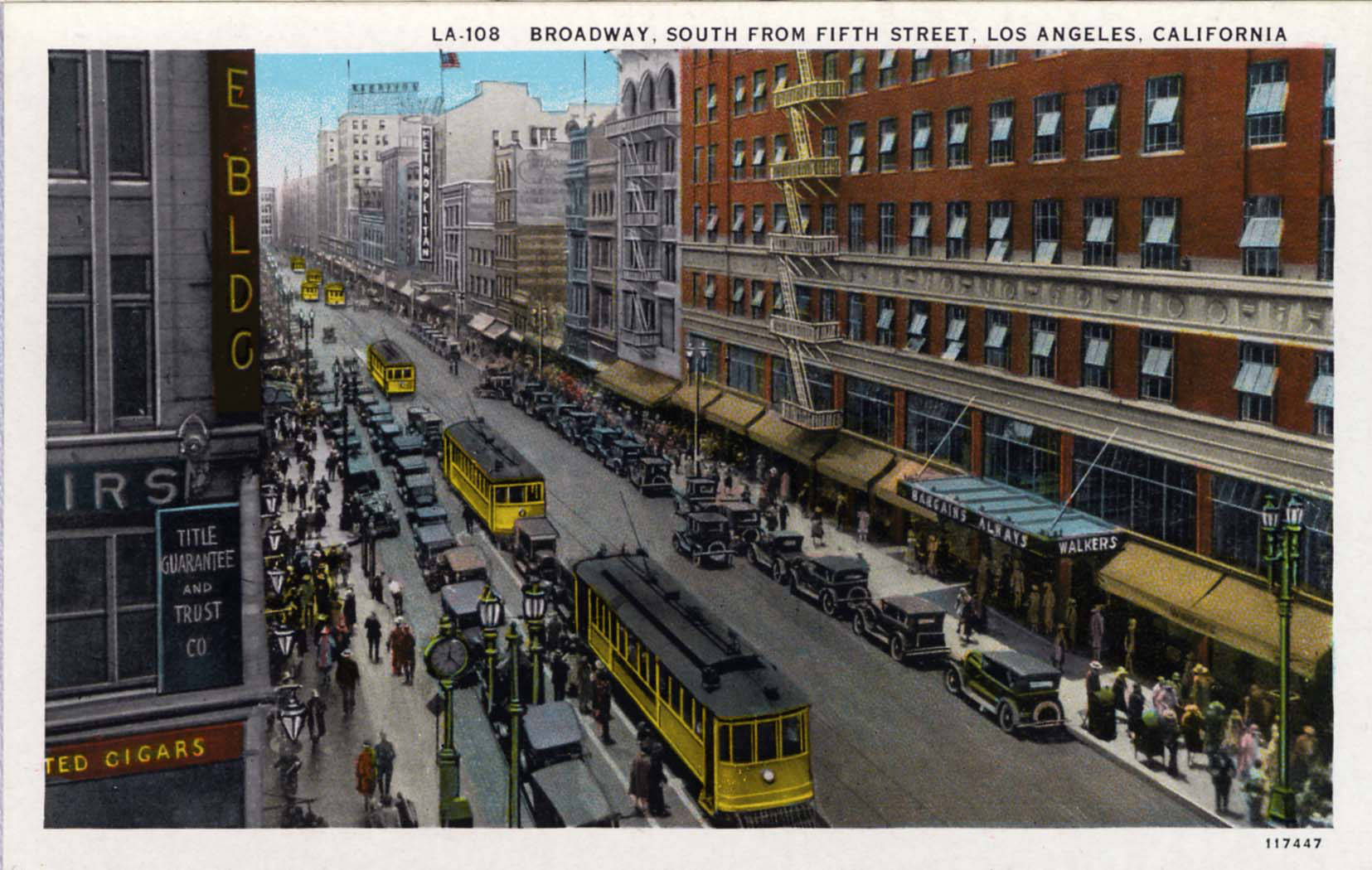
Postcard of the west side of Broadway looking south from 5th, 1927

- Fifth Street Store Building (1927, Alexander Curlett), 501 S. Broadway, housed Steele, Faris, & Walker Co. (1905–1909), Fifth Street Store (1909–1925), Walker's (1926–1946), Milliron's (1946–1953), and Ohrbach's (1953–1959)
- Remick Building (1902, Abram M. Edelman), 517–519 S. Broadway
- Reeves Building (1903, John Parkinson), 525 S. Broadway
- Schulte United Building (1928), 529 S. Broadway
- Lerners Building (1931, Philip Barker), 533 S. Broadway
- F. and W. Grand Silver Store Building (1931, Walker & Eisen), 537–541 S. Broadway, housed F. & W. Grand Silver (1931–1934), National Dollar (1934), Richman Brothers (1950s), and Hartfield-Zodys (1960s)
- former site of Clune’s Exclusive/Shell Theater (1909–unknown), 547 S. Broadway
- Swelldom Building (1920, Davis & Davis and Henry F. Withey), 555–561 S. Broadway, housed Swelldom

==== East side ====
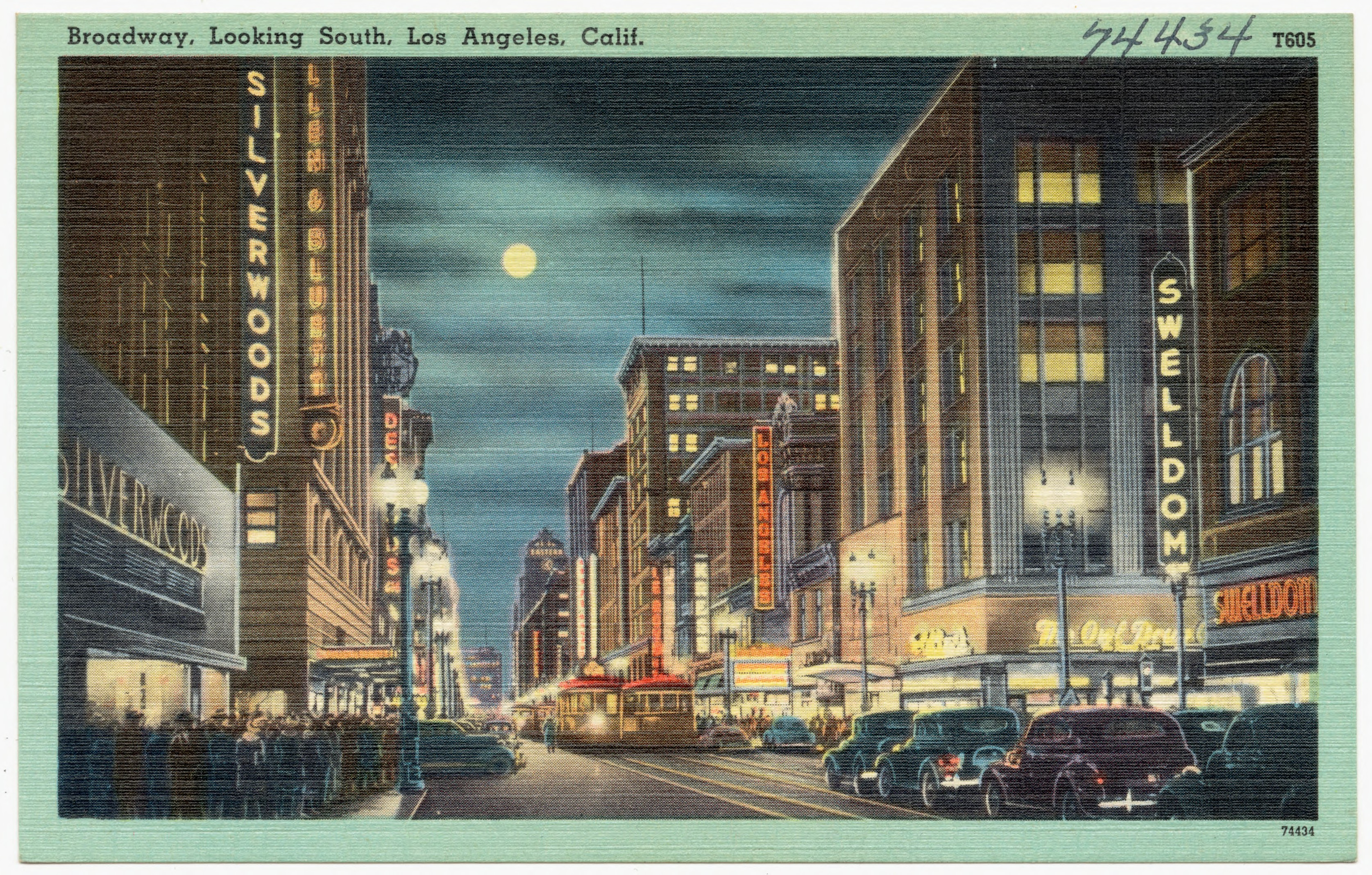
Postcard of Broadway looking south from 6th, c. 1930–45

- Jewelry Trades Building (1913, Morgan, Walls and Morgan), 500 S. Broadway
- Pettebone Building (1905, Robert Brown Young), 510–512 S. Broadway
- Roxie Theatre (1931, John M. Cooper), 518 S. Broadway, 1600-seat movie palace
- Cameo Theater (1910, Alfred Rosenheim), 528 S. Broadway, 900-seat Nickelodeon, converted to retail
- Arcade Theater (1910, Morgan and Walls), 534 S. Broadway, 1450-seat English-music-hall theater, converted to retail
- Broadway-Spring Arcade (1924, MacDonald and Couchot), 540 S. Broadway
- Hubert-Thom McAn Building (1900, John B. Parkinson), 546 S. Broadway
- former site of Tally's New Broadway, the "first real motion picture theater in Los Angeles" (1903–1910), 554 S. Broadway
- Silverwood's Building (1920, Walker and Eisen), 556–8 S. Broadway, housed Silverwoods

=== Sixth to Seventh ===
==== West side ====
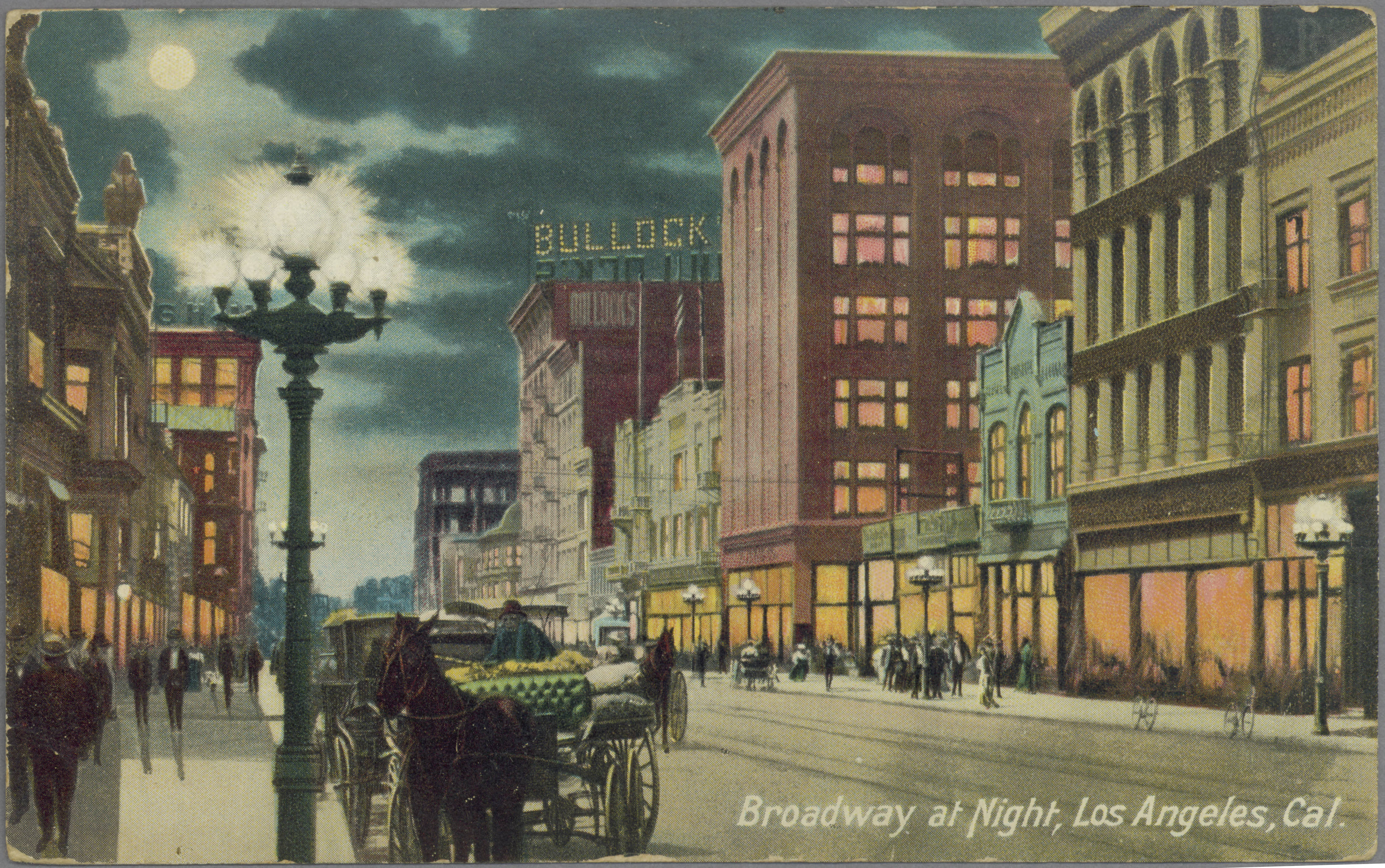
West side of Broadway's 600 block, c. 1907–9

- H. Jevne Company Building (1906–7, Parkinson and Bergstrom), 601–605 S. Broadway
- Los Angeles Theatre (1931, S. Charles Lee and S. Tilden Norton), 615 S. Broadway, 2000-seat movie palace
- Mailing's Building (1930, S. Charles Lee), 617–619 S. Broadway, housed Myer Siegel (c. 1921–1927)
- former site of S. H. Kress, 621–625 S. Broadway
- Hoffman Building (1906), 635–637 S. Broadway, housed Yamato Inc.
- Bullock's-Hollenbeck (1912, Morgan and Walls), 639 S. Broadway, housed Bullock's, now part of the St. Vincent's Jewelry Mart
- Bullock's Building (1906, Parkinson and Bergstrom), 641–651 S. Broadway, housed Bullock's, now part of the St. Vincent's Jewelry Mart

==== East side ====
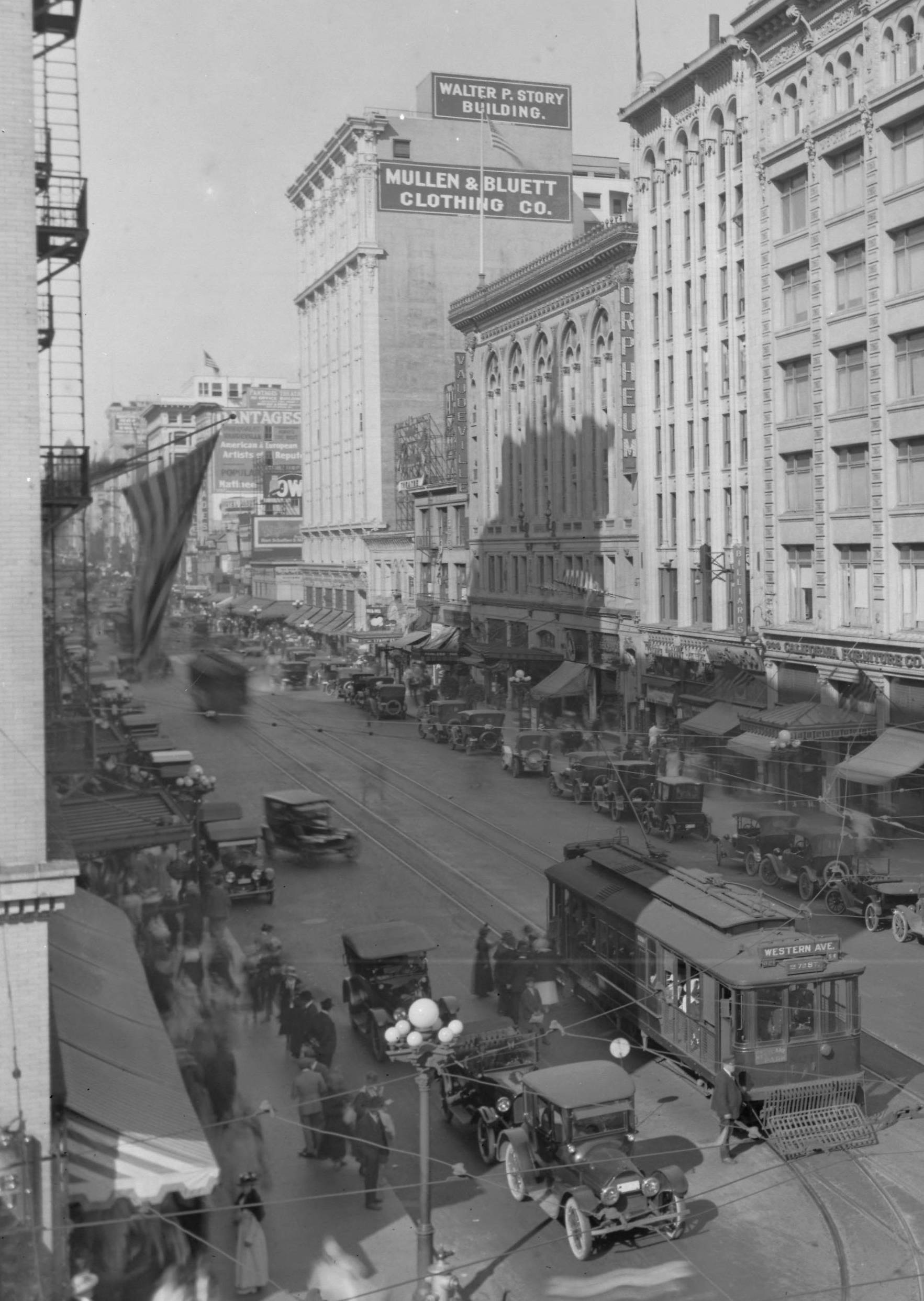
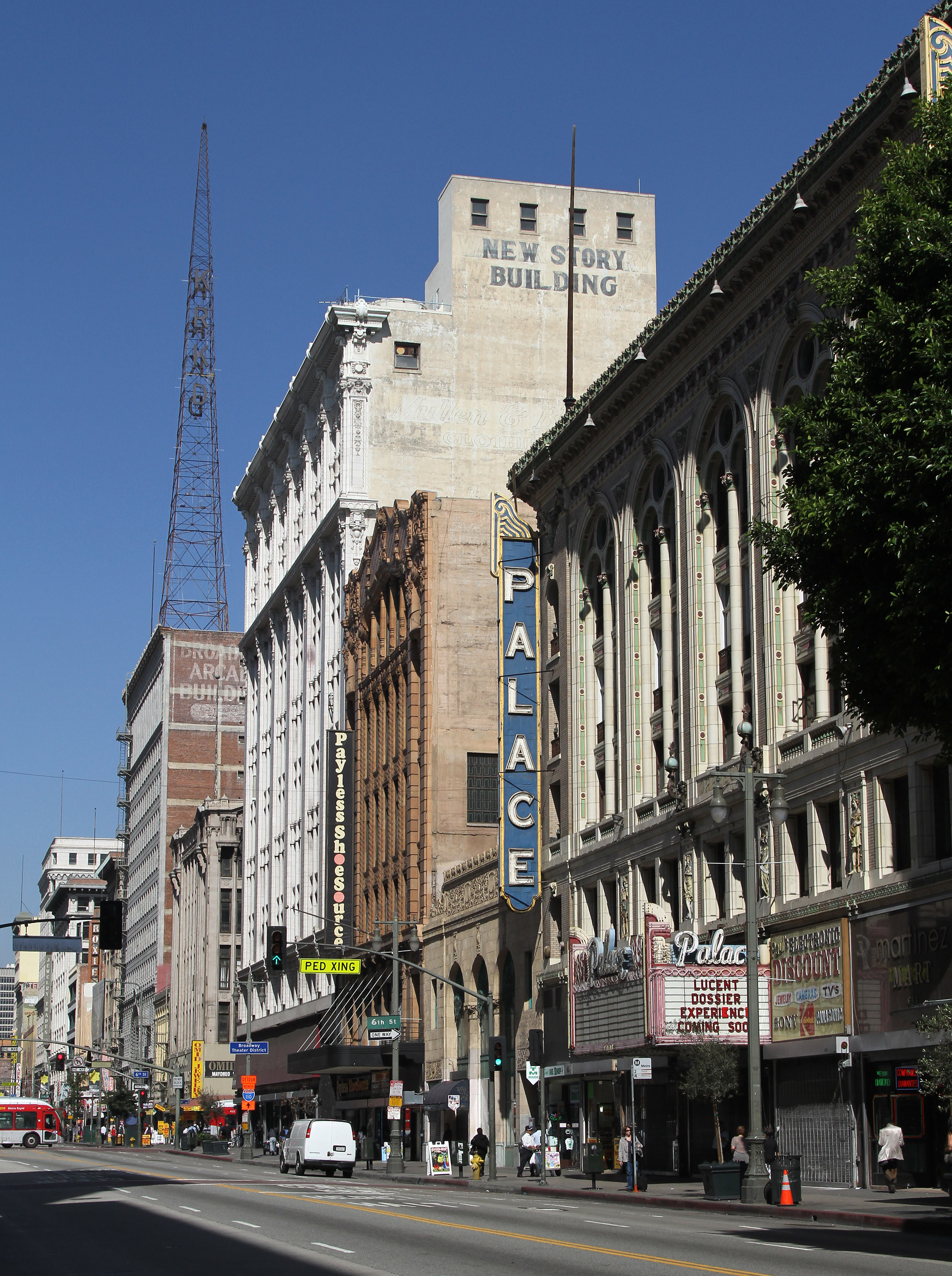
East side of Broadway's 600 block, 1923 (left) and 2012 (right)
- Walter P. Story Building (1909, Morgan & Walls) 600–610 S. Broadway, 6th and Broadway, housed Mullen & Bluett (1910–unknown)
- Desmond's Building (1924, Albert C. Martin, Sr.), 616 S. Broadway, housed Desmond's (1924–1981)
- Schaber's Cafeteria Building (1928, Charles F. Plummer), 620 S. Broadway
- Palace Theatre (1911, G. Albert Lansburgh), 630 S. Broadway, former 2200-seat, now 1068-seat vaudeville theater and movie palace
- Forrester Building (1907, Charles Frederick Whittlesey), 638 S. Broadway
- J. E. Carr Building (1908–9, Robert Brown Young), 644–646 S. Broadway, housed Harris & Frank (1947–1980)
- Clifton's Cafeteria (c. 1916), 648 S. Broadway, housed Clifton's Cafeteria and Boos Bros. Cafeteria
- Haas Building (1914, Morgan, Walls and Morgan), 660 S. Broadway

=== Seventh to Eighth ===
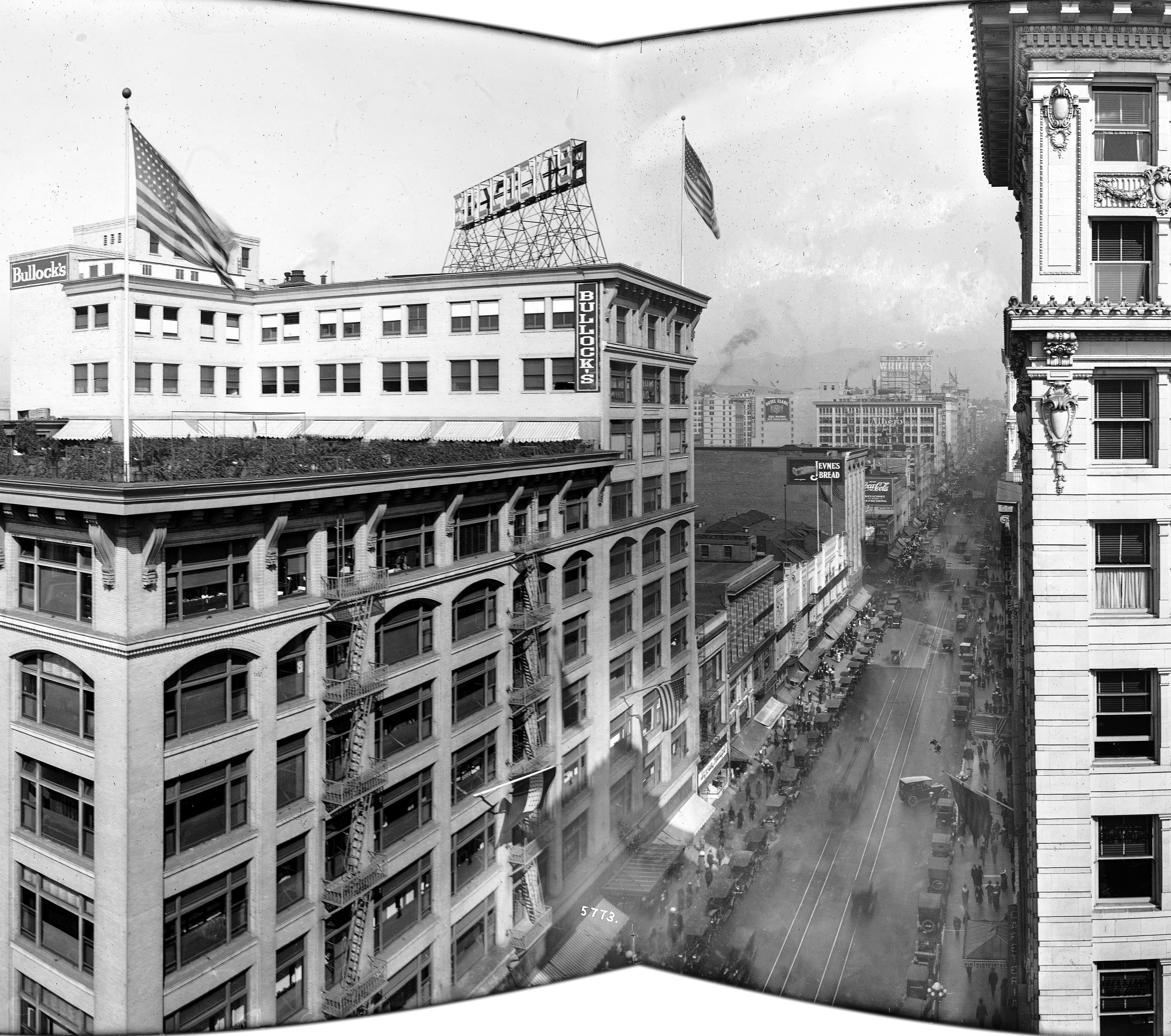
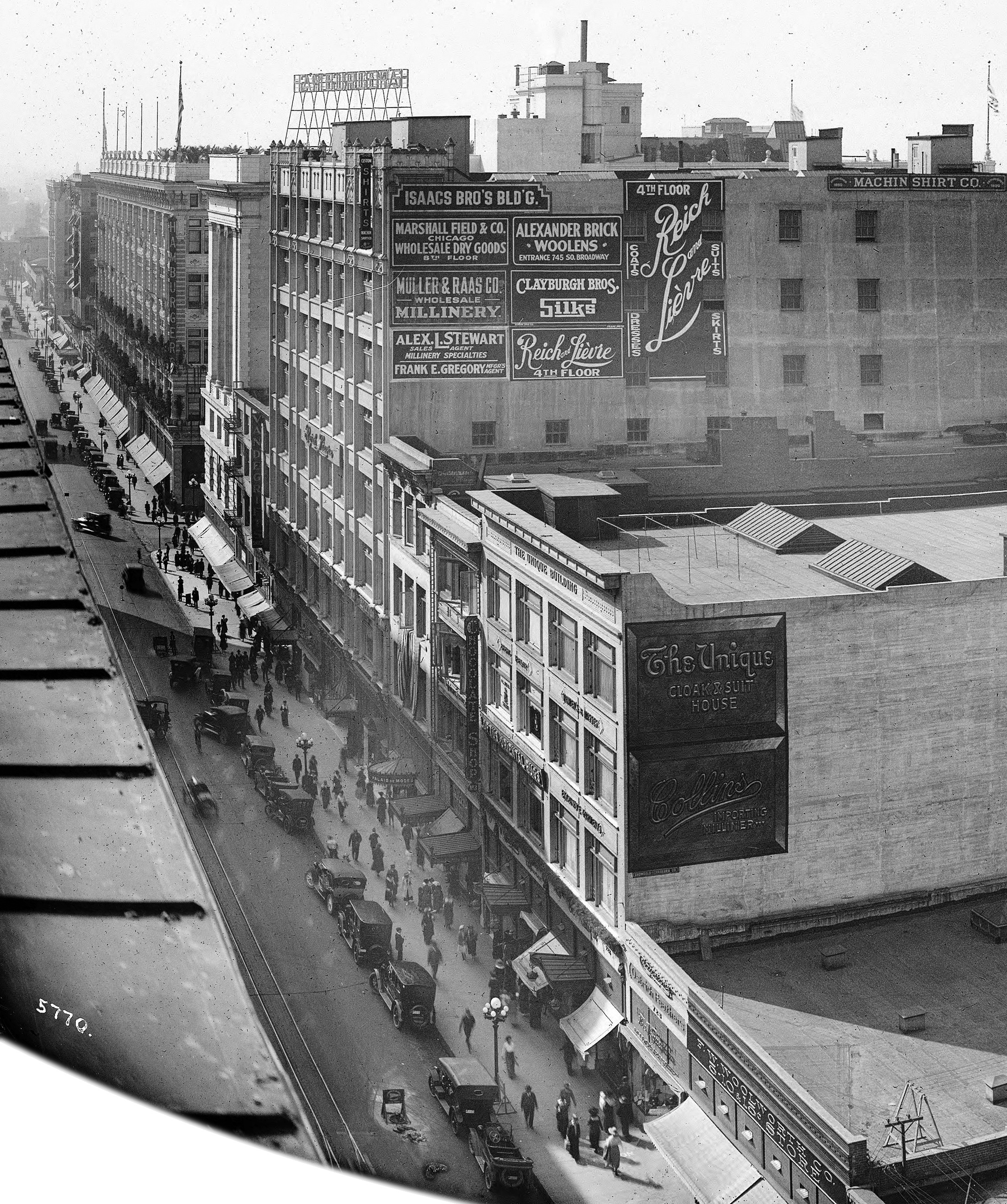
Broadway from 7th, 1917, looking north (left) and south (right)

==== West side ====
- State Theatre (1921, Weeks & Day), 703 S. Broadway. 2450-seat vaudeville theater and movie palace
- F.W. Woolworth Building (1920, Weeks & Day), 719 S. Broadway
- Cheney Block (1913), 731–733 S. Broadway
- Rowley Building (1908), 735 S. Broadway
- Issacs Building (1913), 739–745 S. Broadway, housed Reich and Lièvre (1917–unknown)
- former site of Hartfield's, 749 S. Broadway
- Merritt Building (1915, Reid & Reid), 761 S. Broadway

==== East side ====
- former site of Hotel Lankershim (1905–mid 1980s, Robert Brown Young), 700 S. Broadway
- Yorkshire Hotel (1909, Parkinson and Bergstrom), 710–714 S. Broadway
- Parmelee Building (1907, Parkinson and Bergstrom), 716 S. Broadway
- Barker Brothers Building (1909, Robert Brown Young), 722 S. Broadway
- Garland Building (1913, Morgan, Walls & Morgan), 744 S. Broadway, houses Globe Theatre (1913, Alfred Rosenheim), 782-seat theater
- Chapman Building (1912–3, Ernest McConnell), 756 S. Broadway

=== Eighth to Ninth ===
==== West side ====
- May Company Building (1906, Alfred F. Rosenheim), 829 S. Broadway
- former site of Tally's Broadway (1910–1928), 833 S. Broadway
- former site of Majestic Theatre (1908–1933, Edelman & Barnett), 845 S. Broadway
- Eastern Columbia Building (1930, Claud Beelman), 849 S. Broadway

==== East side ====
- former site of Garrick Theatre (1910–1927 or earlier, Train and Williams, remodeled by George Bergstrom in 1921), 802 S. Broadway
- Tower Theatre (1927, S. Charles Lee), 802 S. Broadway, originally a 1000-seat theater, converted to retail, houses an Apple Store (since 2015)
- Singer Building (1922, Meyer & Holler), 808 S. Broadway, bought by Singer Sewing Machine Company (1939)
- Rialto Theatre (1917, Oliver Perry Dennis, remodeled by William Lee Woollett in 1923), 812 S. Broadway, former nickelodeon, converted to retail
- Wurlitzer Building (1923, Walker and Eisen), 818 S. Broadway
- Braun Building (1913, Walter Jesse Saunders), 820–822 S. Broadway
- Platt Building (1927, Walker and Eisen), 830 S. Broadway
- former site of Woodley Theatre (1913–1925, Train and Williams, re-constructed by Frank Meline Company in 1920), 838—840 S. Broadway
- Orpheum Theatre (1926, G. Albert Lansburgh), 842 S. Broadway, 1976-seat theater
- Ninth and Broadway Building (1930, Claud Beelman), 850 S. Broadway

=== Ninth to Olympic ===
==== West side ====
- Blackstone's Department Store Building (1916, John and Donald Parkinson, first floor facade remodeled by Morgan, Walls & Clements in 1939), 901 S. Broadway
- Ace Hotel Los Angeles (1927, Walker & Eisen), 921–933 S. Broadway, houses United Artists Theater (1927, Charles Howard Crane), 2214-seat movie palace
- Western Costume Building (1925, Kenneth A. MacDonald Jr.), 939 S. Broadway

==== East side ====
- Broadway Leasehold Building (1914, Meyer & Holler), 908 S. Broadway

=== Olympic to Santa Monica Freeway ===
==== West side ====
- Herald-Examiner Building (1914, Julia Morgan), 11th and Broadway
- Los Angeles Public Works Building, 1149 S. Broadway

==== East side ====
- Los Angeles Railway Building (1925, Noerenberg & Johnson), 1060 S. Broadway, houses The Hoxton
- Proper Hotel (1926, Curlett & Beelman), 1100 S. Broadway

=== South of Santa Monica Freeway ===
- LA Mart (1958, Earl Heitschmidt), 1933 S. Broadway
- John Adams Middle School, 28th to 30th on Broadway
- Animo Jackie Robinson Charter High School, 35th to 36th on Broadway
- former site of Globe Department Store, 51st and Broadway
- Alliance Judy Ivie Burton Technology Academy High School, 101st to 102nd on Broadway
- Athens Park, 124th to El Segundo Blvd on Broadway

== Public transportation ==
Los Angeles Metro Rail's Historic Broadway station is an underground light rail station at 2nd and Broadway. The station is served by the E Line (east to East Los Angeles and west to Santa Monica) and A Line (northeast to Azusa and south to Long Beach).

Metro J Line bus rapid transit has five stations adjacent to Broadway: 37th Street, Slauson, Manchester, Harbor Freeway, and Rosecrans. These stations are all along the Harbor Transitway, a dedicated busway in the median of the Harbor Freeway, just west of Broadway. The J Line runs south to San Pedro and northeast to El Monte.

Metro Local line 45 serves Broadway between Lincoln Heights and the Harbor Freeway. Local routes 4, 30, and 40 also serve portions of Broadway.

== See also ==
- Broadway Theater District (Los Angeles)
- List of contributing properties in the Broadway Theater and Commercial District
