= Hulett C. Merritt =

American businessman (1872–1956)

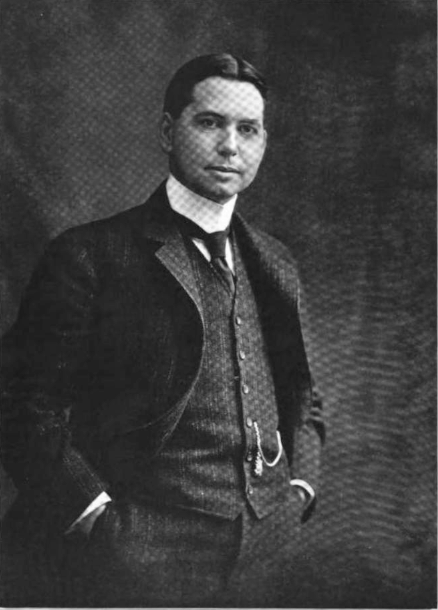
- Born: August 17, 1872; Duluth, Minnesota, U.S.
- Died: January 13, 1956 (aged 83); Santa Barbara, California, U.S.
- Resting place: Mountain View Cemetery, Altadena, California, U.S.
- Occupation: Businessman
- Spouse: Rosaline Ollivier
- Children: 1 son
- Parent: Louis J. Merritt

Hulett Clinton Merritt (August 17, 1872 – January 13, 1956) was an American real estate developer, investor, rancher and art collector. He sold real estate in his hometown of Duluth, Minnesota, developed Texas City, Texas, with other businessmen, and invested in real estate in Los Angeles, California, where he built the Merritt Building. He was a director and large shareholder of U.S. Steel. As a majority shareholder of the United Electric and Power Company, he installed electricity and gas in 17 cities in California, including Santa Barbara and San Diego. He owned a large ranch in Tulare County.

== Early life ==
Hulett C. Merritt was born on August 17, 1872, in Duluth, Minnesota. His father, Louis J. Merritt, discovered the Mesabi Range with others. He was also a business partner of John D. Rockefeller, with whom he invested in mining, railroads and steamships in the Great Lakes. Merritt had a brother, Lewis N. Merritt, and two sisters.

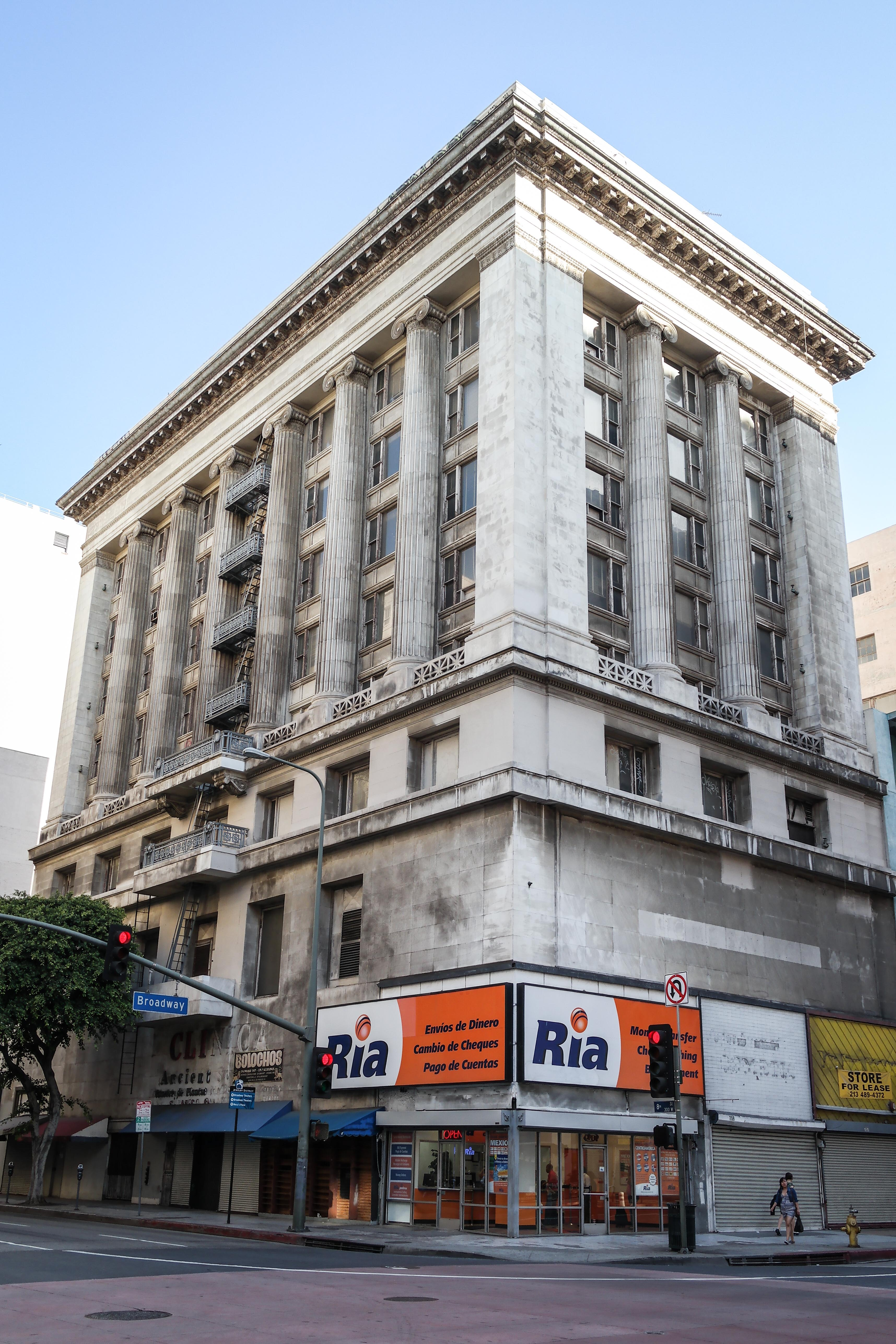
The Merritt Building in Downtown Los Angeles

== Career ==
Merritt began his career by working for his father at the age of 16. Father and son built the Mesabi, Duluth and Northwestern Railway. Upon his father's death, Merritt inherited the entire Mesabi Range, and he became Rockefeller's partner. The two men subsequently sold the range to U.S. Steel for US$81 million.

Merritt sold real estate in Duluth, and he developed Texas City, Texas, with other investors. Upon moving to California in 1897, he invested in real estate in Los Angeles, California. He built the Merritt Building in Downtown Los Angeles in 1915. He also built a racing speedway, and as an amateur he once won a race against Barney Oldfield. Additionally, he owned an antique store in Pasadena, California.

Merritt joined the board of directors of U.S. Steel at the age of 28, and he became its largest common stockholder. He also served as its chairman.

In 1900, Merritt purchased 70% of the United Electric and Power Company, and he installed electricity and gas in 17 cities in California, including Santa Barbara and San Diego. He subsequently sold the company to Southern California Edison.

Merritt was the owner of the 7,000-acre Tagus Ranch in Tulare County, where he grew peaches. One year, he sold 10% of the world's output of canned peaches. He also invested in gold, silver, iron, coal and chromium mines as well as paper mills, banks, hotels, restaurants, merchandising, manufacturing, steamships, sugar, cattle-raising, and fisheries.

== Personal life and death ==
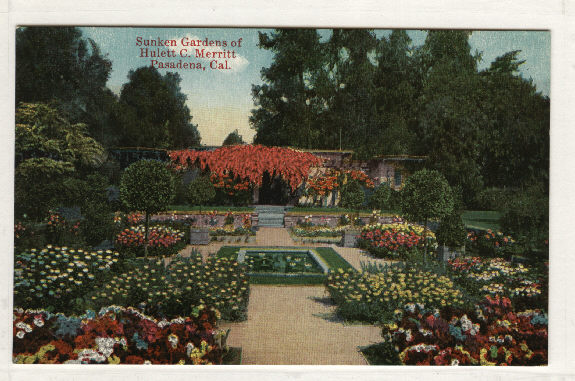
Gardens of the Hulett C. Merritt mansion in Pasadena

Merritt married Rosaline Ollivier of Saginaw, Michigan, in July 1892. She was the granddaughter of Démosthène Ollivier, a businessman from Marseille, France, and the niece of French Prime Minister Émile Ollivier. They resided at the Hulett C. Merritt mansion in Pasadena, California. They had a son, Hulett C. Merritt Jr., who served in World War I and managed the Tagus Ranch; he predeceased them in 1945. His wife predeceased him in 1954.

Merritt was a large art collector. He also collected French and English antique furniture and Napoleonic papers. He was a member of the Annandale Golf Club, the Bolsa Chica Gun Club, and the California Club. He was also the chairman of the board of the Pasadena Methodist Church. He supported the Rose Parade and the East–West Shrine Game.

Merritt died on January 13, 1956, in Santa Barbara, at the age of 83. He was buried in the Mountain View Cemetery in Altadena, California. He was survived by his brother Huntington of Stockton, his sister Evelyn Reed of El Cerrito, four grandchildren and seven great-grandchildren.

Merritt was worth an estimated US$6,000,000 (equivalent to about $69,392,900 in 2024) by the time of his death. His estate was inherited by his four grandchildren and seven great-grandchildren. However, they were required to file affidavits saying they had not smoked or drunk alcohol in 90 days before receiving their share on a quarterly basis. The male heirs would also have to change their surnames to Merritt before the age of 22 if they had a different name at the time of his death.
