= LA Mart =

Historic building in Los Angeles

- Interactive map of the LA Mart area

General information
- Architectural style: Modern
- Location: 1933 S Broadway; Los Angeles, California; United States
- Coordinates: 34°01′53″N 118°16′00″W
- Inaugurated: May 28, 1958; 67 years ago
- Cost: US$7,350,000 ($82,020,000 in 2025)

Technical details
- Floor count: 12
- Floor area: 900,000 square feet (84,000 m^{2})

Design and construction
- Architect: Earl Heitschmidt

The LA Mart is a historic furniture mart building located at 1933 S Broadway in Los Angeles, California. The 12-story structure was opened in 1958 as the Los Angeles Furniture Mart and was the largest commercial structure made of reinforced concrete in the city at the time.

== History ==
In April 1956, a groundbreaking ceremony took place for a new Los Angeles Furniture Mart building on a 4.25 acres (1.72 ha) site at the corner of Broadway and Washington Boulevard. The facility replaced its previous iteration which was located at 2155 E 7th Street. The Los Angeles Times reported a construction cost of $7,000,000 and that the new furniture mart would be one of the largest in the United States upon completion. Earl Heitschmidt designed the building, J. A. McNeil Company of Alhambra, California, served as general contractor for the project, and Bank of America financed the construction. Prudential Insurance was its first owner.

The facility, with space for 600 retailers and costing a total of $7,350,000 ($82,020,000 in 2025), was dedicated at a May 28, 1958, ceremony emceed by Furniture Manufacturers Association of Southern California president Henry Brandler and attended by Los Angeles mayor Norris Poulson. On March 17, 1959, less than a year after opening, the facility's name was changed to Los Angeles Home Furnishings Mart.

In 1978, International Fastener Research Corporation (IFRC) purchased the building for $1,500,000 ($7,404,000 in 2025), undertaking renovations of the space and expanding the facility's scope into the giftware industry. Changes included new lighting and safety improvements on the fire suppression system and elevators. Brandler, a founding executive, remained on as the mart's president after the purchase.

In 2020, LA Mart owner Ara Tavitian installed large digital billboards on three sides of the top of the building, each several stories tall and spanning the entire width of each frontage. The project faced pushback from city planning commissioners and generated backlash from the surrounding neighborhood. Residents nearby complained of the harsh glare from the billboards that made sleeping difficult. Jorge Nuño, a former city council election opponent against Curren Price, said that the advertisements create a dangerous distraction for motorists on nearby Interstate 10. Price received criticism for alleged corruption in connection with the billboards, as he had secured approval for the installation and later received a $75,000 campaign contribution from Tavitian through an associated political action committee.
