= Hoffman Building (Los Angeles) =

Building in Los Angeles, California

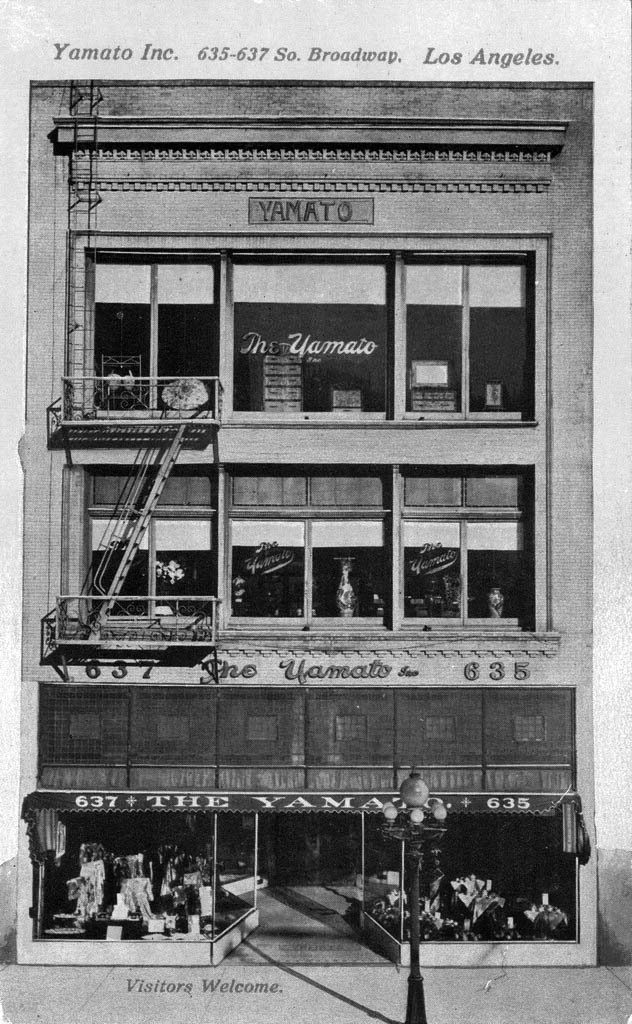
- Postcard of the building in 1910

- Location within the Los Angeles metropolitan area

General information
- Location: 635-637 S. Broadway, Los Angeles, California
- Coordinates: 34°02′46″N 118°15′11″W
- Completed: 1906

Hoffman Building, also known as The Yamato, is a historic building located at 635-637 S. Broadway in the Broadway Theater District in the historic core of downtown Los Angeles.

== History ==
Hoffman Building, built in 1906, was originally four-stories and currently is one. It was originally home to Yamato Inc., a Japanese bazaar that also served tea and cake, and then a Harry Fink & Co. women's clothing store in 1917.

In 1979, the Broadway Theater and Commercial District was added to the National Register of Historic Places, with Hoffman Building listed as a non-contributing property in the district.

== Architecture and design ==
Hoffman Building is built of brick. The building originally featured display windows that flanked its entrance and a fire escape on its top two stories, and its facade, while updated, was similar to the original as of 1979.
