= Karl's Building =

Building in Los Angeles, California

- Karl's
- Former U.S. Historic district – Contributing property
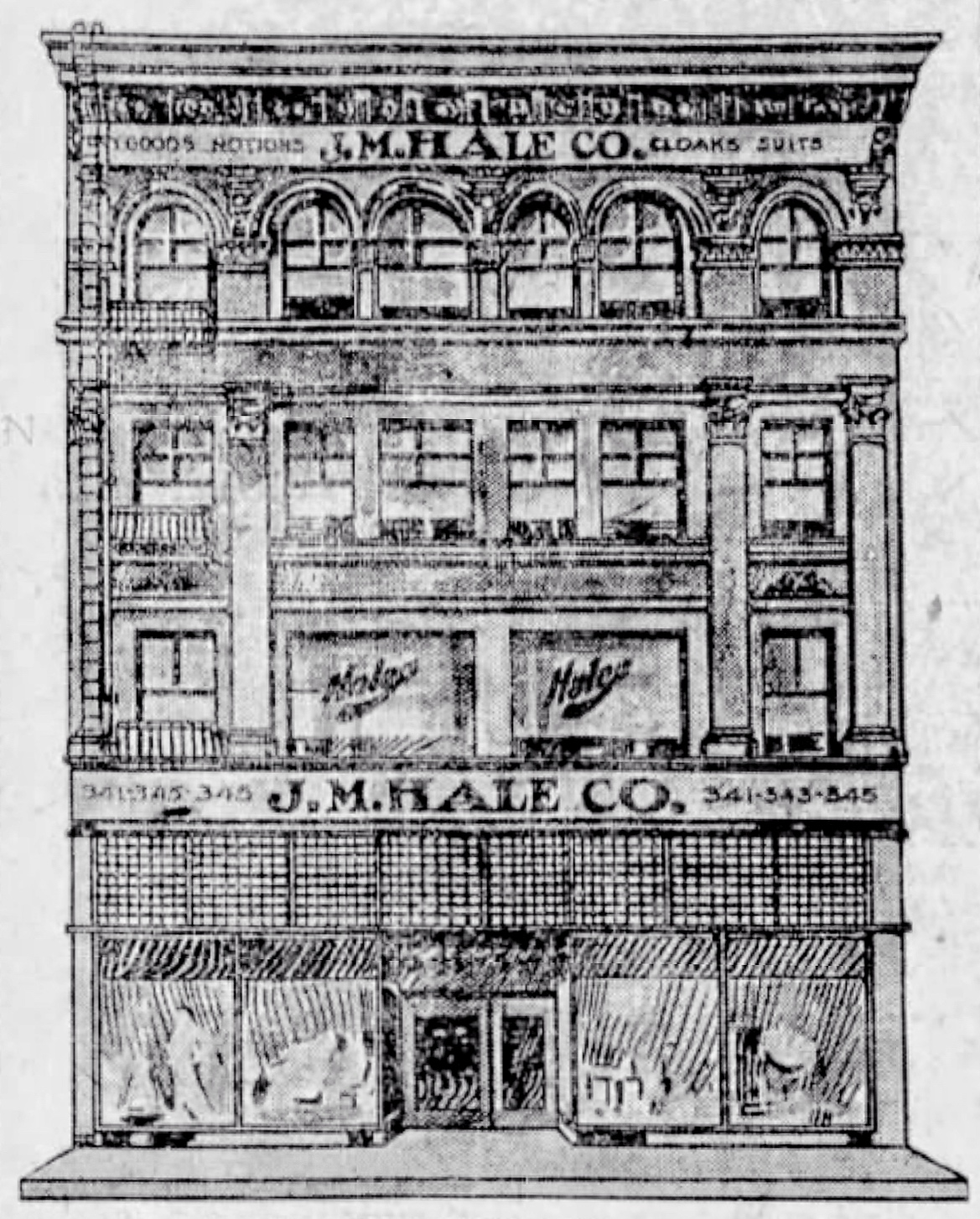
- Sketch of the building in 1908

- Location within the Los Angeles metropolitan area
- Location: 341-345 S. Broadway, Los Angeles, California
- Coordinates: 34°03′01″N 118°14′57″W
- Built: 1903
- Architect: Abram M. Edelman
- Part of: Broadway Theater and Commercial District (ID79000484)

Significant dates
- Designated CP: May 9, 1979
- Delisted CP: April 12, 2002

Karl's, also known as Karl's Shoes, is a historic two-story building located at 341-345 S. Broadway in the Broadway Theater District in the historic core of downtown Los Angeles.

== History ==
Karl's was built in 1903 as a four story structure by Abram M. Edelman and featured several modern conveniences of the day, including electric elevators and plate glass windows. The building was later reduced to two stories, but even so, it retained much of its original brick and terra cotta design.

J. M. Hale leased the building from 1908 to 1918.

In 1979, the Broadway Theater and Commercial District was added to the National Register of Historic Places, with Karl's listed as a contributing property in the district. The building was delisted in 2002 when the district was updated to include an expansion. The delisting notes that the second story's original windows were replaced by aluminum-frame ones and that much of the building's ornamentation was removed when it was reduced to two stories.

== See also ==
- List of contributing properties in the Broadway Theater and Commercial District
