= Victor Clothing Company Building =

Historic building in downtown Los Angeles

- Victor Clothing Company
- U.S. Historic district – Contributing property
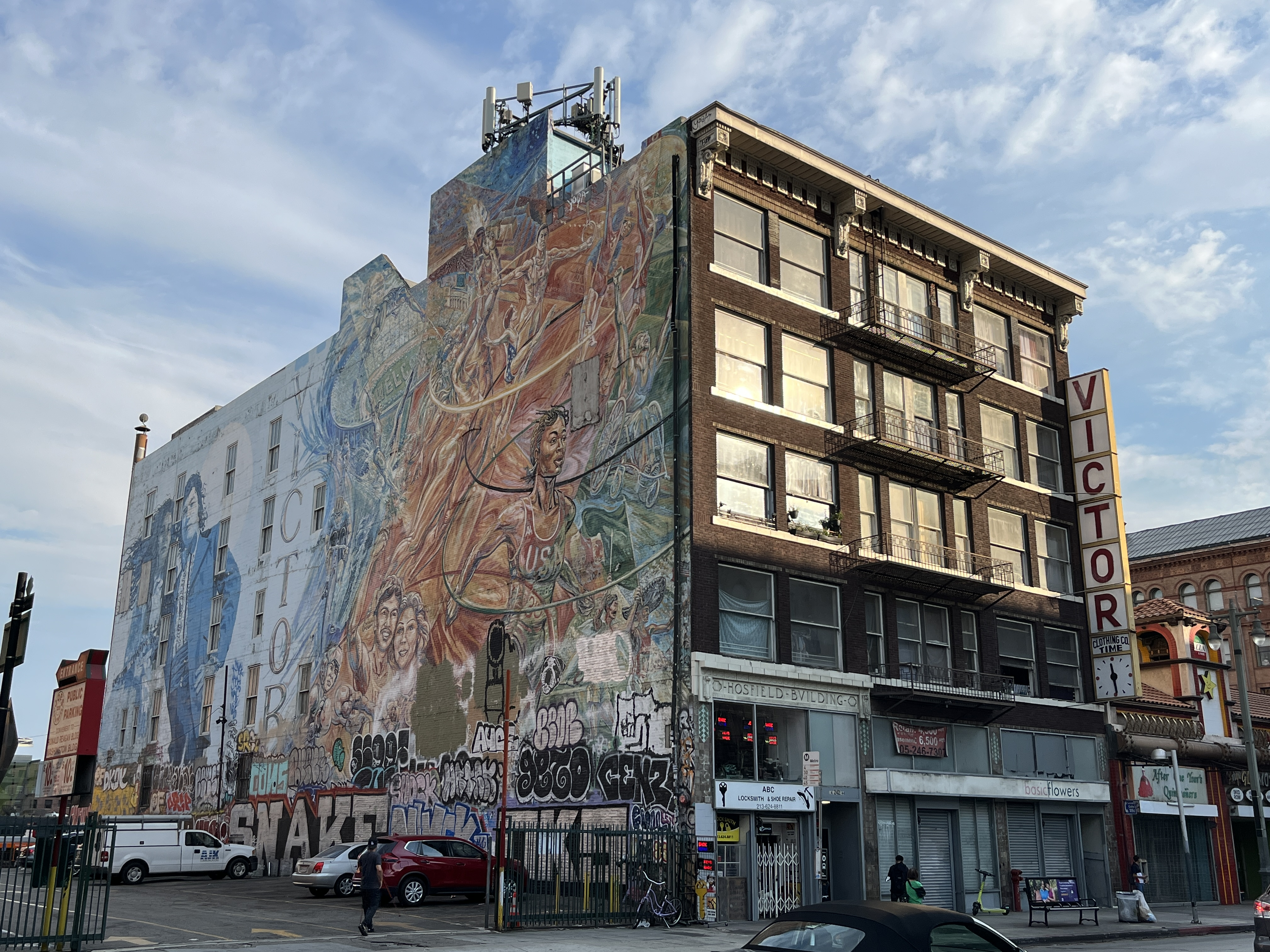
- The building in 2022

- Location within the Los Angeles metropolitan area
- Location: 242 S. Broadway, Los Angeles, California
- Coordinates: 34°03′06″N 118°14′51″W
- Built: 1914
- Architect: Train & Williams
- Architectural style: Vernacular with Beaux Arts elements
- Part of: Broadway Theater and Commercial District (ID02000330)
- Designated CP: April 12, 2002

Victor Clothing Company, formerly City Hall North, also known as Hosfield Building and Victor Clothing Lofts, is a historic five-story building located at 242 S. Broadway in the Broadway Theater District in the historic core of downtown Los Angeles.

== History ==
The Victory Clothing Company building was designed by Robert Farquhar Train and Robert Edmund Williams for Mr. & Mrs. J.F. Hosfield and built in 1914. The building was originally built as a City Hall annex, but by 2002 it contained ground-floor retail, second-story mezzanines for storage, and lofts on the third through fifth stories.

In 1964, Victor Clothing moved into the building and made it their headquarters.

The Victor Clothing Company building was not listed in the National Register of Historic Places's Broadway Theater and Commercial District when it was first created in 1979, but it was included when the district was expanded in 2002.

The building was put up for sale in 1995 and sold to Nathan Korman in 2001. All tenants, including Victor Clothing, were evicted following the sale, after which the building's upper floors were converted to live/work lofts. Korman said that he bought the building in part because of its murals, which he wanted to preserve.

In 2009, the building was rehabilitated at a cost of $8 million ($12 million in 2025). In 2014, the building was awarded $20,788 ($28,272 in 2025) through the Bringing Back Broadway initiative to accent its decorative roof eaves.

=== Murals ===
From the mid-1970s to 1984, three large murals were added to the building's exterior. They are:

- The Bride and Groom by Kent Twitchell (1973-1976), 70-by-70-foot (21 by 21 m), northern wall, commissioned by second-floor tenant Carlos Ortiz for $5000 ($32,642 in 2025)
- Anthony Quinn in The Pope of Broadway by Eloy Torrez (1984), 70-by-60-foot (21 by 18 m), eastern half of southern wall
- Nino y Caballo (A vision expressing freedom and joy) by Frank Romero (1984), 40-by-70-foot (12 by 21 m), western half of southern wall

A fourth mural was added sometime between 1985 and 2001.

In 2014, The Pope of Broadway was restored at a cost of $150,000 ($203,999 in 2025), spearheaded by the Los Angeles Mural Conservancy and paid for by Greenland USA.

== Architecture and design ==
Victor Clothing Company is made of reinforced concrete with a brick facade, and was designed in the vernacular style with Beaux Arts elements in its massing and detailing. Specific designs in the building include:

- a flat roof surrounded by a parapet
- a base-anchored facade
- non-original large, plate glass windows inside thin metal frames
- a continuous white brick stringcourse that separates the base and the remaining facade
- a brown brick body that includes three bays of paired wood-framed windows with white brick windowsills
- an ornamental ironwork fire escape affixed to the central bay
- an overhanging cornice punctuated by four corbels that correspond to the divisions of the three bays.

The building faces west, and its north and south exterior walls are covered with large murals, while the west and east exteriors are not. The building's original sign and clock remain in place.

The condition and integrity of the building is considered good.

== In popular culture ==
This building is featured in the Enlightened episode 'All I Ever Wanted.'

== See also ==
- List of contributing properties in the Broadway Theater and Commercial District
