= Merritt Building =

Historic building in downtown Los Angeles

- U.S. Historic district – Contributing property
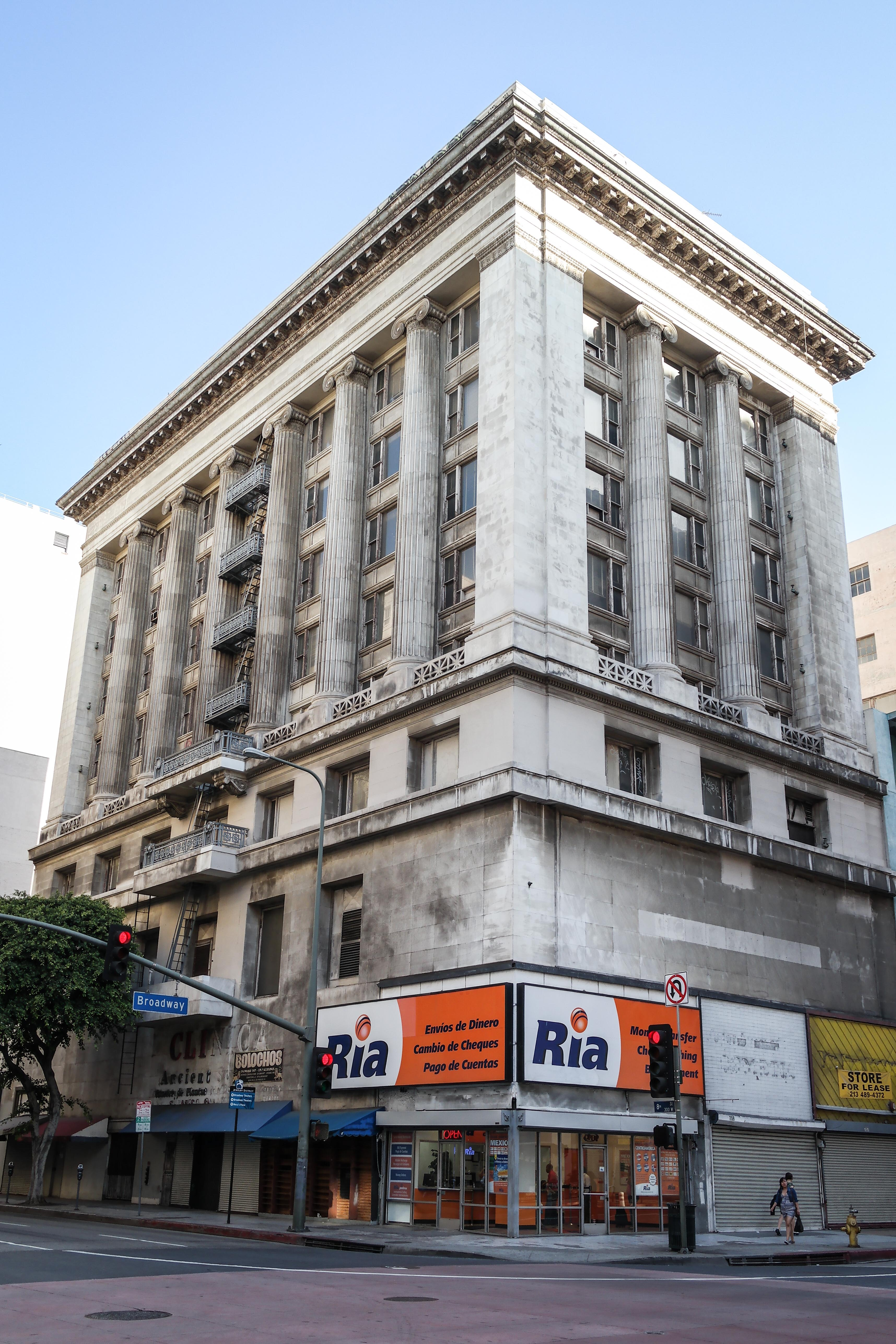
- The building in 2014

- Location within the Los Angeles metropolitan area
- Location: 761 S. Broadway and 301 W. Eighth Street, Los Angeles, California
- Coordinates: 34°02′39″N 118°15′18″W
- Built: 1915
- Architect: Reid & Reid
- Architectural style: Neoclassical / Italian Renaissance / Beaux Arts
- Part of: Broadway Theater and Commercial District (ID79000484)
- Designated CP: May 9, 1979

The Merritt Building is a historic building located at 761 S. Broadway and 301 W. Eighth Street in the Jewelry District and Broadway Theater District in the historic core of downtown Los Angeles.

== History ==
The Merritt Building was built by Reid & Reid in 1915 and was named after its owner Hulett C. Merritt. Merritt originally wanted the building to contain 23 stories at a height of 233 feet (71 m), but Los Angeles City Council refused to waive the city's 180-foot (55 m) building height ordinance, and so Merritt built a 9-story (plus one below-ground story), 144-foot (44 m) building instead. Upon completion, the building contained ground-floor retail with offices above, with the top floor reserved for Merritt himself.

In December 1956, Home Savings and Loan Association purchased the building, after which they modernized the lower floors and added a Millard Sheets–designed entrance on Broadway.

In 1979, the Broadway Theater and Commercial District was added to the National Register of Historic Places, with Merritt Building listed as a contributing property in the district.

In 2016, the building was purchased by Bonnis Properties for $24 million.

== Architecture and design ==
Merritt Building is made of concrete and steel with a Yule Marble facade. It was designed in the Neoclassical/Italian Renaissance/Beaux Arts style and features ionic columns and heavy cornice that create a rendition of the Temple of Minerva on a three-story plinth. Each floor is separated by a prominent belt course, and the building's second story originally featured prominent rustication; however, this was covered by smooth masonry when the building was modernized following its purchase by the Home Savings and Loan Association.

== See also ==
- List of contributing properties in the Broadway Theater and Commercial District
