= Eloy Torrez =

American painter

- Born: 1954 (age 71–72); Albuquerque, New Mexico
- Education: Otis College of Art and Design
- Occupation: Artist
- Years active: 1983–present

Eloy Torrez (born 1954) is an American artist best known as the creator of several murals in and around Los Angeles, California.

== Early life and education ==
Eloy Torrez was born in Albuquerque, New Mexico in 1954 and he and his family moved to California at age 13. He enrolled in community college in Barstow, where in his art classes he went on several field trips to the Norton Simon Museum and Los Angeles County Museum of Art. In 1973, he moved to Los Angeles to study at Otis College of Art and Design, and he earned his Bachelors of Fine Arts in 1977.

Torrez credits Otis professor Charles White as his greatest influence.

== Career ==
Torrez began his career restoring murals, then transitioned to creating murals of his own. Some of Torrez's murals include:

- Legends of Hollywood (1983), destroyed during the 1994 Northridge earthquake
- The Pope of Broadway (1984), on the Victor Clothing Company Building in the Broadway Theater District in downtown Los Angeles
- Aztec Princess (1990), in Vernon, California
- Entrada a un Nuevo Mundo (1991), in St. Denis, France, sponsored by the French Ministry of Culture
- Water, essence of life (1998), inside the Metropolitan Water District Building in downtown Los Angeles
- Portrait of Hollywood (2003), on the Hollywood High School auditorium in Hollywood, California
- The Steps We Take (2014), at Los Angeles Metro's El Monte station
- Five Veteran’s Stories (in progress), in Los Angeles Metro's Westwood/VA Hospital station

Torrez has also created works in Mexico and Spain.

== See also ==
- List of people from Los Angeles
