= Victor Clothing =

Clothing store

Victor Clothing Company
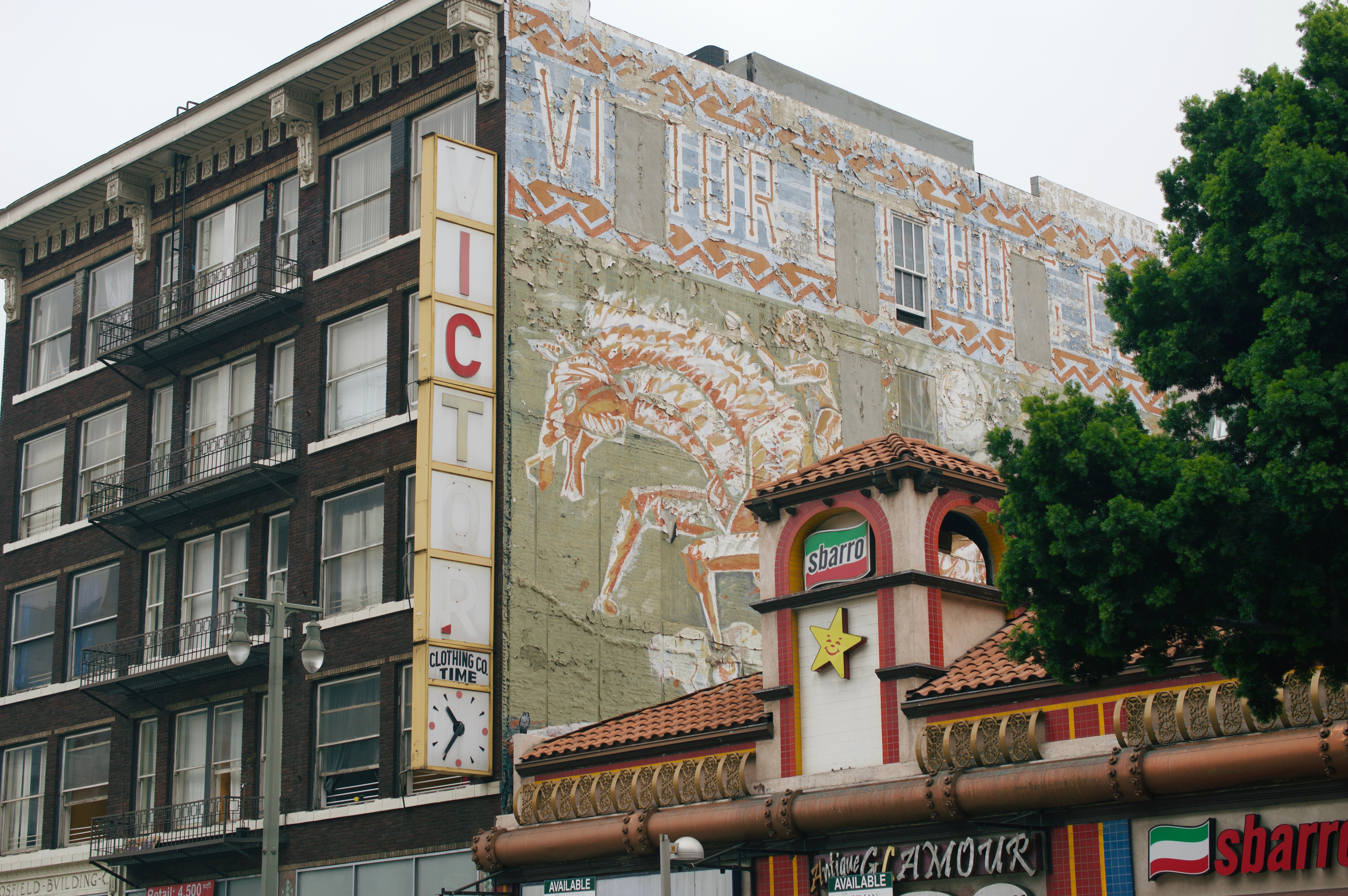
- Company type: Retail clothing store
- Industry: Retail
- Founded: 1926
- Defunct: 2001
- Fate: Closed due to decreased customer traffic
- Headquarters: 242 S. Broadway, Downtown Los Angeles, California
- Products: Men's suits, furs, dresses
- Services: Retail clothing sales

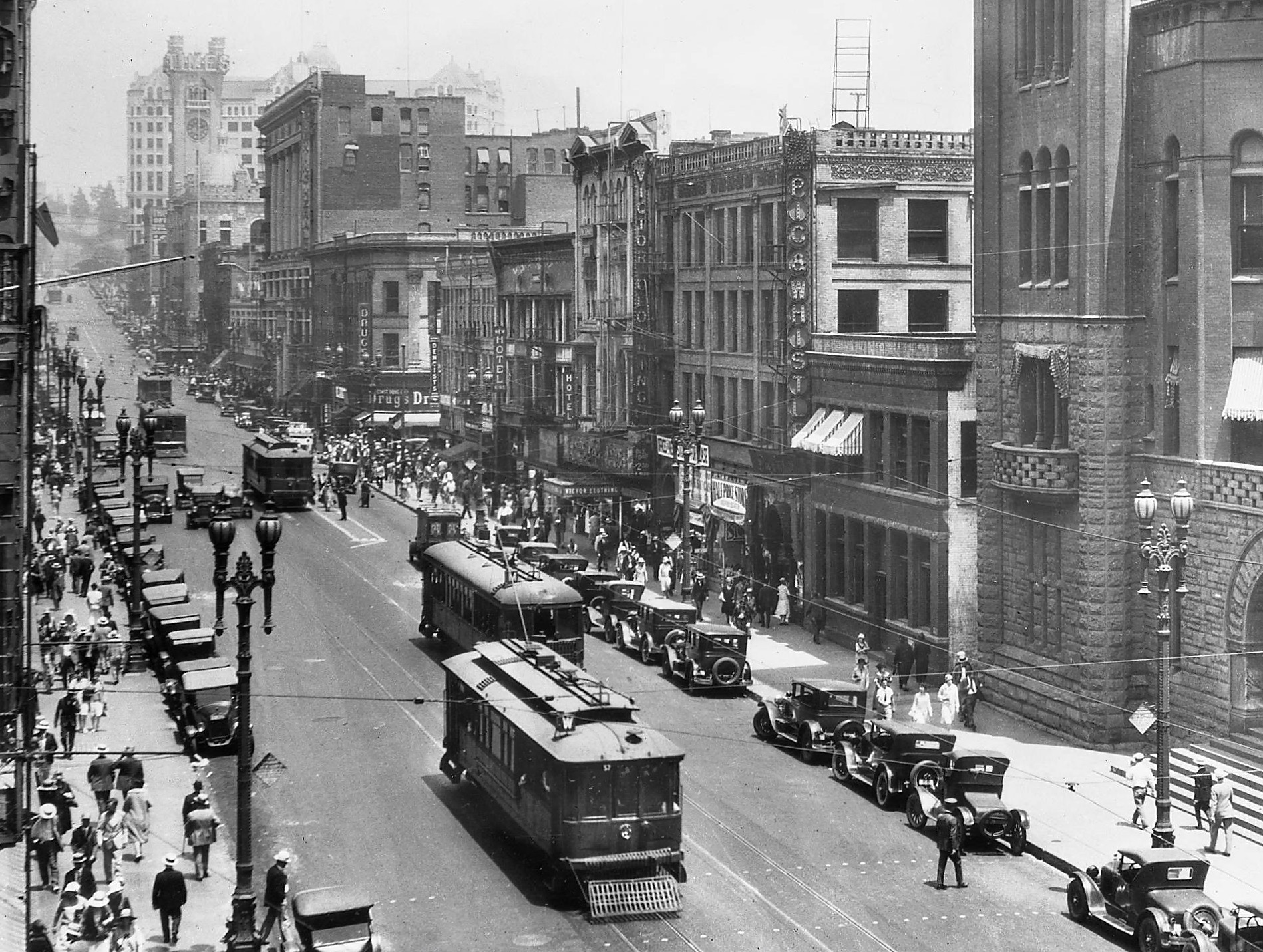
Looking north along Broadway at its east side past 2nd Street in the c. mid-1920s. Mid-block, Victor Clothing in its location from 1926–1964 in the Crocker Bldg. (#212–6). Pig 'n Whistle in the Copp Bldg. (#218–224). 1888 City Hall at far right.

Victor Clothing was a retail clothing store located in the Crocker Building at 212–6 S. Broadway, Downtown Los Angeles from 1926 to 1964 and in the Victor Clothing Company Building at 242 S. Broadway from 1964 to 2001.

The store reached its heyday in the 1940s and '50s when Broadway was the city's main retail and commercial street and "The Victor" employed more than 50 workers and stocked thousands of men's suits and some furs and dresses for women. In its last decades it was a frequent advertiser on local Spanish-language television. The store closed in 2001, according to the owner due to shrinking customer traffic in the area.
