= Hartfield-Zodys =

American department store chain

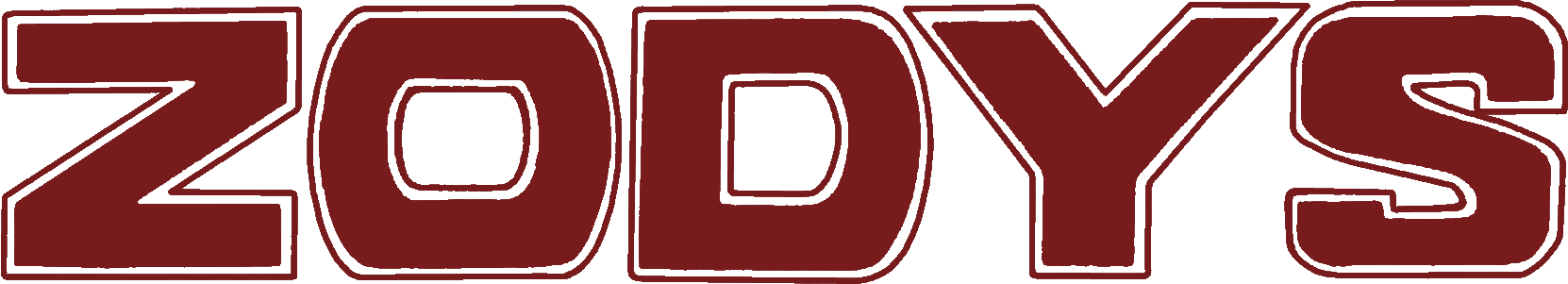
- Type: Subsidiary
- Industry: Department store, retail
- Founded: June 13, 1960; 66 years ago in Garden Grove, California
- Defunct: March 1986; 40 years ago
- Fate: Bankruptcy
- Headquarters: 2525 Military Avenue, Rancho Park, Los Angeles, California 90064 (1981)
- Area served: Arizona, California, Michigan, Nevada, New Mexico
- Products: Clothing, footwear, bedding, furniture, jewelry, beauty products, electronics and housewares
- Parent: Hartfield Stores/Hartfield-Zody's/HRT Industries

Hartfield-Zodys was an American retail corporation begun in 1960. It operated the Hartfield chain of women's ready-to-wear apparel in the Los Angeles area, and starting in 1960, the Zodys chain of discount retail stores (1960–1986), which operated locations in California, Arizona, Nevada, New Mexico, and Michigan.

== Hartfield's ==
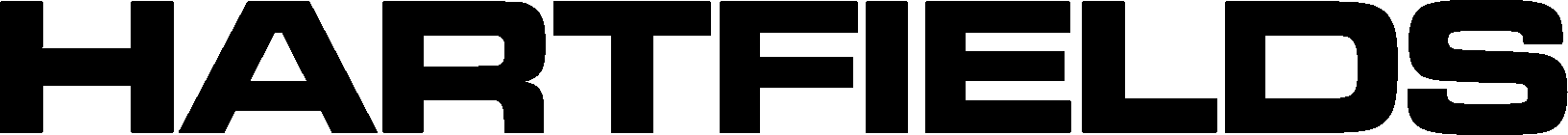
Hartfields logo

Zodys old logo

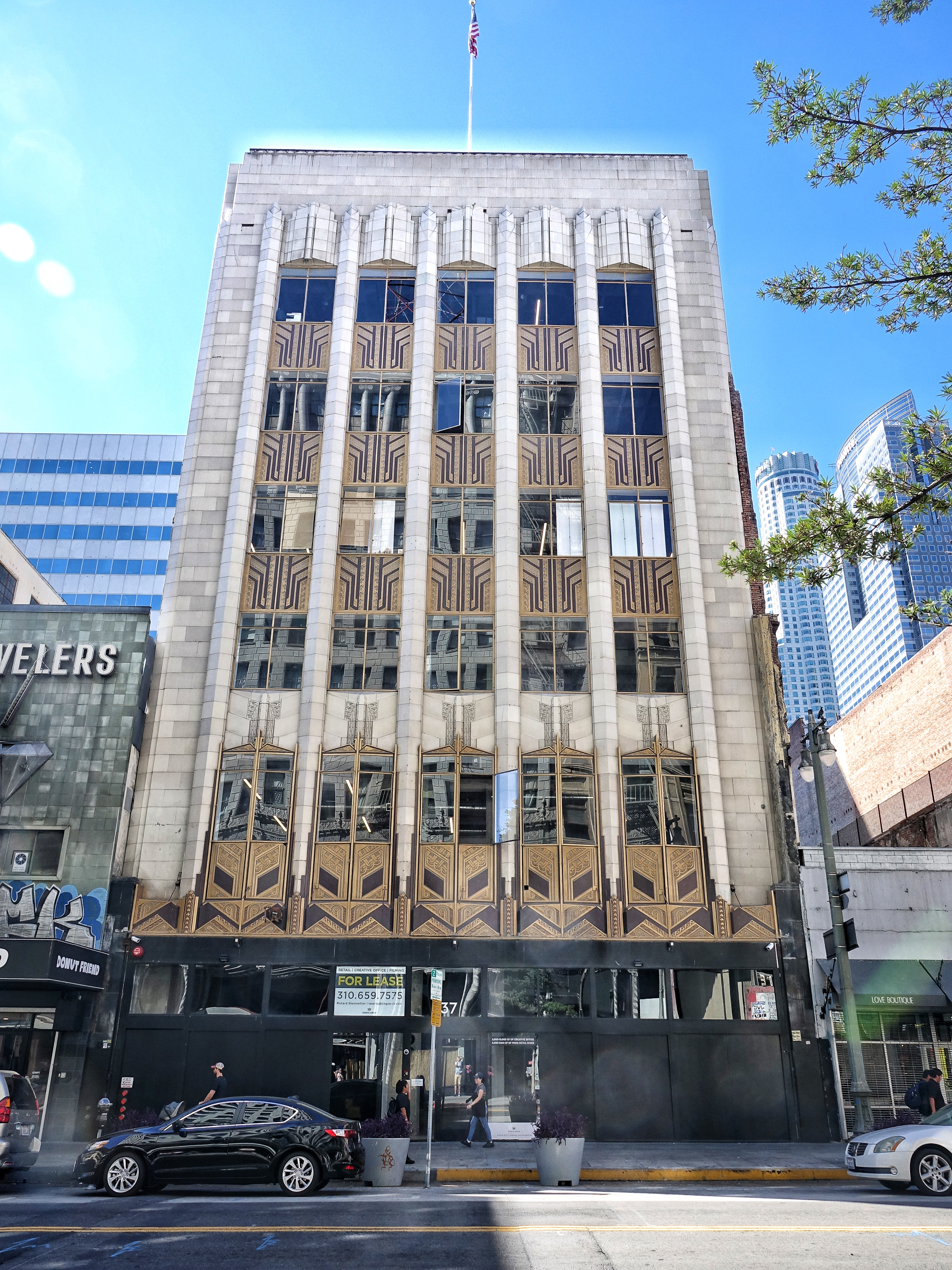
Hartfield’s Downtown Los Angeles location at 545 Broadway was a 1931 Art Deco building

Hartfield was present on Broadway, the main shopping district in the Los Angeles area in the 1940s, in the F. and W. Grand Silver Store Building at 545 S. Broadway and also at 749 S. Broadway. Additionally, a 1943 advertisement showed branches at 253 South Market Street in Inglewood, 650 Pacific Boulevard in Huntington Park, and 705 South Pacific Avenue in San Pedro (the latter opened 1941), all busy downtown shopping districts of what were once separate towns that had become working and middle class suburbs of Los Angeles. Additional branches opened across the Los Angeles area over the following decades.

== Zodys ==
Hartfield’s decided to enter the discount department store business with a new chain to be called Zodys, and opened its first one on June 13, 1960, in Garden Grove, in Central Orange County, California. From 1962 the parent company changed its name to Hartfield-Zodys. By 1969 there were 19 stores. In 1972, Hartfield-Zodys acquired the Yankee Stores chain of Flint, Michigan, briefly re-branding the stores as Yankee-Zodys, and later as Zodys. In 1969 Zodys opened a 6.5-acre distribution center employing 300. The Michigan stores were unprofitable, and were sold in 1974 when Hartfield-Zodys filed for Chapter 11 bankruptcy protection. A brief period of prosperity brought expansions into Arizona, Nevada and New Mexico. In 1979 there were 37 stores.

Locations included:

1. Garden Grove, 9852 Chapman Avenue (Opened 6/15/1960)
2. Redondo Beach, 1413 Hawthorne Boulevard (SR 107) (Opened 11/3/1960)
3. Long Beach, 5933 Spring Street (Opened 8/13/1961)
4. Northridge, 10201 Reseda Boulevard (Opened 10/27/1961)
5. Canoga Park, 8201 Topanga Canyon Boulevard (SR 27) (Opened 9/27/1962)
6. West Covina, 615 North Azusa Avenue (SR 39) (Opened 9/27/1962)
7. Burbank, 1000 North San Fernando Road (Opened 12/6/1962)
8. Anaheim, 120 West Orangethorpe Avenue (Opened 7/19/1967)
9. Huntington Beach, 6912 Edinger Avenue (Opened 8/10/1967)
10. Buena Park, 121 North Beach Blvd (SR 39) (Opened 11/19/1967)
11. Santa Ana, 1900 North Grand Avenue (Opened 10/20/1968)
12. Norwalk, 10901 East Imperial Highway (Opened 10/27/1968)
13. Fountain Valley, 16111 Harbor Boulevard (Opened 11/13/1968)
14. Long Beach, 2185 South Street (Opened 9/29/1968)
15. Pomona, 1444 East Holt Avenue (Opened 6/8/1969)
16. Inglewood, 3200 West Century Boulevard (Opened 8/17/1969)
17. North Hollywood, 12727 Sherman Way (Opened 10/19/1969)
18. Lynwood, 4050 Imperial Highway (Opened October 1969)
19. Fullerton, 120 East Imperial Highway (Opened 11/30/1969
20. El Monte, 4901 Santa Anita Drive (Opened 5/10/1970)
21. Torrance, 851 West Sepulveda Boulevard (Opened 6/21/1970)
22. Ladera Heights, 4925 West Slauson Avenue (Opened August 1970)
23. Bakersfield, 4001 Ming Street (Opened 9/9/1970)
24. Riverside, 3700 North Tyler Street (Opened October 1970)
25. Downtown Los Angeles, 437 South Broadway (Opened 3/21/1971)
26. Hollywood, 5420 West Sunset Boulevard (Opened 10/20/1971)
27. San Bernardino, 555 West Second Street (Opened 1972)
28. Alhambra, 600 East Valley Boulevard (Opened 9/9/1973)
29. Montebello, 2441 Via Campo (Opened 1974)
30. Fresno, 5422 North Blackstone Avenue (Opened 1974)
31. City Of Industry, 151 South Hacienda Boulevard (Opened 8/15/1977)
32. Pasadena, 900 North Lake Avenue (Opened 5/2/1978)
33. Indio, 82266 Highway 111 (Opened 9/30/1979)
34. Midtown, 4801 Venice Boulevard (Opened 10/15/1980)
35. Boyle Heights, 2800 East First Street (Opened 10/22/1980)
36. Vermont/Slauson, 5850 South Vermont Street, Los Angeles (Opened 11/20/81)
37. Oxnard, 830 Wagon Wheel Road
38. Oceanside, 2505 Vista Way
39. San Jose, 920 Blossom Hill
40. Sunnyvale, 121 El Camino Real
41. San Jose, 375 North Capital Avenue
42. Las Vegas, 2120 South Decatur Boulevard
43. Upland, 1445 East Foothill Boulevard (Opened 1982)
44. East Riverside, 3900 Chicago Avenue (Opened 1982)

== Liquidation ==
Bankrupt again by the early 1980s, the parent company, now known as HRT Industries, began closing stores in 1984. The remaining Zodys stores in California were shuttered in March 1986, with many locations sold to Federated Stores; the then-parent company of the Ralphs supermarket chain, and HomeClub, a home improvement store chain.
