= Hulett C. Merritt mansion =

Historic home in Pasadena, California

Coordinates: 34.1441°N 118.1596°W

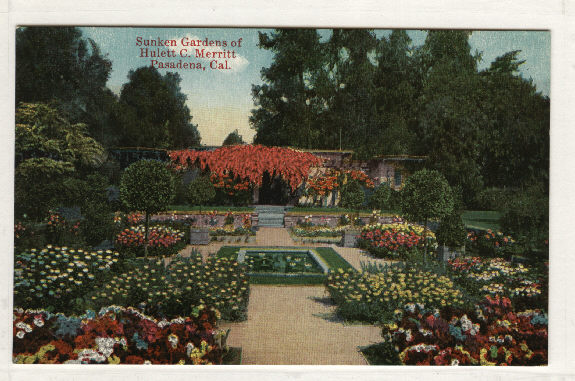
The Italian Garden at Villa Merritt

The Hulett C. Merritt mansion, also called the "Villa Merritt Ollivier", is a historical landmark residence located in Pasadena, California.

The Hulett Merritt estate "Villa Merritt Ollivier" in Pasadena was built on four acres for $1,100,000 in 1905 - 1908. His mansion was located at 99 Terrace Drive and bounded on the north by Olcott Place and on the west by South Orange Grove Avenue. This area on South Orange Grove Avenue was referred to locally as "Millionaires' Row" (per the City of Pasadena's Architectural and Historical Survey of 1997).

Hulett Merritt was the Chairman of US Steel and made his millions as an iron ore mining magnate.

It was featured in the opening scenes of The Millionaire, a popular TV series of the 1950s.

== Location ==
The mansion was located at 99 Terrace Drive and bounded on the north by Olcott Place and on the west by South Orange Grove Avenue. It was built on four acres for $1,100,000 in 1905-1908. This area was referred to locally as "Millionaires' Row".

The Merritt residence measures over 17,000 square feet, and includes seven bedrooms and three bathrooms.

== Ambassador College ==
In 1956, after Hulett's death, the property was purchased by Herbert W. Armstrong from Hulett's four surviving grandchildren because it was adjacent to Ambassador College. Villa Merritt Ollivier was renamed "Ambassador Hall" and the college subsequently obtained permission to close Terrace Drive. Thereafter, the residence and street address for the former Villa Merritt Ollivier was redesignated as 100 S. Orange Grove Blvd., Pasadena.

In 1966 Ambassador College built two Modernist classroom buildings flanking Ambassador Hall. A formal Italian sunken garden, with a plaza in the center, joined the three buildings and the garden into an academic center.

In 1997 Ambassador College closed. After many years of vacancy, the mansion and former classrooms were part of an event venue called the Ambassador Mansions & Gardens.

In the summer of 2015 the Merritt mansion and gardens were listed for sale as a private residence, and remained unsold as of November 2016. The two adjacent Modernist buildings with honeycomb concrete facades were demolished in 2013.
