= J. M. Hale =

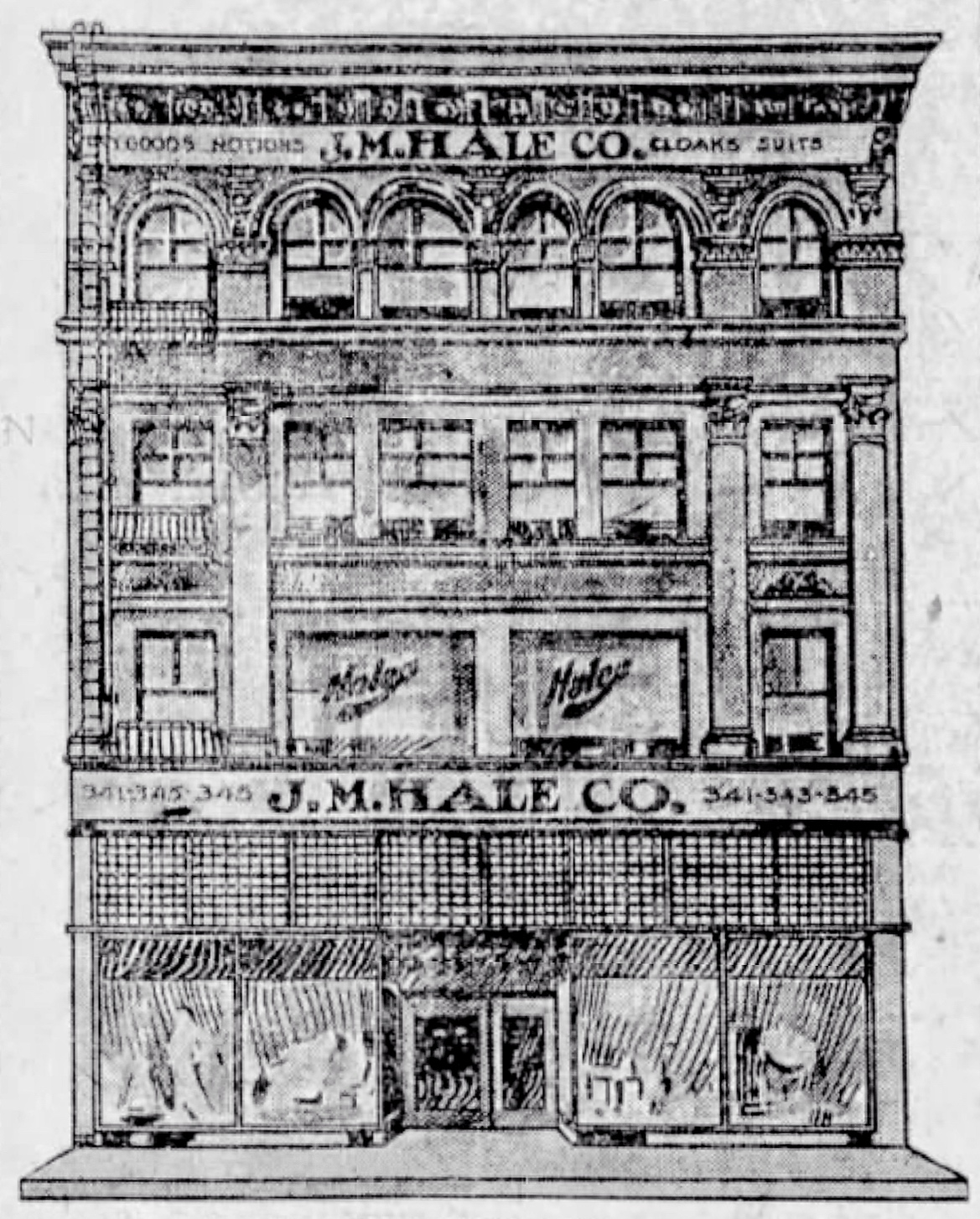
J. M. Hale Co.'s new store at 341–5 Broadway, 1908

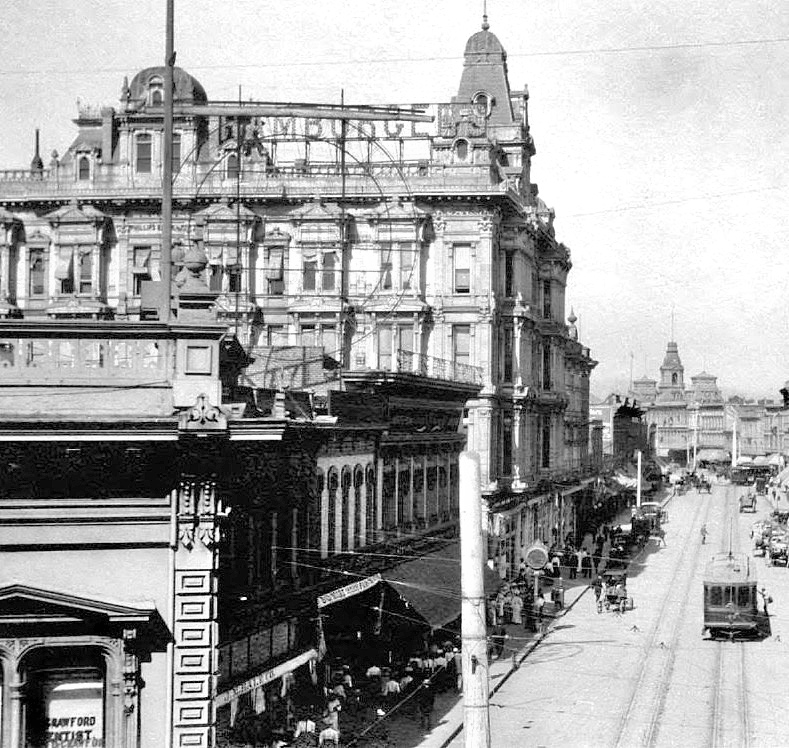
Spring Street, looking north from Temple, 1890s. In the bottom left corner, barely visible is the sign for J. M. Hale Co. at 107-9 (pre-1890: 7-9) Spring St. Hamburger's, the largest retail store in the West, dominates the photo.

J. M. Hale Co., also known as Hales, was a department store Downtown Los Angeles.

The Los Angeles Hale's was founded by James M. Hale (October 7, 1846, New York City–January 31, 1936, Los Angeles), one of the Hale brothers, whose brothers also founded the Hale Bros. stores in San Francisco, Oakland, Sacramento, San José, Salinas, Stockton and Petaluma, California. J. M. Hale, originally from New York City, worked with his brothers in Northern California and came to Los Angeles in 1883, opening his first store in October of that year. In the 1920s, sources state the San Francisco-based Hale Bros. company owned 30% of Los Angeles-based J. M. Hale Co., while in the 1890s the Los Angeles stores were advertised as "branches" of the San Francisco company.

== Spring Street stores ==
J. M. Hale opened his first store in October, 1883 at 7–9 Spring Street (post-1890 numbering: 107–109 N. Spring St.), in what was the Central Business District in the 1880s-1890s, now razed and the site of the Civic Center. In the 1890s, for a time, Hale's had two Los Angeles stores, both at 107–109-111 N. Spring Street and another one it bought from Frank, Grey & Co. in 1893, in the Hammer and Denker Block at the northwest corner of Third and Spring.

== Move to Broadway ==
At the end of January, 1909 Hale's moved from N. Spring St. to 341-345 South Broadway, an area then known as "Petticoat Lane", just south of Jacoby Bros. department store. Additional stores were opened in Ocean Park, Santa Monica, and elsewhere in Greater Los Angeles. In 1907 Hale’s acquired the stock of the Bon Marché department store.

== Hale residence ==
Until 1907 Hale lived in the 800 block of S. Grand Avenue. In 1907 Hale had built "a handsome home in the Wadsworth & Hollister Tract costing $7,434". The house is still standing at 149 Wadsworth St. in Ocean Park, Santa Monica, a very-late Queen Anne architecture/Shingle-style Victorian.
