= Yuba County Library =

Public library in Marysville, California, US

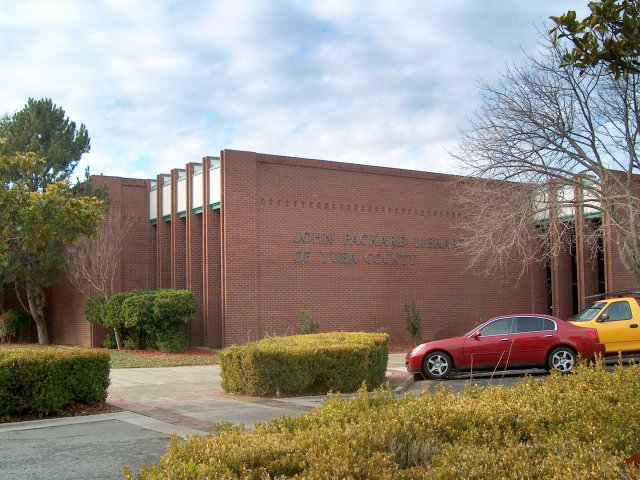
- Library in 2009
- 39°8′16″N 121°35′15″W
- Location: 303 Second Street; Marysville, California 95901, United States
- Established: 1855
- Service area: Yuba County, California
- Branches: 1

Collection
- Size: 118,505

Access and use
- Circulation: 106,632
- Population served: 81,575 (2020)

Other information
- Director: Loren McRory
- Website: Official website

The Yuba County Library is the main library, located in Marysville, California, for the people of Yuba County, California, United States. This library is operated by the Yuba County Library Service, part of the county government of Yuba County. Founded in 1855, as the Marysville Library, the current building opened in 1977 as the replacement for the Packard Library.

== History ==
Founded in 1855 as the "Marysville Library", the Yuba County Library is among the "oldest continuously operating public libraries west of the Mississippi." Marysville, recently found in 1851, was very much a frontier-town, and was called the "Gateway to the Gold Fields". In 1855, the Young Men's Literary and Scientific Association founded a library to gather reading materials and maintain them in a reading room where members of the association could use them. Initially, the library's collection was stocked with donations from the private collections of the association members. The first purchases made were made in New York and transported by sea.

In December 1858, the association donated its collection to the city of Marysville and a room in the city hall was converted into a library. Three years later, the collection moved to the newly built Masonic Hall, only to move back to the city hall ten years later.

In 1900, in response to the need for a larger space, Maryville pioneer and mining magnate John Q. Packard donated land at Fourth and C Streets and $70,000 to erect a new building. In the 1850s, Packard had been a charter member of the library. He hired San Francisco architect William Curlett as architect for what eventually became known as the Italianate and Beaux-Arts style Packard Library. The building was completed in March 1906 and opened to the public in October of that same year. There was a smoking room on the ground floor; the main reading room with the library's collection, administrative and work areas, and a children's area were on the first floor. The third floor held an auditorium. Overlooking the first floor was a mezzanine which was the location of the "Poppy Room".

The "Poppy Room" was used to house historic items (i.e. pioneer relics, photographs, diaries and manuscripts) of value to Yuba County. These items were transferred to the new Mary Aaron Museum in 1955. In 1972, the Yuba County Board of Supervisors created a county-wide library service, the Yuba County Library Service. The library of the City of Marysville, held at the Packard Library became the county library. After some deliberation it was determined that the needs of the community, and for cost reasons, it would be better to build a new building. This new building would be located at Second and C Streets. It opened in 1977 and is currently the one branch of the county library service.

== Current status ==
In 2019 a needs assessment report on the library was completed, which identified several modernization projects to be addressed over the coming years. While the county had been budgeting for a renovation project, the Yuba County Library was fortunate to receive a state grant in 2022 to make more significant improvements on the building.

While the library is undergoing its renovation, the main building on 303 Second Street is closed to the public. The library opened a temporary location in 2024 to house the materials available for checkout, to load bus passes, and offer computer use at the Yuba County Government Building: 915 8th Street, Suite 113 Marysville, CA 95901.

== See also ==
- Sutter County Library
