= Merchant's National Bank Building =

Building in Los Angeles, California

- Lloyd's Bank
- U.S. Historic district – Contributing property
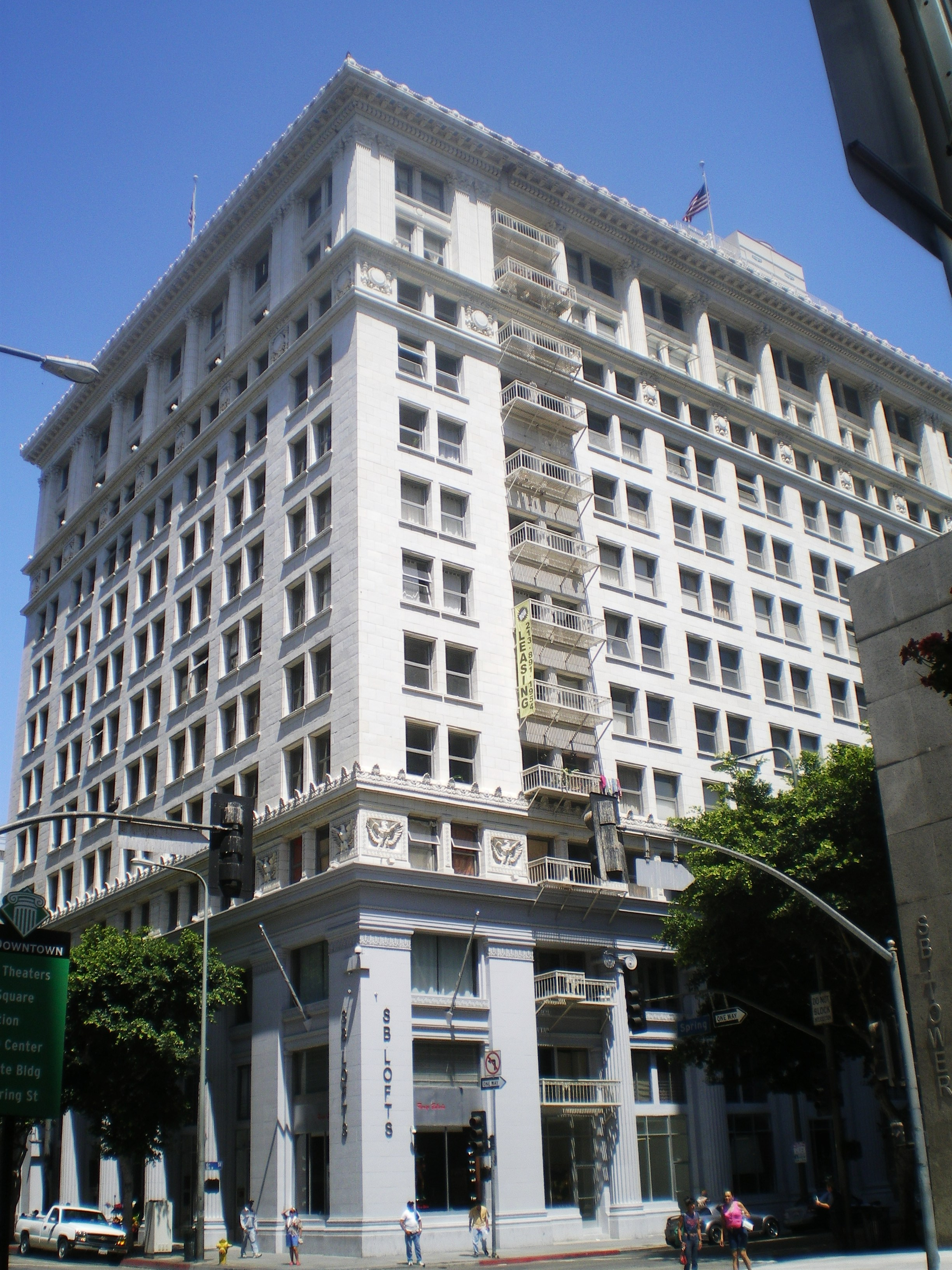
- The building in 2008

- Location within the Los Angeles metropolitan area
- Location: 548 S. Spring Street and 137 West 6th Street, Los Angeles, California
- Coordinates: 34.04585°N 118.25075°W
- Built: 1913
- Architect: William Curlett & Son
- Architectural style: Commercial Style/Beaux Arts
- Part of: Spring Street Financial District (ID79000489)
- Designated CP: August 10, 1979

Merchant's National Bank Building, also known as Farmers and Merchants Bank of Los Angeles, Lloyd's Bank, SB Lofts, and Marley Lofts, is a historic building located at 548 S. Spring Street and 137 West 6th Street, on the corner of 6th and Spring, in downtown Los Angeles, California. It is a contributing property in the National Register of Historic Places-listed Spring Street Financial District.

== History ==
Merchant's National Bank Building was designed by William Curlett & Son and built in 1913. The building housed a bank that was robbed in 1917. Other tenants over the years include the architecture film Lunden, Hayward & O'Connor, Los Angeles Homeless Services Authority, and Portland Cement Association.

In 1979, the Spring Street Financial District was added to the National Register of Historic Places, with Lloyd's Bank listed as a contributing property in the district.

The building was converted to residential in 2007. It contains 184 units. In 2022, the building was one of five downtown Los Angeles residential buildings bought by Laguna Point Properties for $402 million ($442 million in 2025). All five buildings were previously owned by DTLA Management.

== Architecture and design ==
Merchant's National Bank Building is a twelve-story fireproof steel-reinforced concrete and brick building faced with terra cotta, pressed brick, and stone. In United States Department of the Interior's Spring Street Historic District listing, this building is described as having a Commercial Style design, while the department's listing for the nearby Board of Trade Building mentions that this building has a Beaux Arts with Neo-classical detailing. Architecture historian Robert Winter and also describes this building's design as Beaux Arts.

The building's ground floor exterior features multiple entrance doors with proto-ionic columns between them and cornice above. The building also features Corinthian columns. The columns symmetrically divide the ground floor; additional two-story columns are located along the upper floors.

== See also ==
- List of contributing properties in the Spring Street Financial District
