= Chester Williams Building =

Building in Los Angeles, California

- U.S. Historic district – Contributing property
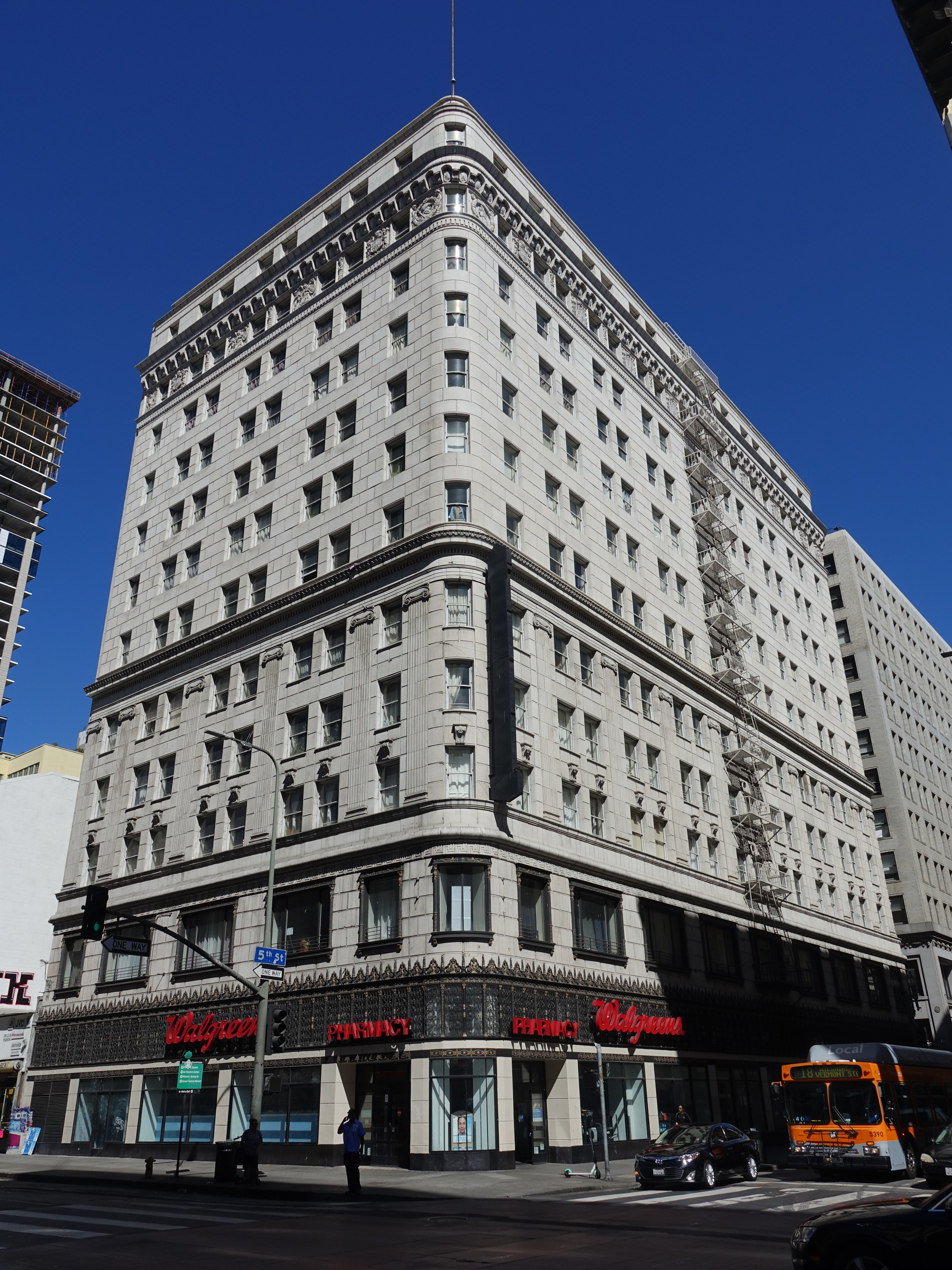
- The building in 2019

- Location within the Los Angeles metropolitan area
- Location: 452 S. Broadway and 215 W. 5th Street, Los Angeles, California
- Coordinates: 34°02′52″N 118°15′02″W
- Built: 1926
- Architect: Curlett & Beelman
- Architectural style: Beaux Arts
- Part of: Broadway Theater and Commercial District (ID79000484)
- Designated CP: May 9, 1979

Chester Williams Building is a historic twelve-story highrise located at 452 S. Broadway and 215 W. 5th Street in the Broadway Theater District in the historic core of downtown Los Angeles.

== History ==
Chester Williams Building, built in 1926, was designed by Curlett & Beelman, the architectural duo responsible for several buildings in the area, most notably the Eastern Columbia and Ninth and Broadway buildings.

In 1979, the Broadway Theater and Commercial District was added to the National Register of Historic Places, with Chester Williams Building listed as a contributing property in the district.

In 2012, Chester Williams Building was converted to an 88-unit apartment complex, at which point Broadway and 5th became the second historic core intersection with all four corners occupied by residential structures; the first was 6th and Spring.

== Architecture and design ==
Chester Williams Building features Beaux Arts architecture and is made of steel-framed concrete with a terra cotta facade meant to resemble cut stone. The building features wrought iron grillwork, ornamental bands, and a rounded corner.

== See also ==
- List of contributing properties in the Broadway Theater and Commercial District
