= Arts District station =

Arts District station may refer to:

- Little Tokyo/Arts District station, a Los Angeles Metro Rail station
- Pearl/Arts District station, a DART rail station
- Arts District/6th Street station, a proposed Los Angeles Metro Rail station
- Arts District station, a GRTC Pulse bus rapid transit station
