= Packard Library =

Historic library building in Marysville, California

- U.S. National Register of Historic Places
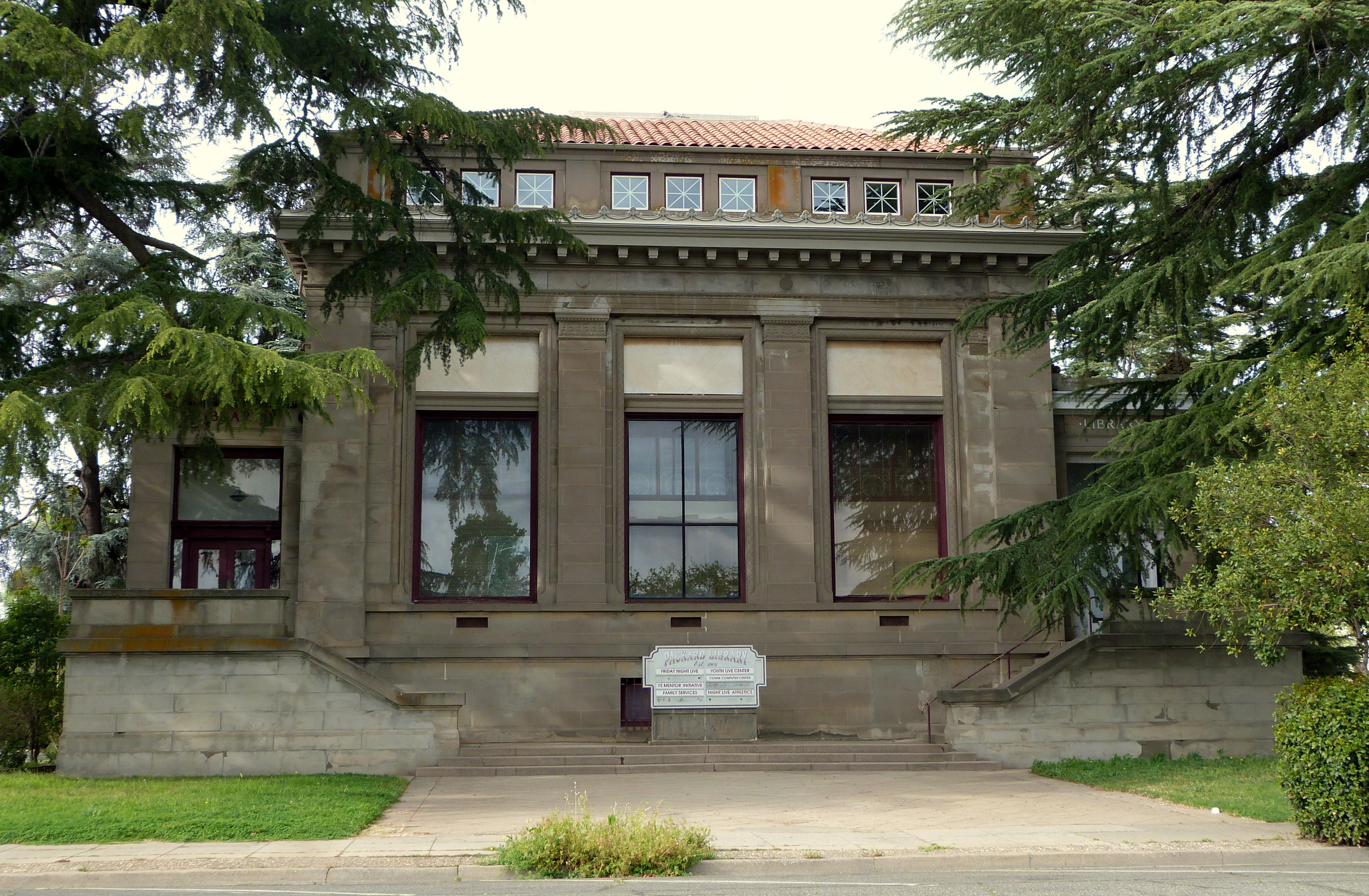
- The Packard Library in 2015

- Location within California Location within the United States
- Location: 301 4th Street; Marysville, California
- Coordinates: 39°08′23″N 121°35′16″W
- Area: 0.5 acres (0.20 ha)
- Built: 1905–1906
- Architect: Curlett, William
- Architectural style: Beaux-Arts, Italianate
- NRHP reference No.: 78000829
- Added to NRHP: December 18, 1978

The Packard Library is a historic library building located at 301 4th St. in Marysville, California. The library operated until 1977, when it was replaced by the new Yuba County Library. The library was added to the National Register of Historic Places on December 18, 1978.

== Background ==
Founded in 1855 as the "Marysville Library". Marysville, recently found in 1851, was very much a frontier-town, and was called the "Gateway to the Gold Fields." In 1855, the Young Men's Literary and Scientific Association founded a library to gather reading materials and maintain them in a reading room where members of the association could use them. Initially, the library's collection was stocked with donations from the private collections of the association members. The first purchases made were made in New York and transported by sea.

In December 1858, the association donated its collection to the city of Marysville and a room in the city hall was converted into a library. Three years later, the collection moved to the newly built Masonic Hall, only to move back to the city hall tens years later.

In 1900, in response to the need for a larger space, Maryville pioneer and mining magnate John Q. Packard donated land at Fourth and C Streets and $70,000 to erect a new building. In the 1850s, Packard had been a charter member of the library. He hired San Francisco architect William Curlett as architect for what eventually became known as the Italianate and Beaux-Arts style Packard Library. The building was completed in March 1906 and opened to the public in October of that same year. There was a smoking room on the ground floor; the main reading room with the library's collection, administrative and work areas, and a children's area were on the first floor. The third floor held an auditorium. Overlooking the first floor was a mezzanine which was the location of the "Poppy Room". The three-story building features verandahs on the east and west sides. The verandahs are supported by rectangular columns, and their roof lines are decorated with acanthus leaves.

The "Poppy Room" was used to house historic items (i.e. pioneer relics, photographs, diaries and manuscripts) of value to Yuba County. These items were transferred to the new Mary Aaron Museum in 1955. In 1972, the Yuba County Board of Supervisors created a county-wide library service, the Yuba County Library Service. The library of the City of Marysville, held at the Packard Library became the county library. After some deliberation it was determined that the needs of the community, and for cost reasons, it would be better to build a new building. This new building would be located at Second and C Streets. It opened in 1977 and is currently the one branch of the county library service.
