= Pacific Southwest Bank Building =

Building in Los Angeles, California

- Pacific Southwest Bank
- U.S. Historic district – Contributing property
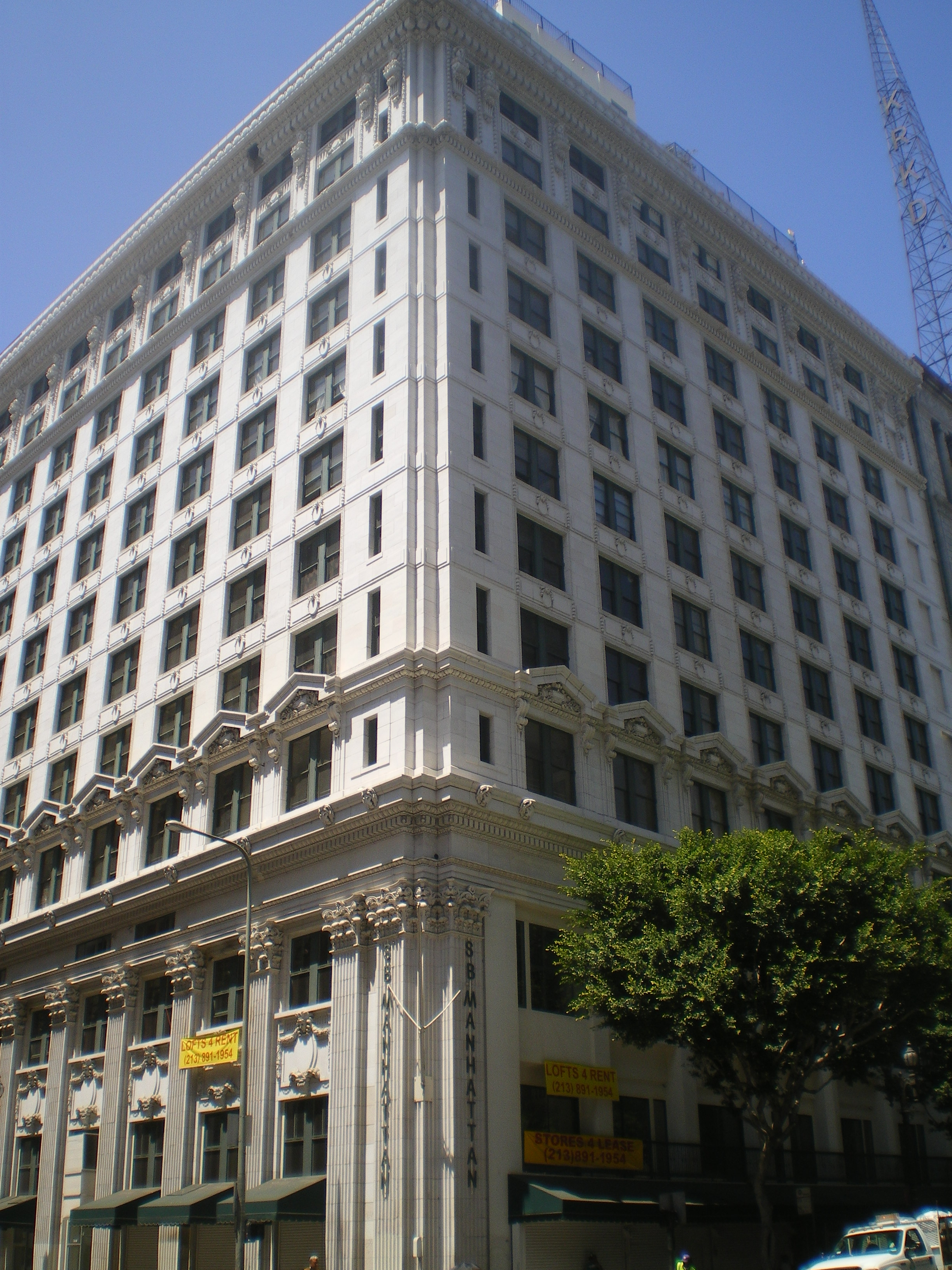
- The building in 2008

- Location within the Los Angeles metropolitan area
- Location: 561 S. Spring Street and 215 W. Sixth Street, Los Angeles, California
- Coordinates: 34.04636°N 118.25085°W
- Built: 1910
- Architect: Parkinson and Bergstrom
- Architectural style: Classical Style
- Part of: Spring Street Financial District (ID79000489)
- Designated CP: August 10, 1979

Pacific Southwest Bank, also known as Pacific Southwest Trust and Savings Bank, First National Trust & Savings Bank, SB Manhattan, and SB Manhattan Lofts, is a historic building located at 561 S. Spring Street and 215 W. Sixth Street, Los Angeles, California, on the corner of Spring and Sixth, in downtown Los Angeles, California. It is a contributing property in the Spring Street Financial District.

== History ==
The building that would become Pacific Southwest Bank building was designed by Parkinson and Bergstrom and built in 1910. The building was originally home to First National Trust & Savings Bank; the bank was headquartered in the building in 1921. The bank consolidated with and changed its name to Pacific Southwest Trust and Savings Bank, also known as Pacific Southwest Bank, in 1922. Security First National Bank occupied the building in the 1940s, 50s, 60s, and 70s. In 1967, Security First National Bank's headquarters were in the building.

In 1979, the Spring Street Financial District was added to the National Register of Historic Places, with Pacific Southwest Bank listed as a contributing property in the district.

In 2005, Barry Shy bought the building from Andrew Meieran for $13.5 million ($22.3 million in 2025). In 2007, the building reopened as residential with the name SB Manhattan. In 2011, city inspectors ordered part of the building evacuated after discovering life-threatening safety hazards. Inspectors also found additional violations on every floor of the building. Shy met with the inspectors, and post-meeting Shy was required to fix the building while inspectors determined that there was no imminent hazard, therefore an evacuation was not necessary.

Laguna Point Properties bought the building in 2022, then sold it to Fifteen Group the following year.

== Architecture and design ==
Pacific Southwest Bank building is eleven stories in height and made of reinforced concrete. The building features a Classical Style design that includes fluted columns, ornamental tile, and a terra cotta facade.

== See also ==
- List of contributing properties in the Spring Street Financial District
