= Heinsbergen Decorating Company Building =

Building in Los Angeles, California, U.S.

- U.S. National Register of Historic Places
- Los Angeles Historic-Cultural Monument
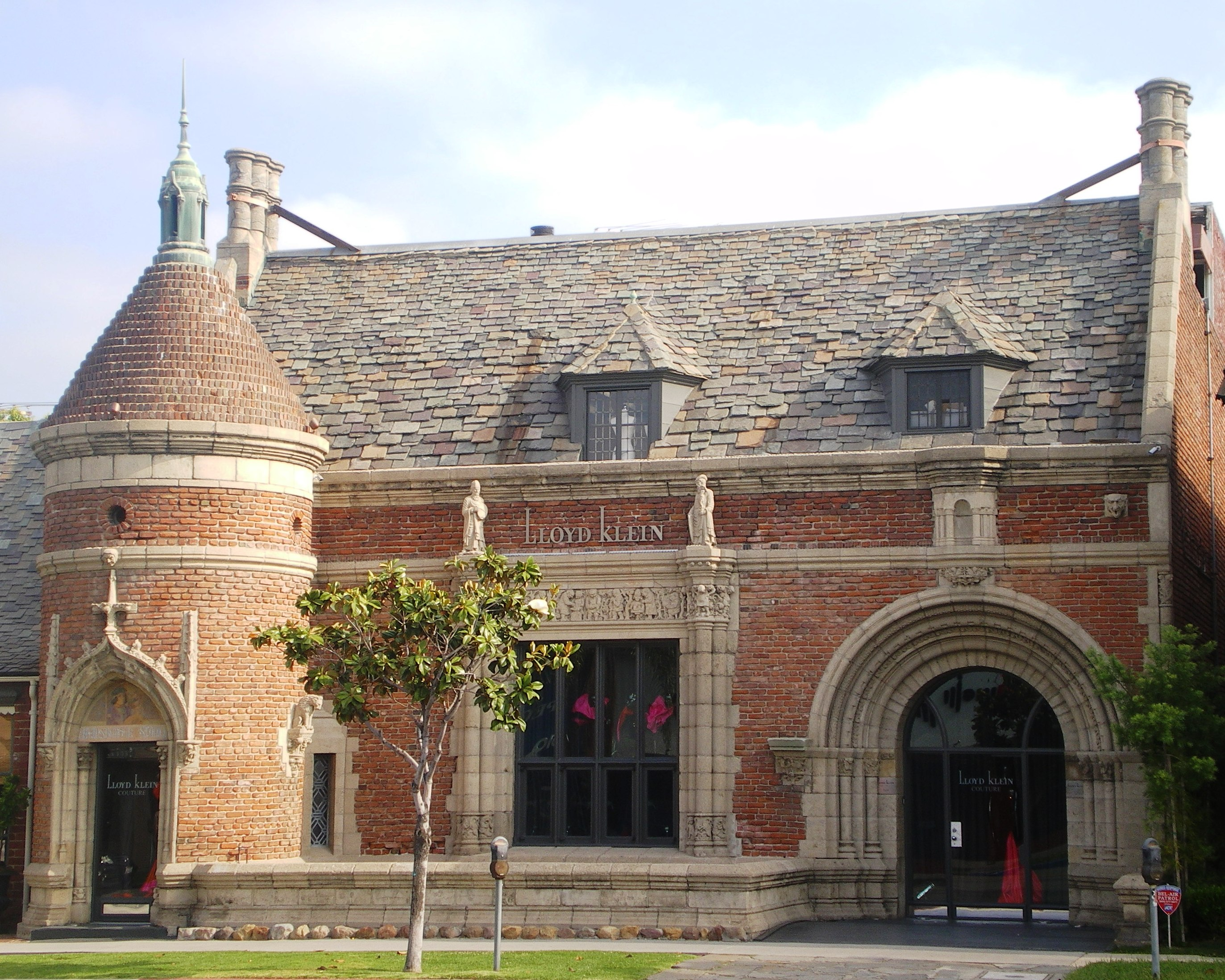
- Heinsbergen Decorating Company Building, 2008

- Location within the Los Angeles metropolitan area Location within California Location within the United States
- Location: 7415 Beverly Boulevard, Los Angeles, California 90036
- Coordinates: 34°4′35″N 118°21′3″W
- Built: 1928
- Architect: Curlett & Beelman
- Architectural style: Late Gothic Revival, Romanesque
- NRHP reference No.: 84000873
- LAHCM No.: 275

Significant dates
- Added to NRHP: September 20, 1984
- Designated LAHCM: 1984-01-14

The Heinsbergen Decorating Company Building, also known as the AT Heinsbergen & Company Building, is a historic building on Beverly Boulevard in Los Angeles, California, United States. It was listed on the National Register of Historic Places in 1984.

== Architecture ==
The castle-like building was built in 1928 for noted muralist Anthony Heinsbergen (1894-1981), and designed by Curlett & Beelman in a Late Gothic Revival and Romanesque style. The building's notable features include the prominent cylindrical tower, a Renaissance-style mural in the tower arch, and the detailed friezes displaying artisans at work. At least 11 buildings designed by architect Claud Beelman have been listed on the National Register. The building was constructed while Heinsbergen was employed to create murals for Los Angeles City Hall, and he had his building on Beverly Boulevard built using bricks from the old city hall.

== History ==
The building served as the office for Heinsbergen's mural-painting business for more than 50 years. Heinsbergen's company, called Heinsbergen Decorating Company or A.T. Heinsbergen & Company, employed 185 artist painters, and created murals for movie palaces and many important buildings, including the U.S. Department of Commerce Building in Washington, D.C., the Witkin Library & Courts Building in Sacramento, and the Sir Francis Drake Hotel in San Francisco. In Los Angeles, Heinsbergen's murals can still be seen at the Hollywood Roosevelt Hotel, the Beverly-Wilshire Hotel, Los Angeles City Hall, the Wiltern Theatre, the ceiling of El Portal de La Paz Mausoleum at Rose Hills Memorial Park in Whittier and the Park Plaza Hotel.

After Heinsbergen died, his children continued to operate the business at the Beverly Boulevard building, in many cases working to restore murals that their father had designed decades earlier.

The Heinsbergen Building was listed on the National Register of Historic Places in 1984.

The building was later converted to retail space and was occupied by "Lloyd Klein Couture", the West Coast store for New York fashion designer Lloyd Klein. Klein's customers include Nicole Kidman, Renée Zellweger, Gwen Stefani and Kate Beckinsale. Though Klein's name was prominently featured on the building, the name "Heinsbergen Decorating" is still seen above the door at the base of the tower.

After 12 years at the Beverly Hills location on Robertson, fashion designer Claire Pettibone's Flagship Salon has moved and now occupies the Heinsbergen Building and is officially open as of July 10, 2013.

== Gallery ==
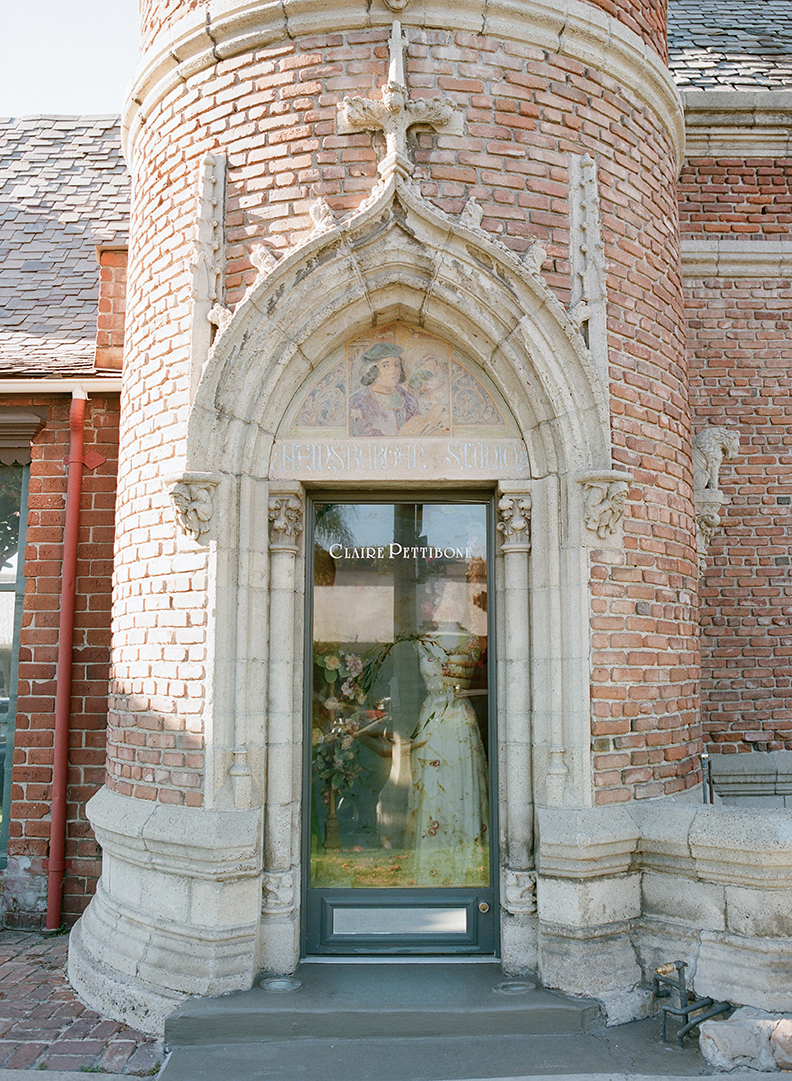
Entrance

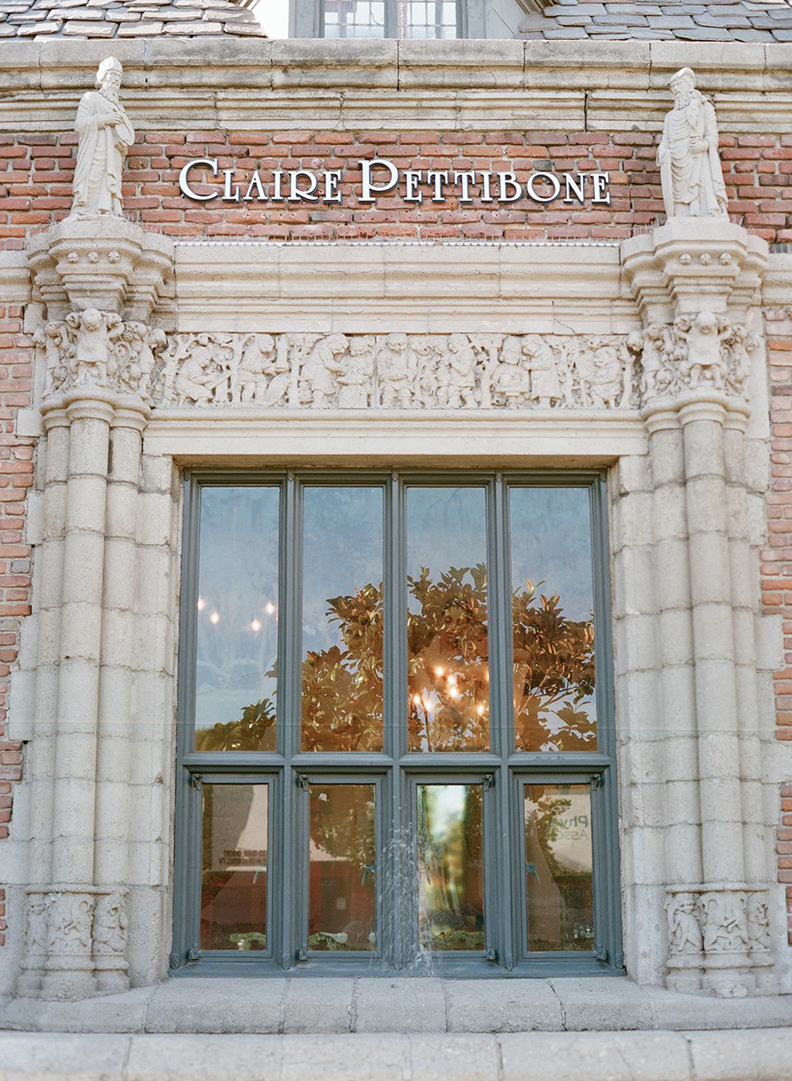
Frieze and detailing

== See also ==
- National Register of Historic Places listings in Los Angeles
- List of Los Angeles Historic-Cultural Monuments in the Wilshire and Westlake areas
