= Theodore F. Payne House =

- U.S. National Register of Historic Places
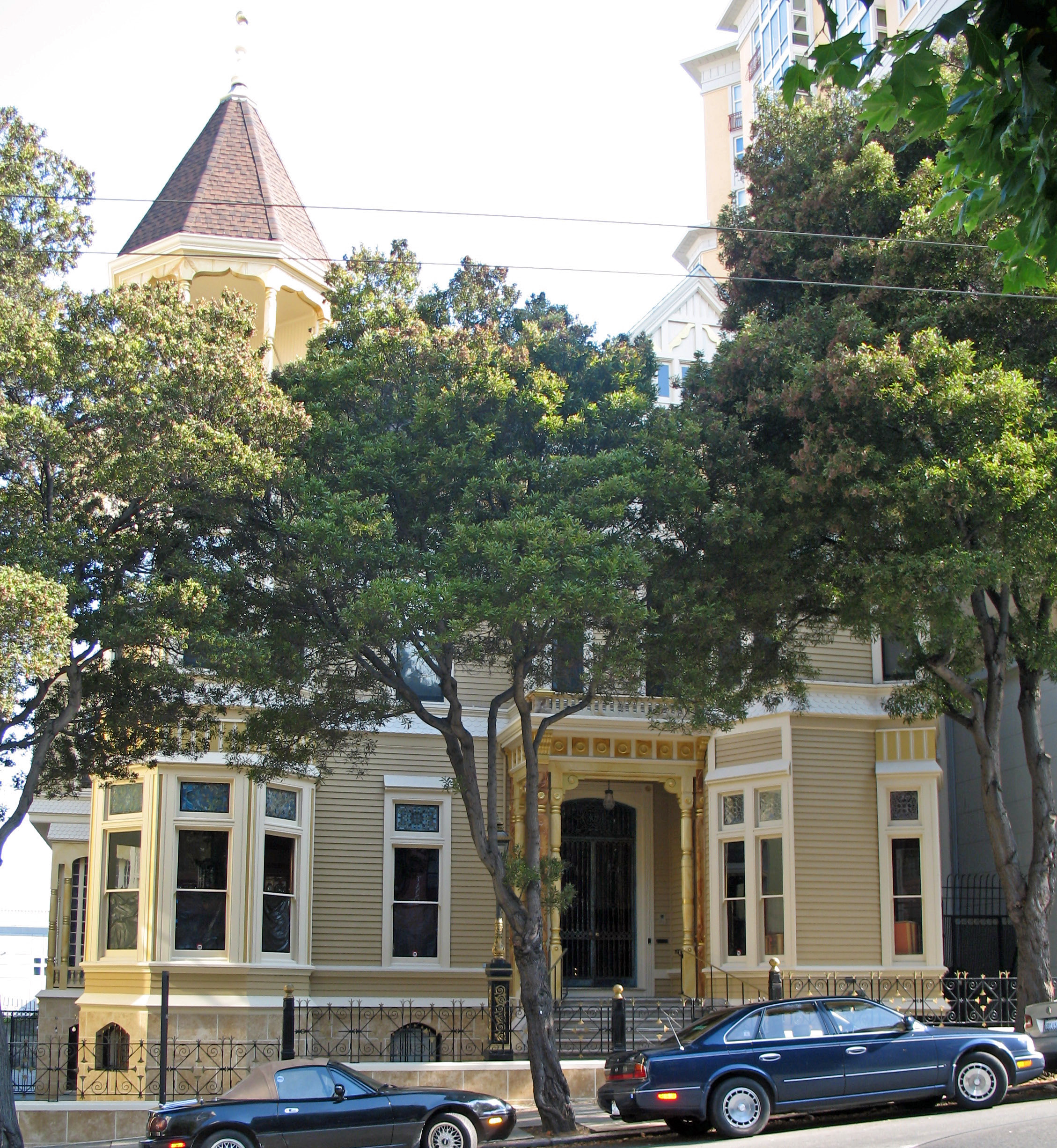

- Location within San Francisco County Location within California
- Location: 1409 Sutter St., San Francisco, California
- Coordinates: 37°47′14″N 122°25′26″W
- Built: 1881
- Architect: William F. Curlett
- Architectural style: Stick style / Eastlake; Queen Anne
- NRHP reference No.: 80000847
- Added to NRHP: June 11, 1980

The Theodore F. Payne House, also known as the Payne Mansion, is a Victorian house in the Lower Pacific Heights neighborhood of San Francisco, California, United States. Built in 1881 and designed by William Curlett in a mix of Stick, Eastlake, and Queen Anne styles, it survived the 1906 San Francisco earthquake and was listed on the National Register of Historic Places in 1980. It has been adapted to house a hotel and a restaurant.

== House ==
The Theodore Payne House was designed by William Curlett and his brother-in-law Theodore Eisen in a blended Victorian style, with Stick, Eastlake, and Queen Anne elements. It is the last of several mansions along its section of Sutter Street, and one of the few surviving upper-class houses from before the 1906 earthquake and the ensuing fire. It was built with modern conveniences including heating, hot and cold running water, and indoor toilets, and had a porte cochère (now removed), many bay windows, and an open octagonal candle-snuffer turret. The interiors include Tiffany stained-glass windows.

== History ==
The mansion was built in 1881 for Theodore Fryatt Payne, whose father, also called Theodore Payne, had become wealthy in the Gold Rush and who made his own fortune manufacturing nuts and bolts, and his wife Mary Pauline O'Brien, who inherited the largest share of her uncle William S. O'Brien's silver fortune from the Comstock Lode. A March 1882 article in a builders' magazine projected the cost of construction at $16,500; both the lot and the building contract were in Mrs. Payne's name.

The Paynes moved out of the city after the 1906 earthquake to Menlo Park, where they had a house built out of reinforced concrete; Theodore Payne died in 1907 and his widow sold the San Francisco house in approximately 1909, after which it was owned by Edgar and Ida Anderson and by 1933 had become a Japanese YMCA. In about 1940 it became Karl Lengfeld's antiques store, a use that continued into the late 1960s and involved some alterations to the interior. It has also been the headquarters of the San Francisco Medical Society and an alcoholism treatment center; in the 1990s it was available for rent as a wedding venue. Its exterior having been little altered, it was listed on the National Register of Historic Places in 1980.

In 2011 it was purchased by Jing Yao and her husband, Chinese hotel entrepreneurs who converted it into their first venture in the United States, a ten-room hotel oriented toward Chinese business travelers called Leader House. Leader House and a Chinese restaurant on two floors within the building received the necessary city permissions in late 2013 but never opened; instead it was operated as the Payne Mansion Hotel, the most expensive Airbnb rental in San Francisco at $10,000 a night for the entire building. It was bought in 2018 by Bernard Rosenson, a Southern California hotelier, and late that year the Mansion on Sutter hotel opened there, with a French restaurant named 1881.
