= Mutual Savings Bank Building =

Historic bank building in California, U.S.

- U.S. National Register of Historic Places
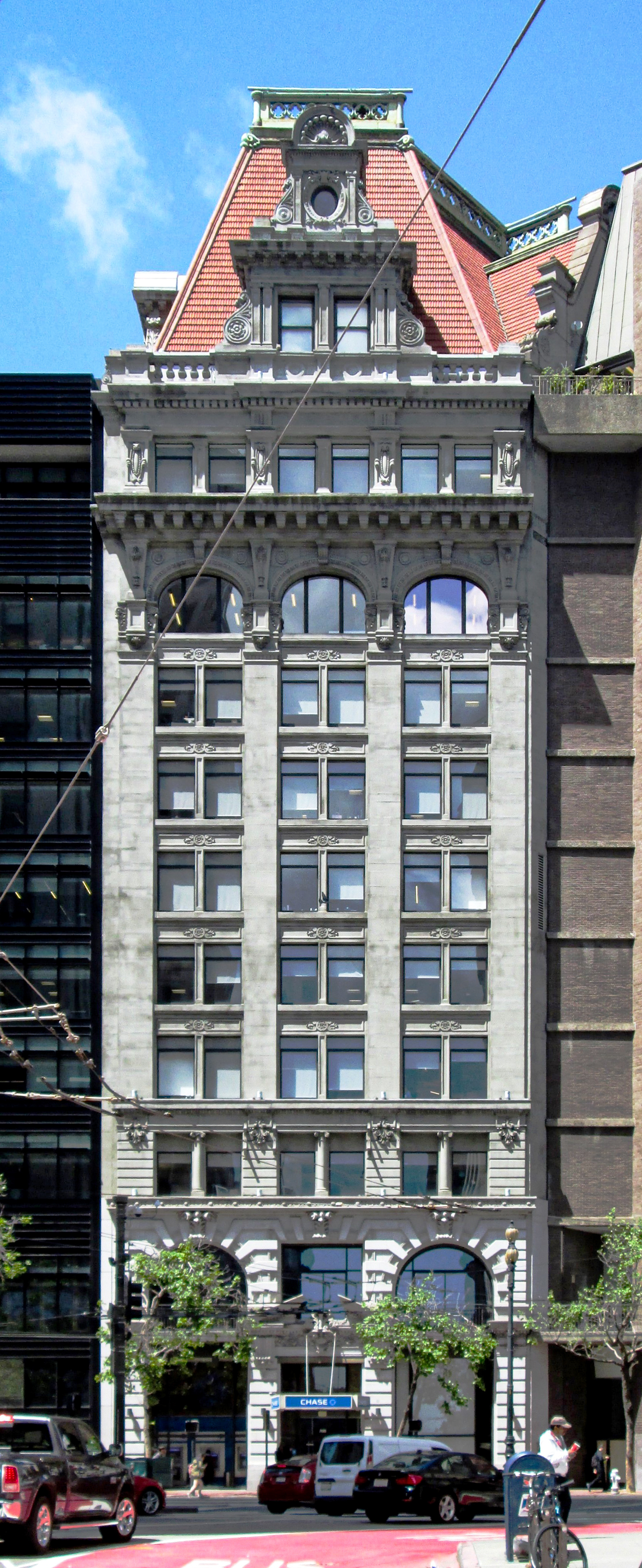
- Mutual Savings Bank Building (1902 part) at 700 Market Street, San Francisco.

- Location within San Francisco County Location within California Location within the United States
- Location: 700 Market Street at the corner of Geary and Kearny Streets, San Francisco, California
- Coordinates: 37°47′15.7″N 122°24′13.5″W
- Area: less than one acre
- Built: 1902
- Architect: William F. Curlett
- Architectural style: French Renaissance Revival
- NRHP reference No.: 13001107
- Added to NRHP: January 22, 2014

The Mutual Savings Bank Building is a building located at 700 Market Street on the corner of Kearny, Market, and Geary Streets in the Financial District in San Francisco, California. It was built in 1902 and was designed by architect William F. Curlett in the French Renaissance Revival style. The 12-story building was one of San Francisco's earliest skyscrapers. The building was added to the National Register of Historic Places on January 22, 2014.

== History ==
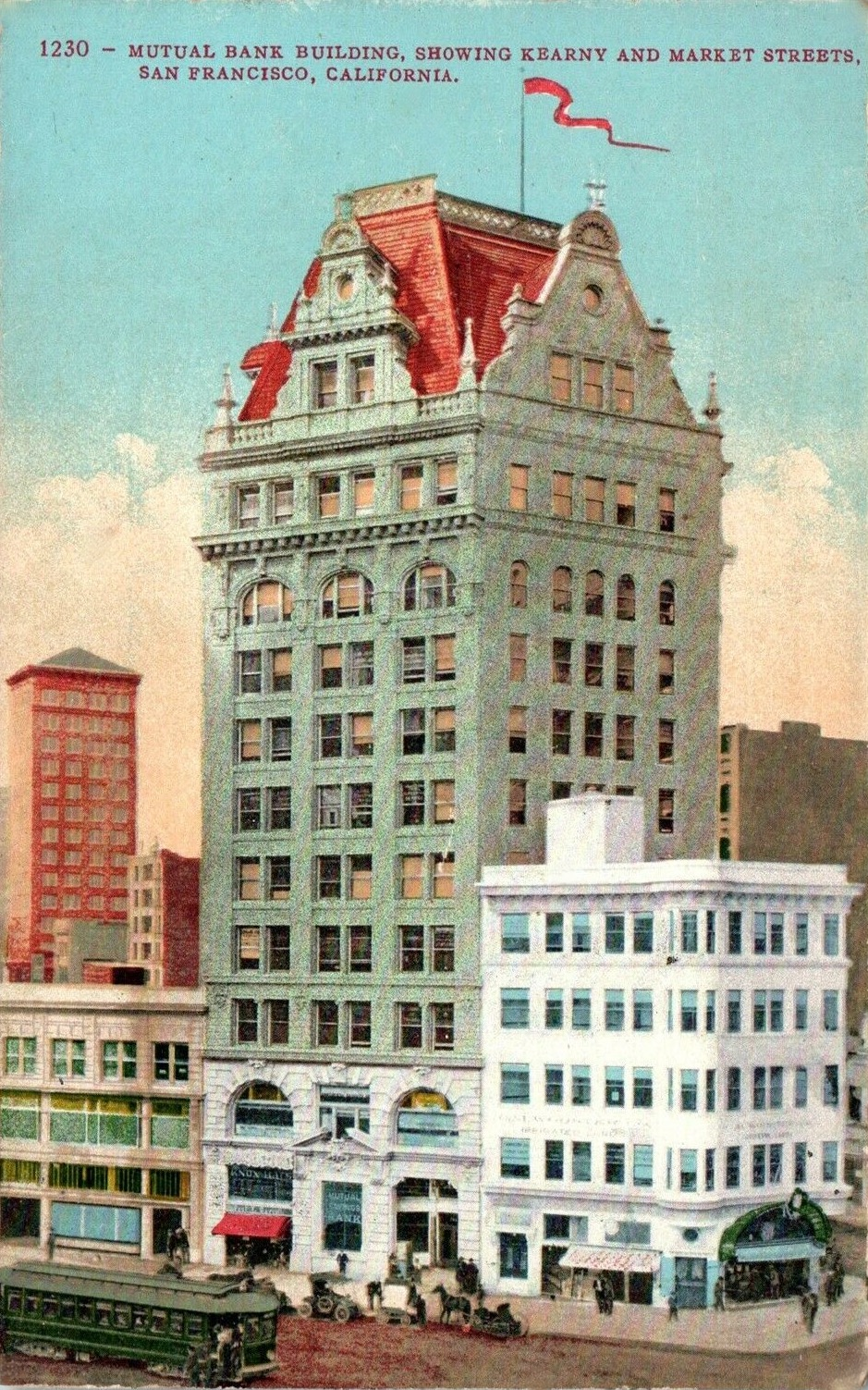
1911 Post Card of the Mutual Bank Building and the H. P. Flannery Building.

The Mutual Savings Bank was founded in 1889 by James Phelan, James D. Phelan, James G. Fair, James K. Moffitt, and other directors. In 1900, the bank commissioned architect William F. Curlett to design a building for the prominent corner of Market and Kearny Streets. It was completed in 1902 as the third largest building in San Francisco with 12-stories. The Mahony Bros. supervised the construction, which has a steel framework throughout, two stories of Raymond granite, and ten stories of Colusa sandstone, limestone and terracotta with a mansard roof.

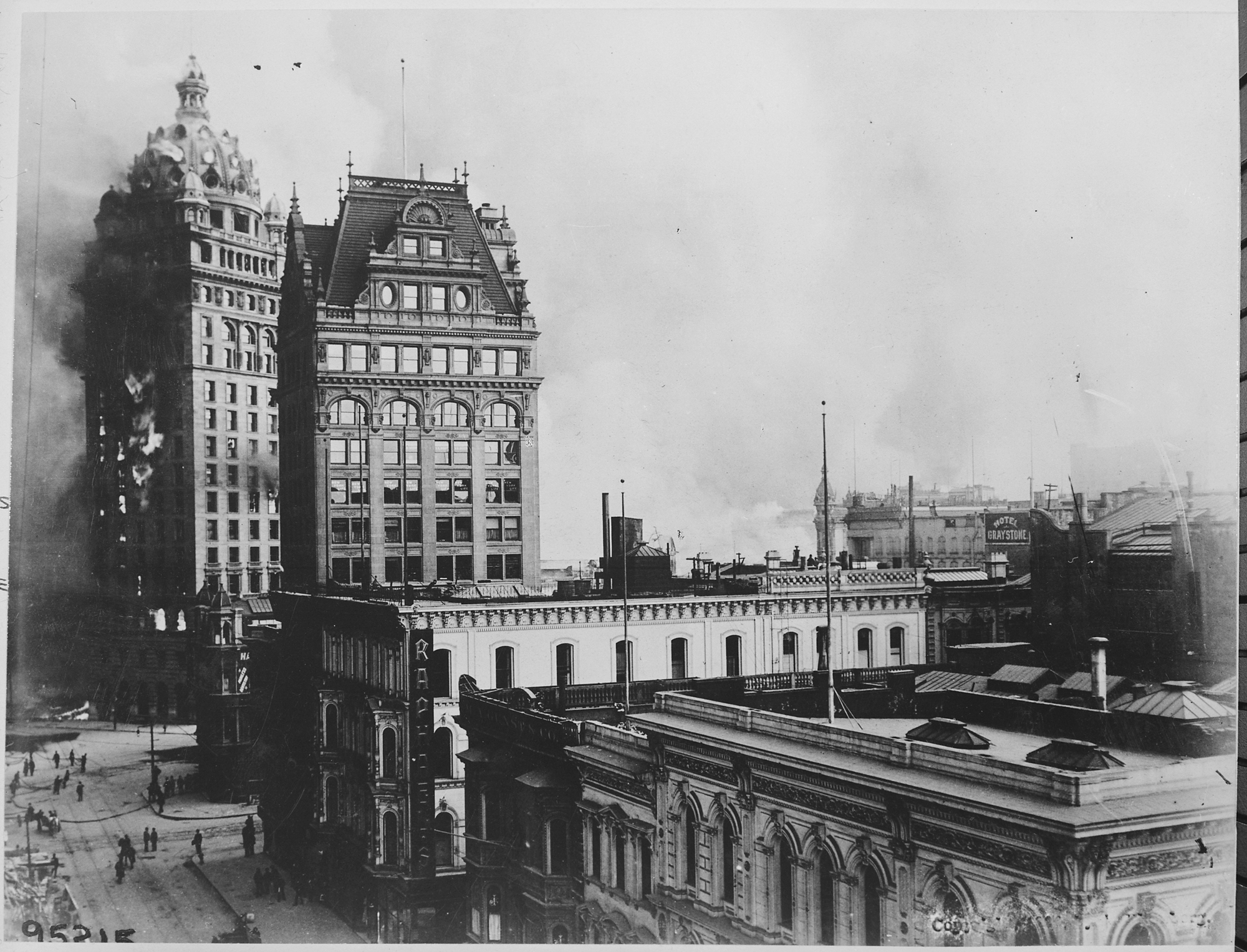
1906 San Francisco earthquake showing the Call Building and the Mutual Savings Bank building.

The building survived the 1906 San Francisco earthquake and suffered only moderate damage. The repair was supervised by William Curlett.

The Mutual Savings Bank building was sold to the First Federal Trust Company, a subsidiary of the First Federal National Bank, in 1919. The building was then sold to the Esberg family in October 1919. Later that year the property was purchased by real-estate mogul George Whittell Sr., founder of the Whittell Reality Company. The building was owned and managed for the next fifty years by the Whittell Reality Co.

In 1961, the Citizens' Savings & Loan Association purchased the Mutual Savings Bank Building and the neighboring Flannery Building.

== Preservation ==
In 1964, Charles W. Moore was hired as the lead architect to build a 12-story reinforced-concrete annex in the Modern or early Postmodern style. Moore convinced the bankers to retain the old Mutual Savings Bank Building and construct an addition on the site of the old five-story H. P. Flannery Building. This decision was unusual during the height of High Corporate Modernism when older skyscrapers in San Francisco were being torn down and replaced.

In 2013, a ten-story addition was designed by Charles F. Bloszies to retain the 1902 building's historic integrity. The design complied with the Secretary of the Interior's Standards for Rehabilitation. The addition is left of the Mutual Savings Bank building. The structure of the new building is classical, with metal fins that project out as sunscreens above the windows on the south-facing elevation. The roof terrace of the new addition has a privately owned public space (POPOS), with a rooftop garden and views of the city.

The Mutual Savings Bank Building was added to the National Register of Historic Places in 2014.

== See also ==
- National Register of Historic Places listings in San Francisco
