= Claire Pettibone =

American fashion designer

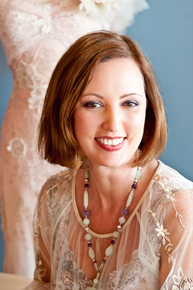
- Pettibone in 2012 at the Claire Pettibone Flagship Salon in Beverly Hills.
- Born: May 23, 1967 (age 58); Los Angeles, California, U.S.
- Education: Otis Parsons School of Design
- Occupation: Fashion designer
- Labels: Claire Pettibone Couture Bridal, Claire Pettibone Luxury Lingerie, Bleu Clair, Butterflies by Claire Pettibone, Claire Pettibone Heirloom
- Awards: CILA's best luxury lingerie, 2006; best bridal lingerie, 2007

Claire Pettibone (born May 23, 1967) is an American fashion designer, known for her couture wedding gowns.

== Life and career ==
Pettibone was born on May 23, 1967, in Los Angeles, California, United States. In 1993, Pettibone partnered with her husband, Guy Toley, to form the brand "body & soul". Their debut lingerie collection was carried in Nordstrom stores nationwide. Pettibone's collections have also been carried by Neiman Marcus, Saks Fifth Avenue, among other stores.

In 2005, Pettibone launched a couture Bridal Gown collection that appeared on the cover of Women's Wear Daily. In 2012, a gown designed by Pettibone was worn by Priscilla Chan at her wedding to Mark Zuckerberg. Shortly afterwards, Una Healy of the girl group The Saturdays wore one of Pettibone's dresses at her wedding.

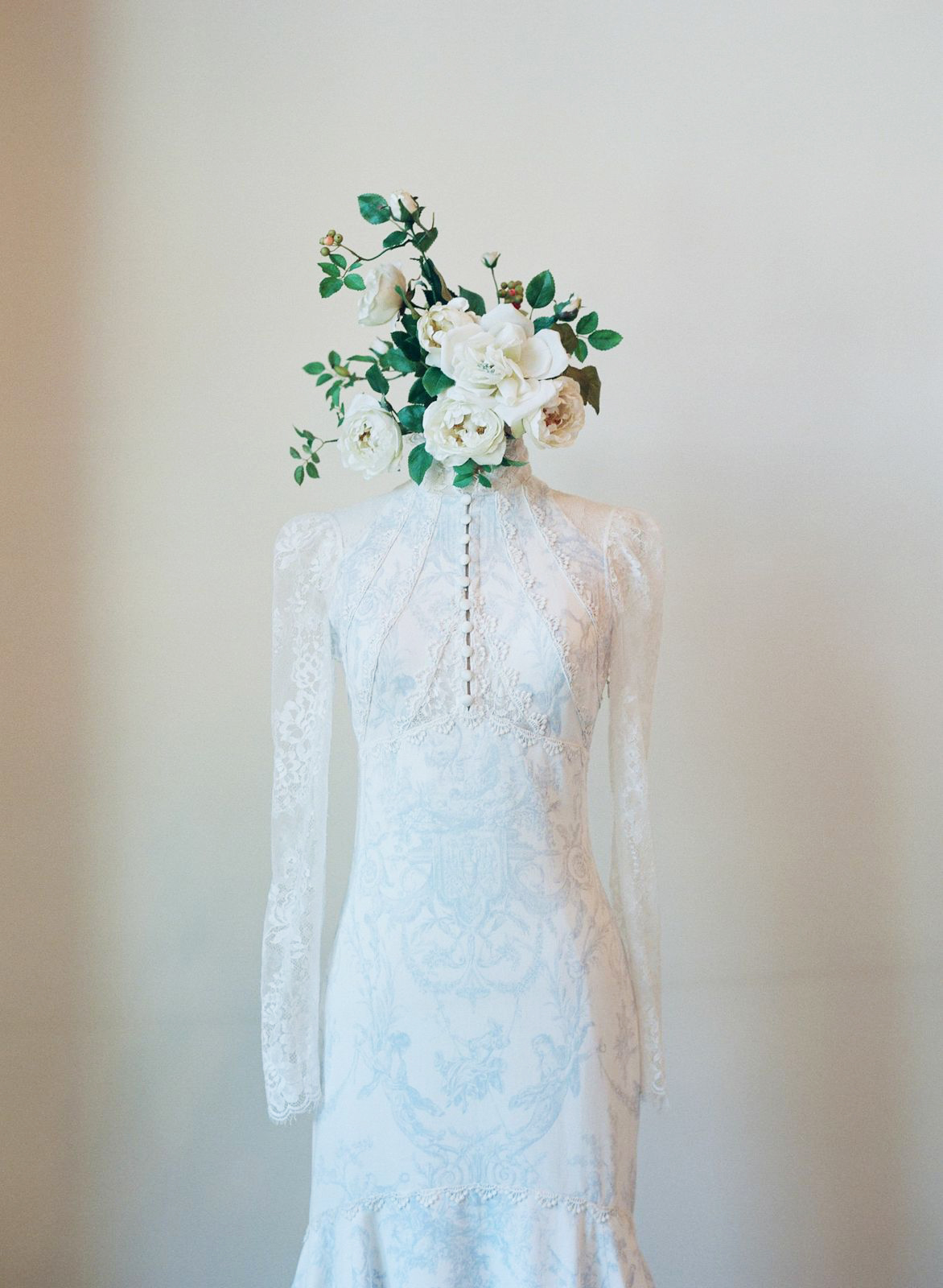
Toile Francais gown designed by Claire Pettibone

== Retail ==
In 2001, the Claire Pettibone Flagship Salon opened in Beverly Hills. Pettibone began designing wedding and red carpet gowns for clients including Cameron Diaz, Courteney Cox Arquette, Leona Lewis, Elisabeth Moss, Katie Melua, Jennie Garth, Nikki Reed and Missi Pyle.

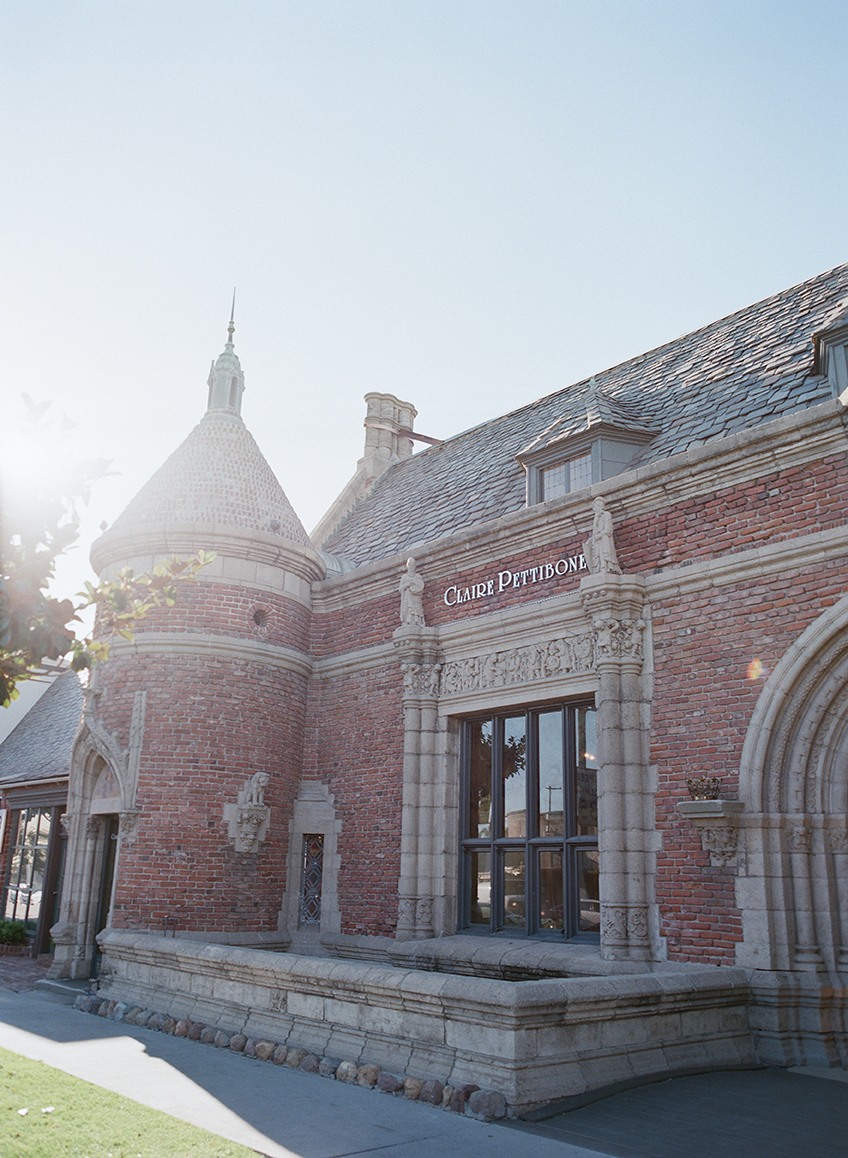
Claire Pettibone Flagship Salon in 2013.

After 12 years in Beverly Hills, the store moved to the Heinsbergen Building on Beverly Boulevard in 2013.
