= Norton Building (Los Angeles) =

Building in Los Angeles, California

- U.S. Historic district – Contributing property
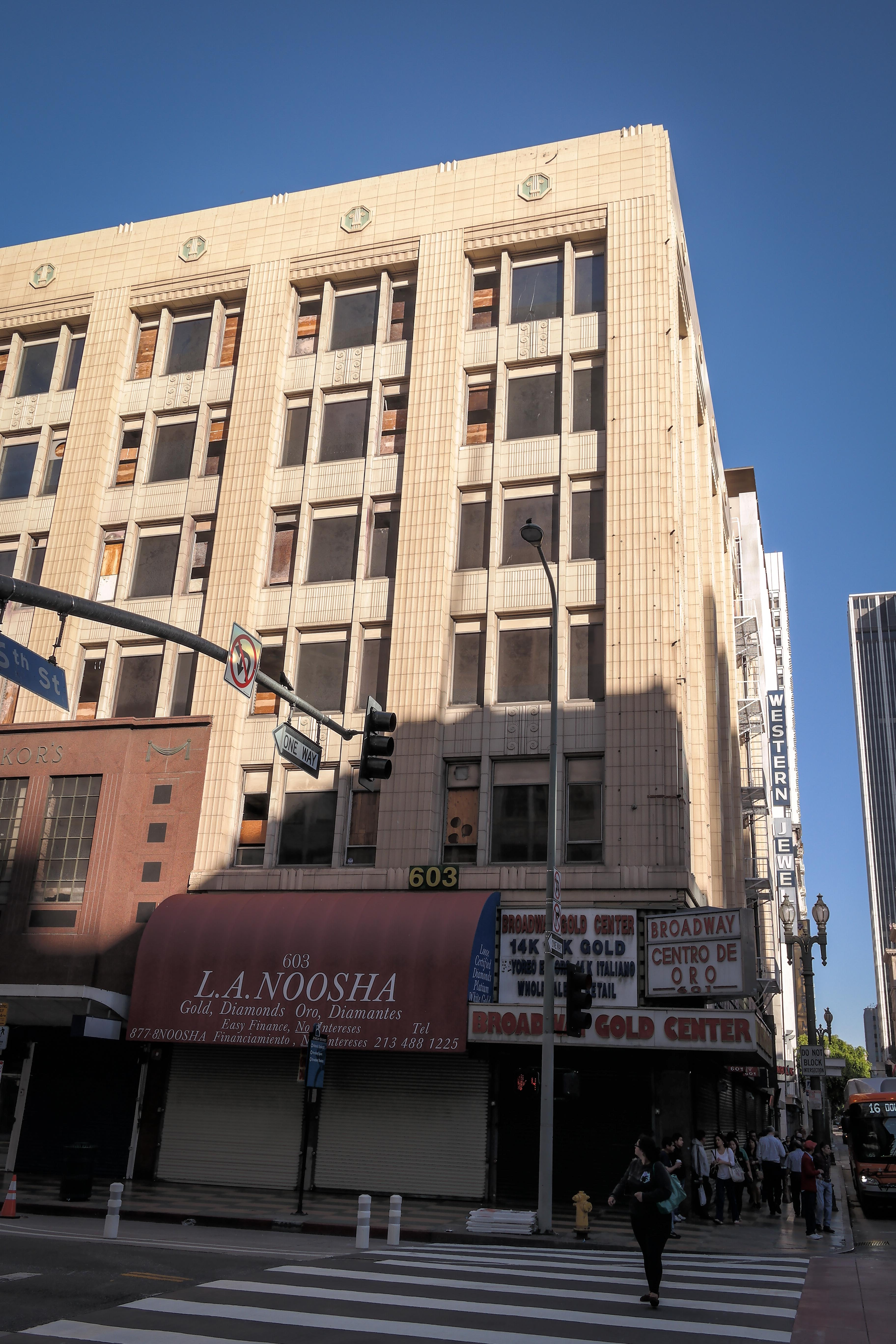
- The building in 2014

- Location within the Los Angeles metropolitan area
- Location: 601-605 S. Broadway and 312 W. 6th Street, Los Angeles, California
- Coordinates: 34°02′49″N 118°15′09″W
- Built: 1906
- Architect: Parkinson and Bergstrom
- Part of: Broadway Theater and Commercial District (ID79000484)
- Designated CP: May 9, 1979

Norton Building, also known as Zukors and H. Jeyne Company Building, is a historic six story building located at 601-605 S. Broadway and 312 W. 6th Street in the Jewelry District and Broadway Theater District in the historic core of downtown Los Angeles.

== History ==
Norton Building was designed by Parkinson and Bergstrom and built by John H. Norton in 1906. It was designed for heavy goods and was occupied by the H. Jeyne Company.

The building caught fire in 1935, after an acetylene tank used for exterior remodeling exploded, blowing out windows and injuring dozens. In 1940, the building facade, which had been blackened by the fire, was completely altered, but the new design complimented the time period and blended well with the rest of the district.

In 1979, the Broadway Theater and Commercial District was added to the National Register of Historic Places, with Norton Building listed as a contributing property in the district.

In 2017, the building's upper floors were converted to housing, while the ground floor remained retail.

== Architecture and design ==
Norton Building features a steel frame and was built with brick and concrete, making it the strongest building in Los Angeles, size considered, when it was built. The building is faced with terra cotta, marble, and tile, and its original facade was replaced with one in the Zigzag Moderne style.

== See also ==
- List of contributing properties in the Broadway Theater and Commercial District
