= Arts District/6th Street station =

Proposed rapid transit station

Arts District/6th St

General information
- Location: Los Angeles, California
- Coordinates: 34.036746°N 118.228637°W
- Owner: Metro

Other information
- Status: Draft EIR in progress

Future services
Preceding station	Metro Rail	Following station
Union Station toward North Hollywood	B Line	Terminus
Union Station toward Wilshire/La Cienega	D Line	Terminus
Location

Arts District/6th Street station is a proposed rapid transit station on the B and D Lines, as well as the planned Southeast Gateway Line, of the Los Angeles Metro Rail system, located on 6th Street in the Arts District of Los Angeles, California. It is planned to serve as the new eastern terminus of both lines and will be the only overground station on the heavy rail network.

== Background ==
While not included in the 2009 Long Range Transportation Plan, the project was initiated by Metro due to public comments. An extension to passenger service on the B Line and D Line from Union Station and south along the Los Angeles River would add a new terminus along the river in the Arts District. Metro's Division 20 rail yard, already in the area, was expanded and upgraded to accommodate increased headways once the D Line Extension west is completed. Funds for the Draft Environmental study were appropriated in the 2018 Metro budget, and the process began in 2021. The station was not included in Measure M or Measure R, and funds from those ballot measures are not programmed for construction of the project.

On August 11, 2021, the Los Angeles City Transportation Committee approved the usage of a portion of the $235,000,000 allocated to the Central Cities region in Measure M's Subregional Equity Program to fully fund the Arts District/6th Street station, with the remainder to be split evenly between the K Line Northern Extension and the Vermont Transit Corridor. Funds for the project could be available as soon as 2023. Environmental review for the station is set to be completed in the future.

Phase 2 of the planned Southeast Gateway Line is expected to have a stop at the Arts/Industrial station.
