= 6th Street (Los Angeles) =

Major thoroughfare in Los Angeles

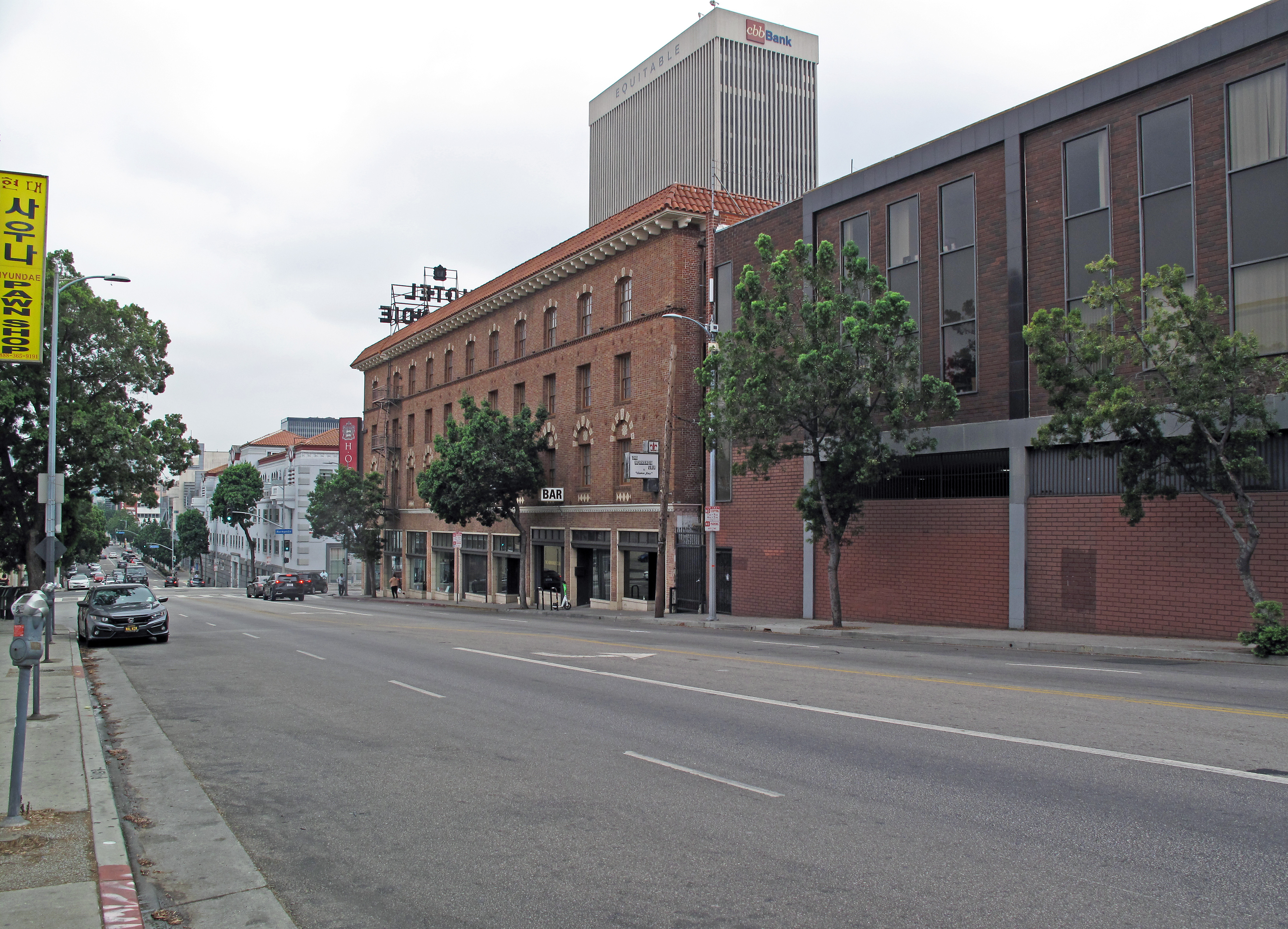
- 6th Street in Central Los Angeles
- Maintained by: Bureau of Street Services, Los Angeles Department of Water and Power
- Length: 14 mi (23 km)
- Nearest metro station: Pershing Square; Wilshire/Vermont; Wilshire/Normandie; Wilshire/Western; Wilshire/La Brea; Wilshire/Fairfax
- West end: San Vicente Boulevard in central Los Angeles
- Major junctions: SR 110; SR 60
- East end: Harding Avenue in East Los Angeles

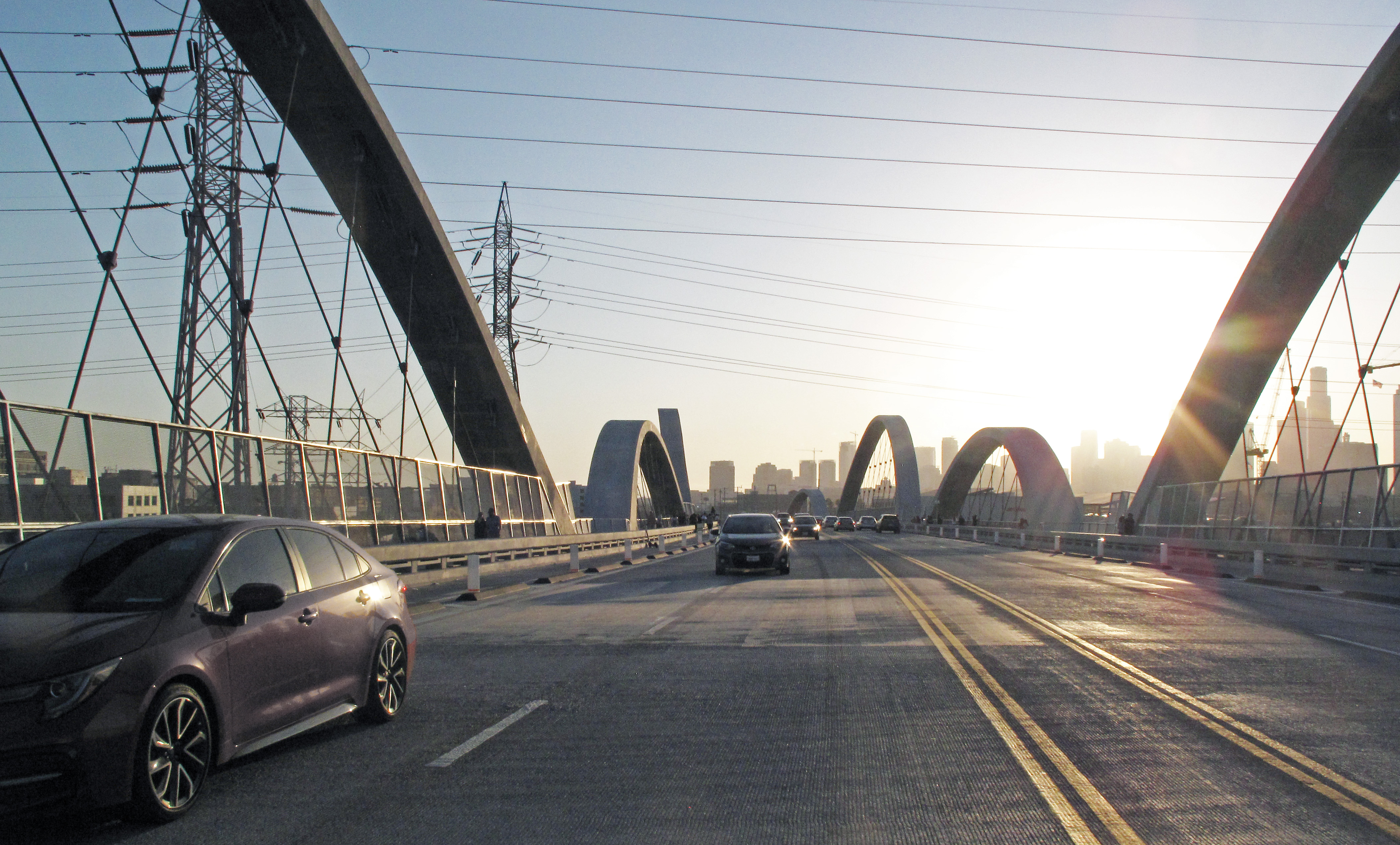
6th Street Viaduct

6th Street is an east–west thoroughfare that runs continuously for 9 miles (14 km) in downtown and central Los Angeles, California. The street also continues for 5 miles (8.0 km) in Eastside Los Angeles and East Los Angeles, although not as a thoroughfare.

== Route ==
6th street travels continuously for nine miles across central and downtown Los Angeles. From west to east, 6th street begins on the Los Angeles-Beverly Hills border, then travels through central Los Angeles (including the neighborhoods of Mid-Wilshire, Hancock Park, Windsor Square, Koreatown, Wilshire Center, and Westlake), then continues through downtown (including the Financial District; Historic Core's Jewelry, Broadway Theater and Spring Street Financial districts; Skid Row; and Arts District). The continuous portion of 6th Street ends at the downtown Los Angeles-Eastside Los Angeles border, where through traffic continues onto Whittier Boulevard via the 6th Street Viaduct, a 3,500 foot (1.1 km) viaduct that spans numerous train tracks, the Los Angeles River, and US 101. 6th Street also continues as a discontinuous local road for approximately 5 miles (8.0 km) in Eastside Los Angeles and East Los Angeles.

Through much of downtown, 6th Street is part of a one-way couplet with 5th Street, 5th Street traveling westbound and 6th Street eastbound. 5th Street merges into 6th as it exits downtown to the west, and 6th is two-way outside downtown.

State Route 110 has offramps that connect to 6th Street, but there are no on-ramp connections. Similarly, State Route 60 has a westbound onramp and offramp at 6th Street, but no eastbound connection. 6th Street is discontinuous and therefore does not connect with US 101, Interstate 710, and a concurrent section of Interstate 5 and Interstate 10.

== Transit ==
Three bus lines travel along 6th Street: Metro Local Lines 18 and 20, and Metro Rapid Line 720. Metro Local Line 18 travels along 6th from Western Avenue in Koreatown to Whittier Boulevard in downtown Los Angeles. Likewise, Metro Rapid Line 720 travels along 6th from Burlington Avenue in Westlake to Whittier Boulevard. Metro Local Line 20 also travels on 6th from Westlake to downtown, although it only goes as far as Valencia Street westbound and Main Street eastbound. Furthermore, each of these routes travel on 5th instead of 6th westbound through downtown, as much of the downtown section of 6th street is one-way eastbound.

Los Angeles Metro's B and D lines parallel 6th Street for a significant portion of their routes, with the Wilshire/Western, Wilshire/Normandie, Wilshire/Vermont, and Pershing Square stations located one block from 6th Street and the Westlake/MacArthur Park and 7th Street/Metro Center stations located two blocks from 6th street. The D Line Extension will also add two more stations within one block of 6th Street: Wilshire/La Brea and Wilshire/Fairfax, and an additional B and D line station has been proposed on 6th Street in the Arts District.

== Notable landmarks ==
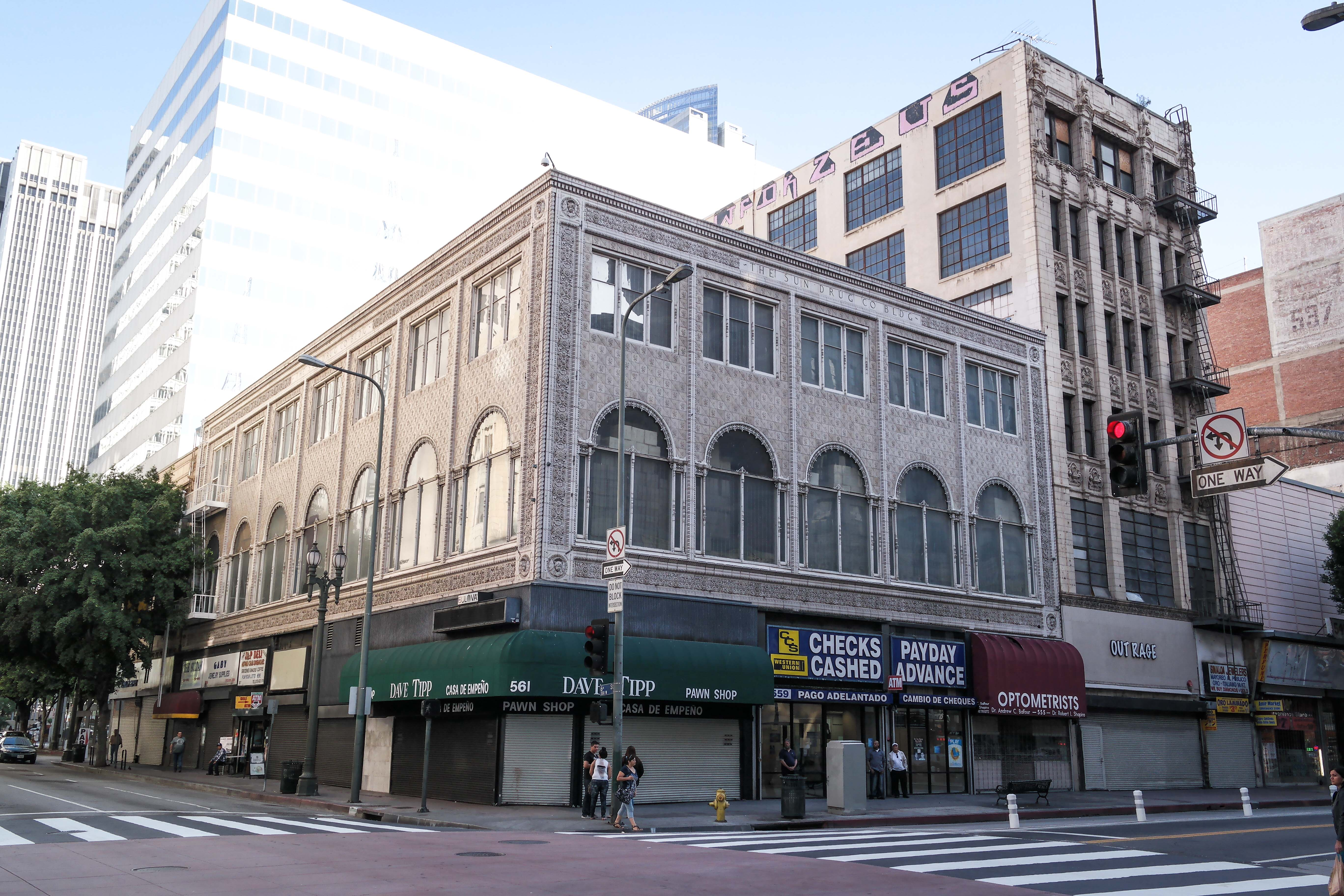
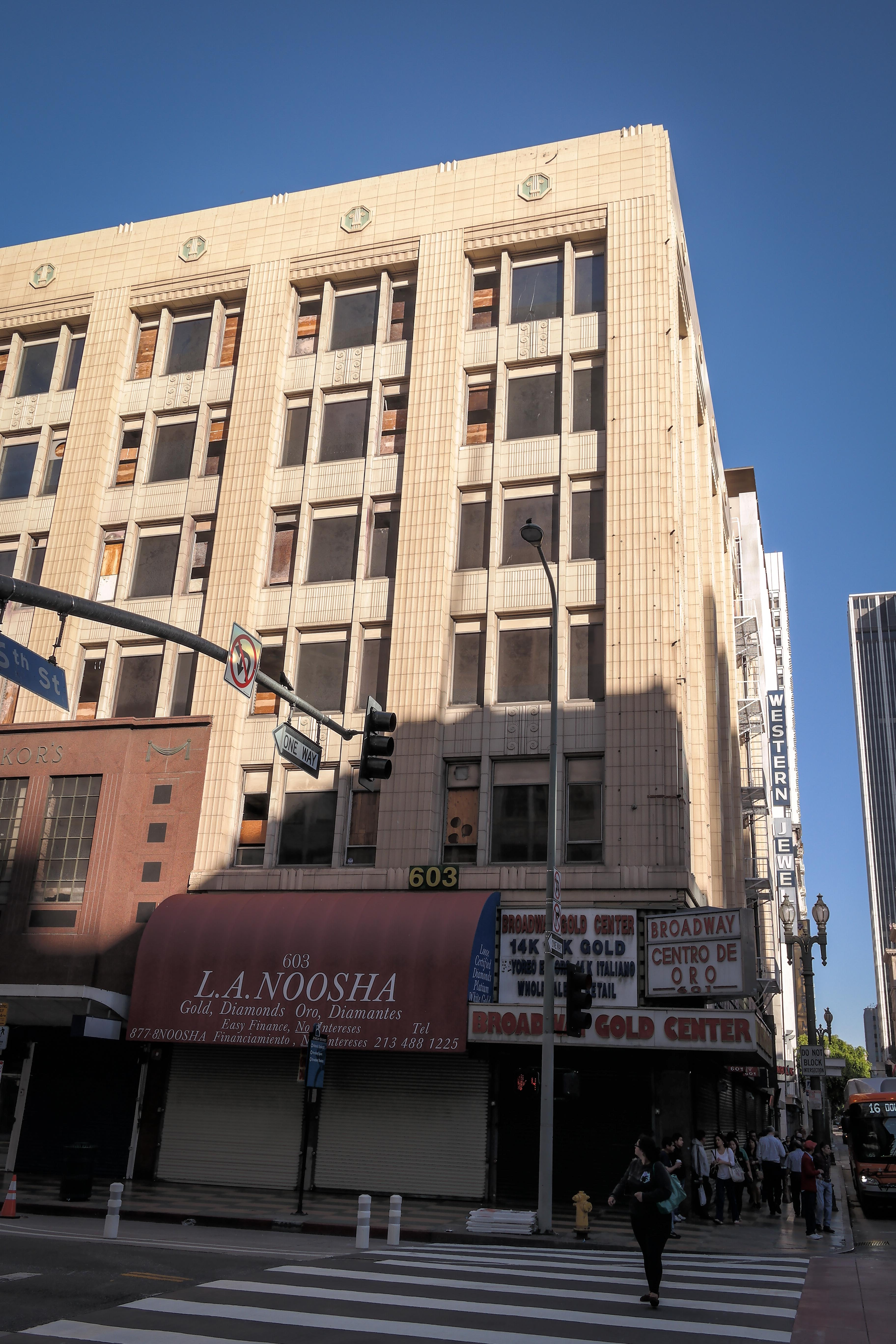
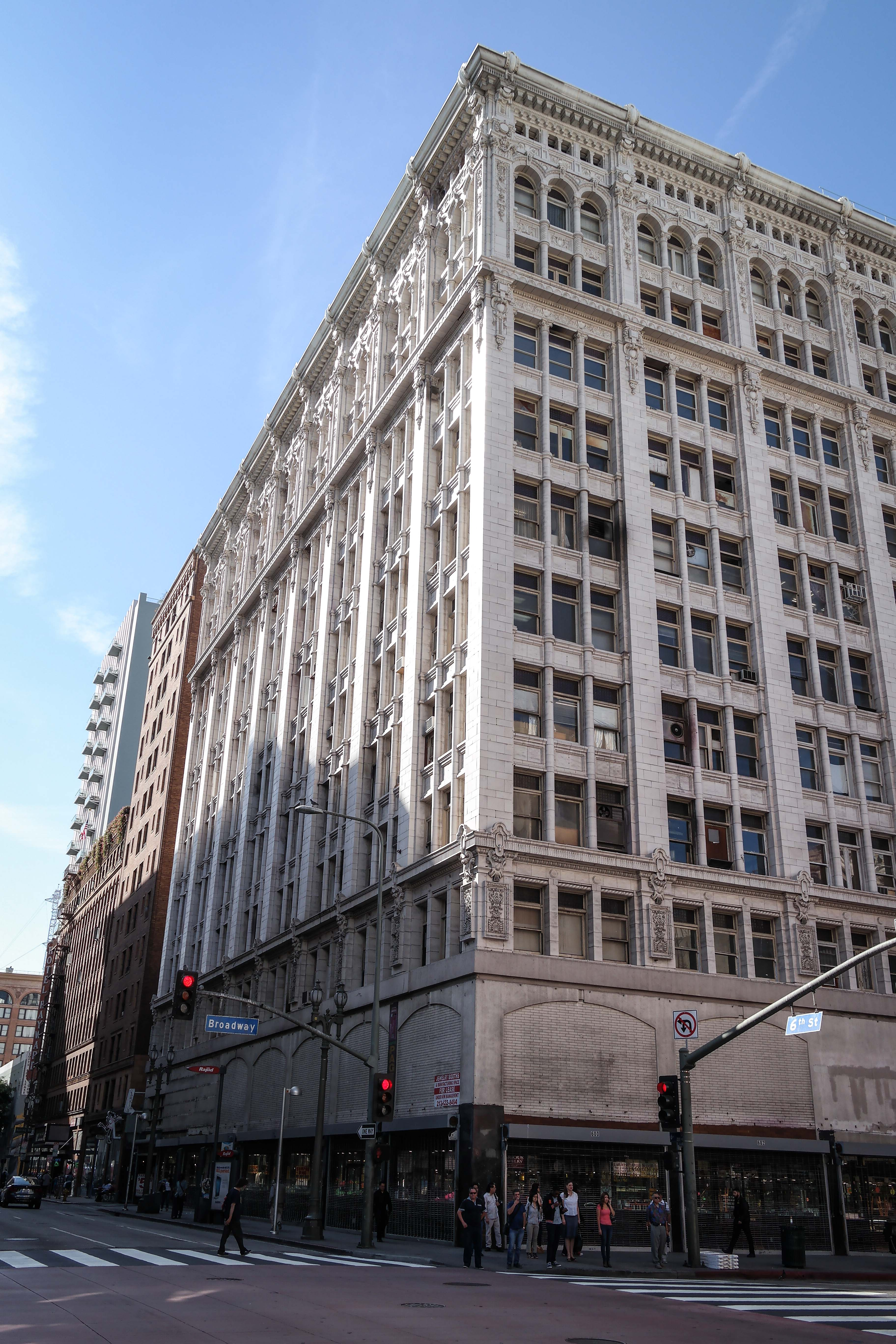
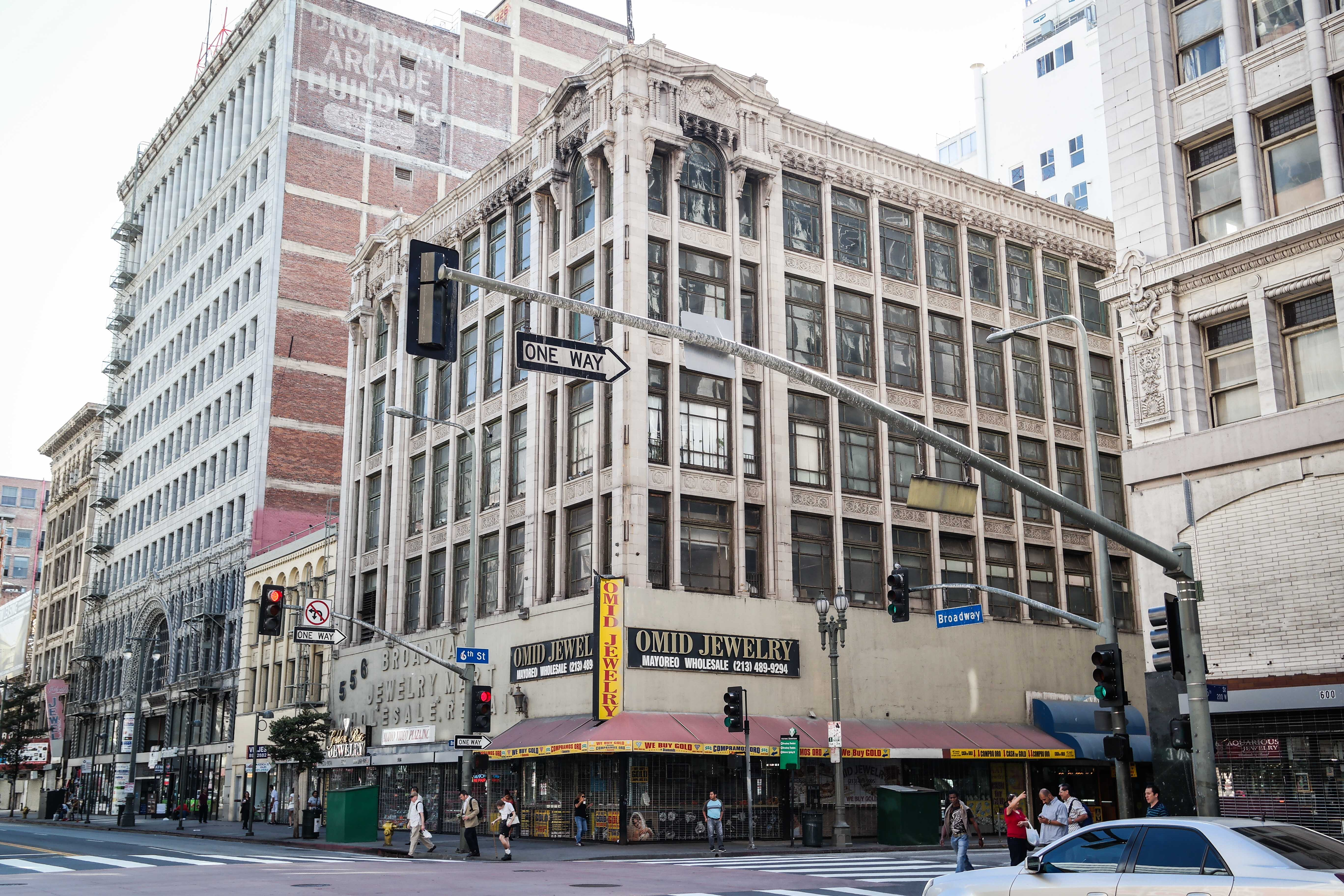
6th and Broadway in the Broadway Theater District. Clockwise from upper left: Swelldom Building, Norton Building, Silverwood's Building, and Walter P. Story Building

Many of Los Angeles's most notable landmarks are located on or abut 6th Street, including (from west to east): Los Angeles County Museum of Art, La Brea Tar Pits, MacArthur Park, Pershing Square, and 6th Street Viaduct. Additionally, six Los Angeles Historic-Cultural Monuments are located on 6th Street: Park Plaza Hotel, Chapman Park Studio Building, Chapman Park Market Building, Founder's Church of Religious Science, Pacific Mutual Building, and the aforementioned MacArthur Park.

Additional landmarks on 6th Street include:

- West of downtown - Park La Brea, Hotel Normandie, First Congregational Church of Los Angeles, Lafayette Park, Felipe De Neve Branch Library, LAPD Rampart Station, and Good Samaritan Hospital
- Downtown - 611 Place, Superior Oil Company Building, Aon Center, PacMutual Building, Heron Building, Western Jewelry Mart, Swelldom Building, Norton Building, Silverwood's Building, Walter P. Story Building, Hotel Hayward, Pacific Southwest Bank Building, Lloyd's Bank Building, United California Bank Building, Pacific Electric Building, Santa Fe Building, and LAPD Central Station
- East of downtown - Hollenbeck Park, Loved Ones at Calvary Cemetery, and Atlantic Avenue Park.

Schools on 6th Street include (from west to east): John Burroughs Middle School, Young Oak Kim Academy, New Covenant Academy, Larchmont Charter, Rise Kohyang Elementary, The Chicago School Los Angeles campus, Hollenbeck Middle School, Theodore Roosevelt High School, Collegiate Charter High School of Los Angeles, Rowan Avenue Elementary School, Garfield High School, and Joseph Gascon Elementary School.

== In popular culture ==
6th Street is mentioned in the Randy Newman song "I Love L.A."
