= Los Angeles Board of Trade Building =

- Board of Trade Building
- U.S. National Register of Historic Places
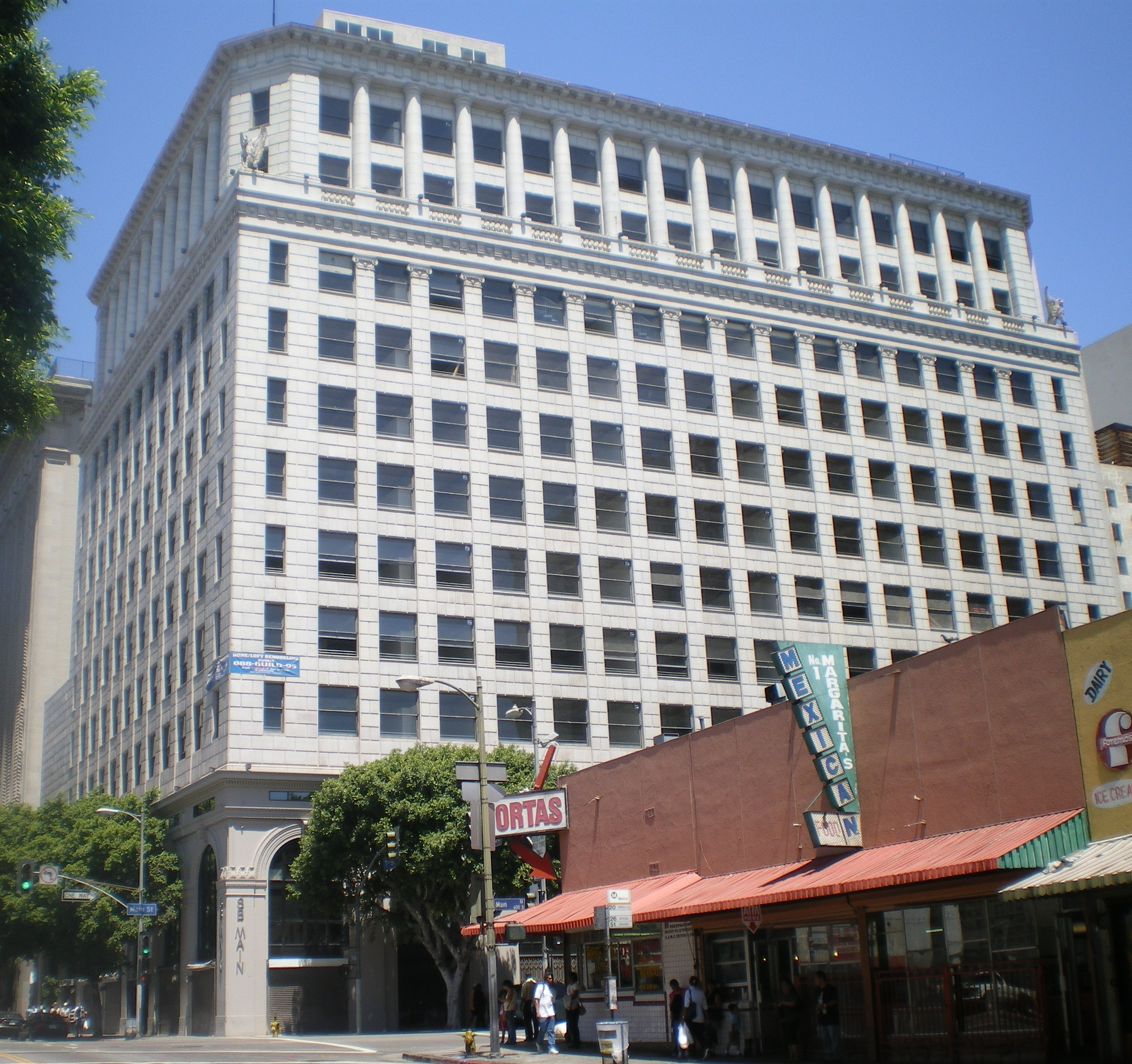
- Board of Trade Building, 2008

- Location within the Los Angeles metropolitan area Location within California Location within the United States
- Location: 111 W. 7th St., Los Angeles, California
- Coordinates: 34°2′39″N 118°15′5″W
- Built: 1929
- Architect: Claud Beelman and Alexander Curlett
- Architectural style: Beaux Arts Classical Revival
- NRHP reference No.: 07001439
- Added to NRHP: January 24, 2008

Board of Trade Building is a historic building in Downtown Los Angeles that was opened in 1929. Located at the northwest corner of Main Street and Seventh Street, the building was designed by Claud Beelman and Alexander Curlett in the Beaux Arts style with Classical Revival influence. The building was listed in the National Register of Historic Places in 2008 and is one of more than ten Claud Beelman buildings included in the National Register.

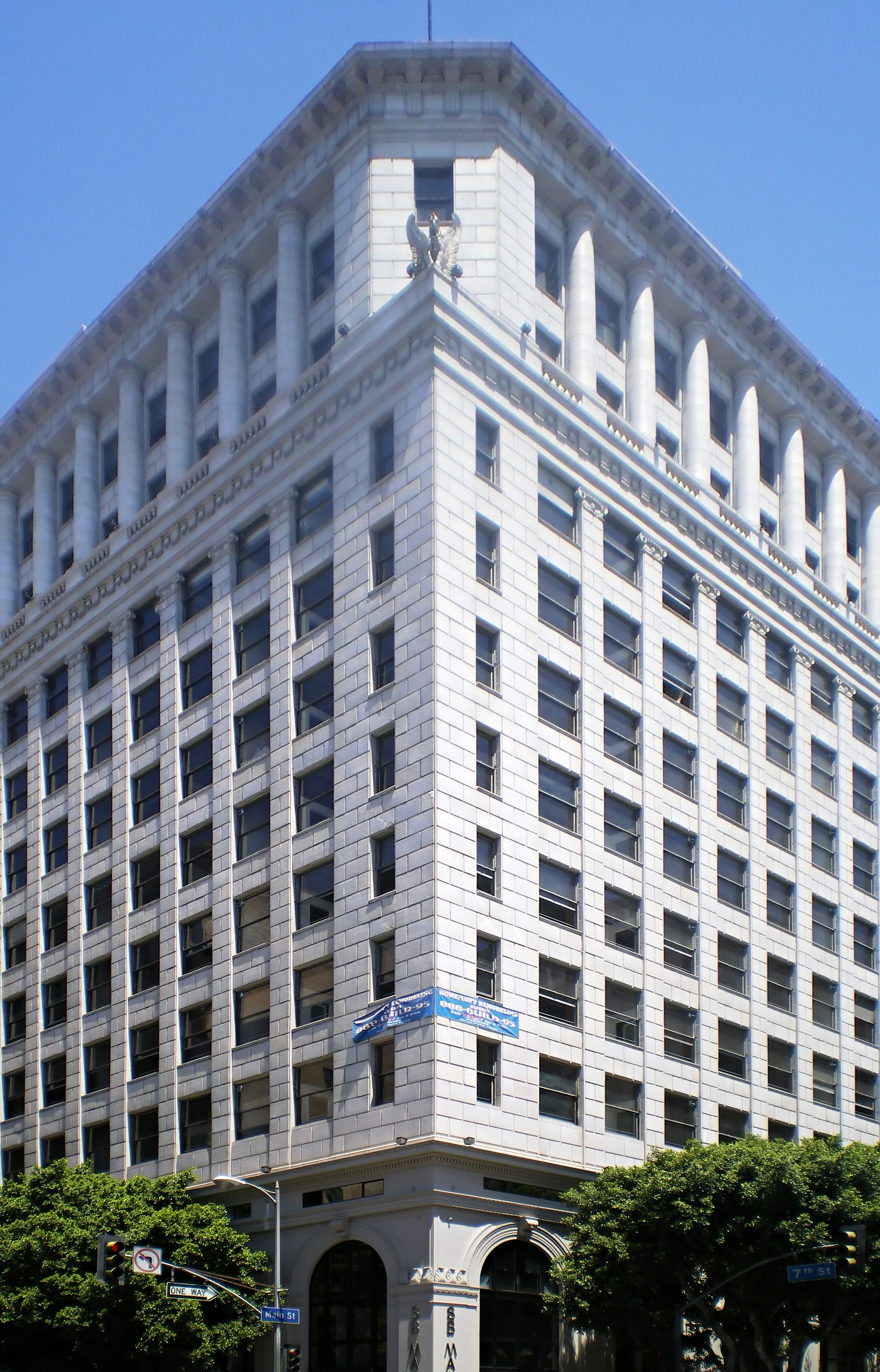
Board of Trade Building

Upon completion, the building had 230,000 square feet (21,000 m^{2}) of space and fourteen stores on the ground floor, with the remainder of the building utilized for offices. The building was the headquarters for the new California Stock Exchange starting in January 1930. The exchange's trading floor, located on the building's second floor, was patterned after the New York Stock Exchange, measured 89 by 90 feet (27 m) and was designed to accommodate 300 brokers. The exchange also included six trading posts with price indicators for 384 issues, a clearing-house, visitors' gallery, smoking-room for members, private offices for executives, committee rooms and locker rooms. The first trade recorded on the exchange in January 1930 involved 100 shares of "Bolsa Chica Oil 'A'."

The Board of Trade Building was the first on the Pacific Coast to be built with automated elevators that stopped automatically on the floors where buttons were pressed, and without the need for an operator in the elevator car.

In 1945, the Board of Trade Building was purchased for $1,250,000 by a syndicate represented by Gray Phelps & Co.

Like many of the old buildings in downtown Los Angeles, the building has been converted into live/work lofts.

== See also ==
- List of Registered Historic Places in Los Angeles

Media related to Los Angeles Board of Trade Building at Wikimedia Commons
