= William and Alexander Curlett =

Irish-born American architect

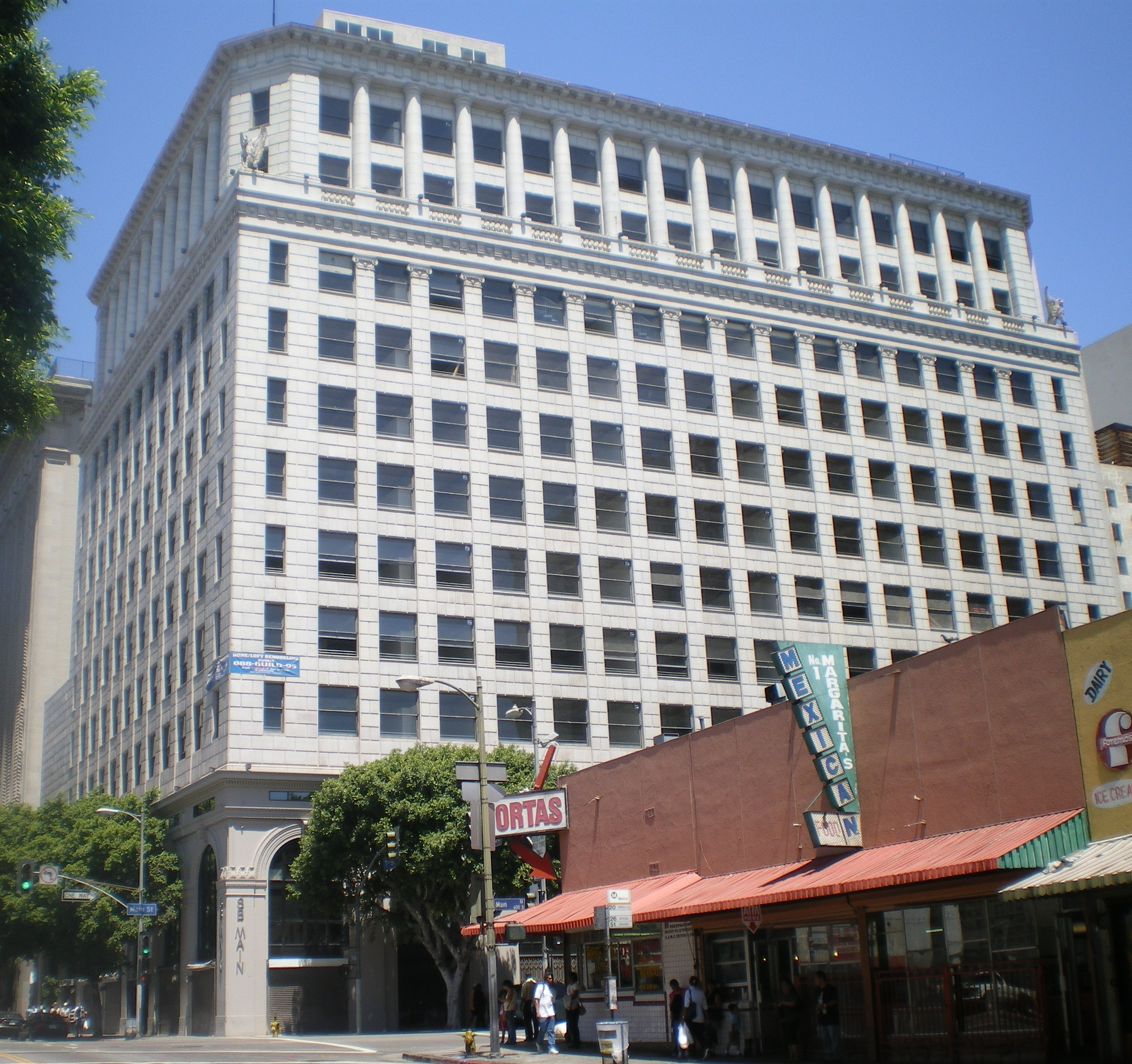
Los Angeles Board of Trade Building

William F. Curlett (County Down, Ireland, March 3, 1846 – January 21, 1914, San Francisco) and Alexander Edward Curlett (called Aleck) (San Francisco, February 6, 1881 – September 5, 1942) were a father-and-son pair of architects. They worked together as partners under the name of William Curlett and Son, Architects from c. 1908–1916. Aleck Curlett partnered with Claud Beelman as Curlett & Beelman (1919–1932).

The San Francisco firm of Curlett, Eisen, & Cuthbertson, Architects, was active in the 1880s; it designed the Los Angeles County Courthouse in 1887. In 1888, the firm occupied Room #41 of the Downey Block. (See Los Angeles, California, City Directory, 1888, p. 768.)

== Works ==
=== National Register of Historic Places ===
A number of works by either or both Curletts are listed on the U.S. National Register of Historic Places. These works (in California unless otherwise noted) include:

==== William Curlett ====
- Theodore F. Payne House (1881), San Francisco
- Mutual Savings Bank Building (1902), San Francisco
- Packard Library (1906), Marysville
- Phelan Building (1908), San Francisco
- Villa Montalvo (1914), Saratoga
- Haas Californiandy Factory, San Francisco

==== Alexander and William Curlett ====
- Merchant's National Bank Building (1913), Los Angeles
- Hotel Congress (1918), Tucson, Arizona
- Rialto Theatre (1920), Tucson, Arizona
- Rialto Building, Tucson, Arizona

==== Alexander Curlett ====
- Building at 816 South Grand Avenue (1924), Los Angeles
- Roosevelt Building (1926), Los Angeles
- Fifth Street Store Building (1927), Los Angeles
- Board of Trade Building (1929), Los Angeles
- Equitable Building of Hollywood (1929/1931), Los Angeles

==== Curlett & Beelman ====
- Cooper Arms Apartments (1923), Long Beach
- California-Canadian Bank Building (1923), Los Angeles
- Culver Hotel (1924), Culver City
- Chester Williams Building (1926), Los Angeles
- Heinsbergen Decorating Company Building (1928), Los Angeles
- Security Building (1928), Phoenix, Arizona

=== Other works ===
Other of their works include:

- New Lanfranco Block (1888), Los Angeles, with Eisen and Cuthbertson
- Potomac Block (1890), Los Angeles, with Block and Eisen
- St. Mark's Episcopal Church (1902), Berkeley
- Foreman & Clark Building (1929), Los Angeles, with Beelman
- Commercial Club of Southern California, Los Angeles
