= Spring Street (Los Angeles) =

Thoroughfare in downtown Los Angeles

- Spring Street looking north from 8th Street
- Interactive map of Spring Street
- Former name: Calle Primavera
- Maintained by: City of Los Angeles
- Length: 3 mi (4.8 km)
- Location: Los Angeles, California, United States
- Nearest metro station: Chinatown station
- South end: Main Street and 9th Street in downtown Los Angeles
- Major junctions: US 101 in downtown (northbound offramp only)
- Northeast end: North Broadway and Avenue 18 in Lincoln Heights

Construction
- Inauguration: prior to 1849
- Spring Street Financial District
- U.S. National Register of Historic Places
- U.S. Historic district
- Spring Street looking north from 6th Street in 1915

- Location within Los Angeles
- Location: 354–704 S. Spring St., Los Angeles, California
- Coordinates: 34°2′48″N 118°14′59″W
- Built: 1902-1930s
- Architect: numerous
- Architectural style: primarily Beaux Arts
- NRHP reference No.: 79000489
- Added to NRHP: August 10, 1979

Spring Street is one of the oldest streets in Los Angeles. A section of the street in downtown Los Angeles, between north of Fourth Street and south of Seventh, is listed in the National Register of Historic Places as the Spring Street Financial District and was formerly known as Wall Street of the West. The stretch is lined with Beaux Arts buildings and forms part of Los Angeles's historic core.

== Name ==
Originally named Calle Primavera, Spring Street was renamed in 1849 by city surveyor Edward Ord. He named the street after a woman he was wooing, one whom he'd given the nickname “mi primavera, my springtime”.

== Geography ==
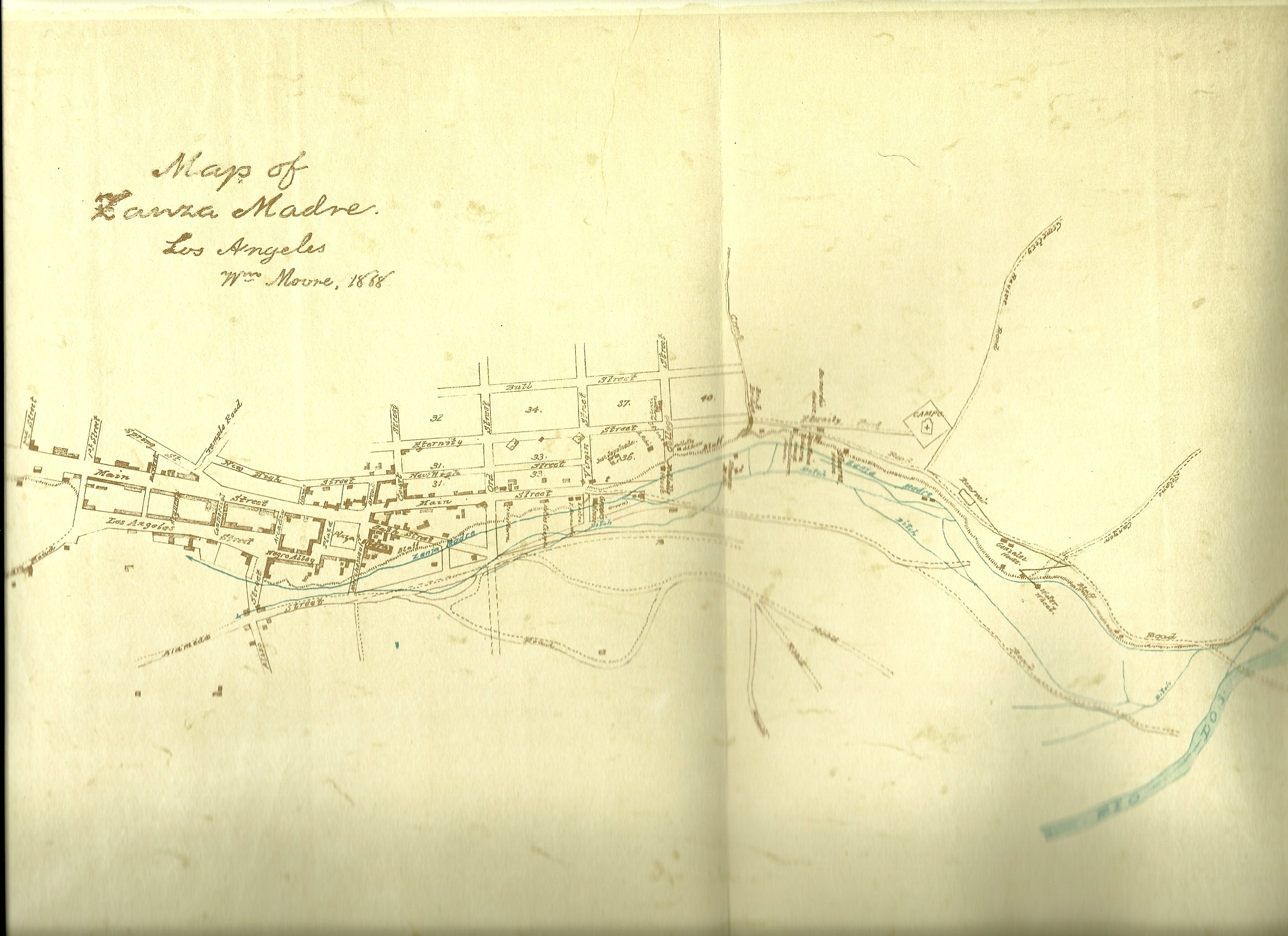
Spring and Eternity streets on an 1868 map

Spring Street consists of three sections. The original section begins in the south from the intersection of 9th Street. At 7th Street, the Spring Street Financial District begins, north of 4th Street. Spring Street's original section ends at a three-way junction with Cesar Chavez Avenue.

Spring Streets second section begins one block east of its junction with Cesar Chavez Avenue. Here, Spring Street travels northeast through Chinatown, terminating at College Street. This section was originally called Calle de la Eternidad (Eternity Street), then Upper Main Street, and by 1897, San Fernando Street.

One block east of Spring and College street, a third section of Spring Street continues northeast and crosses the Los Angeles River into Lincoln Heights. This section ends at Avenue 18, where it transitions to North Broadway. This section was previously named San Fernando Street, Olympia Street, and Downey Street.

== Historic district ==
Spring Street Financial District is a historic district that contains 27 contributing properties, all located between north of Fourth Street and south of Seventh. In the first half of the 20th century, this stretch was the financial center of Los Angeles, and many important banks and financial institutions were located here. More than ten buildings in the district were designed in whole or in part by John Parkinson, and more than ten buildings have been designated as Historic-Cultural Monuments by the Los Angeles Cultural Heritage Commission.

The area was listed on the National Register of Historic Places in 1979 and expanded in 2000.

=== History ===
==== Early days ====
The city's central business district (CBD) in the 1880s and 1890s lay further north near South Spring and Temple Streets.

The street can claim credit as the birthplace of the motion picture business in Los Angeles. In 1898, Thomas Edison filmed a 60-second film titled "South Spring Street Los Angeles California", mounting a giant camera on a wagon to film the bustling action along South Spring Street.

==== Wall Street of the West ====
In the early 1900s, the city center began spreading south, and the city's banks and financial institutions began concentrating along South Spring Street. The first two important buildings to make the move south were the Hellman and Continental Buildings, with the Continental Building being considered the city's first skyscraper. In 1911, the Los Angeles Times boasted about the building boom on Spring Street:

The visitor to this city can at this moment observe skyscrapers in all stages of construction. It is a study which will provide the most comprehensible kind of answer to the query as to why Los Angeles is leading San Francisco, Portland, Seattle, St. Louis, Pittsburgh, Cleveland, Cincinnati, Baltimore, Detroit, Minneapolis, New Orleans, Boston, Buffalo and all other cities of anything near her in building activity as revealed by the monthly expenditures for construction work.

The building boom along South Spring Street continued into the 1920s as the population and economy of Los Angeles boomed. South Spring Street remained the city's financial center even after World War II.

==== Decline (1970s–1980s) ====
In the 1960s, many of the banks and financial institutions began moving to the western part of the downtown area, along Figueroa Street and Wilshire Boulevard. By the early 1980s, South Spring Street had become known for "transients who sleep in doorways and urinate on sidewalks." In 1982, the Los Angeles Times commented on the district's decline from "Wall Street of the West" to a blighted area with empty office buildings lining both sides of the street:

"When the banks and law firms moved to the 'Gold Coast' typified by Arco Towers, six blocks to the west, Spring Street plummeted to become a neighborhood of hoodlums, derelicts and winos—a neighborhood of echoing buildings full of absolutely nothing above the ground floor."

==== Redevelopment and regentrification ====
Since the early 1980s, South Spring Street has been the subject of numerous redevelopment projects. In recent years, numerous art galleries have moved into the old financial district, which is now known as Gallery Row. Many of the old bank buildings have also been converted into upscale lofts. As wealthier residents have moved into the district's lofts, older residents and artists have complained about the increased rents. One artist who had lived in the district for years said:

The real problem with downtown lately, Gronk and his friends half-jokingly agreed is 'those people.' Westsiders. Trust-fund babies. New tenants who demand their bohemian pleasures be liberally sweetened with suburban amenities. Landlords who previously recruited artists to help make downtown 'safe' for gentrification, then jacked up their rents so only lawyers and screenwriters could afford it.

==== Architecture ====
The strength of the district remains its period architecture. Many of the Beaux Arts façades along Spring Street remain virtually intact, making the district a popular shooting location for motion picture and television productions seeking authentic period cityscapes. In 1985, noted Los Angeles Times columnist Jack Smith pointed to the Spring Street Financial District as proof that "Los Angeles was never the cultural wasteland it was alleged to be." He hailed the district's "financial palaces" as "a solid architectural achievement" which give the street "beauty, strength, unity and dignity."

=== Buildings and sites ===
Twenty-seven buildings on or abutting Spring Street are listed in the National Register of Historic Places as contributing properties in the Spring Street Financial District. Most of these buildings housed financial institutions and are homogenous in function and style; Beaux Arts architecture is particularly common. All buildings in the district were built between the turn of the 20th century and the mid-1930s.

== North of the historic district ==
North of the historic district, Spring Street passes through the Civic Center district along government buildings built since the 1920s. However, this area was the heart of the city's business district around the 1880s and 1890s, nearly all of which was demolished.

=== Gallery ===
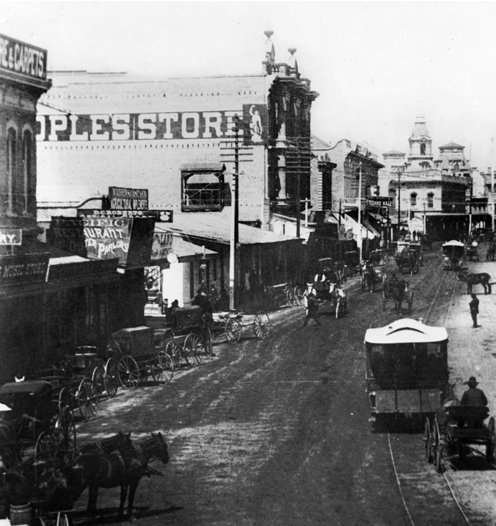
Looking northeast on Spring Street from First Street, 1880s. Asher Hamburger's Peoples Store at center. Towers of the Baker Block are visible in the distance.

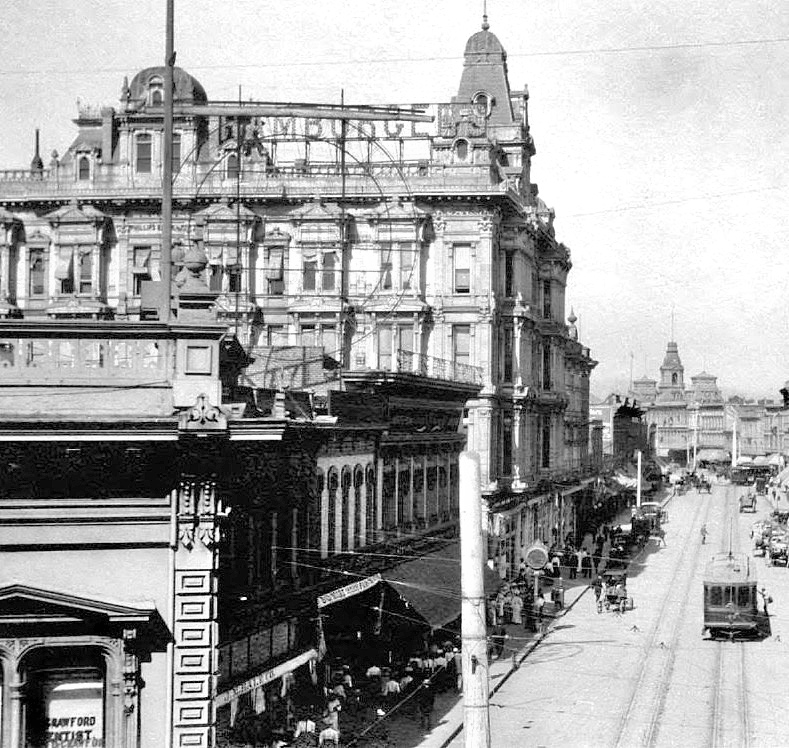
Looking northeast on Spring Street from First Street, 1890s. Hamburger's Peoples Store now in the Phillips Block at center. Electric streetcars replaced horsecars and the street is paved. Today, this is the site of City Hall.

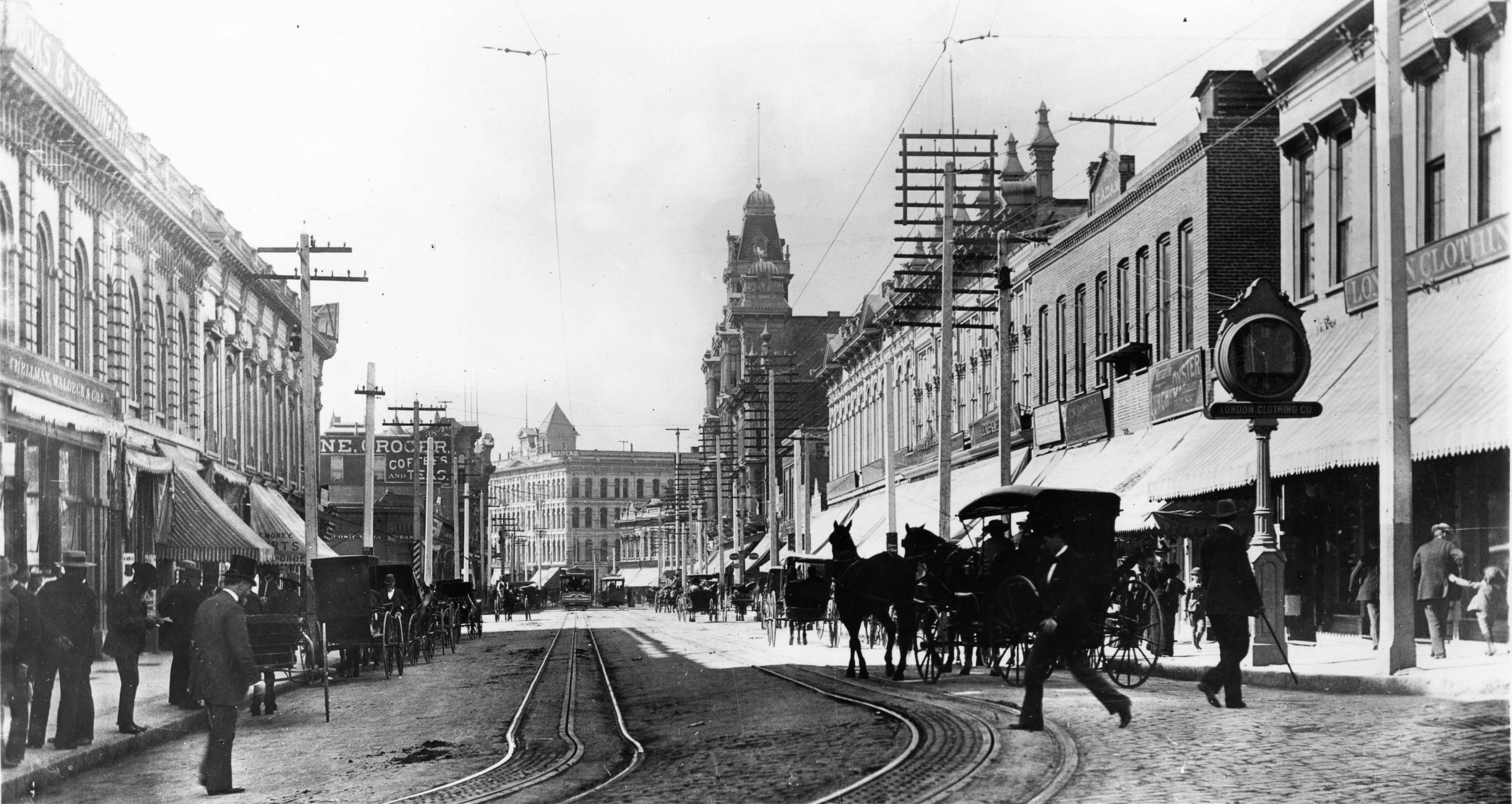
View south on Spring St. from Temple, c.1883–1894. The towers in the background are the Phillips Block; the two larger buildings to its right are the Jones Block and (with turrets) City of Paris. Far right: Allen Block and Harris & Frank's London Clothing Co., with its landmark clock.

=== West side of Spring south of Temple ===
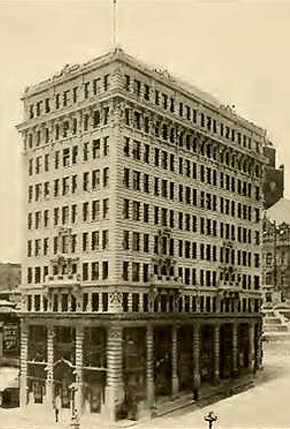
International Savings & Exchange Bank Building (1907) SW corner of Temple/Spring

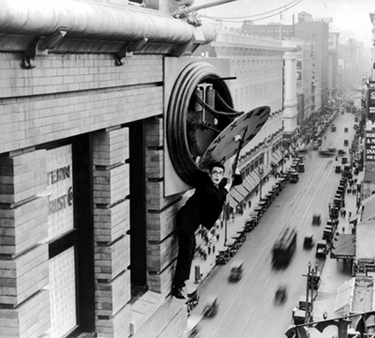
Replica of the Int'l Savings Building façade in the film Safety Last!

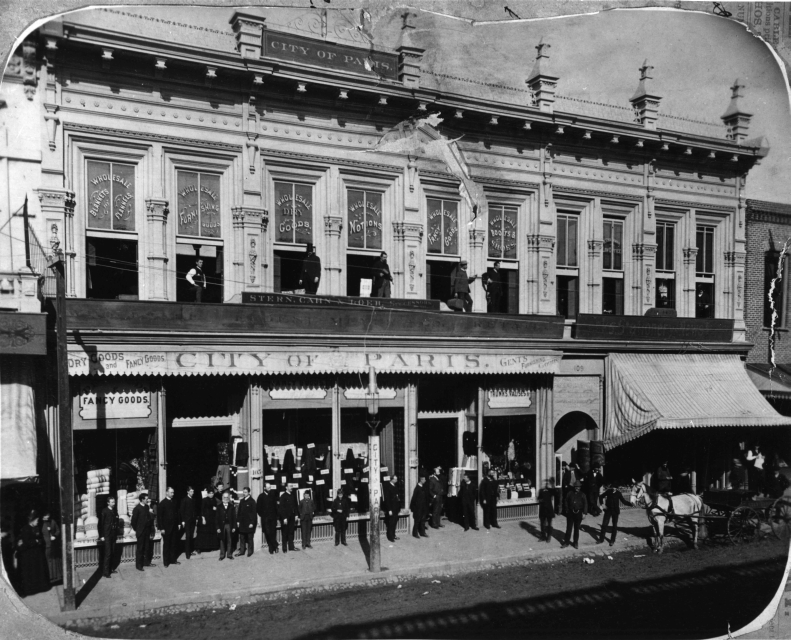
City of Paris department store, north of Phillips Block and south of Temple, sometime between 1883–1890. Note the cable car which ran 1885–1902.

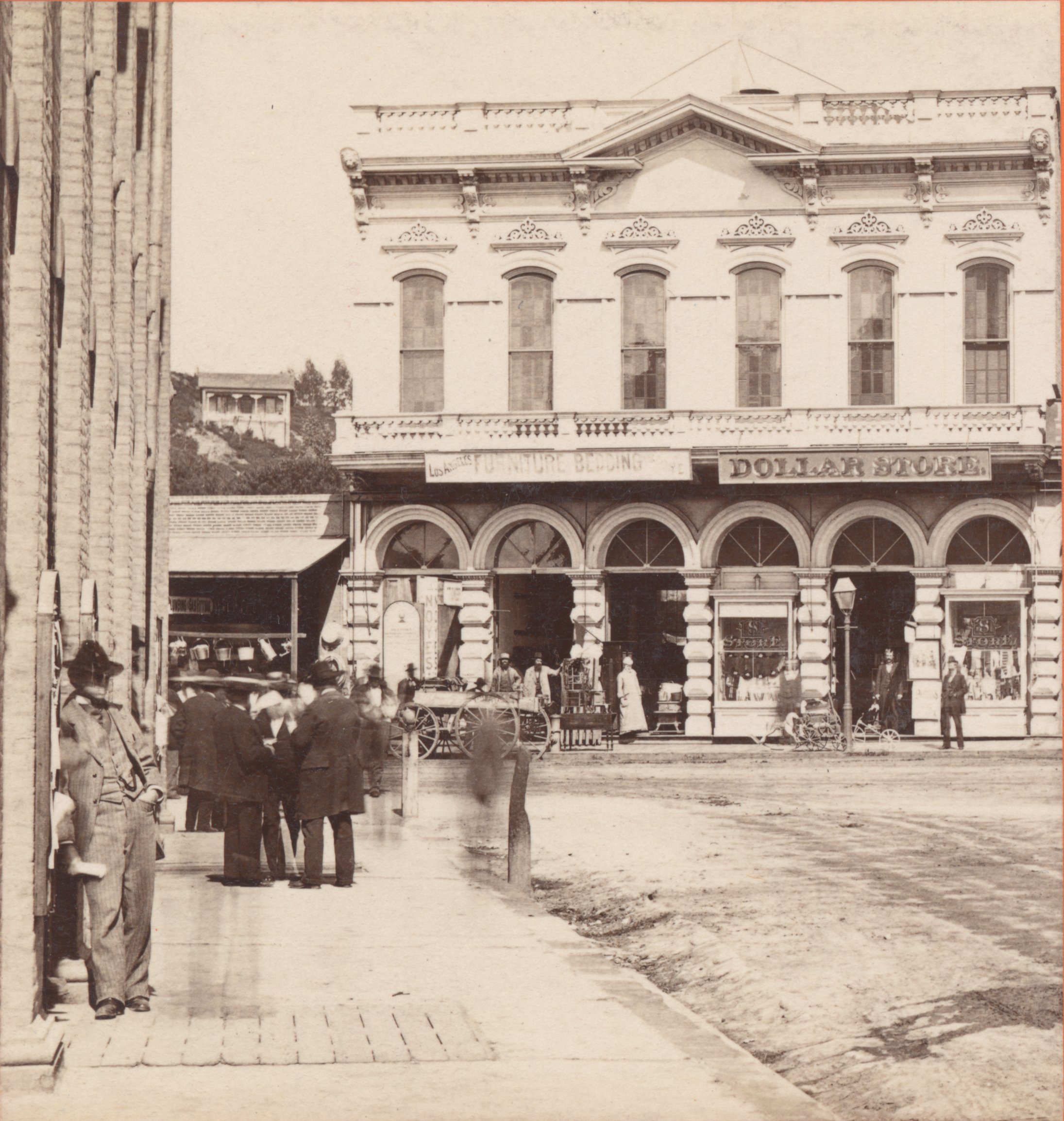
Jones Block, 171–201 N. Spring, west side across from Market St., southern building, c.1880-1885

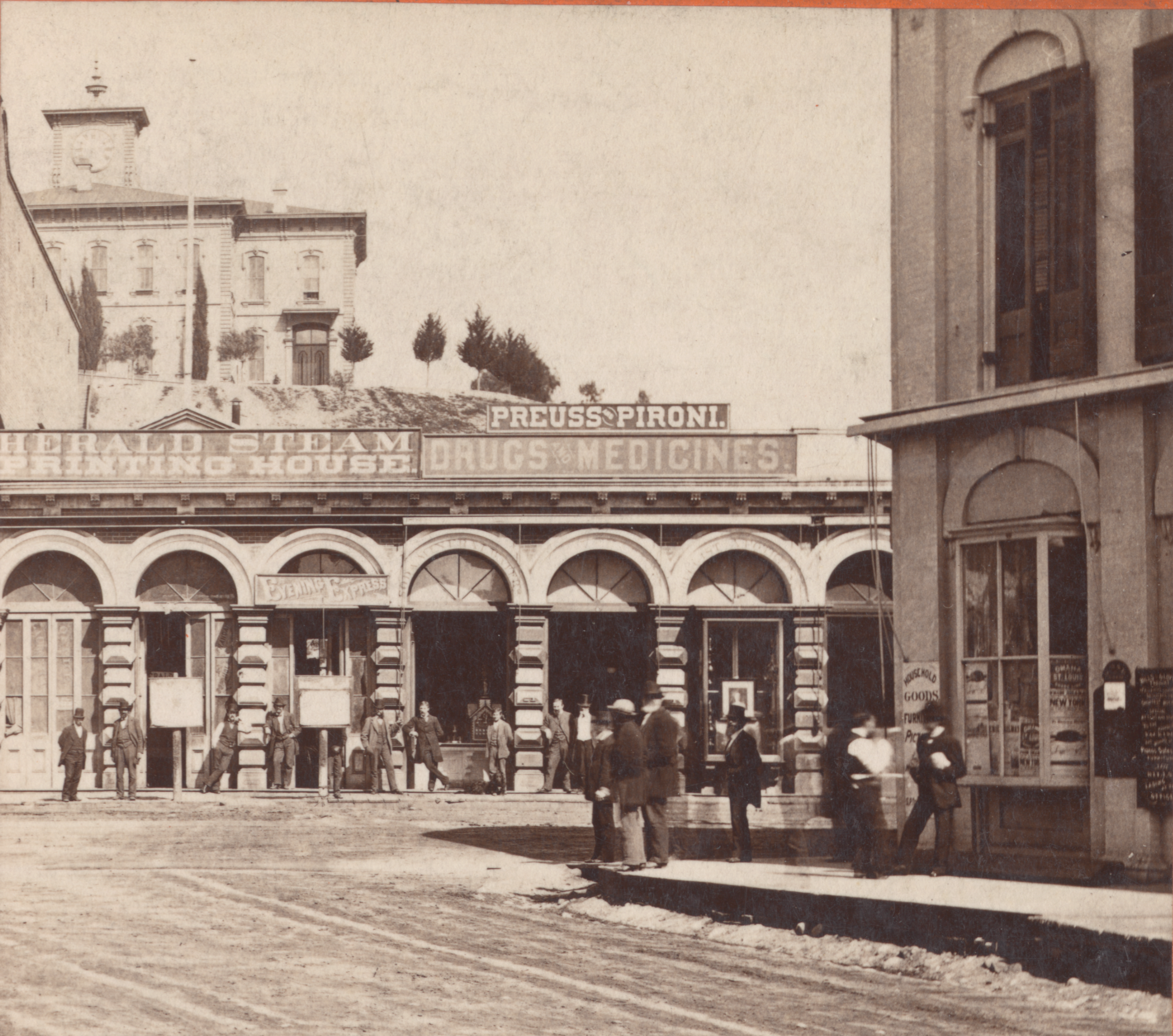
Jones Block northern building c.1880-1885. Los Angeles High School on Pound Cake Hill at back.

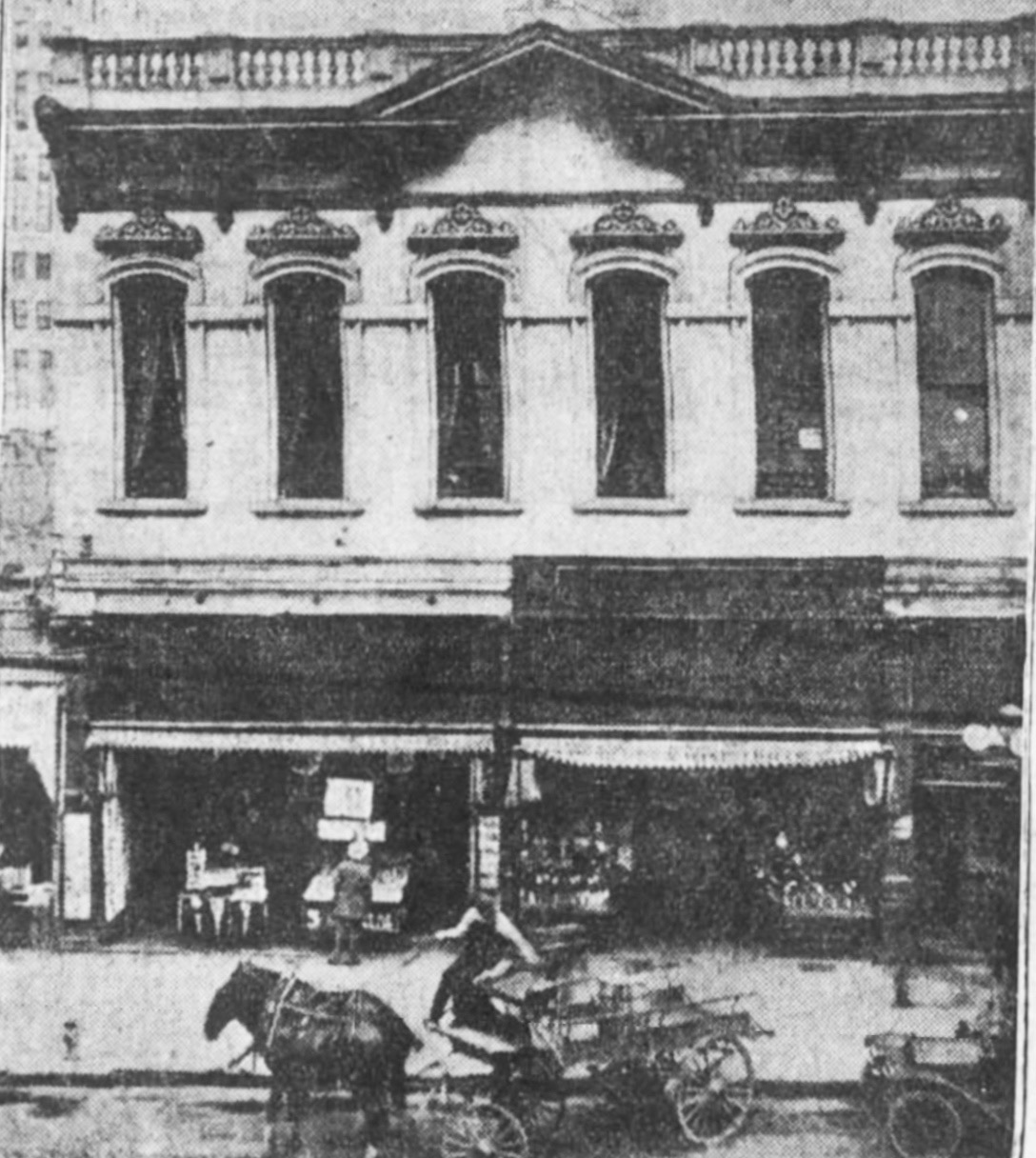
Jones Block sometime between 1886–1895 when home to J. W. Robinson's Boston Dry Goods store.

Along the west side of Spring Street were the following buildings. Spring was realigned in the 1920s and now runs west of these sites, and the sites where these buildings once stood are now part of the full city block on which City Hall stands:

- At the southwest corner of Spring and Temple was the Allen Block, between 1883 and 1894 location of Harris & Frank's London Clothing Co., with its landmark clock. The first J. W. Robinson's Boston Dry Goods store was also located in this block from 1883–1886 before moving to the Jones Block slightly south. The Allen Block was replaced by the International Savings & Exchange Bank Building (10 floors, 1907, H. Alban Reaves, Renaissance Revival and Italianate, demolished 1954-5)), southwest corner of Temple and Spring. A replica of its façade featured in the Harold Lloyd film Safety Last!, in a famous scene where Lloyd hangs off a clock near the building's roof. In its later years it housed city health offices and was called the "Old City Health Building".
- City of Paris department store, 203–7 N. Spring, west side between Temple and the Phillips Block. Spring Street now runs west of this site, which is part of City Hall.
- Jones Block
  - Built 1882 or 1883 and commissioned by Doria Deighton-Jones, demolished in the 1920s to create the City Hall block.
  - Post-1890 numbering 171–179 and 201 N. Spring St.,
  - Tenants included:
    - Los Angeles Herald offices and steam printing plant through 1888
    - J. W. Robinson's Boston Dry Goods at #171–173 from 1886 to 1895. Robinson's would become a major regional department store chain.
    - City of Paris department store at #177 during its final few years of operation, c.1895–1897.

===== Phillips Block =====
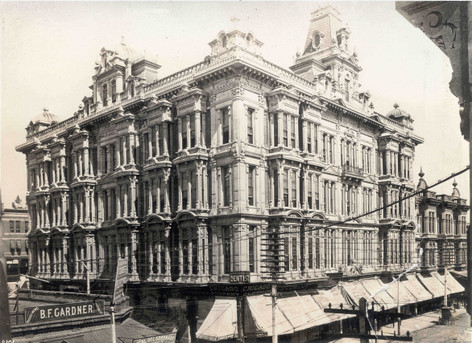
Phillips Block

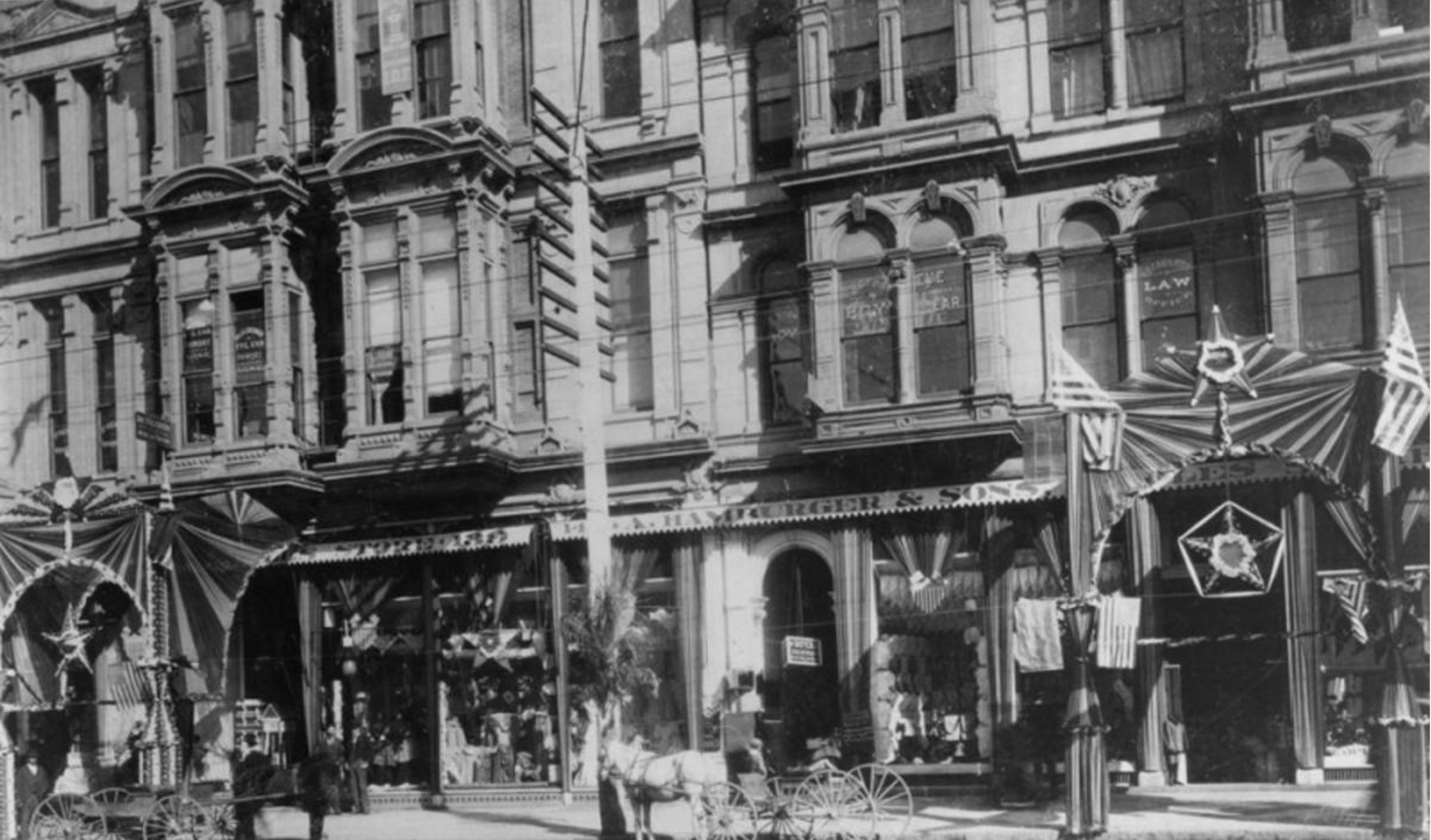
Entrance to Hamburger's department store (forerunner of May Co. California), located at the Phillips Block 1888–1908.

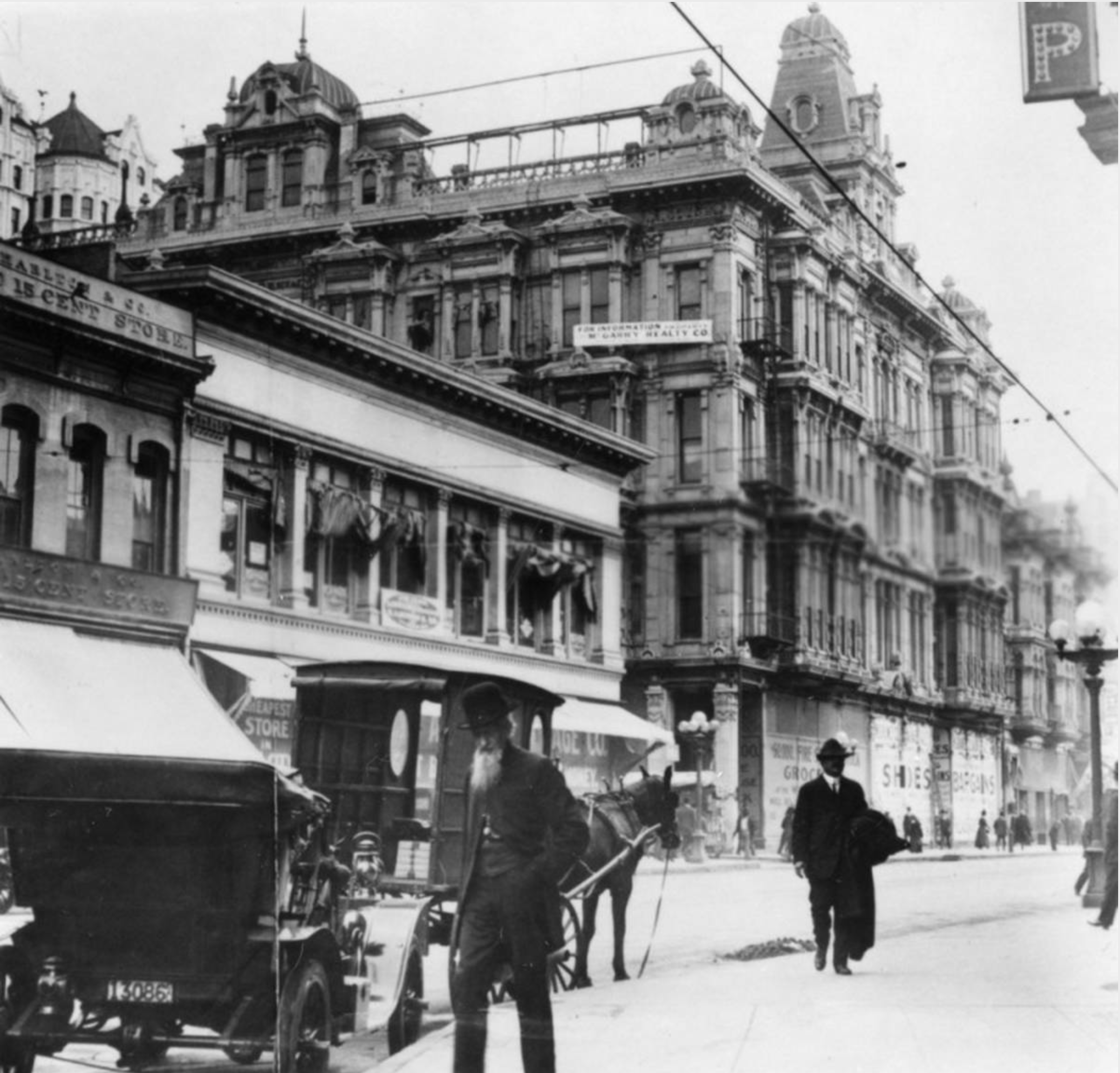
Phillips Block about 1900

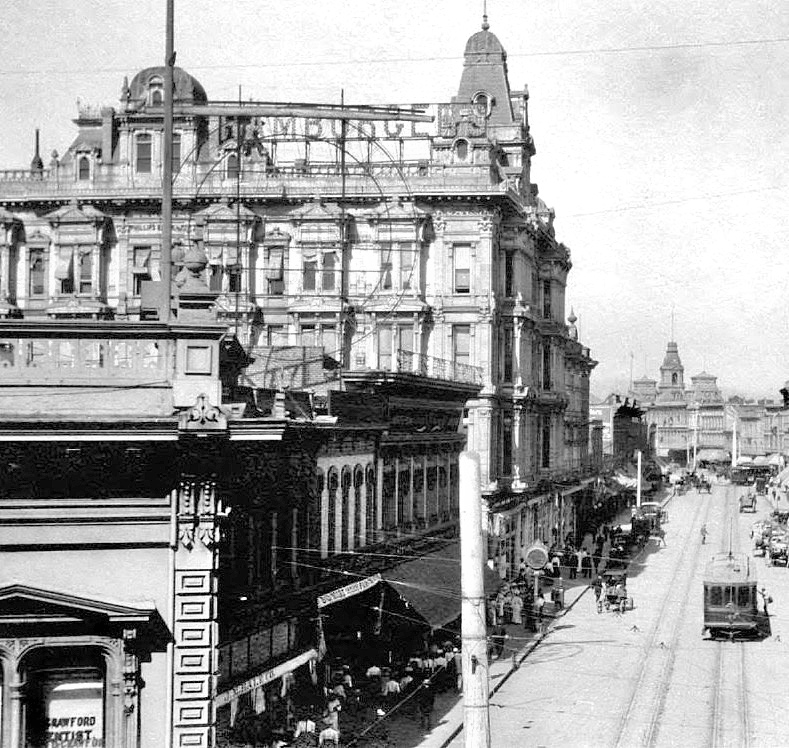
Looking north on Spring St. from First Street, 1890s with view of the Phillips Block.

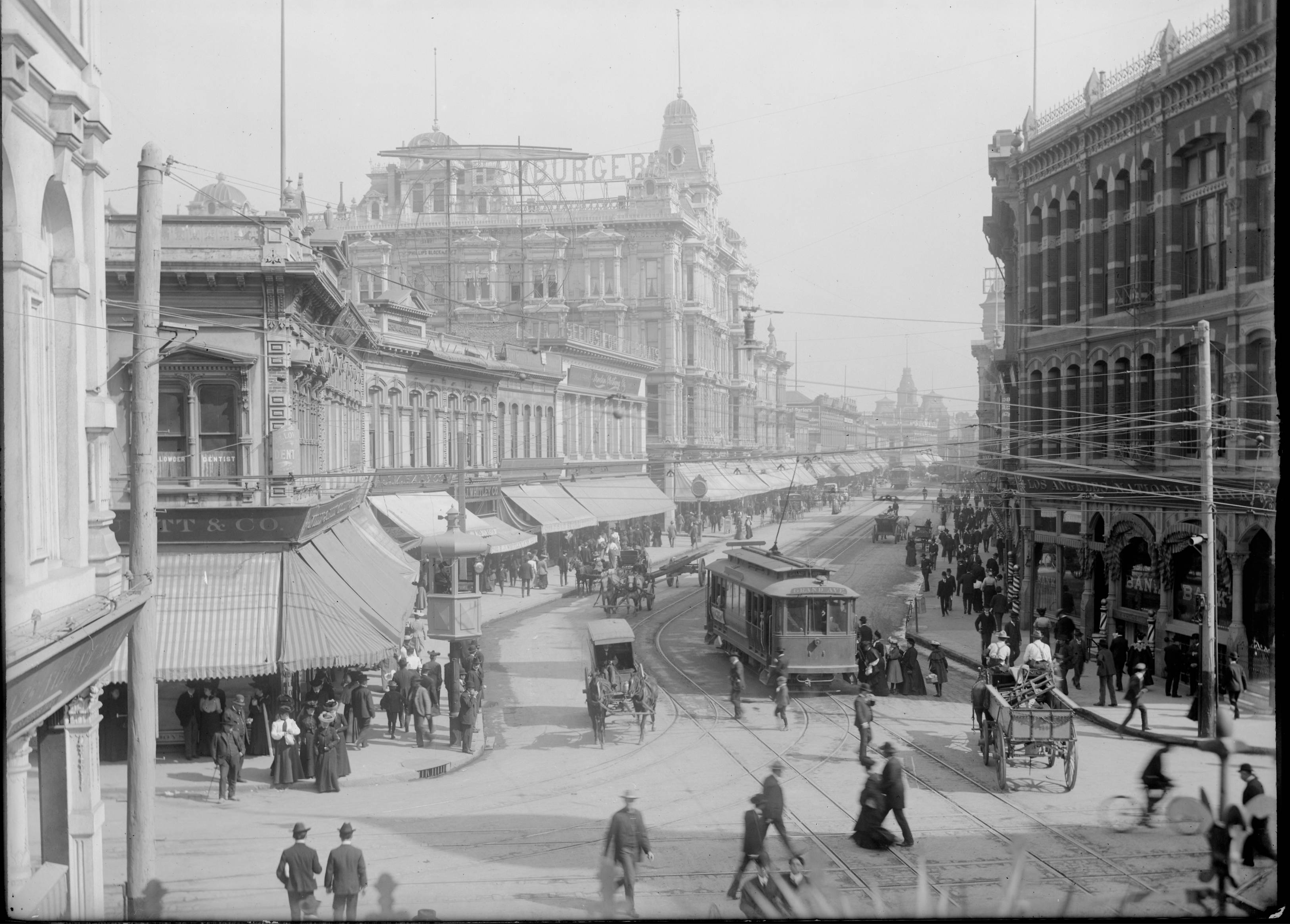
View north on Spring St. from First Street. Phillips Block visible in background, Harris & Frank's London Clothing Company at the SW corner of Franklin/Spring.

At the northwest corner of Franklin and Spring stood two buildings in succession, the Rocha Adobe, then the Phillips Block. The site now lies under the current course of Spring Street, which was straightened, i.e. realigned to run further west, in the 1920s.

- The Rocha Adobe (built 1820 as a residence for Antous Jose Rocha), 31–33 Spring Street (pre-1890 numbering), which from 1853–1884 served as the City Hall, and a building in the yard behind it served as the city and county jail. It was demolished and in its place was built:
- Phillips Block (four-and-a-half stories, opened in 1888, Burgess J. Reeve, French Renaissance Revival architecture), 25–37 N. Spring St. (pre-1890 numbering) at the northwest corner of Franklin St., backing up to New High Street to the west. Owned by Pomona Valley rancher Louis Phillips, it cost $260,000. There was 120 feet (37 m) of frontage on Spring Street, 218 feet (66 m) on Franklin, and 121 feet (37 m) along New High Street. This building was the second four-story structure in Los Angeles. It was sometimes called Phillips Block No. 1 (there was a "Phillips Block No. 2" at 135–145 Los Angeles Street, on the west side between Market and First streets). In July 1888, Asher Hamburger opened the Peoples Store here, later known as Hamburger's; it became the largest retail store in the Western United States. In 1908 it moved to 8th and Broadway, and in 1923 Hamburger sold it to May Co. and it became May Company California. The Phillips Block was demolished in the mid-1920s to make way for the realigned Spring Street and today's City Hall.

===== Franklin to First =====
At the southwest corner of Franklin Street from 1894–1905 was Harris & Frank's London Clothing Co. with its landmark clock. Harris & Frank went on to become a chain of junior department stores for men's clothing across the region.

=== East side of Spring south of Temple ===
===== Temple Block =====
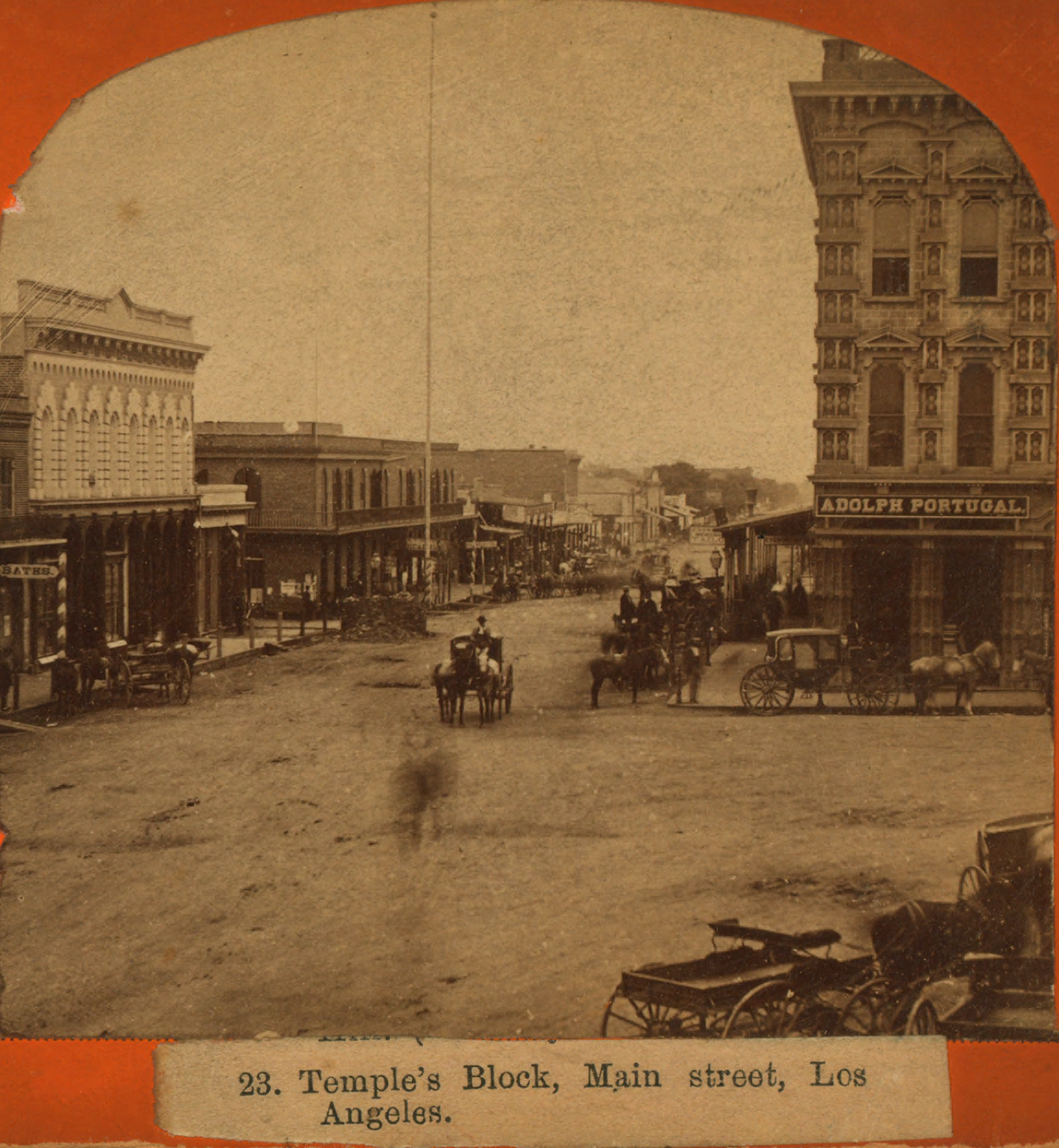
Looking south on Main St. towards Temple Block with Adolph Portugal dry goods store, mid-1870s

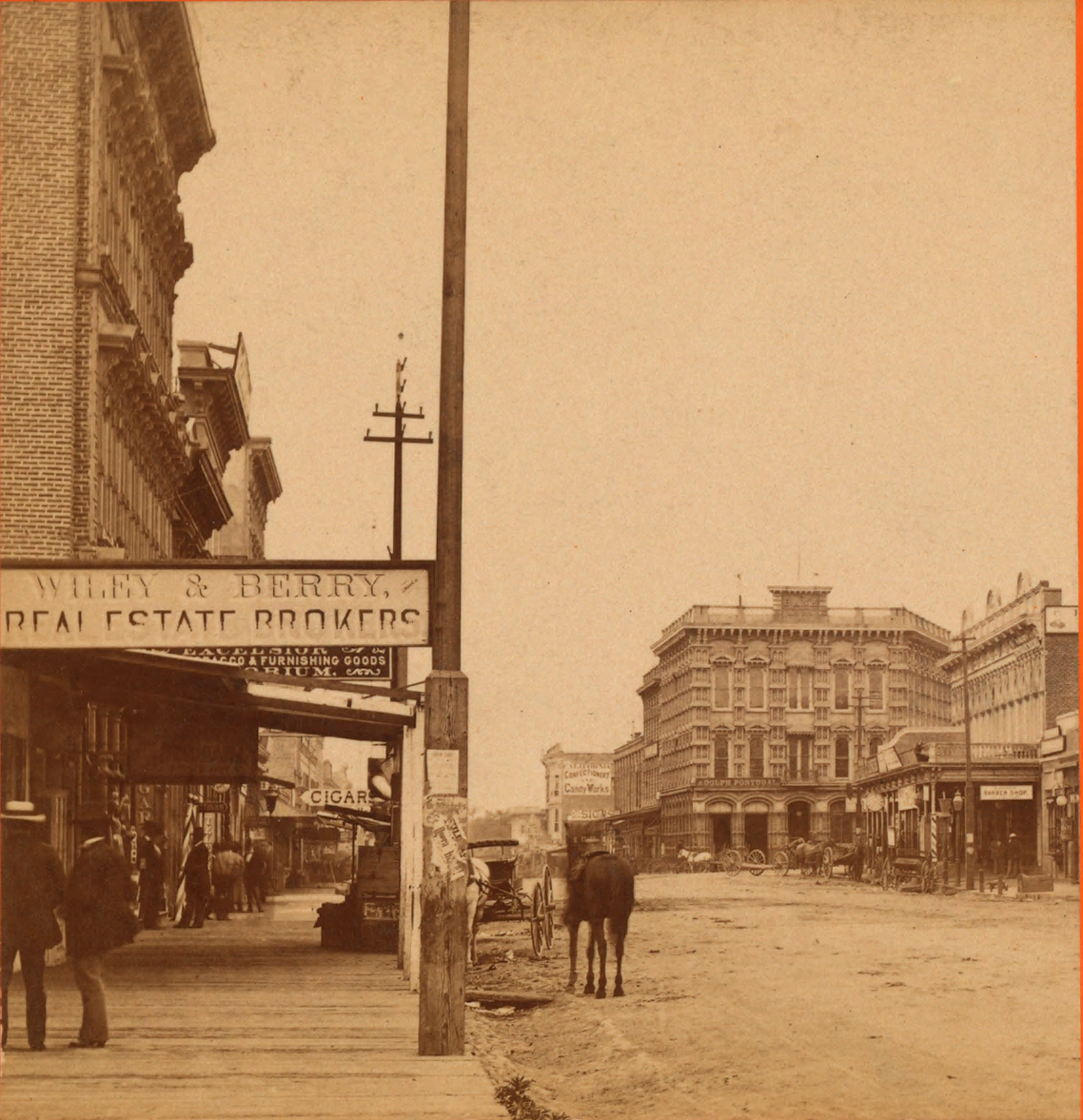
Further north on Main St., looking south towards Temple Block, mid-1870s

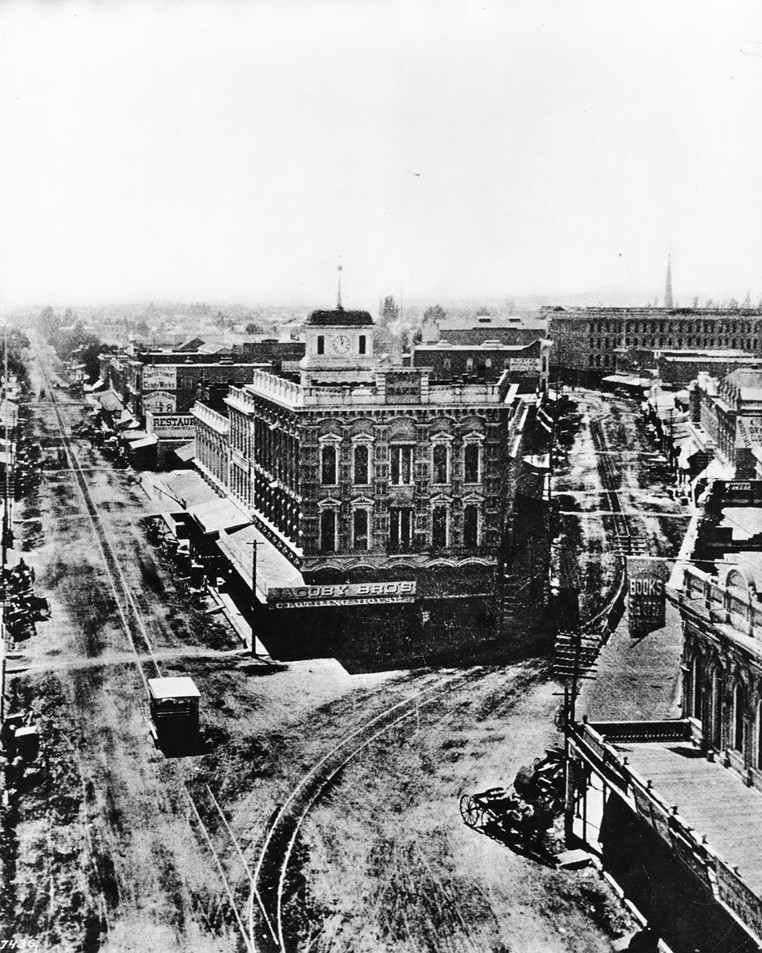
Temple Block c.1885. Courthouse clocktower visible immediately behind Temple Block. Main St. (l), Spring St. (r)

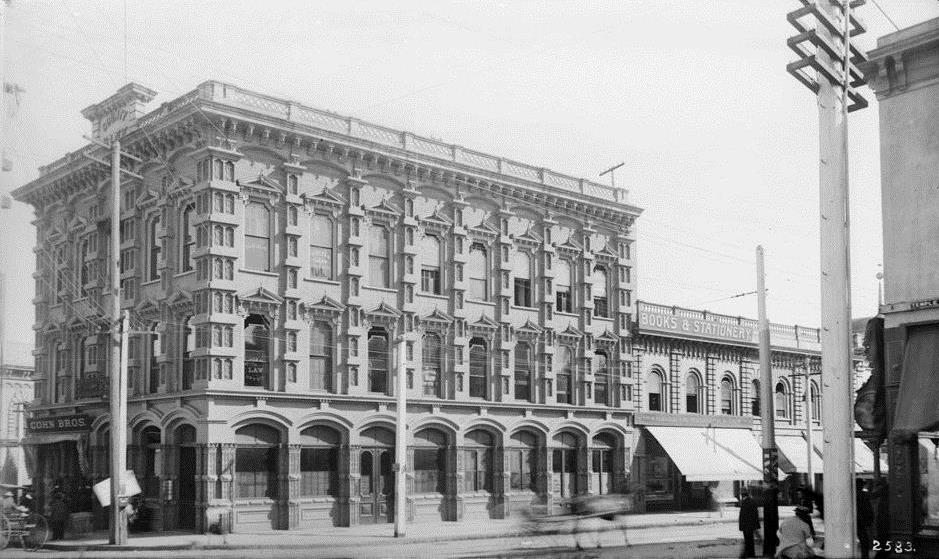
Spring St. side of Temple Block, sign for Cohn Bros. store, mid-1890s.

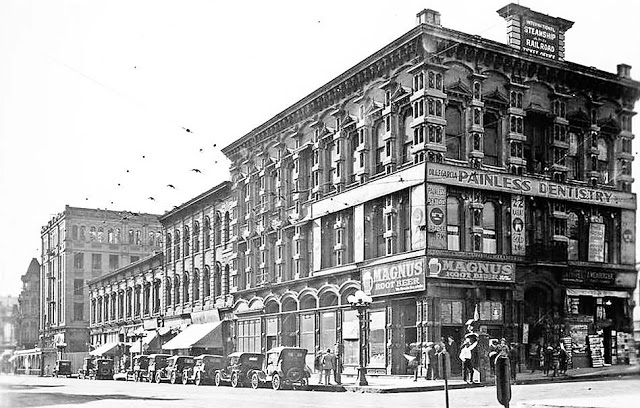
NE portion of Temple Block at SW corner of Temple (r) and Main (l), 1924

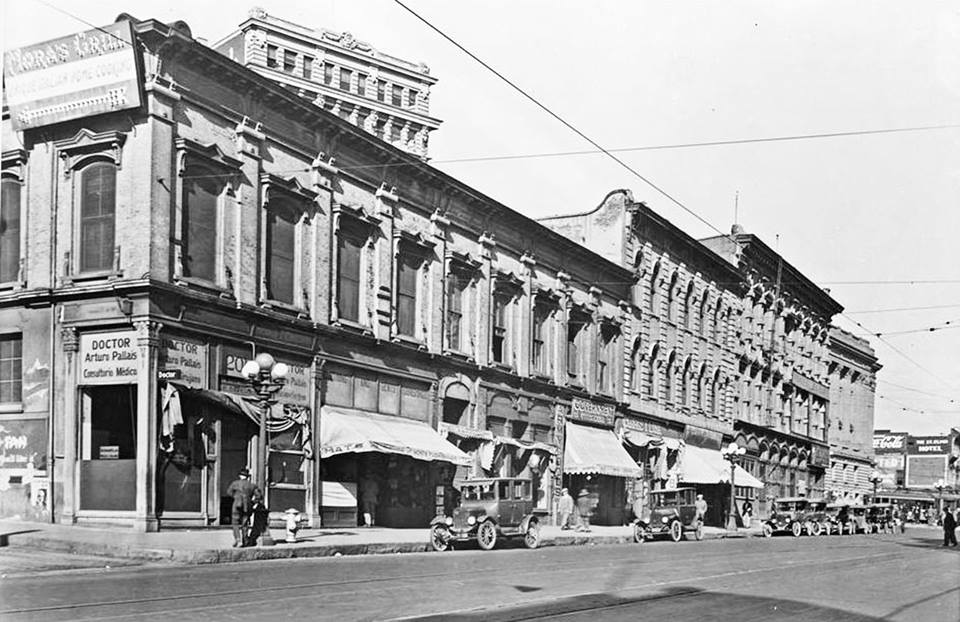
Eastern side of Temple Block, looking north along the west side of Main Street towards Temple St. (r), 1924

The triangular space where Spring and Main Streets came together at the south side of Temple Street was the site of Temple Block: actually a collection of different structures that occupied the block bounded by Spring, Main and Temple. The first or Old Temple Block built by Francisco (F. P. F.) Temple in 1856, was of adobe, two stories, facing north to Temple. This was incorporated into a later, expanded Temple Block in 1871, and then demolished. George P. McLain wrote that upon his arrival in the town in 1868, Temple Block had been the undisputed center of commerce and social life in the town. Even into the early 1880s, it was considered the city's most stately building. It housed many law offices, including those of Stephen M. White, Will D. Gould and Glassell, Chapman and Smith. The block had a key role in the retail history of Los Angeles, as it was the first home to several upscale retailers who would become big names in the city: Desmond's (1870–1882) and Jacoby Bros. (1879–1891). It was also home to the Odd Fellows, the Fashion Saloon, the Temple and Workman Bank, Slotterbeck's gun shop, the Wells Fargo office. The northeast corner was home to Adolph Portugal's dry goods store (1874-1879?), Jacoby Bros. (1879–1891) and Cohn Bros. (1892–1897), in succession.

In 1925-7 this block and other surrounding areas were demolished to make way for the current Los Angeles City Hall.

Along the south side of Temple Block was Market Street, a small street running between Spring and Main.

===== Clocktower Courthouse/Bullard Block =====
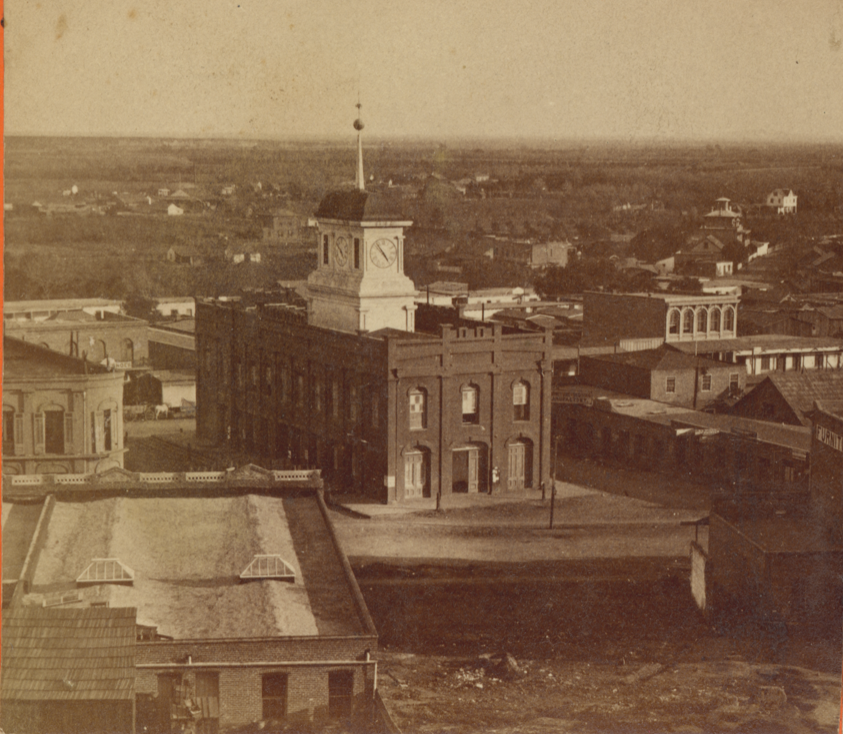
Clocktower Courthouse viewed from Fort Hill (from the west)

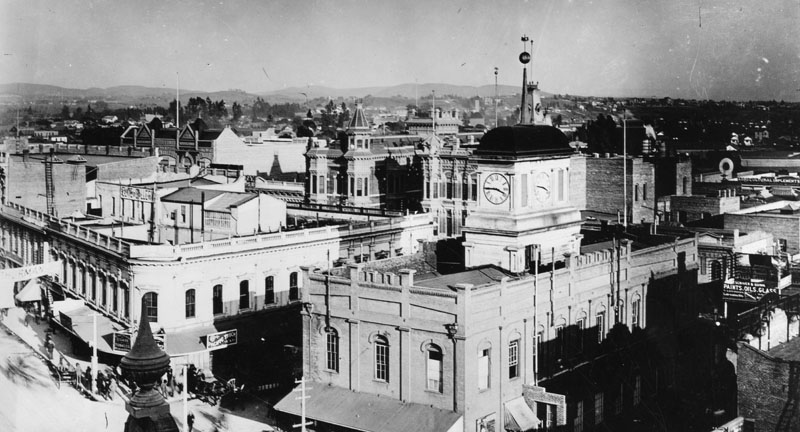
View from Spring St. of Clocktower Courthouse (r), southside of Temple Block (l), United States Hotel (back)

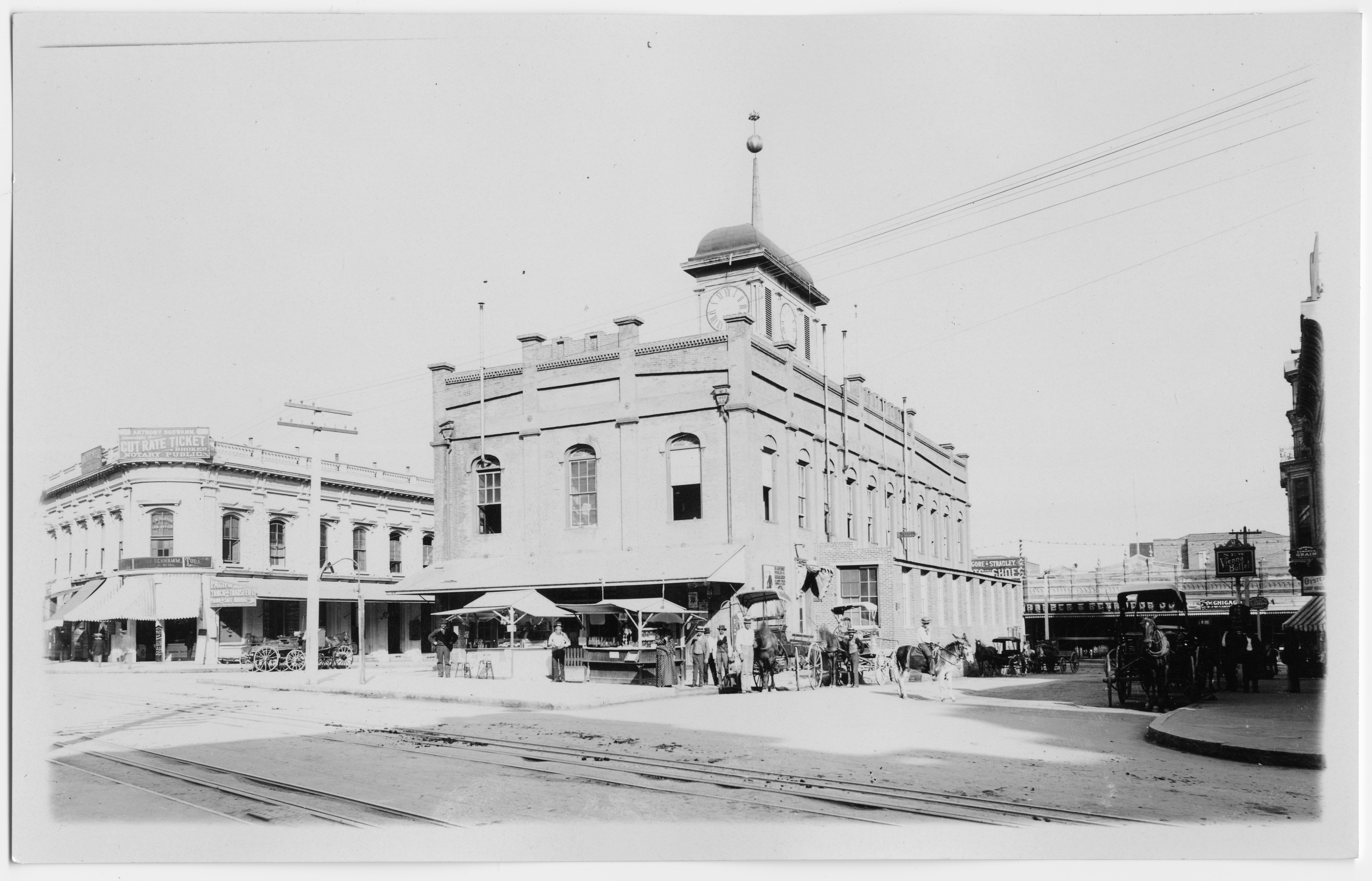
Clocktower (Temple) Courthouse, Market and Theater

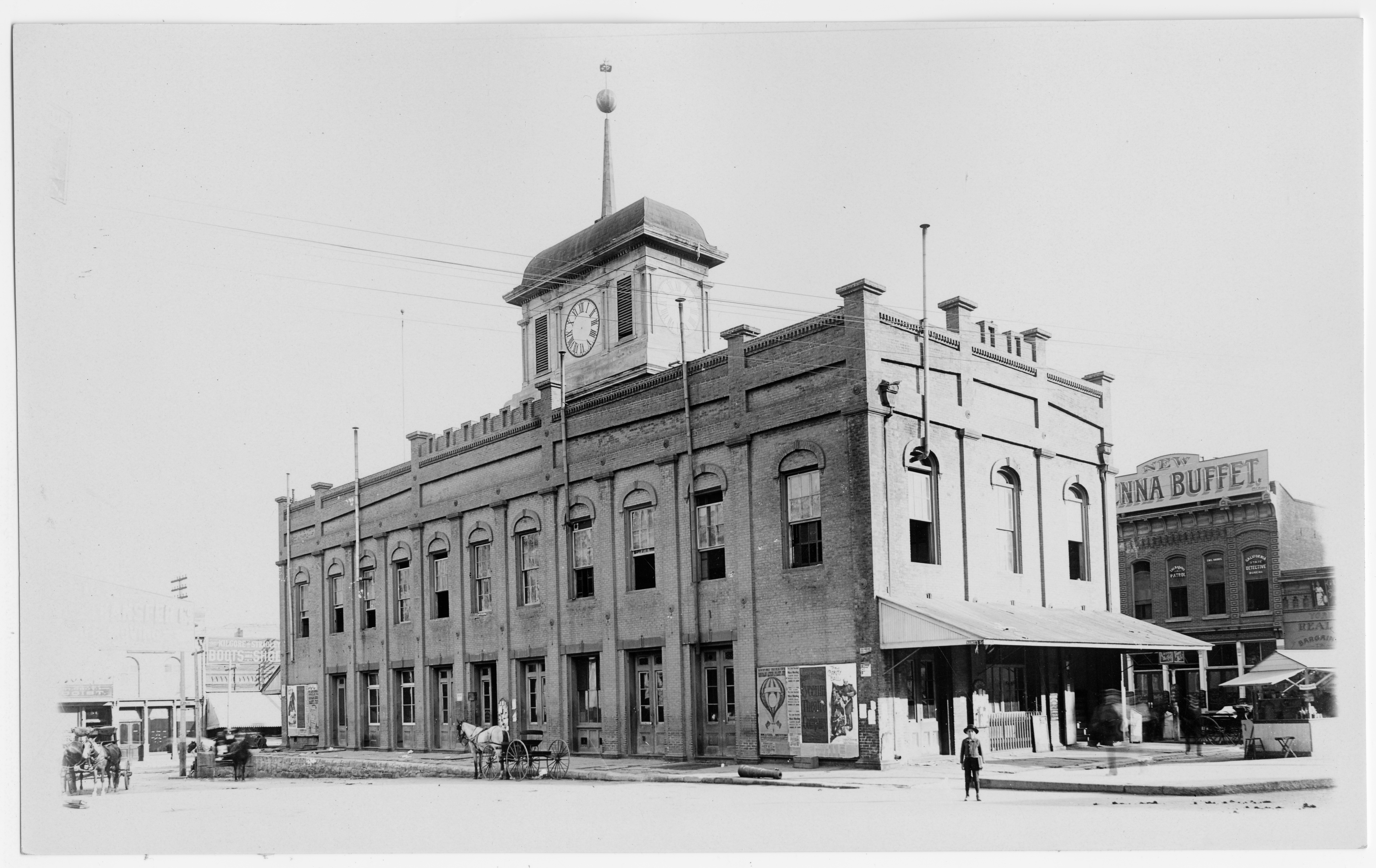
Clocktower Courthouse, view from Spring St. looking SE, with the Vienna Buffet on Court St. visible

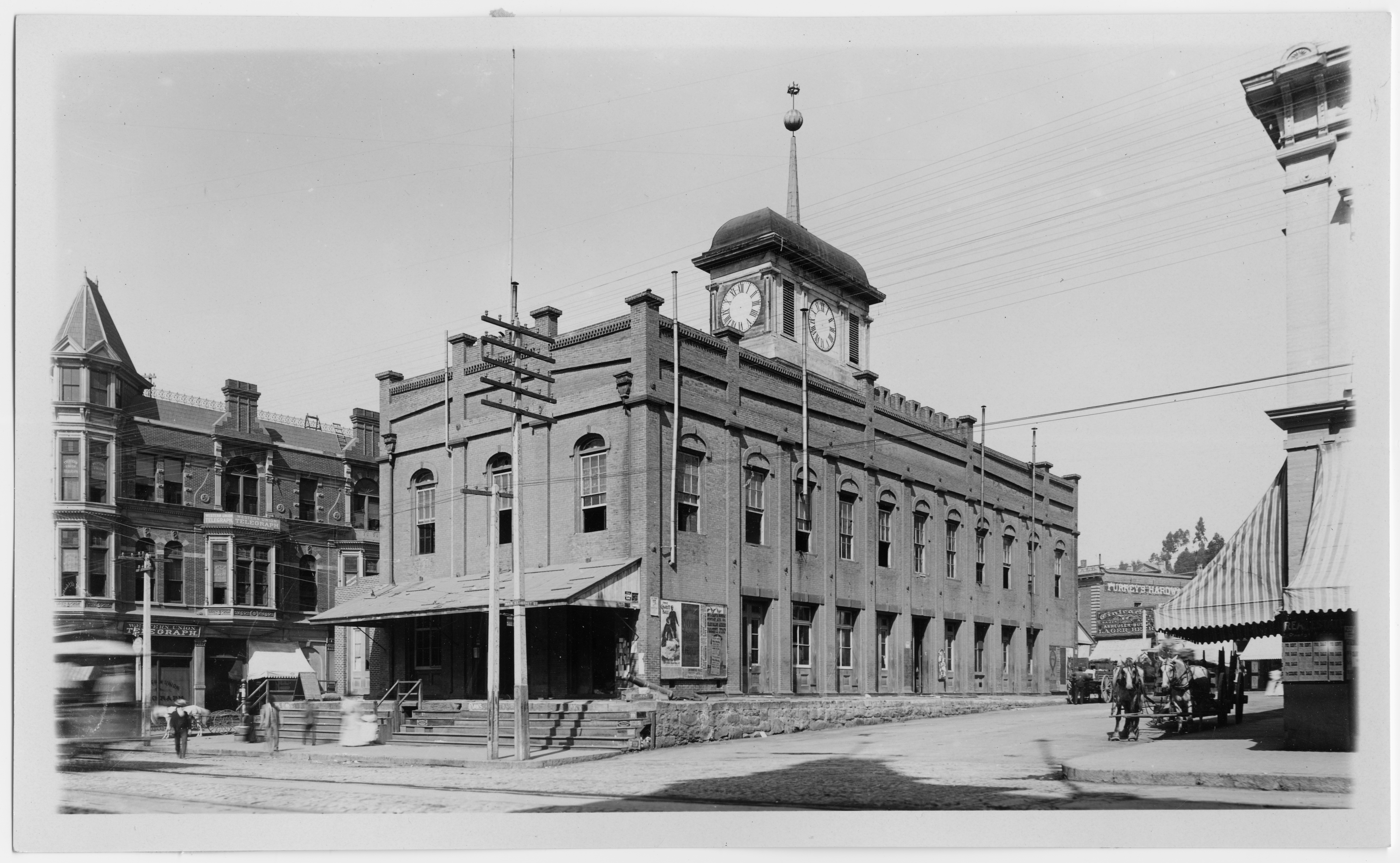
Clocktower Courthouse

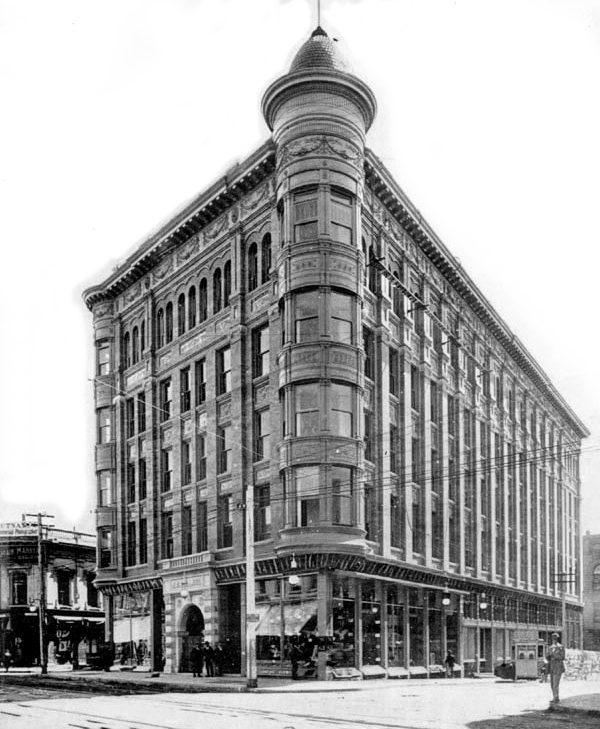
Bullard Block c.1900. It replaced the Clocktower Courthouse in 1895.

Taking up the small block immediately south of Temple Block between Market and Court streets, facing both Spring and Main streets, were two buildings in succession:

  - Clock Tower Courthouse: Just south of Temple Block across tiny Market Street was a building known by many names including Temple Courthouse, Temple Market, Temple Theater, Old County Courthouse, etc. Also built by John Temple, in 1858, originally as a market (ground floor) and theater (upper floor). Demolished 1890s. Served as a market and retail as well as the County Courthouse 1861-1891 until the Red Sand Courthouse was finished. Topped by a rectangular tower with a clock on all four sides. The Clock Tower Courthouse was demolished in 1895 and replaced by:
  - Bullard Block, built in 1895-6, architects Morgan & Walls, 154–160 N. Spring, NE corner of Court Street. Replaced the Clocktower Courthouse. Housed The Hub Clothing Co., a large department store for apparel. See also the photo below of "La Fiesta". Demolished 1925-6 to make way for current Los Angeles City Hall.

===== Court south to First =====
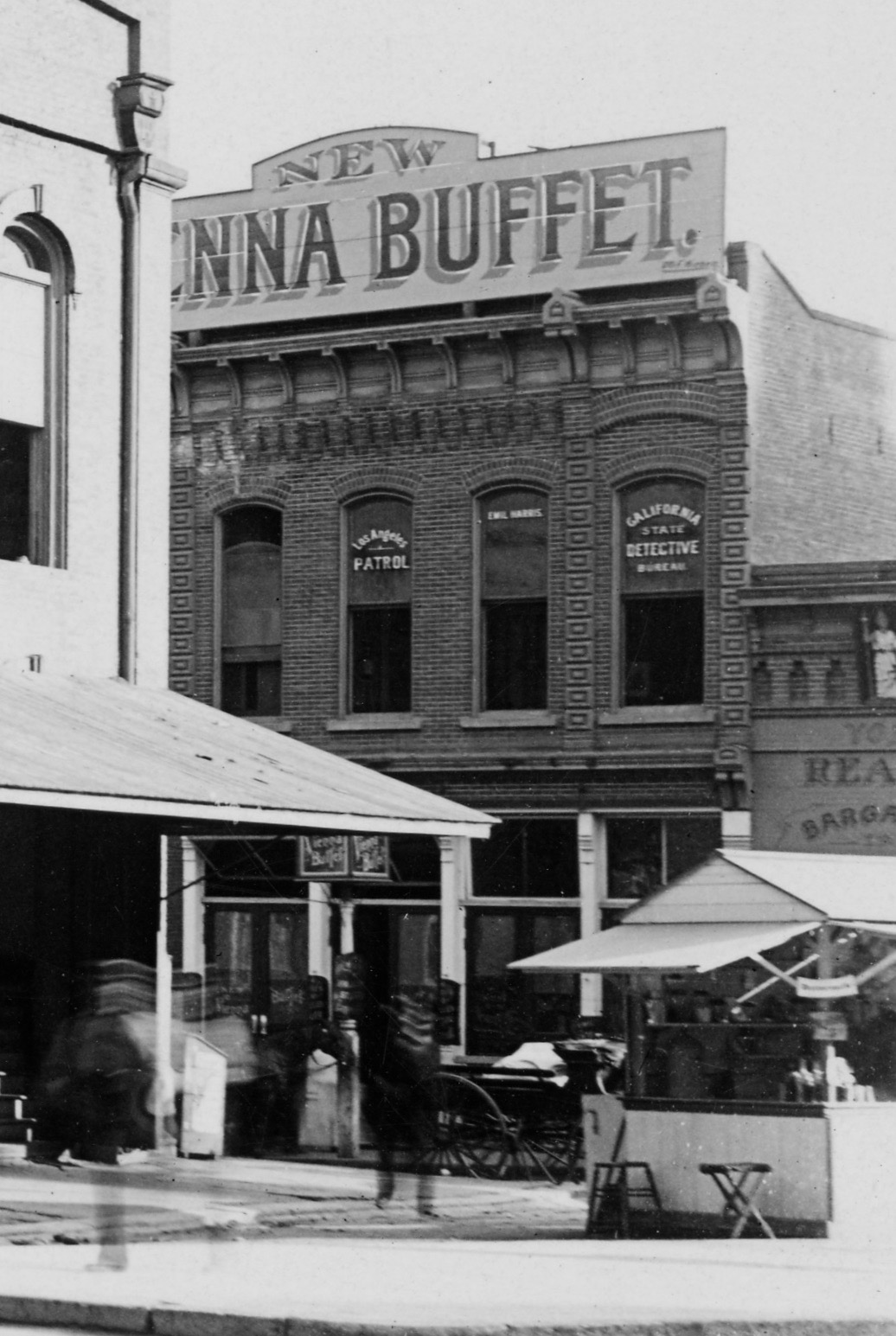
Vienna Buffet, which played a role in the city's LGBTQ history, seen sometime between 1891–1902

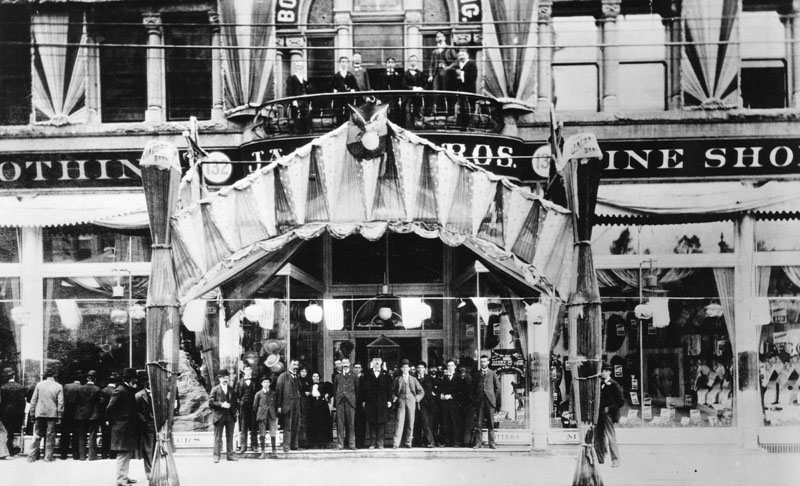
The "palatial" Jacoby Bros. store, 128–134 N. Spring Street, around 1896
- Court Street, a small street running between Spring and Main. At 12-14-16 Court Street (pre-1890 numbering). 112–116 Court St. (post 1890 numbering) was the Tivoli Theatre which opened and closed in 1890. From 1891 through 1902, the venue was the (New) Vienna Buffet, a restaurant with live music where scandal occurred, and gatherings of gay men including what were then called "she boys". Then from 1902–c.1910, the site was the Cineograph Theatre, a vaudeville venue. From 1918–1925 it was marked the Chinese Theatre with the Sun Jung Wah Co. performing Chinese plays.
- H. Jevne & Co. grocers were located at 38–40 (after 1890: 136-138) N. Spring (the older "Wilcox Block", also known as the Strelitz Block) from 1890-1896 before moving to the Wilcox Building when it opened at 2nd and Spring.
- Jacoby Bros. dry goods store was located at 128–134 N. Spring St. from 1891-1900, and added the Jevne premises in 1896 (thus encompassing all of 128 through 138 N. Spring). The store moved to Broadway south of 3rd St. in 1900, another signal that the upscale shopping district was moving southwest away from this area at that time.

=== First and Spring ===
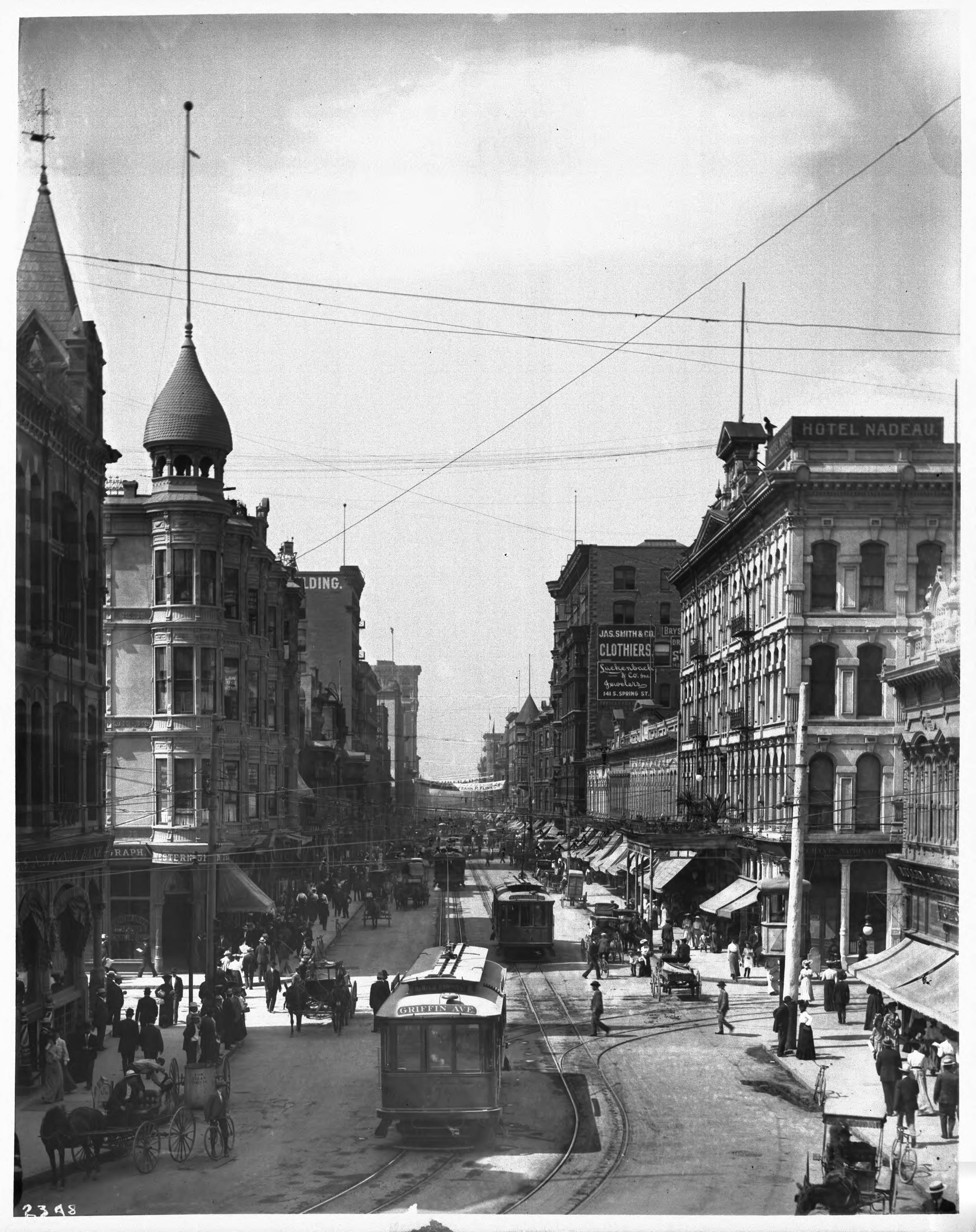

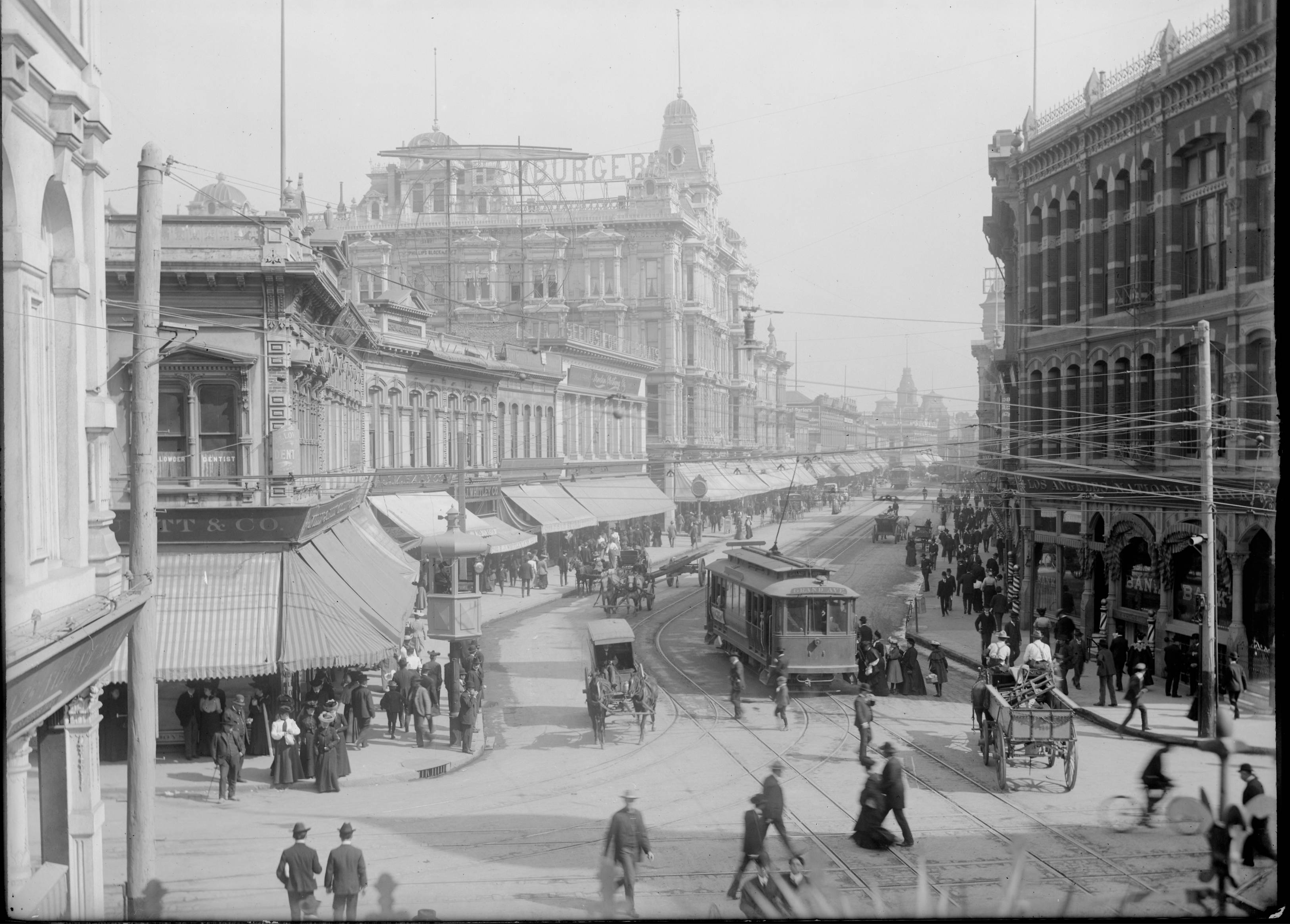
View north on Spring St. from First Street. Los Angeles National Bank building in foreground, right. Larronde Block in foreground, left. Phillips Block visible in background. Note the electric streetcar to Grand Ave.

The image at above left looks south past the intersection of First and Spring sometime around 1900–1906. The spire of the Wilson Block is prominent on the left, as is the Nadeau Hotel on the right. In the foreground we can see the Los Angeles National Bank to the left and the Larronde Block to the right. From First to Second streets, Spring Street is still a busy shopping district, though Broadway is also just becoming popular for more upscale shopping. An electric streetcar heads to Griffin Avenue in Montecito Heights, on what would become Line 2 of the Los Angeles Railway. Today, this view would be of the 2009 LAPD Headquarters taking up the entire block on the left and on the right, the 1935 Los Angeles Times Building, and behind it, the 1948 Crawford Mirror Addition building.

==== Northwest corner of First and Spring ====
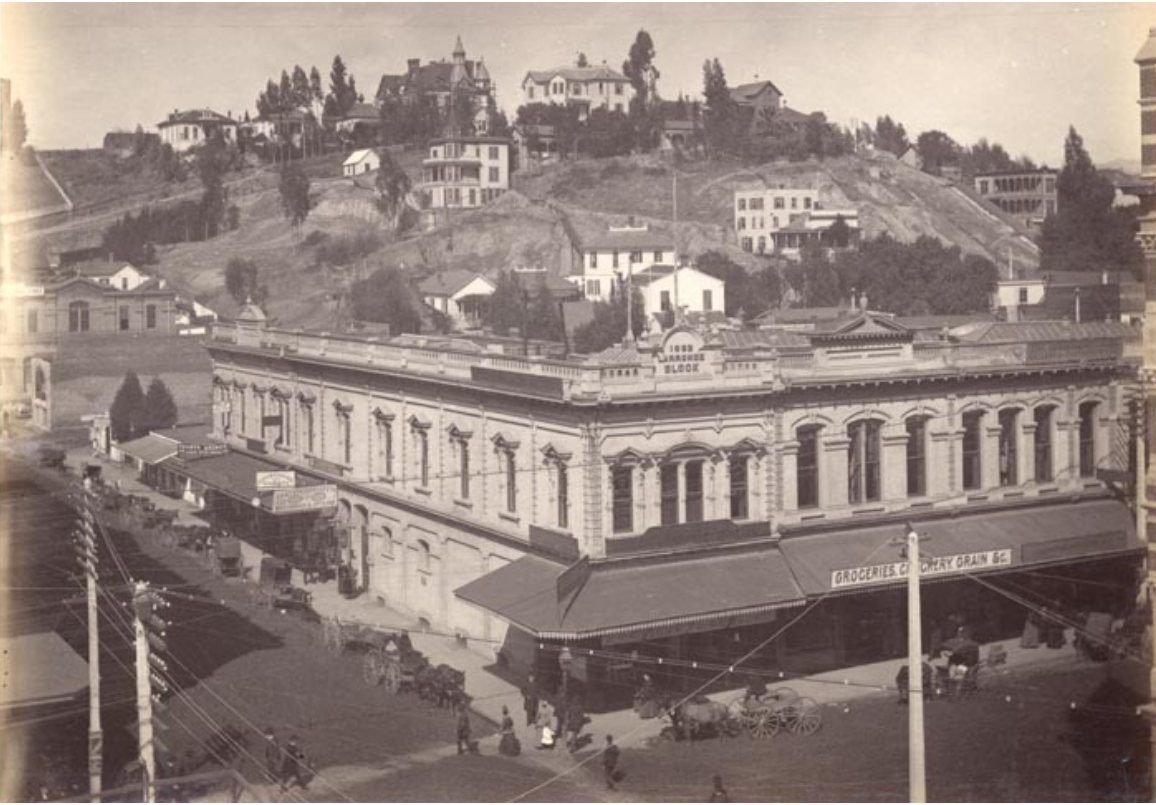
Larronde Block in 1898. Photo by I. W. Taber

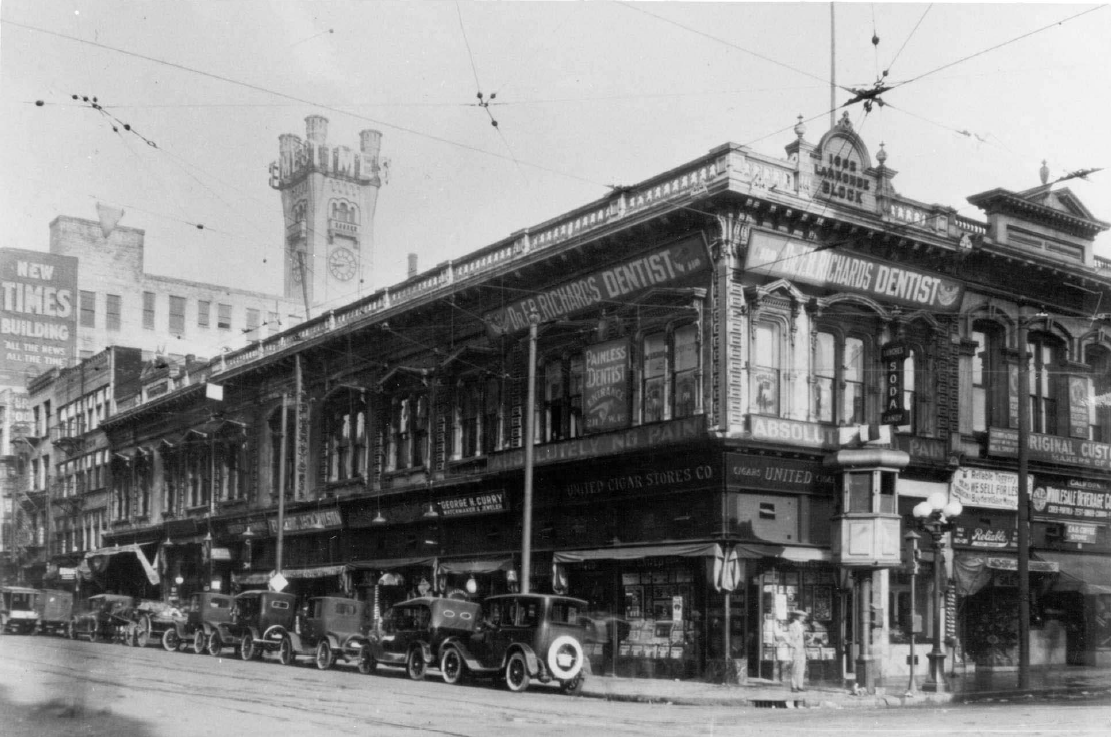
Larronde Block, undated photo, probably 1910s

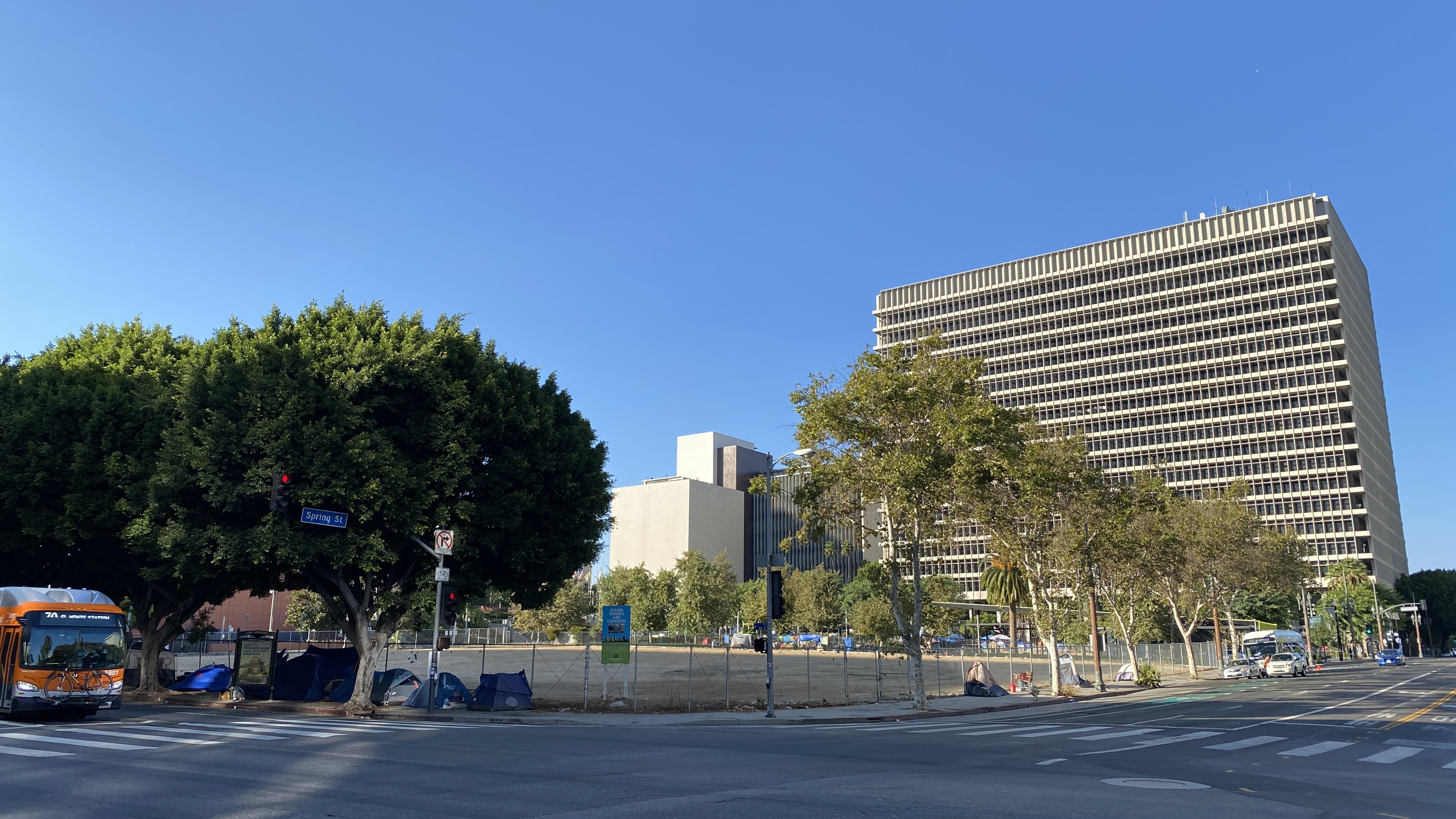
NW corner of 1st/Spring, 2020, an empty lot. Back right: County Courthouse (1972)
- Larronde Block, built in 1882 at a cost of $10,000, 211 W. 1st St., also 101–105 N. Spring, two stories, offices and retail shops, including:
  - Mullen & Bluett, a major clothing store, 101–105 N. Spring, from its founding in 1889 through 1910.
- California State Building (completed 1931, opened 1932, architect John C. Austin, 1931, demolished 1976).
- The lot is currently vacant

==== Northeast corner of First and Spring ====
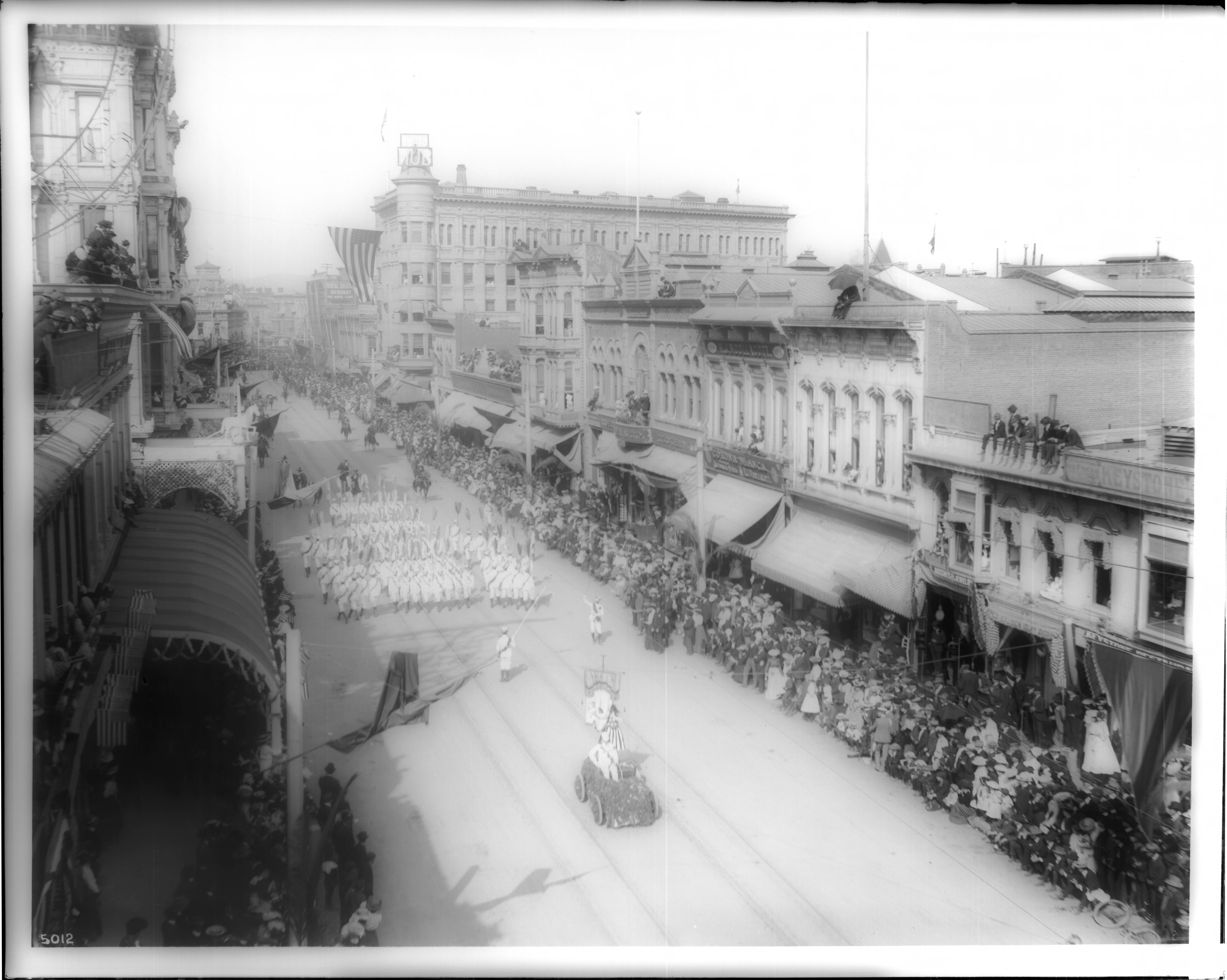
The east side of Spring Street, north of First, during the Fiesta de Los Angeles in 1903. The Bullard Block is in the distance at the top, center left.

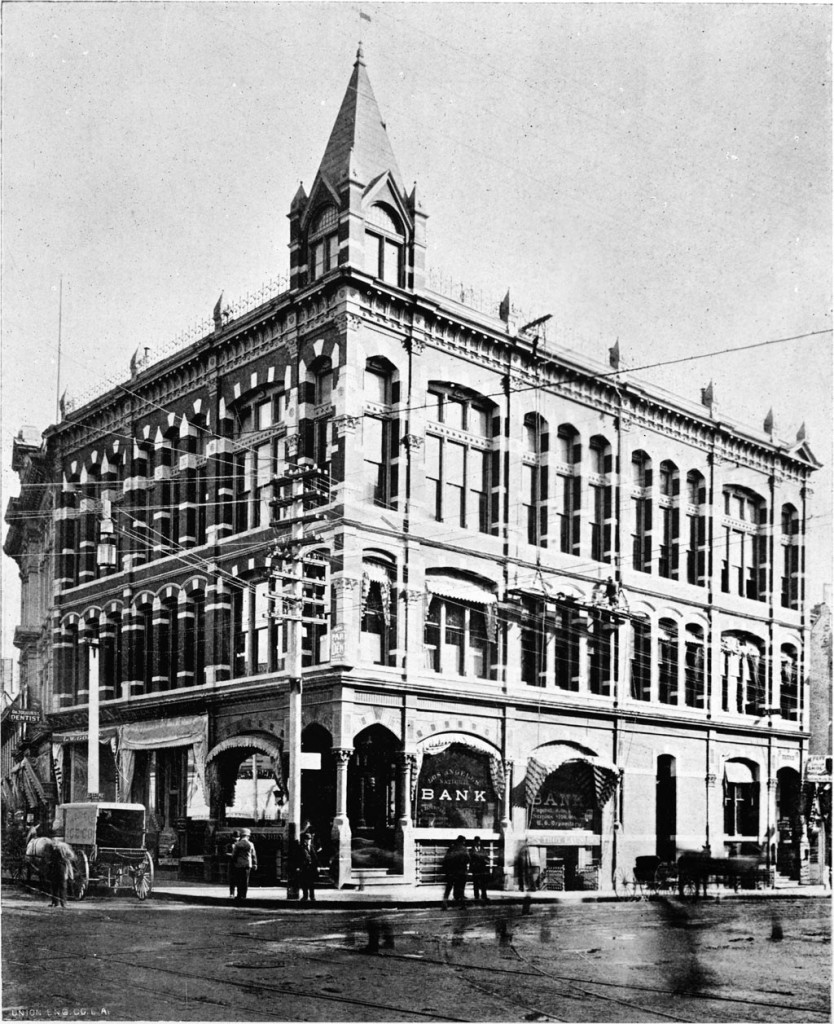
Los Angeles National Bank Building

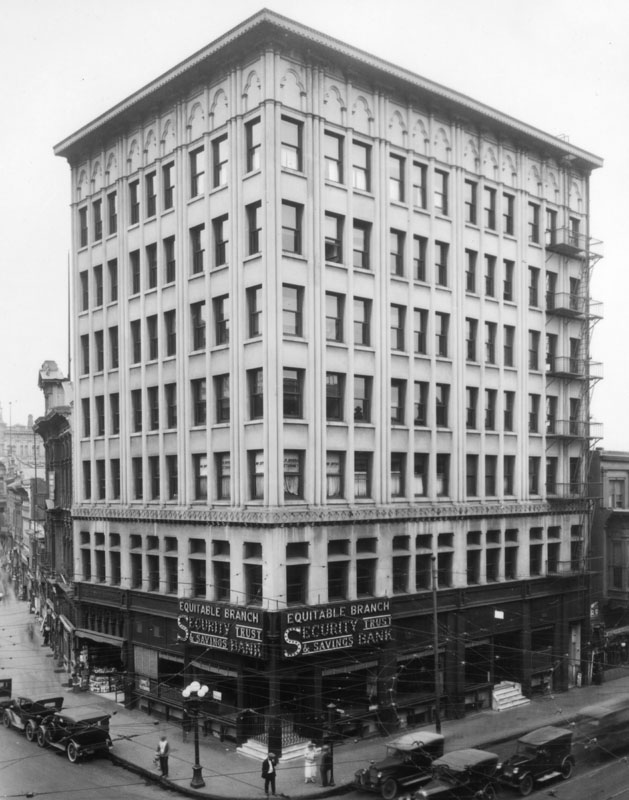
Equitable Savings Bank Building

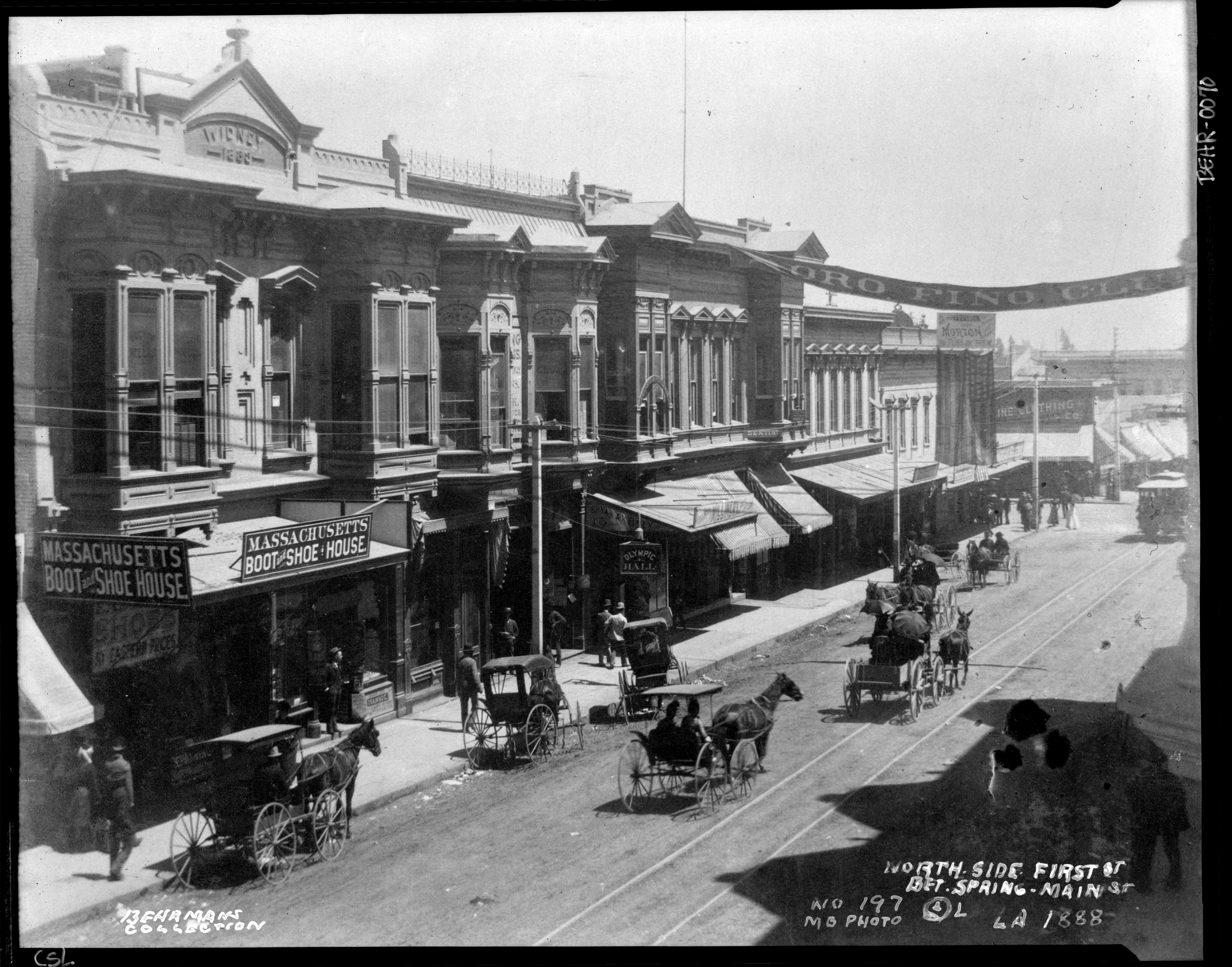
North side of First Street between Spring and Main streets. Widney Block. c.1888
- Los Angeles National Bank Building (1887-1906), demolished and replaced by the
- Equitable Building (Equitable Savings Bank, 1906-1920s)

==== First Street from Spring to Main ====
First Street east of Spring: Widney Block (i.e. Joseph Widney), built in 1883, along the north side. The main Olmsted & Wales bookstore was located in the block in the mid-1880s.

==== Southwest corner of First and Spring ====
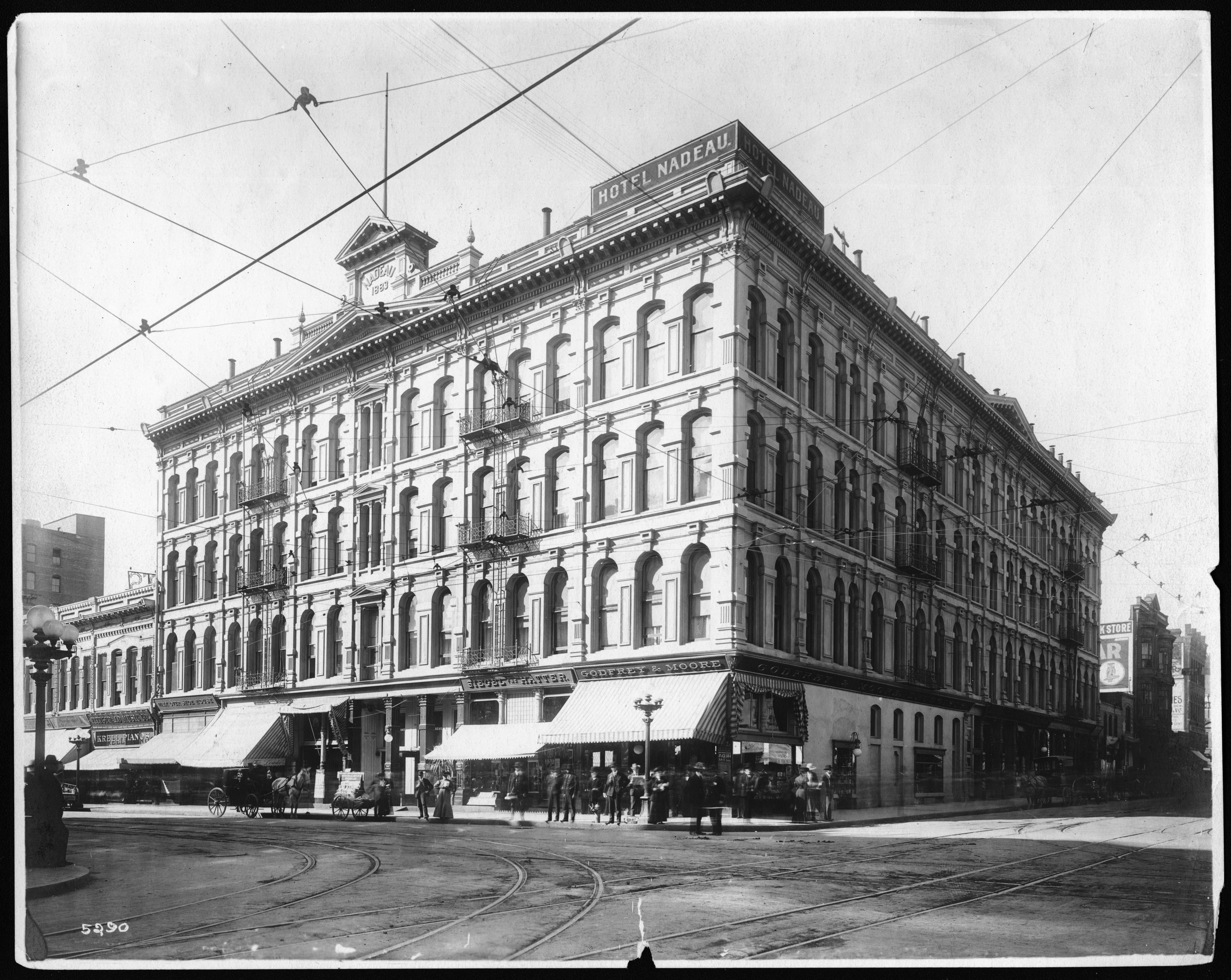
Nadeau Block housing the Nadeau Hotel (1882–1932)

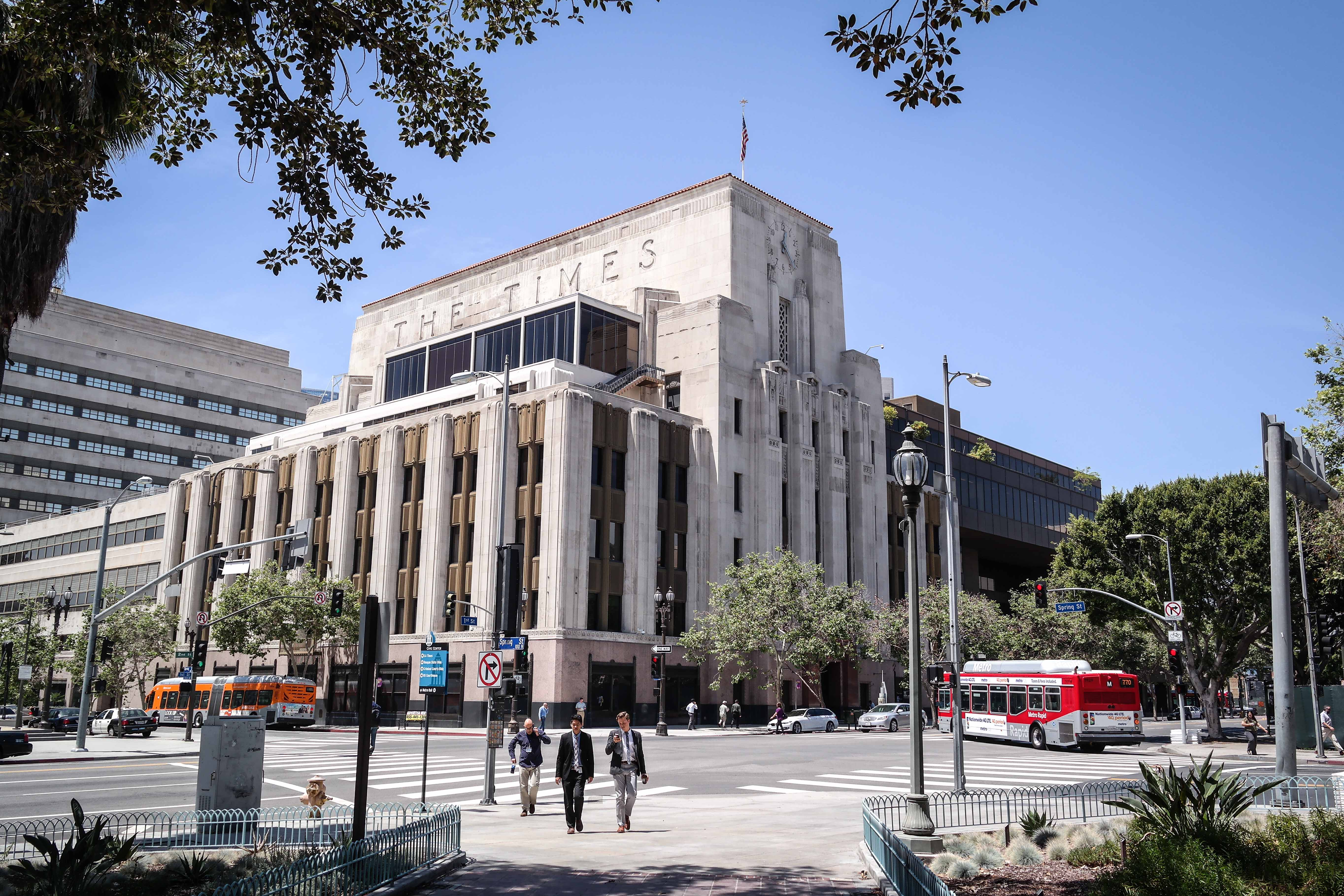
L.A. Times Building, opened 1935, view in 2006.
- Nadeau Block or Nadeau Hotel, built 1881-2, demolished 1932, designed by architects Kysor & Morgan, located at the southwest corner of Spring and First streets. It was the first four-story building in the city.
- This corner is now the site of the Los Angeles Times Building, opened 1935, part of the Times Mirror Square complex taking up the entire block between Spring, Broadway, First and Second streets, formerly the headquarters of the Los Angeles Times, currently vacant.

==== Southeast corner of First and Spring ====
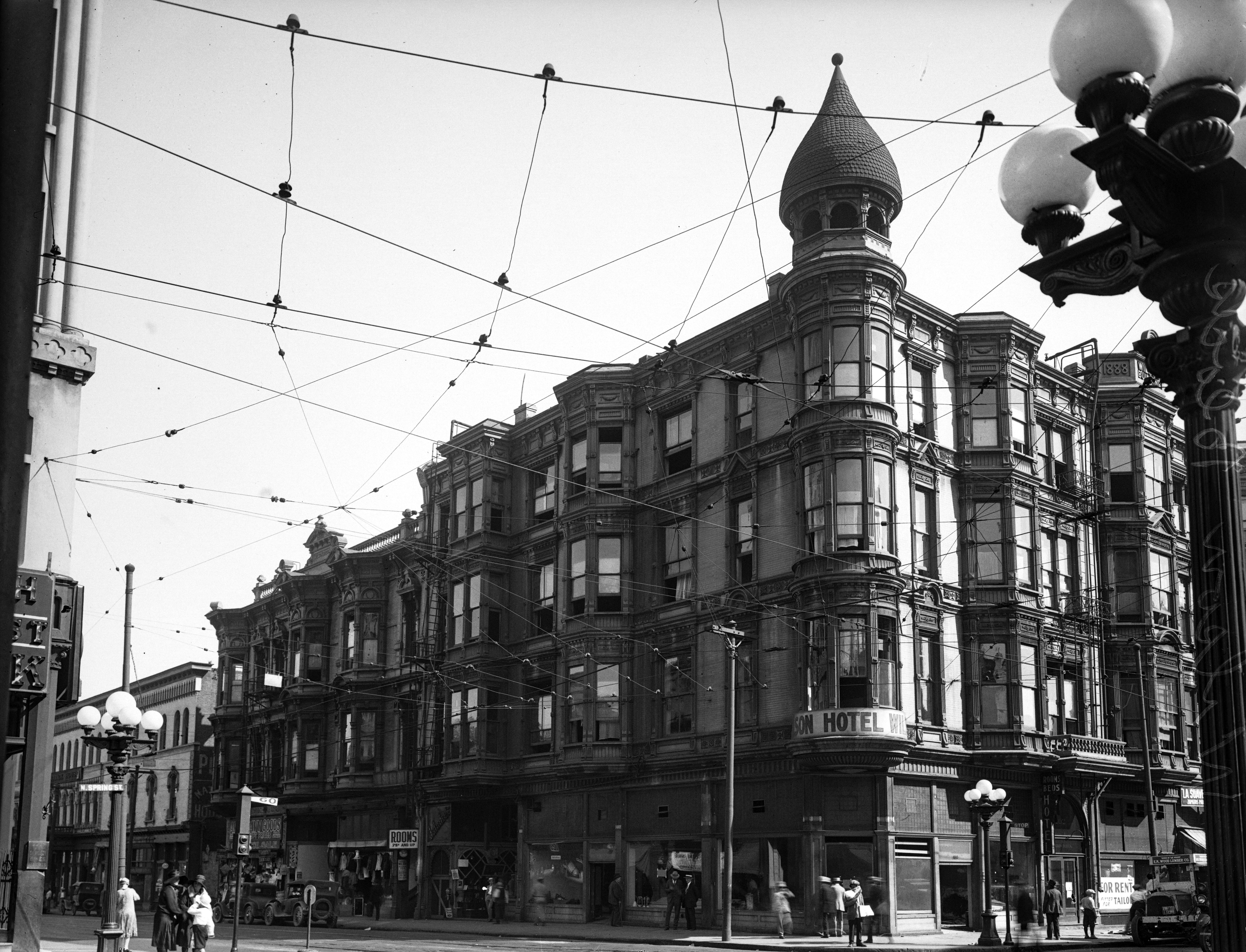
Wilson Block in 1920

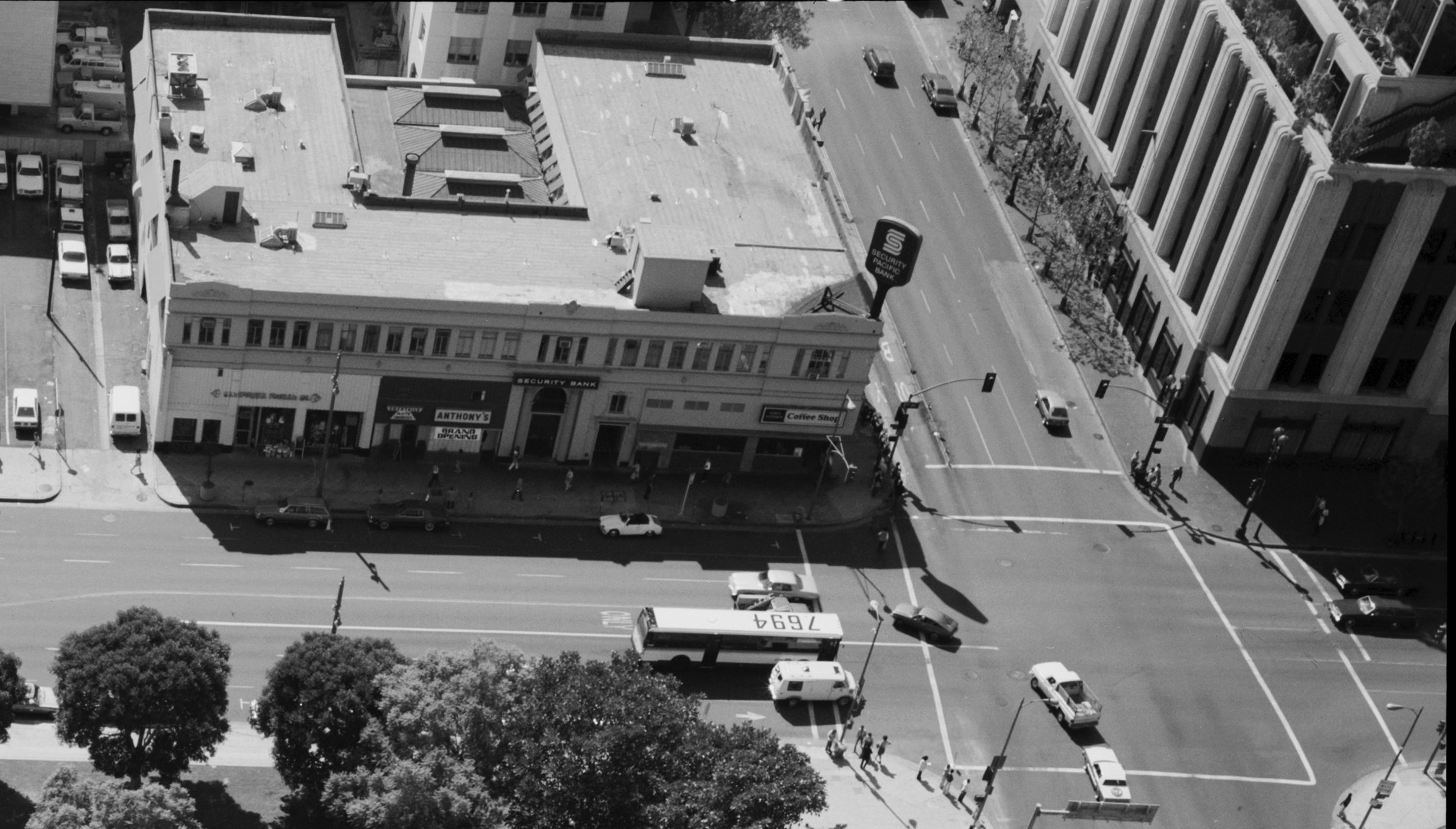
The c.1927 two -story commercial block with the Security Pacific branch, seen from the City Hall tower

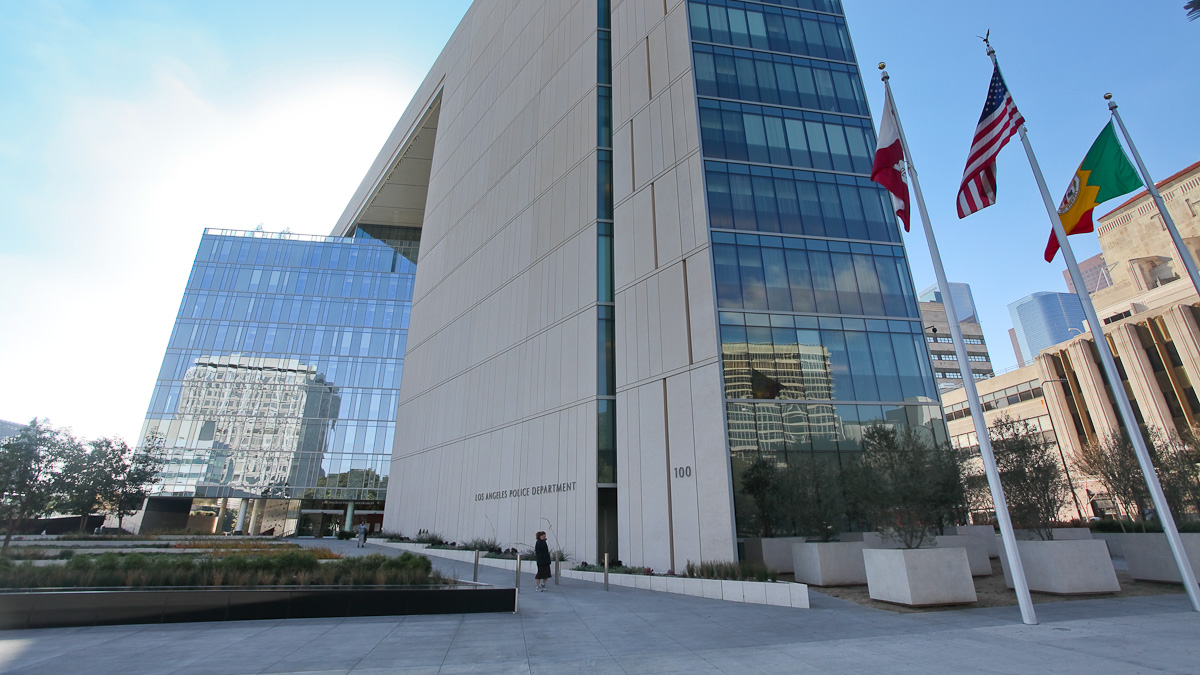
The 2009 L.A.P.D. Headquarters Building

Four buildings have stood here in succession:

- The George S. Wilson homestead
- Wilson Block, sometimes called the city's first skyscraper. Built 1886-8. Demolished around 1927. The corner is now occupied by the Los Angeles Police Department Headquarters Building, completed in 2009. The site is now home to:
- A replacement two-story retail building, home to the "Equitable" branch of Security Pacific National Bank, then the Security Trust and Savings Bank. (the Equitable Building was across the street to the north).
- Since 2009, the Police Headquarters Building taking up the entire block between First, Second, Spring and Main streets.

=== Second and Spring ===
==== Northwest corner of Second and Spring ====
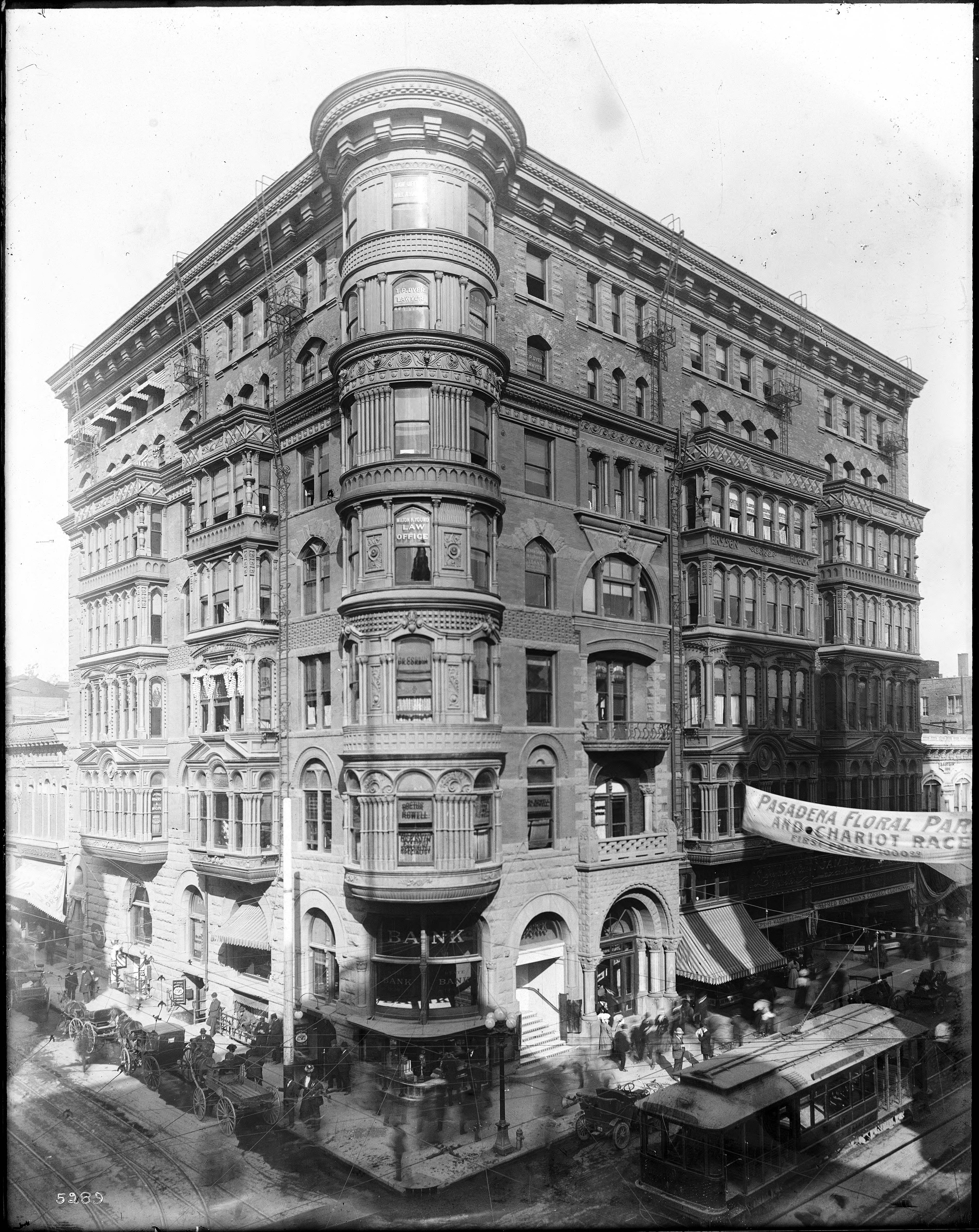
Bryson or Bryson-Bonebrake Block or Building erected 1886-8, photo 1905

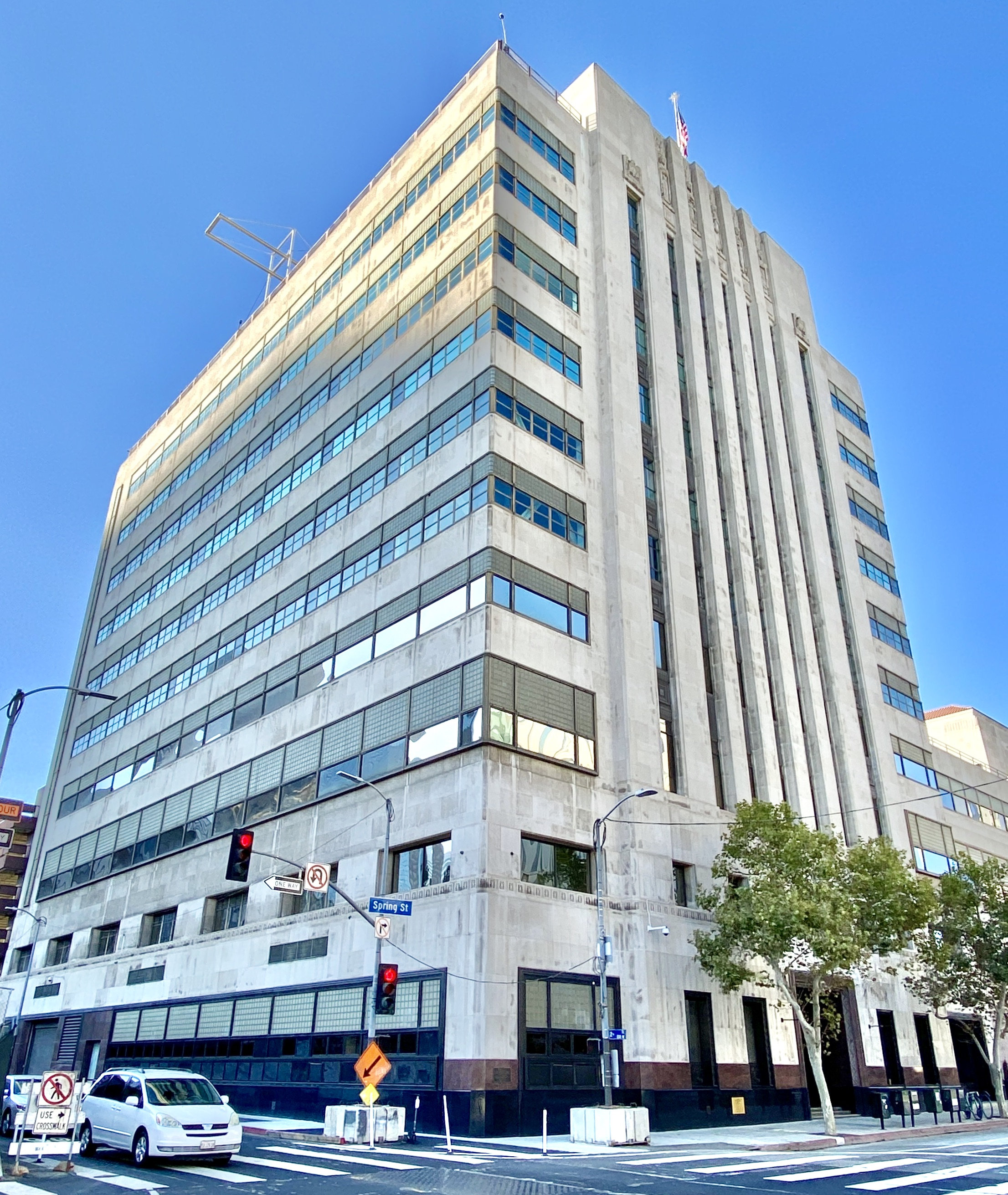
The 1948 "Crawford Addition" building at Times Mirror Square, NW corner of 2nd & Spring, September 2020
- The Bryson Block, also known as the Bryson-Bonebrake Block or Bryson Bonebrake Building, northwest corner 2nd and Spring, constructed 1886-1888 for $224,000 on the site of a public school and an early city hall, as a 126-room bank and office building. Romanesque architecture. Two stories added 1902-1904. Demolished 1934. Architect Joseph Cather Newsom (Newsom & Newsom). Pacific Coast Architecture Database states it was "nothing short of amazing, displaying a riotous and eclectic amalgam of features". Built for mayor John Bryson and Major George H. Bonebrake, President of the Los Angeles National Bank and the State Loan & Trust Co. Desmond's department store was located here from 1890 to 1900.

It was replaced by the 1948 Crawford Addition building, part of the Times Mirror Square complex, currently vacant.

==== Northeast corner of Second and Spring ====
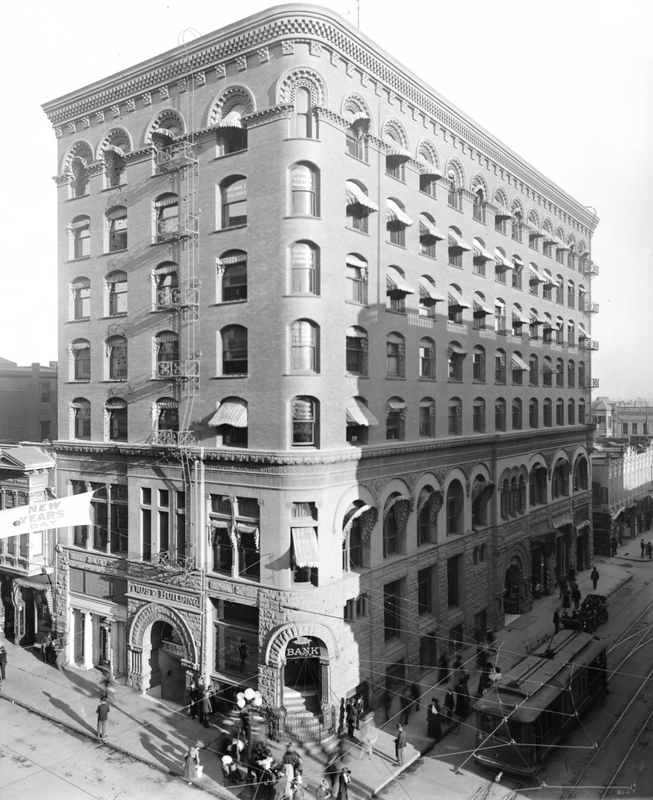
1902 photo of the Burdick Block, on the NE corner of 2nd & Spring, built 1888; top floors added 1900.

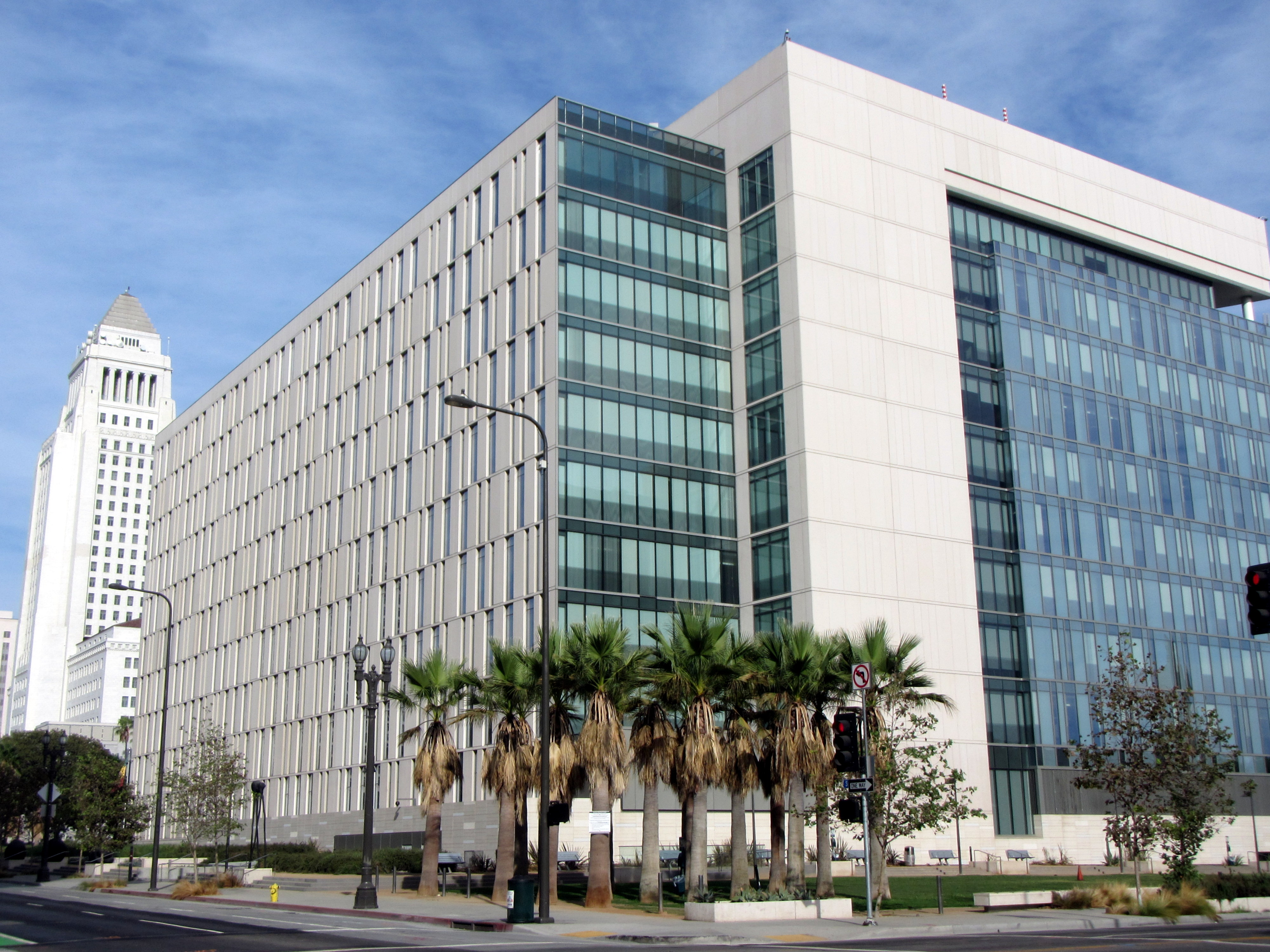
L.A.P.D. Headquarters, opened 2012, NE corner of 2nd & Spring.
- Burdick Block, a.k.a. the Trust Building, 127 W. 2nd St., 1888 (J. N. Preston & Son), top stories added 1900 (John Parkinson). In 1910, refitted and rechristened the American Bank Building. Now site of the Los Angeles Police Department Headquarters which occupies the entire block from First to Second and from Spring to Main, completed 2009.

==== Southwest corner of Second and Spring ====
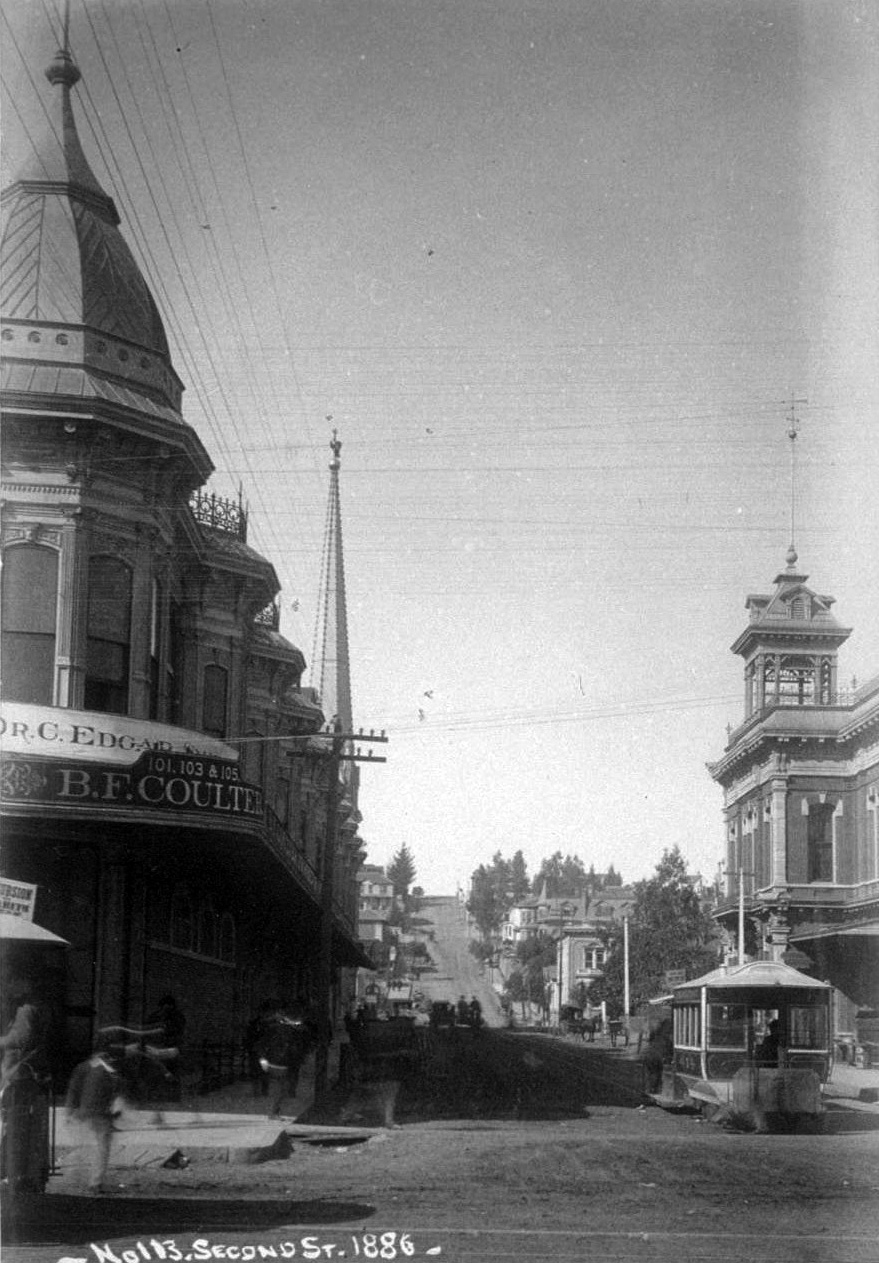
View west on 2nd at Spring. Hollenbeck Block (left) when it was only two stories, note Coulter's store; 2nd City Hall (right), 1886

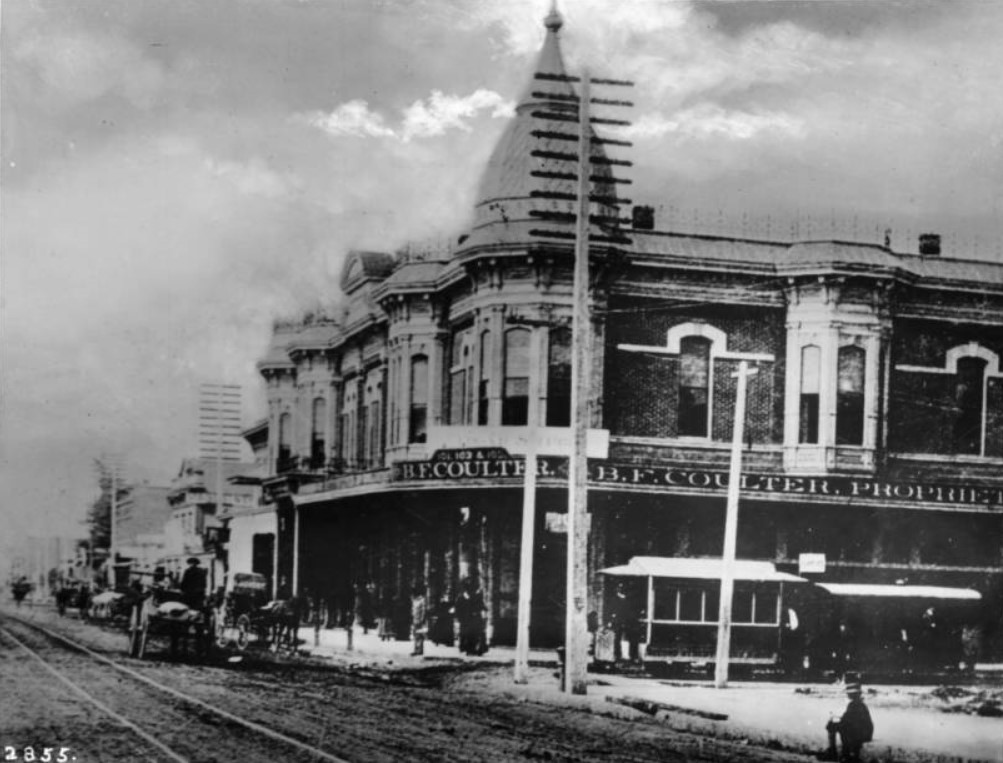
View south on Spring at 2nd, Hollenbeck Block when it was two stories, Coulter's store, 1886

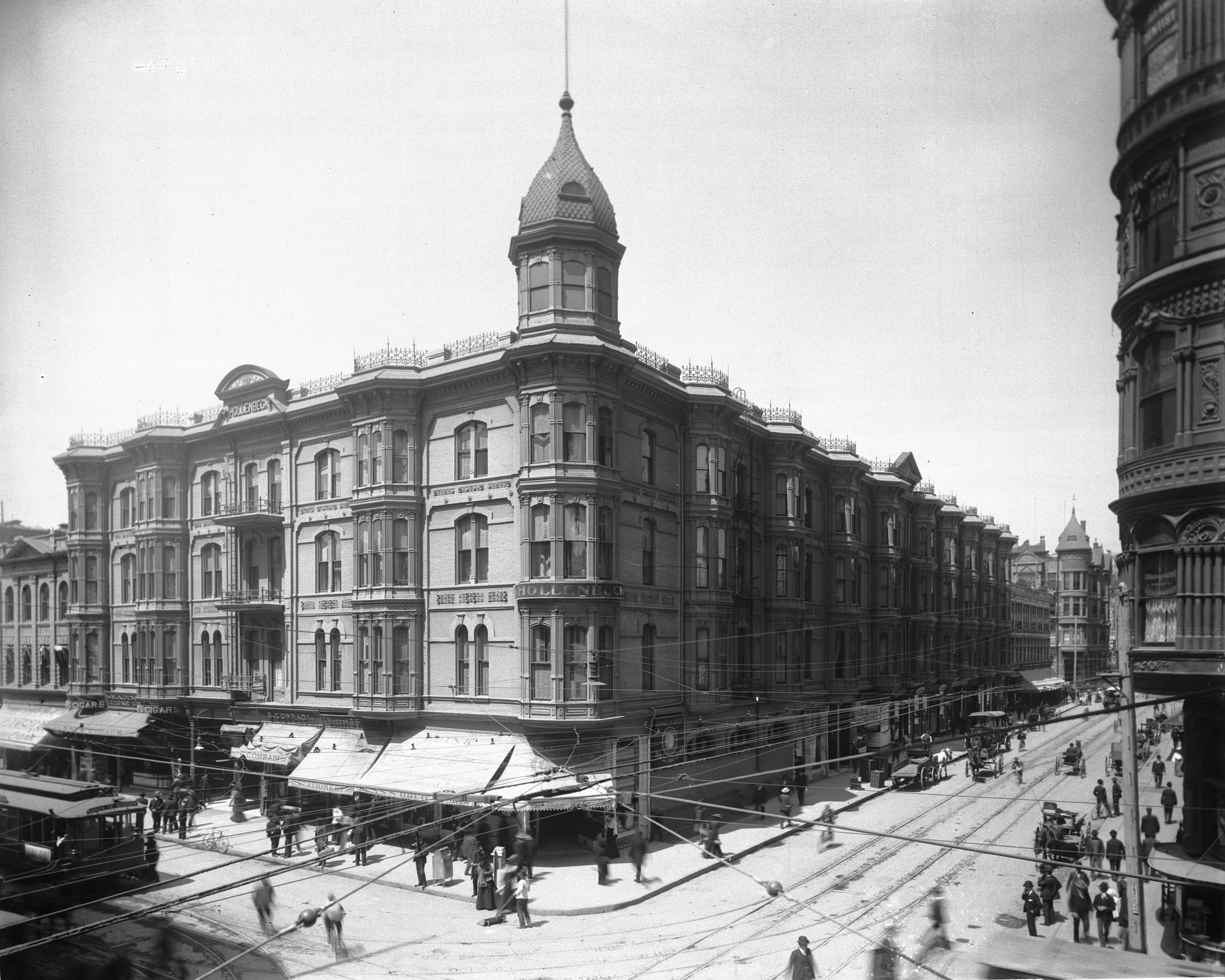
Hollenbeck Block (1884-1933), SW corner of 2nd & Spring. c.1900-1905.

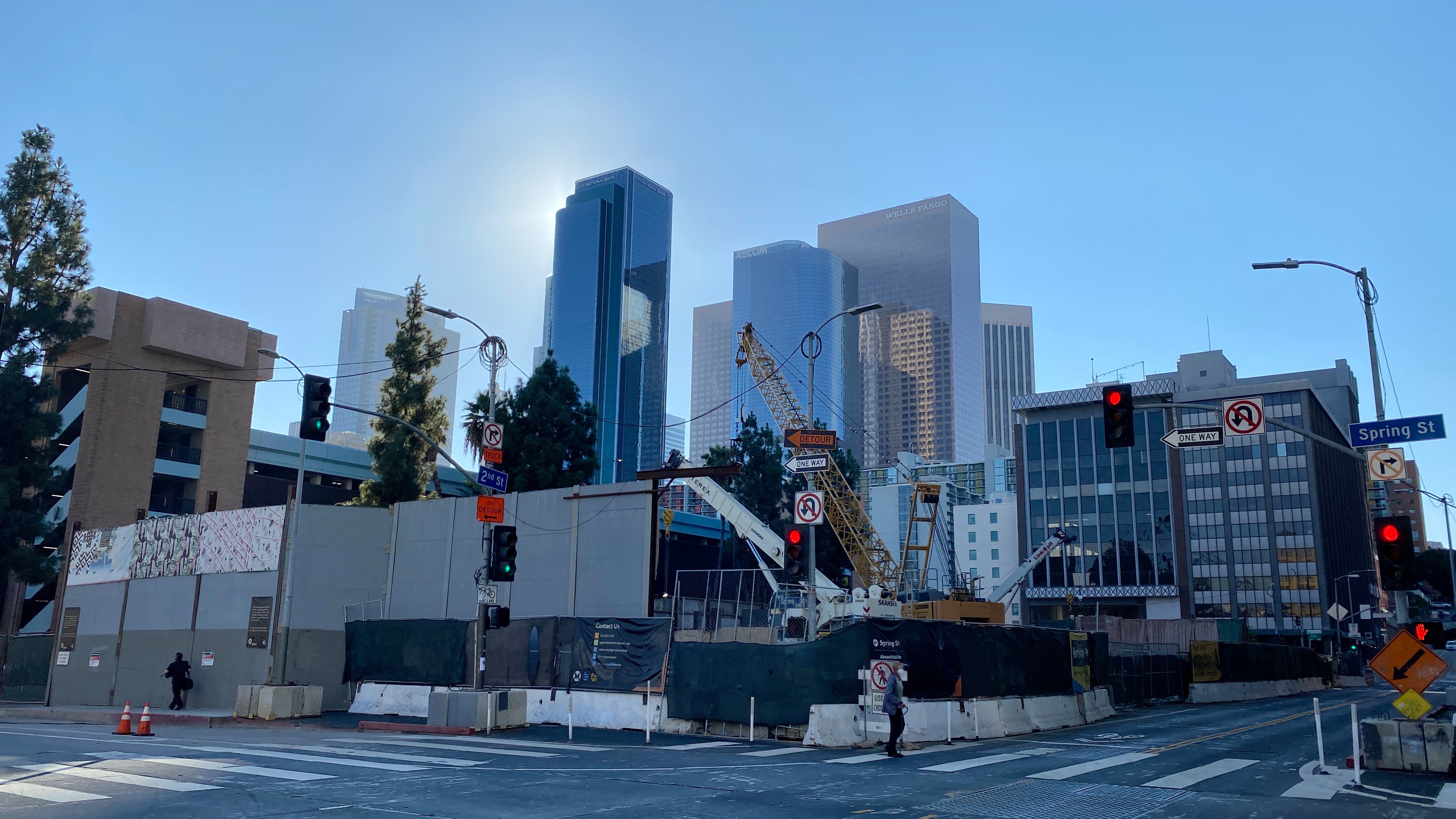
Historic Broadway station under construction, September 2020

- The Hollenbeck Block was located on the southwest corner of Spring and Second streets. It was built in 1884 by John Edward Hollenbeck and housed the Hollenbeck Hotel and, on the corner, from 1884–1898, Coulter's 6,000 sq ft (560 m^{2}) store, which would become a leading Los Angeles department store. Built 1884, demolished in 1933. Architect Robert Brown Young. Currently the construction site of Historic Broadway station, an underground station of the Los Angeles Metro Rail light rail subway.

==== Southeast corner of Second and Spring ====
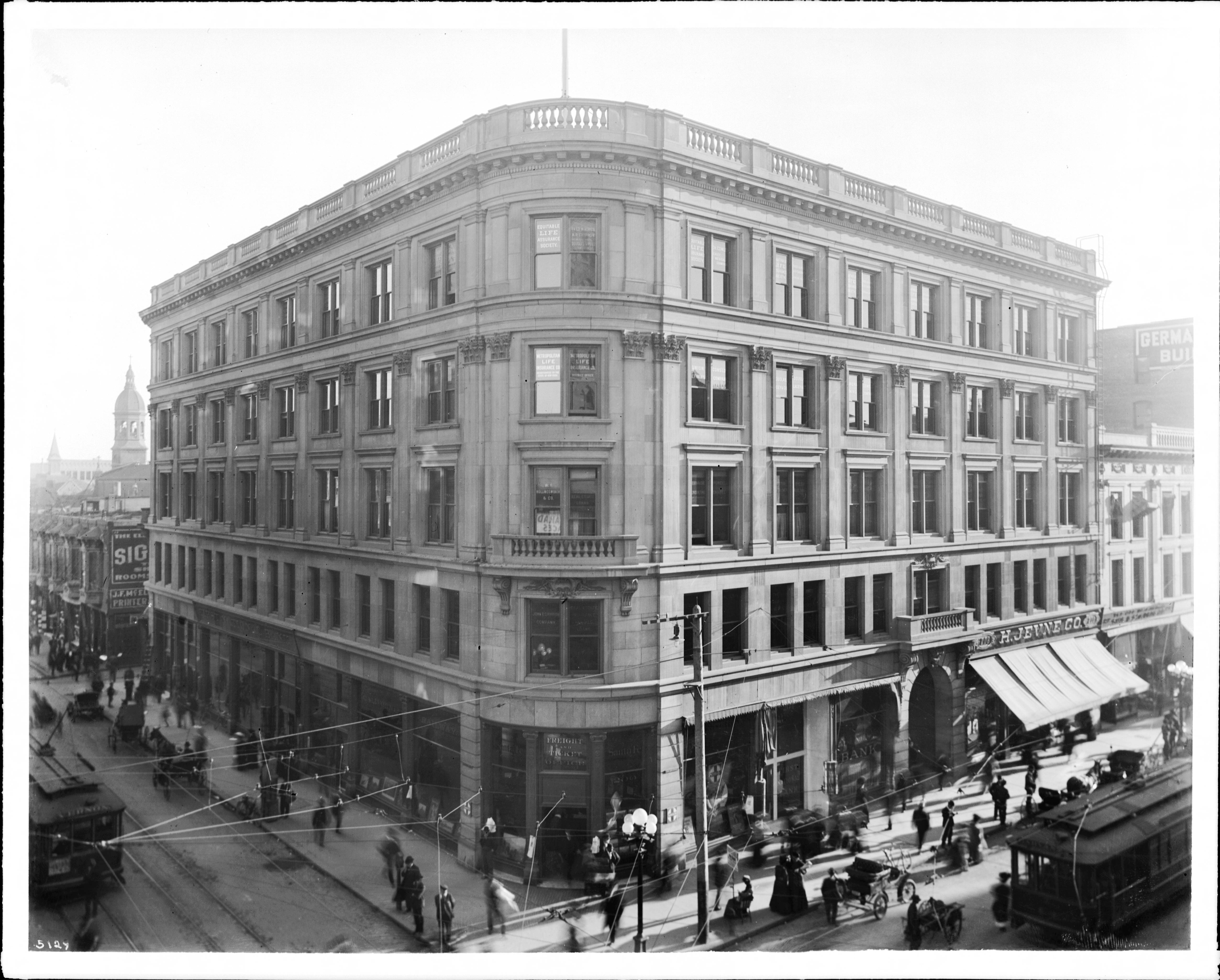
Wilcox Building, built 1895-6, photo from 1905

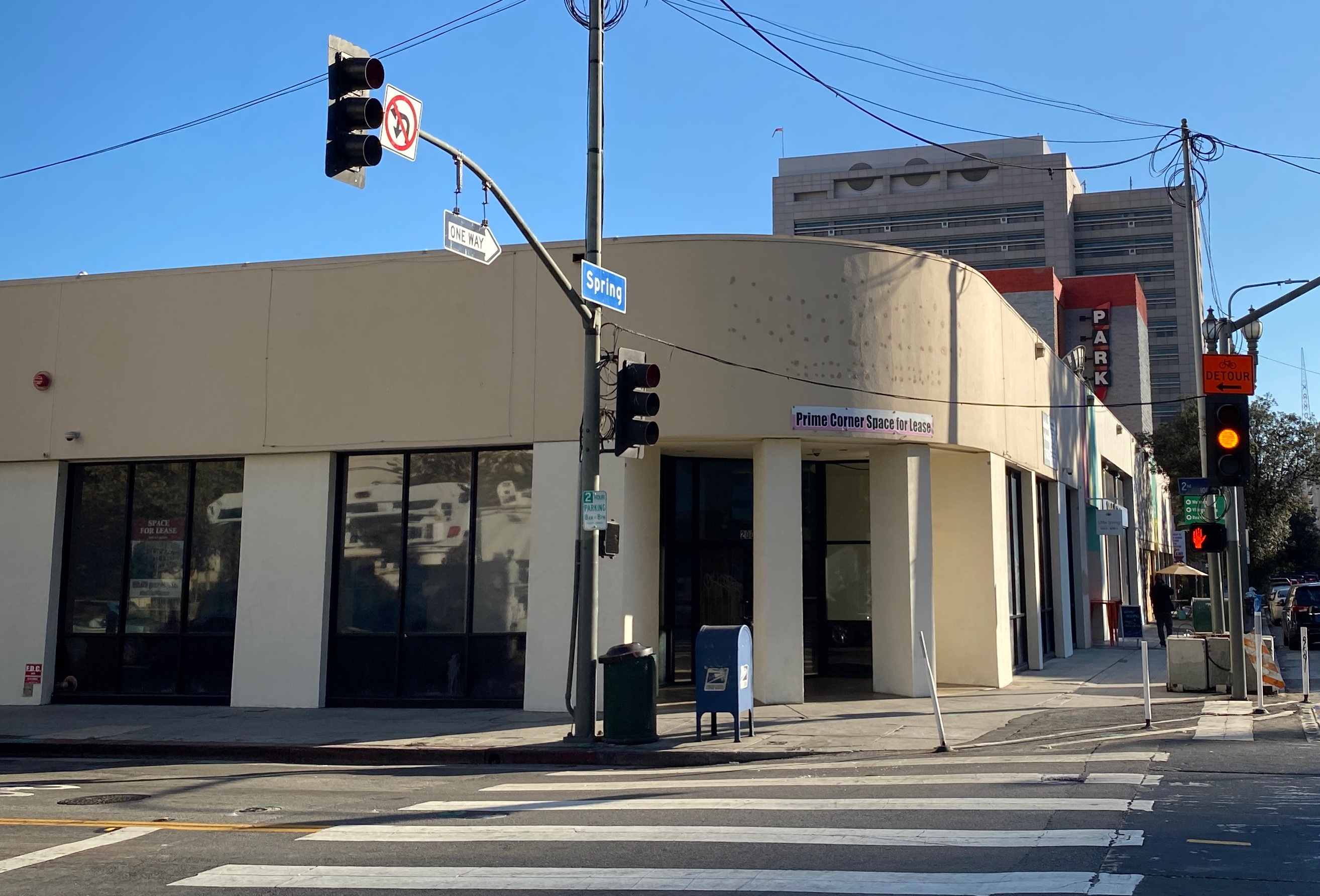
The Wilcox Building in September 2020

- Wilcox Building, built 1895-6, architects Pissis and Moore, five stories. All but the ground floor were removed in 1971 after damage from the 1971 Sylmar earthquake. It housed the larger of two branches of the H. Jevne & Co. gourmet grocery store, as well as the California Club until 1904, when the latter moved to Fourth and Hill streets. The Southwestern School of Law was on its top floors 1915–1924.

=== 200 block ===
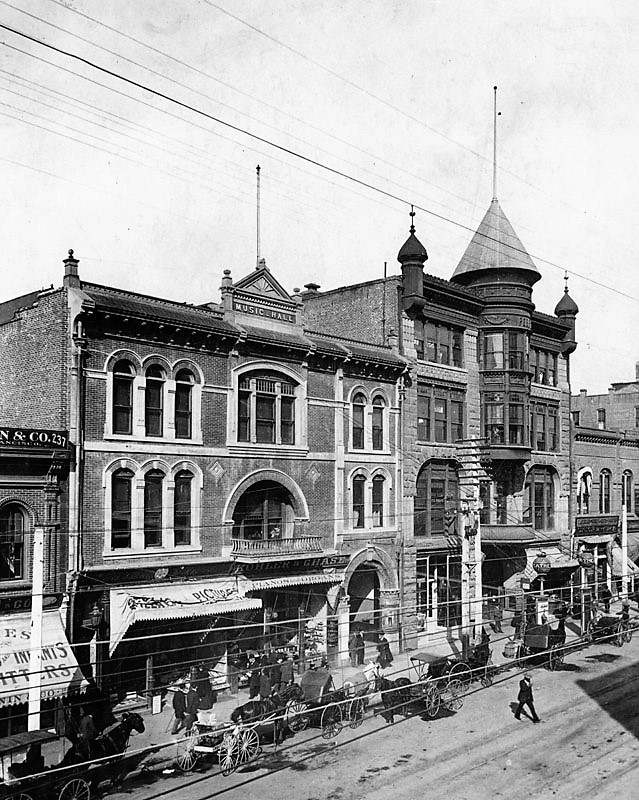
Music (Turnverein) Hall (l) and Los Angeles (Lyceum) Theatre (r). West side of Spring between 2nd and 3rd, 1895.

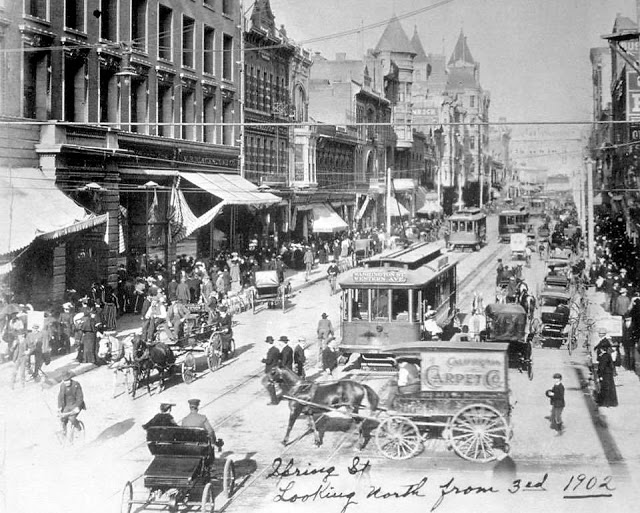
Looking north on Spring from 3rd St., 1902

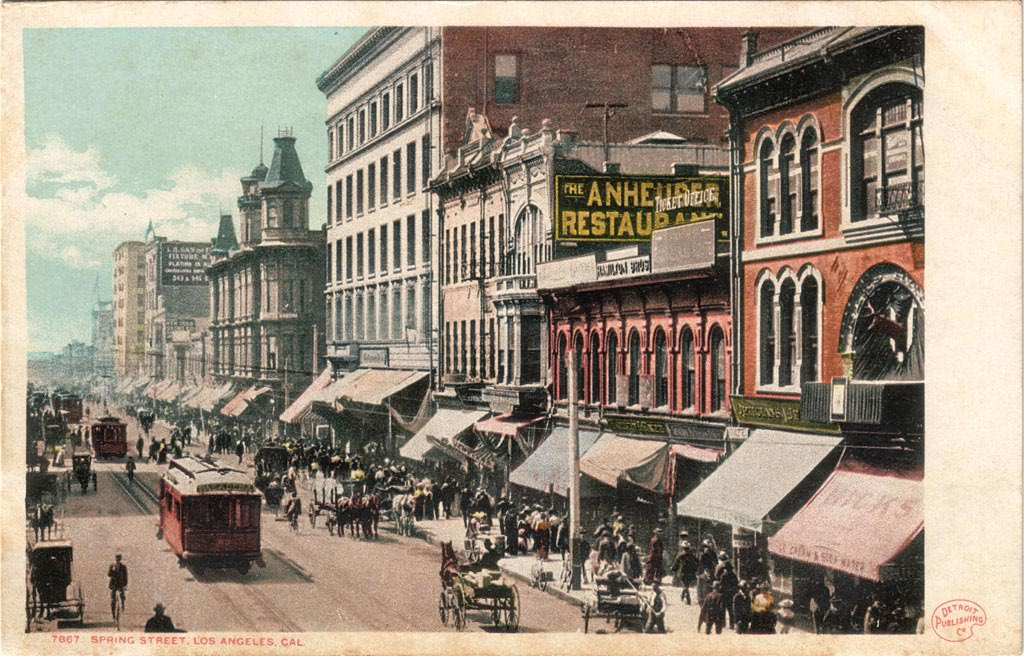
Looking south on Spring between 2nd and 3rd, c.1905. In the background at center: towers of the Hotel Ramona. To its right, the Douglas Building, Woollacott Block, Anheuser restaurant, Hamilton Bros. shoe store block, and portion of the Turnverein Hall

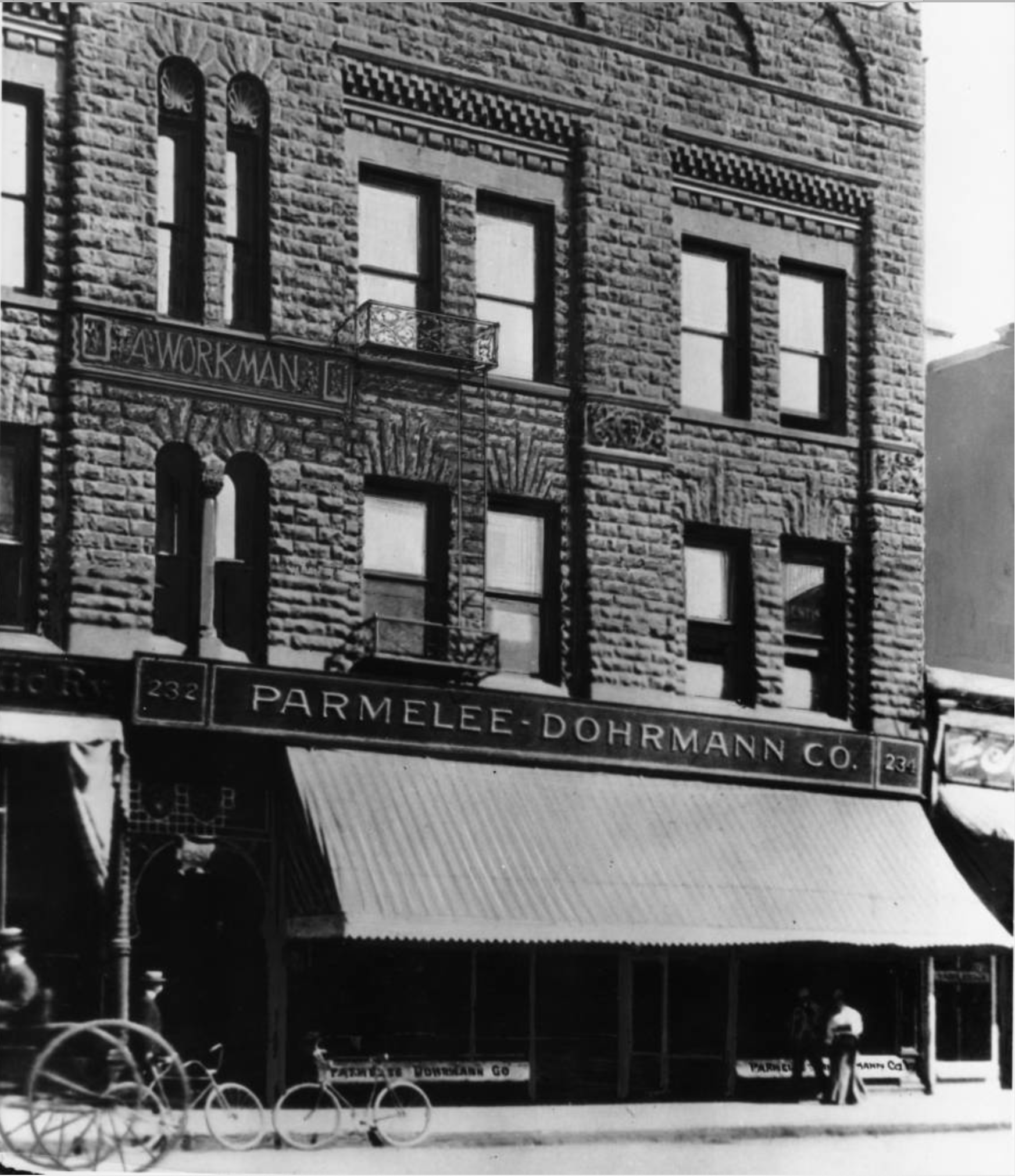
Parmelee-Dohrmann store at the Workman Block, 232–234 S. Spring, photo c.1900-1906

On the west side:

- #217 (pre-1890 numbering: #119), the Parisian Cloak and Suit Co., 1888–1892; then 221 S. Spring until 1899. One of the city's prominent retailers of women's clothing during that era.

Two theatres together called the Perry Buildings:

- at #225–9 was the Lyceum Theatre, opened in 1888 as the Los Angeles Theatre (not to be confused with the Los Angeles Theatre on Broadway, still standing). From 1903-1911 this venue operated as the Orpheum Theatre. As the Orpheum Circuit was a chain and changed venues several times, the "Orpheum Theatre" in Los Angeles was first at the Grand Opera House venue on Main Street, then at this venue, and finally at the venue now known as the Palace Theatre on Broadway.
- at #231–5 was the Turnverein Hall (opened 1879), a theatre, renamed the Music Hall in 1894, Elks Hall in the early 1900s and Lyceum Hall in 1915. Demolished.
- #237–241, Hamilton Bros. block, Hamilton Bros. (later Hamilton & Baker, C. H. Baker) shoe store at #239.
- #243, Anheuser-Busch saloon, later known as The Anheuser Restaurant.
- #245–7, Woollacott Block

On the east side:

- Stowell Block at #224–228. In 1894 the Los Angeles Athletic Club was located here from 1893 until 1895.
- Workman Block at #230–234. 232–234 were home to Parmelee-Dohrmann from 1899 through 1906. It was the city's premier store for china, crystal and silver, as well as — at that time — selling appliances like stoves and refrigerators. In 1906, the store moved to the 5th and Broadway area.

=== Third and Spring ===
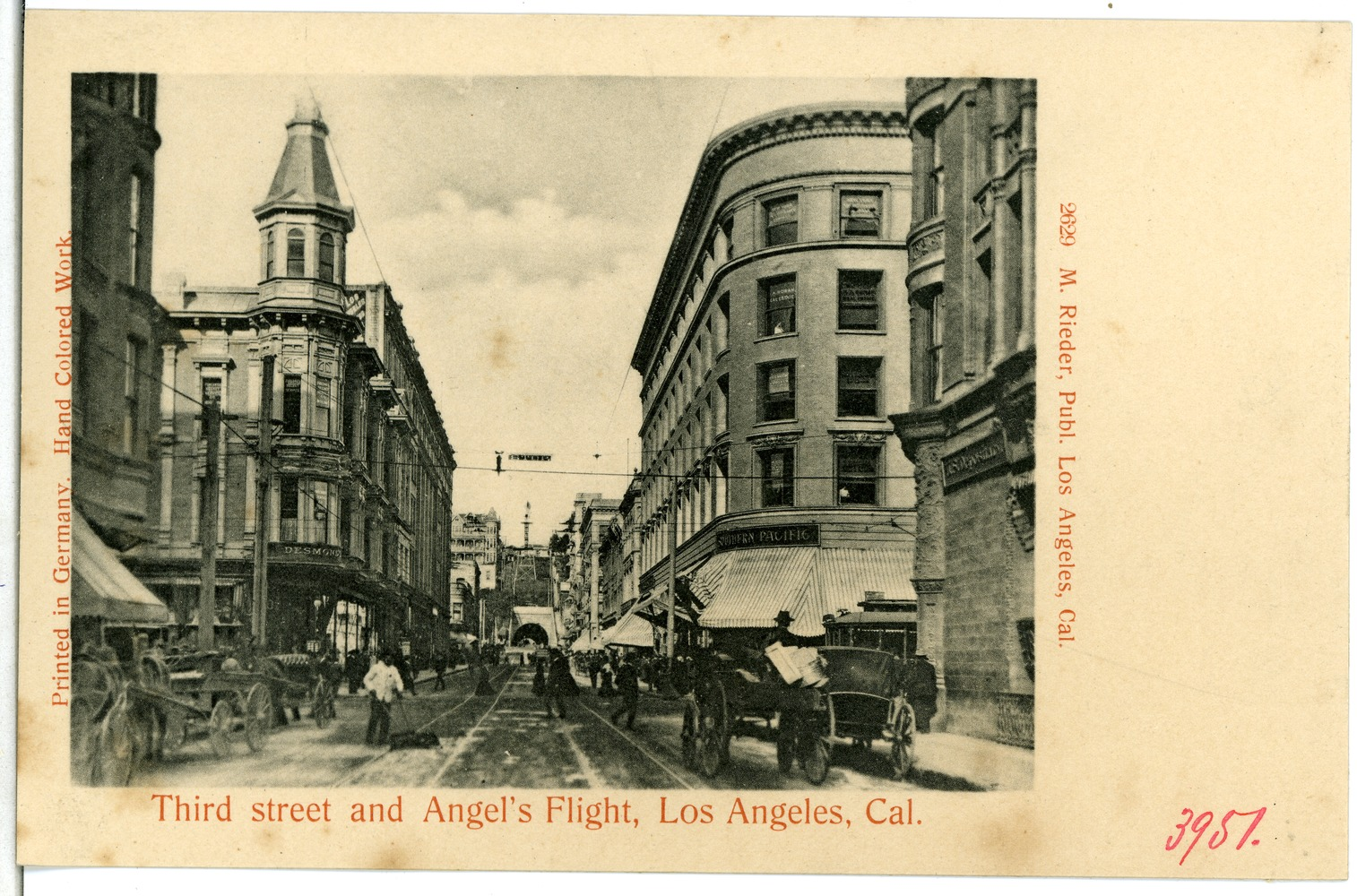
1903, looking west on Third past Spring: Desmond's store located 1900–1906 in the turreted Ramona Block on the SW corner, left, and Southern Pacific Railroad office in the Douglas Building, still standing today, on the NW corner, right. At far background, Angel's Flight at 3rd and Hill.

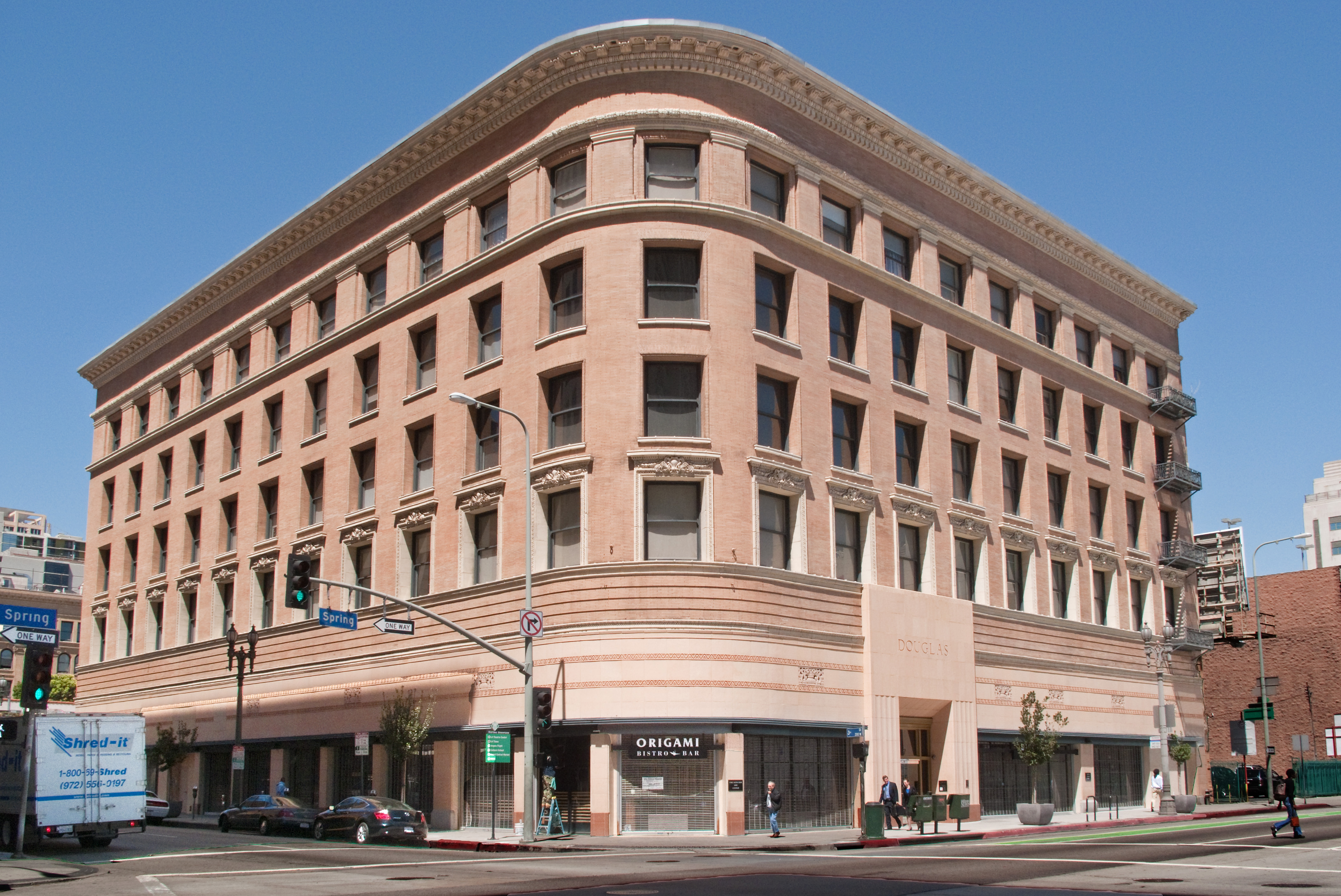
Douglas Building (1899– ), NW corner

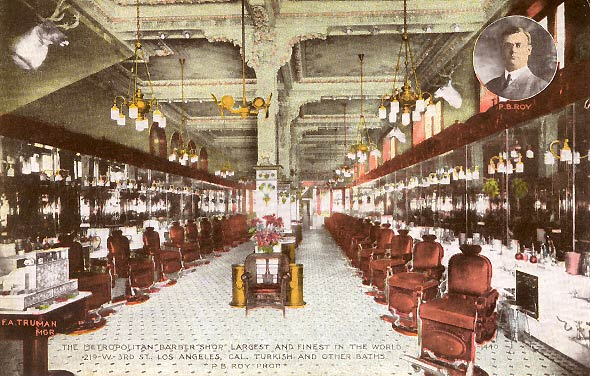
Metropolitan Barber Shop, 215 W. 3rd (demolished)

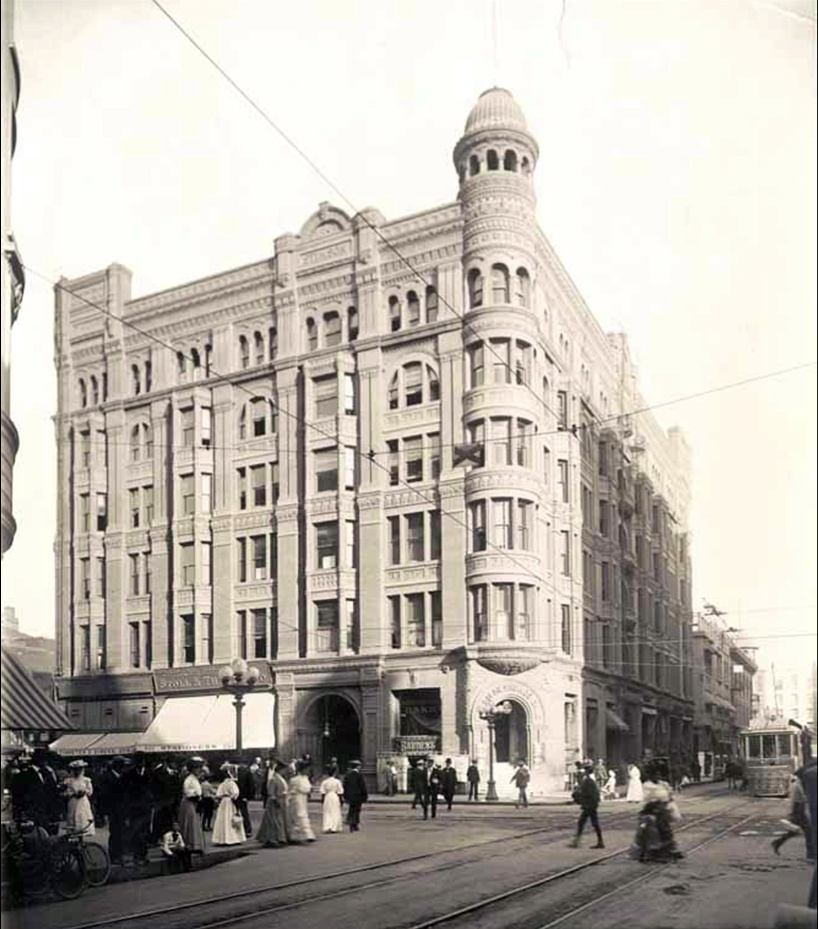
Stimson Block, NE corner (1893–1963)

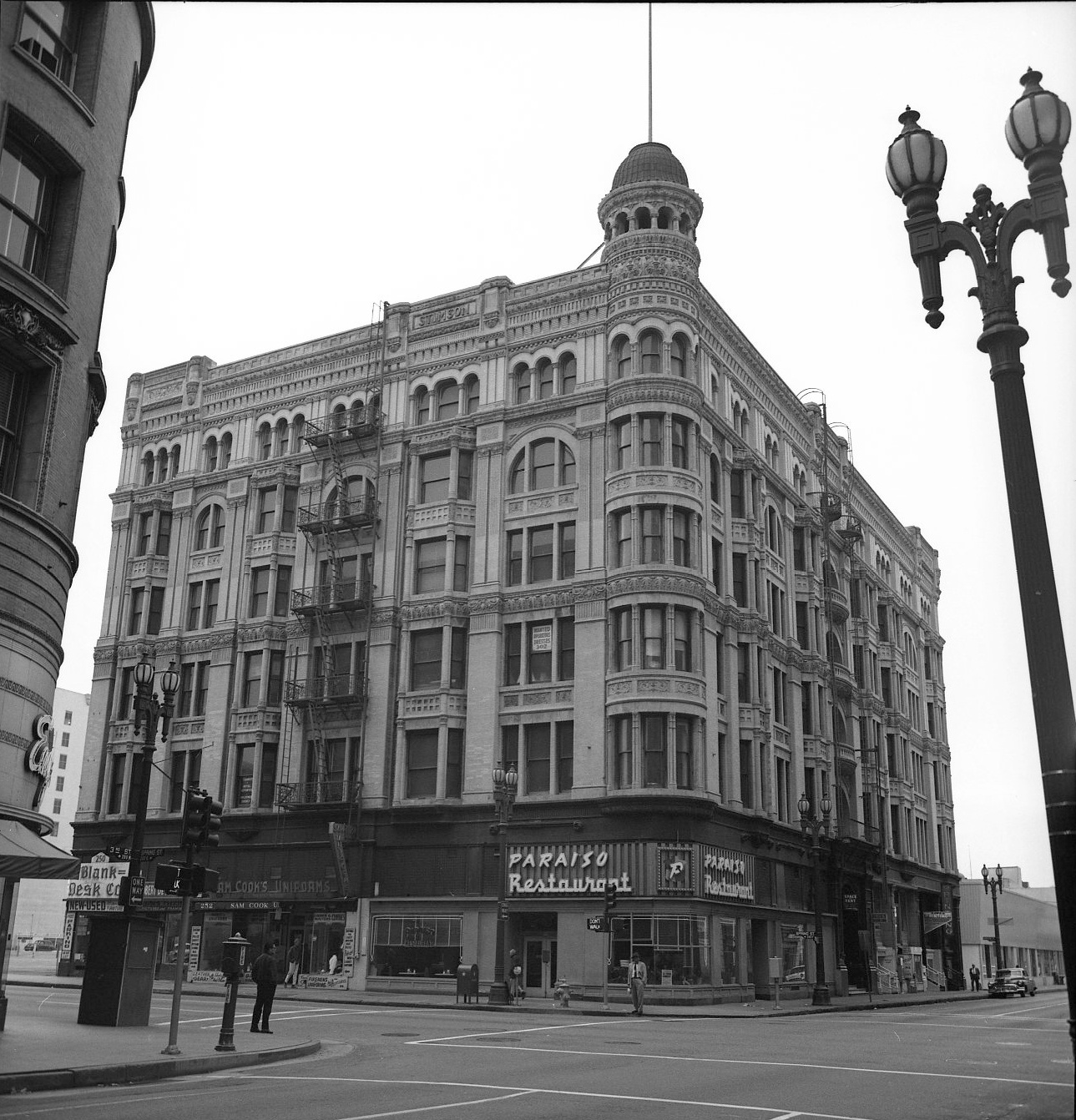
Stimson Block in the mid-20th century

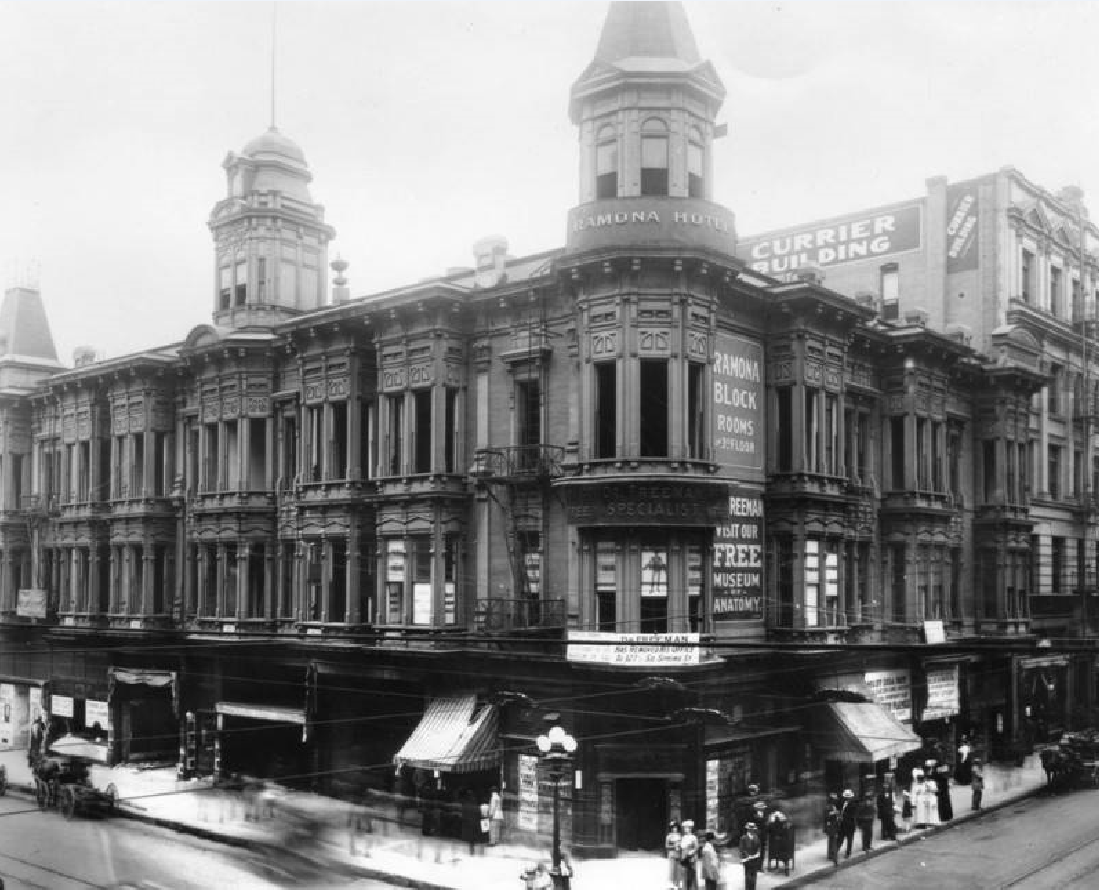
Hotel Ramona, SW corner (1885–1903)

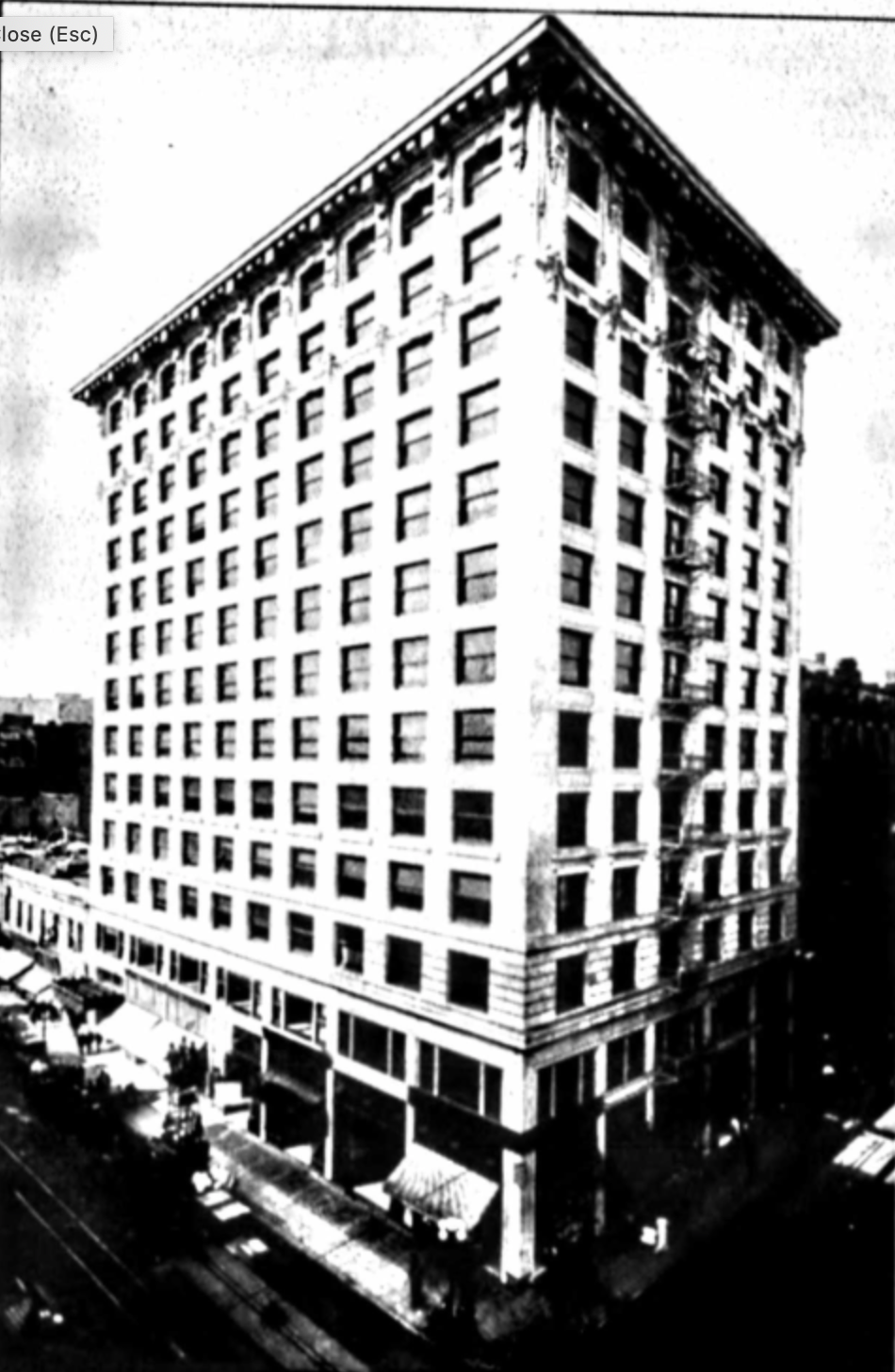
Washington Bldg. (1912) at SW corner

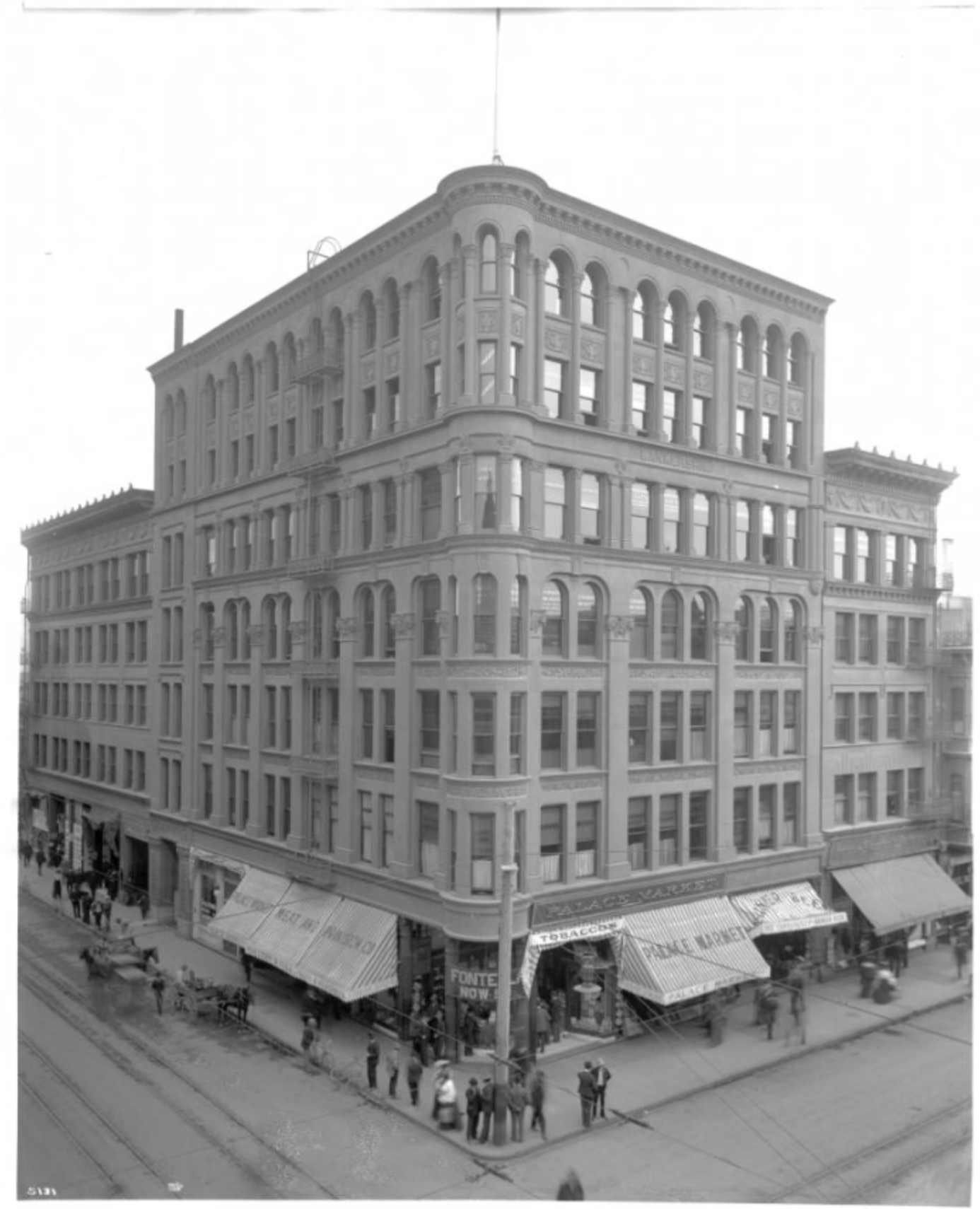
Lankershim Building (1896–1959), SE corner

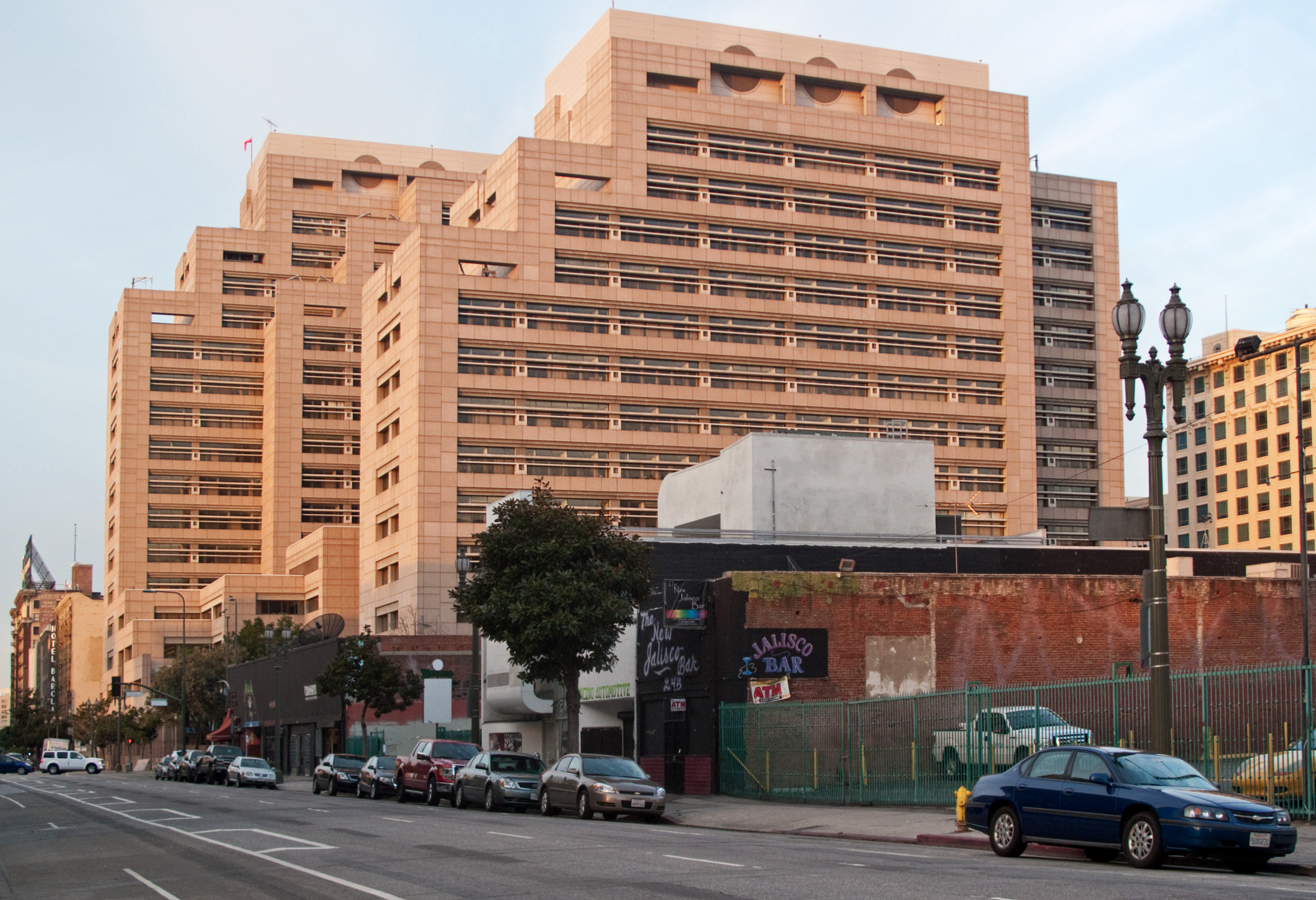
Ronald Reagan State Office Bldg. occupies the SE corner of 3rd & Spring today. Spring runs along its right side; this view looks south on Main St.

==== Northwest corner of Third and Spring ====
- Hammel and Denker Block (opened 1890, demolished 1899); Henry Hammel and Andrew H. Denker were business partners in hotels and ranching. Thomas Douglas Stimson bought it in 1893, thus owning two buildings at this intersection: this one and the Stimson Block (see below). Leading dry goods retailer Frank, Grey & Co. opened here in 1890 and the store was later taken bought by, and turned into a branch of J. M. Hale.
- The Hammel & Denker Block was demolished and replaced by the Douglas Block in 1899 and still standing, now condos.
- To the west of the Douglas Block stood the Metropolitan Barber Shop, originally at 214 W. 3rd, in 1908 it moved to 215-9 W. 3rd. The Los Angeles Herald claimed it to be the largest barber shop in the world at that time and the most expensive ever constructed, with 30 chairs, chandeliers and mahogany furnishings.

==== Northeast corner of Third and Spring ====
- Stimson Block or Stimson Building, built 1893, architect Carroll H. Brown (also designed the Stimson House), demolished 1963. The city's tallest building when it opened. Built for lumber magnate Thomas Douglas Stimson. Now site of a parking lot.

==== Southwest corner of Third and Spring ====
- The Callaghan Block or Ramona Block housing the Hotel Ramona, (1885, Burgess J. Reeve, classic bay-windowed style). Demolished in 1903 and replaced by the Washington Building, built 1912, Parkinson and Bergstrom, still standing.

==== Southeast corner of Third and Spring ====
- Site of the Lankershim Building (1896-7, Robert Brown Young, demolished 1959). Now the site of the Ronald Reagan State Building.

== See also ==
- List of Registered Historic Places in Los Angeles
- International Savings & Exchange Bank Building, (1907) at 227 N. Spring Street (now demolished)
