= Woman's Club of Hollywood =

Historic women's club in Hollywood, Los Angeles

- Traditional logo

- Contemporary logo Motto: Tis the Mind that Keeps the Body Rich; Slogan: The Heart of Hollywood

- Location within the Los Angeles metropolitan area Location within California Location within the United States
- Abbreviation: WCH, WCOH, HCLA
- Successor: Hollywood Club LA
- Formation: 1905
- Type: Women's club
- Legal status: 501c3
- Location(s): 1749 North La Brea Avenue; Los Angeles, California 90046, United States
- Coordinates: 34°06′10″N 118°20′45″W
- Website: wcoh.org womansclubhollywood.org hollywoodclubla.org
- Formerly called: Hollywood School for Girls
- Woman's Club of Hollywood
- U.S. National Register of Historic Places
- Los Angeles Historic-Cultural Monument
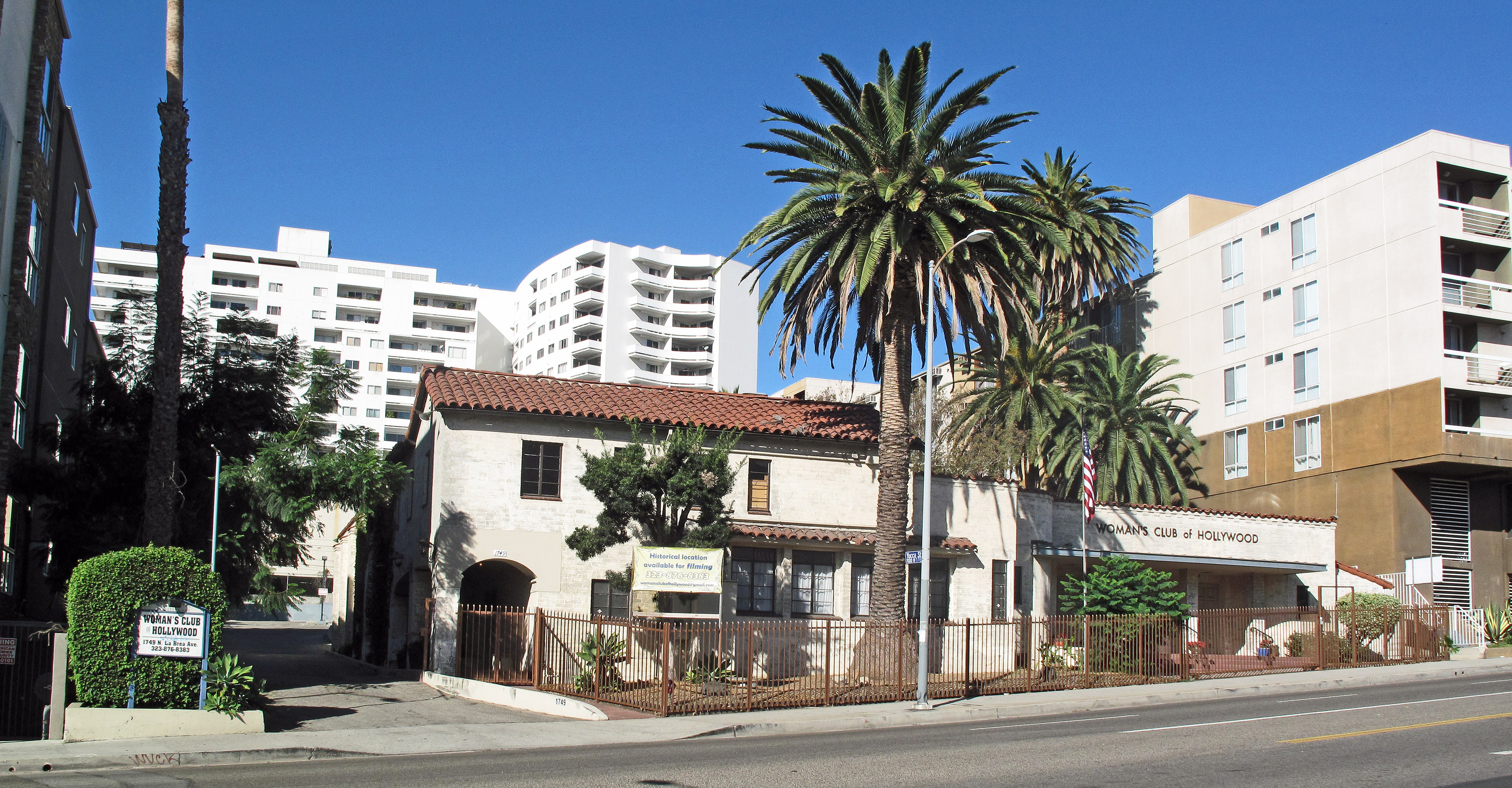
- 1949 clubhouse
- Area: Hollywood
- Built: 1903; 1947–1949
- Architect: Unknown; Arthur E. Harvey
- Architectural style: Prairie School; Spanish Colonial Revival
- NRHP reference No.: 16000883
- LAHCM No.: 604

Significant dates
- Added to NRHP: December 27, 2016
- Designated LAHCM: November 1, 1994

The Women's Club of Hollywood, also known as the Hollywood Club LA, serves as a social and philanthropic organization with close connections to the local film industry. The historic women's club sits on the former campus of the Hollywood School for Girls.

== Club history ==
Fourteen women founded the club in 1905 with the goal of establishing a library in Hollywood. That library opened in a temporary location in 1906 and then the group received funding from Andrew Carnegie for a permanent building. In 1910, that library became a branch of the Los Angeles Public Library which continues today as the Frank Gehry designed Frances Goldwyn Library.

After that initial success, the group's mission became broader as it grew alongside Hollywood. In 1914, they constructed a permanent clubhouse on Hollywood Boulevard, where the Four Ladies of Hollywood are now located. The club helped to found Hollywood Hospital, Hollywood Studio Club, Hollywood Bowl, and Hollywood Union High School.

In the 1920s, the group hosted music and educational presentations, including a poetry reading by Vachel Lindsay. During both world wars, the club served as a Red Cross center.

By the mid-1940s, the area around their original location became primarily commercial, so the group first sold their Hollywood Concert Hall and then their original clubhouse. They bought a former school campus on La Brea Avenue to construct a new clubhouse, while keeping the original schoolhouse.

Completed in 1949, that clubhouse included multiple spaces for meetings and events. The club received regular visits from Hollywood celebrities including Joan Crawford, Charlie Chaplin, Mary Pickford, and Gary Cooper to host luncheons and lectures.

As women faced fewer social restrictions in 20th century, the club faced competition for their time. While the WCH counted over 900 members in the 1960s, by the 1970s most members worked outside the home and had less time to volunteer. By the 1990s, the membership consisted mostly of retirees.

In the 2010s, a leadership struggle ensued followed by a proposal to replace the clubhouse with a condominium development in the now densely developed La Brea Avenue area. The group considered merging with Hollywood Heritage, and, in 2011, it attempted to file for bankruptcy. During this period, membership continued to dwindle.

In recent years, the club increasingly embraces its association with the Golden Age of Hollywood to encourage a revival. This includes hosting a fashion show of movie wardrobes from the Western Costume Company and screening classic films. Beginning in 2024, the venue is cobranded as the "Hollywood Club LA".

== Hollywood School for Girls ==
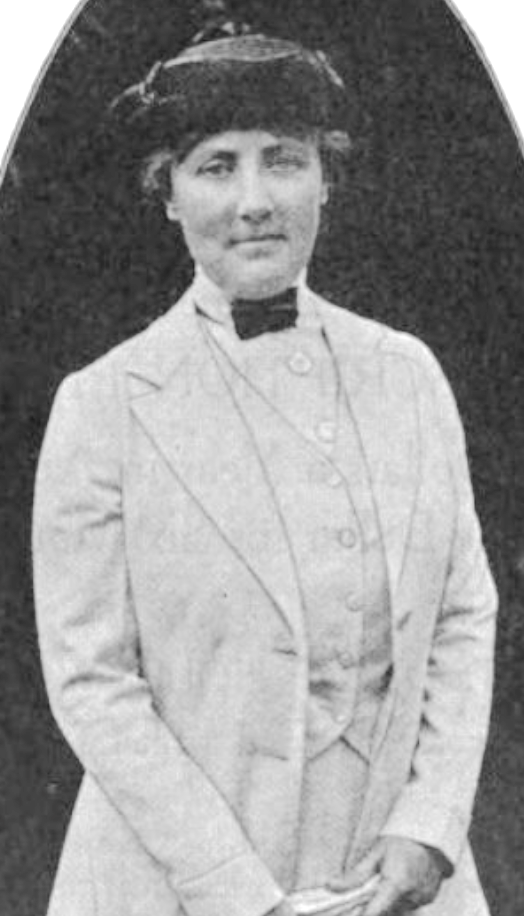
Principal Louise Knappen Woollett

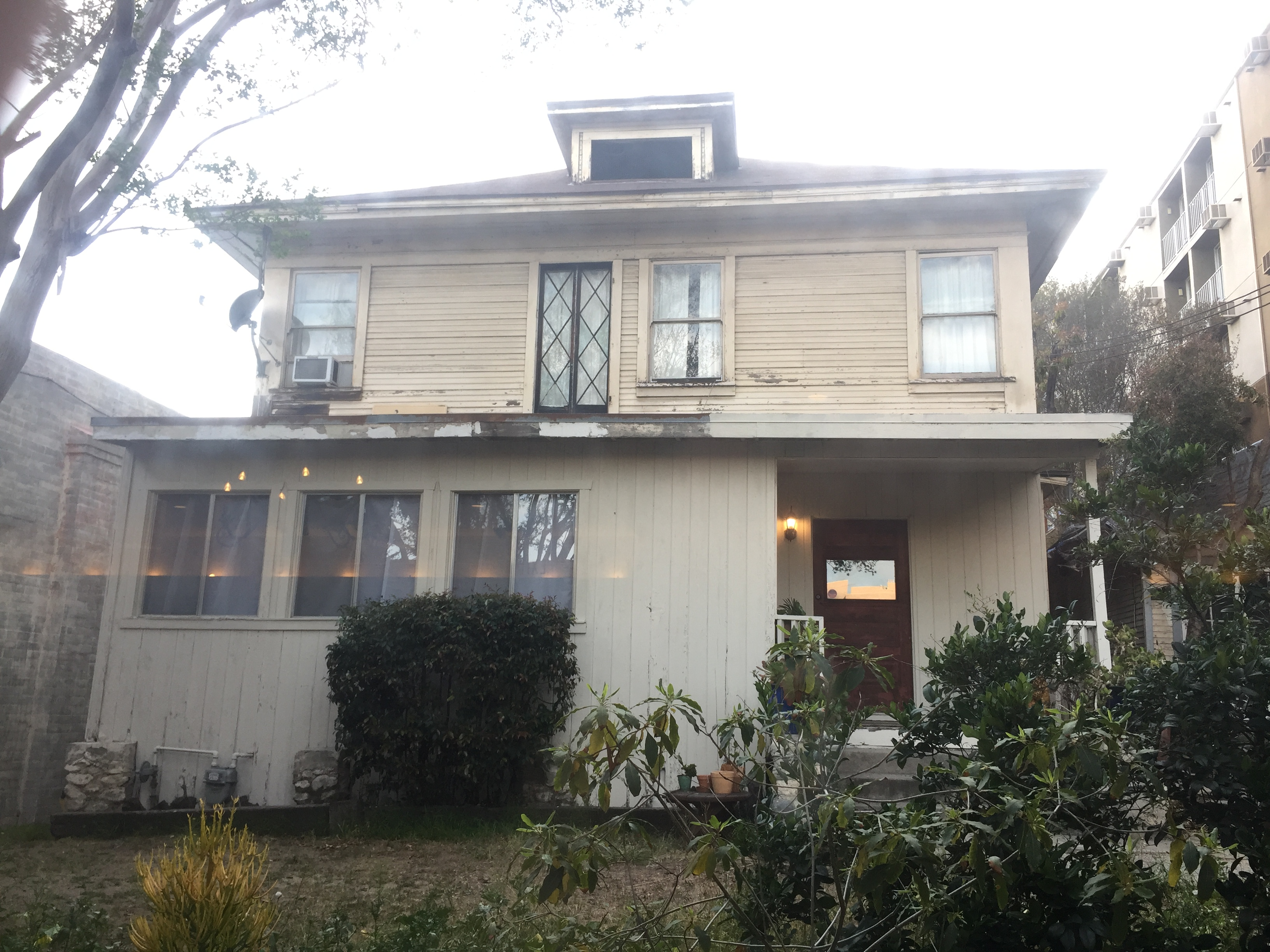
The Hollywood School for Girls in April 2018.

Sophie Hogan founded the Hollywood School for Girls in 1909 which eventually moved into a former house on La Brea Avenue in 1915. Louise Knappen became the principal and lived on-site until she married local architect William Lee Woollett. By 1917 the school's student body consisted of 100 girls and 12 boys; the latter were limited to the lower grades. After constructing stand-alone cottages to serve as classrooms, the campus became an outdoor educational environment.

The school maintained close links to the movie industry, including taking field trips to the set of Lasky-DeMille Studios. The children of prominent families attended the school including Noah Beery Jr., Douglas Fairbanks Jr., Jean Harlow, Jesse L. Lasky Jr., Evelyn Scott, Irene Mayer Selznick, Francis X. Bushman, Reginald Denny, Peggy George, Joel McCrea, Katherine DeMille, Agnes de Mille, and Mary Hunter Wolf. The school's French teacher, Edith Head, went on to become an Academy Award-winning costume designer for Paramount.

The school closed in 1932 due to the Great Depression and the Hollywood Woman's Club purchased the property in 1945. In the interim, Studio Village operated on the site as an artist colony that included science fiction artist Chesley Bonestell as a resident. Finally, the original schoolhouse became guest apartments for the club.

== Architecture ==
Local architect Arthur E. Harvey designed the 1949 clubhouse in the Spanish Colonial Revival style. Compared to his other commissions, the structure is simpler because of post-war material shortages. The exterior of the two-story building consists of cream-colored exterior walls with a low pitched Spanish tiled roof. The south facade along the driveway includes pilasters with iron sconces. On the north side, an arcade spans the original front entrance with a round tower. On the east side is a small, one-story addition which shifted the entrance to face the road.

The interior includes a large foyer with painted wooden ceiling beams, a ticket booth, and cloakroom by the entrance. A two-story auditorium dominates the rest of the first floor and includes hardwood floors with a raised stage. The second story includes meeting rooms while the one-story addition contains a commercial kitchen and a lounge.

The older 1903 Hollywood School for Girls building originally belonged to Charles Hanchett whose widow sold it to the school. The two-story wooden house uses clapboard siding with a corner porch, bay windows, and a rear porch in a Prairie School design. When owned by the school, the downstairs served as a meeting space while the upstairs served as the principal's living quarters. Later, the artist colony used the building as the Little Theater while the Woman's Club housed guests in what became their Hospitality House.

In 1994 the city recognized the club as a Los Angeles Historic-Cultural Monument and, in 2016, the National Register of Historic Places listed the site.

== See also ==
- List of women's clubs
- National Register of Historic Places listings in Los Angeles
- List of Los Angeles Historic-Cultural Monuments in Hollywood
