= Old Bank District, Los Angeles =

Old Bank District
- Neighborhood of Los Angeles
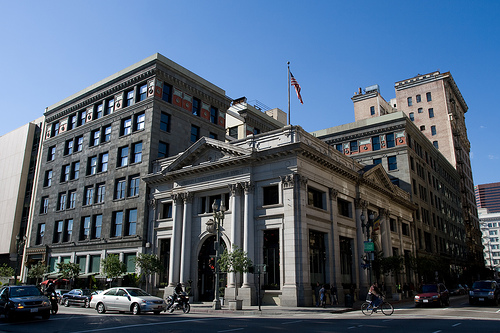
- Old Bank District in Downtown Los Angeles

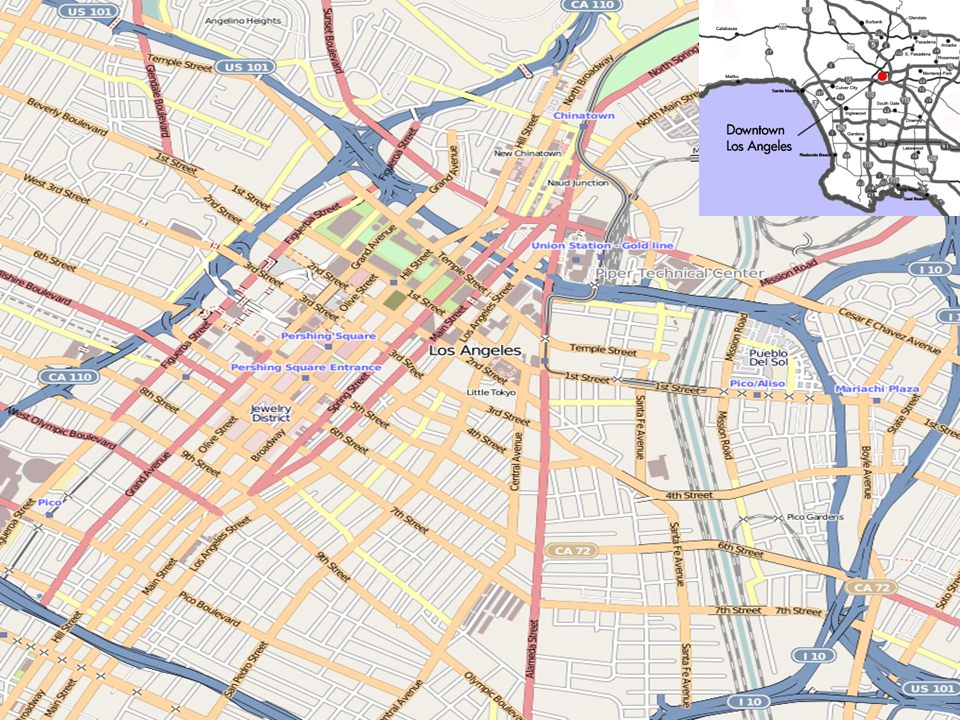
- Location within Downtown Los Angeles
- Coordinates: 34.047483°N 118.248027°W
- Country: United States
- State: California
- County: County of Los Angeles
- City: Los Angeles
- Area code: 213

The Old Bank District is a group of early 20th century commercial buildings located in the Historic Core of Downtown Los Angeles between Main and Spring streets from 4th to 5th. The area is roughly bordered by the Jewelry District, the Fashion District, Gallery Row, the Toy District, and the L.A. Civic Center. Many of the buildings within it have been (or are being) converted into residential (loft) use.

Though the name suggests a subdistrict of the city, it is actually the name of the residential conversion project proposed by developer Tom Gilmore in 1998. Spurred on by the city's 1999 passage of an adaptive reuse ordinance, the first structure opened in fall 2000. Since that time, Gilmore has generally applied the Old Bank District label to his growing portfolio of upscale eateries and retail space tenants. On January 8, 2004, the Old Bank District became an official city-designated district. The borders are 3rd Street at the northern border, 6th Street at the southern border, Los Angeles Street on the Eastern border, and Spring Street on the western border.

The Old Bank District overlaps with the Spring Street Financial District.

== Properties ==
Properties owned by Old Bank District / Gilmore Associates:

- The Continental Building
- The Isaias W. Hellman Office Building
- The San Fernando Building
- Farmers and Merchants Bank Building

Adjacent properties:

- The El Dorado Lofts
- The Rowan Building
- Rosslyn Lofts

== In popular culture ==
- Downtown with Huell Howser

== See also ==
- Central Business District, Los Angeles (1880-1899)
- Hotel Rosslyn Annex
