= Woollett =

Woollett is a surname of English origin and may refer to:

- Alan Woollett, British football player
- Charlie Woollett (1920–2011), British football player
- Henry Winslow Woollett (1895–1969), British World War I flying ace
- Louise Knappen Woollett (1875–1955), American educator
- Tony Woollett (1927–2004), British cricketer
- Walter "Babe" Woollett (1906–1998), prominent figure of Canadian aviation
- William Woollett (1735–1785), British engraver
- William Lee Woollett (1873–1955), American architect
