= Woolvett =

Woolvett is a surname. Notable people with the surname include:

- Gordon Michael Woolvett (born 1970), Canadian actor
- Jaimz Woolvett (born 1967), Canadian actor

== See also ==
- Woollett
