= Isaias W. Hellman Building =

- Farmers and Merchants Bank of Los Angeles
- U.S. National Register of Historic Places
- U.S. Historic district – Contributing property
- Los Angeles Historic-Cultural Monument
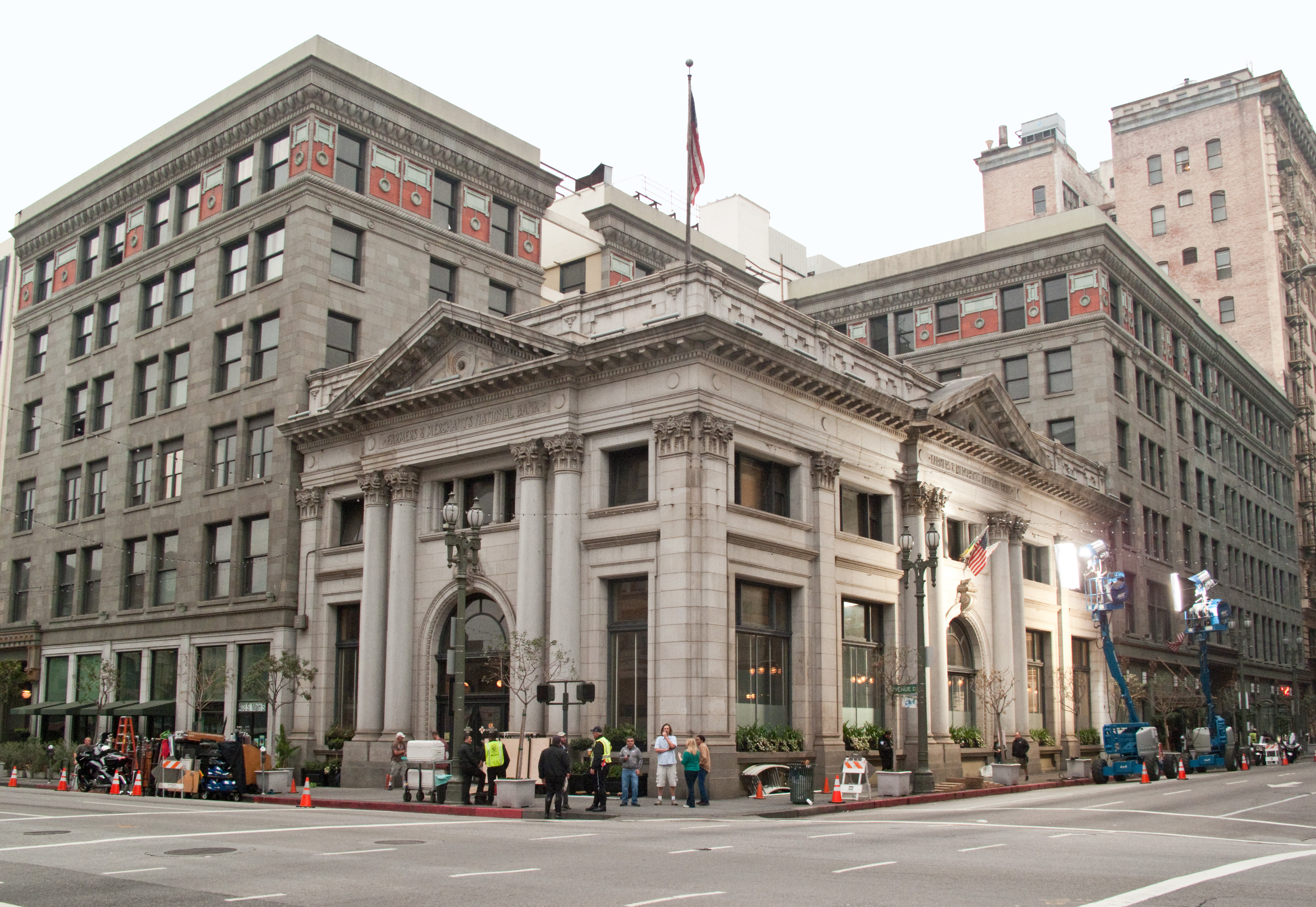
- Isaias W. Hellman Building surrounding Farmers and Merchants Bank of Los Angeles, 2013

- Location within the Los Angeles metropolitan area
- Location: 405-11 S. Main Street, 110-14 and 118-24 W. Fourth Street, 410-12 S. Spring Street, Los Angeles, California, United States
- Coordinates: 34.048219°N 118.248051°W
- Built: 1905-1914
- Architectural style: Beaux Arts
- Part of: Spring Street Financial District
- NRHP reference No.: 79000489 (original); 00000387 (increase)
- LAHCM No.: 729

Significant dates
- Designated CP: August 10, 1979 (Spring Street portion), April 21, 2000 (entire building)
- Designated LAHCM: October 18, 2002

Isaias W. Hellman Building, also known as Hellman Building, is a historic building located at 405-11 S. Main Street, 110-14 and 118-24 W. Fourth Street, and 410-12 S. Spring Street, in the Old Bank District in Los Angeles, California. It is a Los Angeles Historic Cultural Monument and part of the National Register of Historic Places-listed Spring Street Financial District.

== Location ==
Isaias W. Hellman Office Building is located in the block between Spring Street, Main Street and 4th Street, in the Old Bank District. It has entrances at 410 S. Spring, 411 S. Main and 124 W. 4th Street. It surrounds the Farmers and Merchants Bank of Los Angeles as well as the Continental Building.

== History ==
Prior to the construction of Isaias W. Hellman Building, Isaias Hellman's home was located on the Main Street side of the property. Hellman sold his home to Farmers and Merchants Bank of Los Angeles, who built a bank on the site. Isaias W. Hellman Building was then built around two sides of the bank; construction on the building began in 1905 and ended in 1912. An annex to this building on Spring Street was completed in 1914. Both this building and the bank building it surrounds were designed by Morgan, Walls & Morgan.

The Los Angeles Stock Exchange was housed in the building from 1907 to 1921.

In 1979, the Spring Street Financial District was added to the National Register of Historic Places, with Hellman Annex located on Spring Street listed as a contributing property in the district. In 2000, the district was expanded to include the entire building. The building was designated Los Angeles Historic-Cultural Monument No. 729 on October 18, 2002.

== Architecture and design ==
Isaias W. Hellman Building is roughly S-shaped in plan and fronts Fourth, Main, and Spring Street. The building wraps around Farmers and Merchants Bank of Los Angeles and The Continental. It was built with a steel frame and terra cotta facade. Ground level windows are modern and metal-frame, while upper story windows are mostly original wood-frame, one-over-one, double-hung sash, and feature bead molding and plain lug sills.

The building features a features a horizontally-focused Beaux Arts design. The parts wrap around Farmers and Merchants Bank of Los Angeles contains a ground-level base, second through fifth floor shaft, and sixth floor capital. A plain frieze separates the base and the shaft, the frieze trimmed with bead and reel molding on top and a bead molding below. A second plain frieze, this one a accented by bosses and also trimmed with bead and reel molding, is located above the fifth story windows. The shaft is faced with gray-green terra cotta.

The Main Street facade is divided into four bays. Panelled jambs, scroll brackets, and a concrete corbelled cornice are located in the recessed entryway of the southernmost bay, while the ground floor of the other bays is clad in granite and features two windows separated by piers in each bay. The upper stories continue the bay division, with a single window on each story above the entrance and paired windows on each story above others.

The ground floor of the Fourth Street facade are clad in cast concrete and have a stone base. This front features three bays, each defined by panelled pilasters with stylized capitals and granite bases. The center bay contains a recessed entrance with a flat awning and cast iron trim, while the side bays contain large display windows with granite kick plates. A group of three windows is located above the center-bay entrance, while single windows are located in the side bays. Each bay also contains blind transoms.

The most decorated portion of the building is its capital. Here, windows rest on spiral moldings and each bays is clad with red stone punctuated by terra cotta wreaths and tablets. The capital also features cornice with a fluted frieze and egg and dart molding, all topped by a plain parapet.

The building's Sixth Street front, known as Hellman Annex, is seven stories in height, with the additional story located in the shaft. The ground floor features a storefront framed by piers and entablature; the piers are faced with panels trimmed with molding that terminate in trefoil-patterned tracery. The shaft is divided into three bays and accented by quatrefoil medallions. Each story of each bay contains tripartite windows that consist of a fixed center pane and one-over-one double-hung sash topped by multipaned transom on each side. Bas-relief panels divided by an escutcheon at each pier separate the sixth and seventh stories. Trefoil-arched panels crowned with stylized capitals are located above the escutcheon, and the capital also features elaborate cornice that contain corbel courses, scrolled brackets the center of which resembles a key stone, lintel, a flat parapet topped by a band of dentils.

Inside, Hellman Annex lacks a lobby, elevators, and staircases; instead each Annex floor is accessed through the Fourth Street portion of the building.
