= Historic Core, Los Angeles =

Neighborhood of Downtown Los Angeles

Historic Core
- Neighborhood
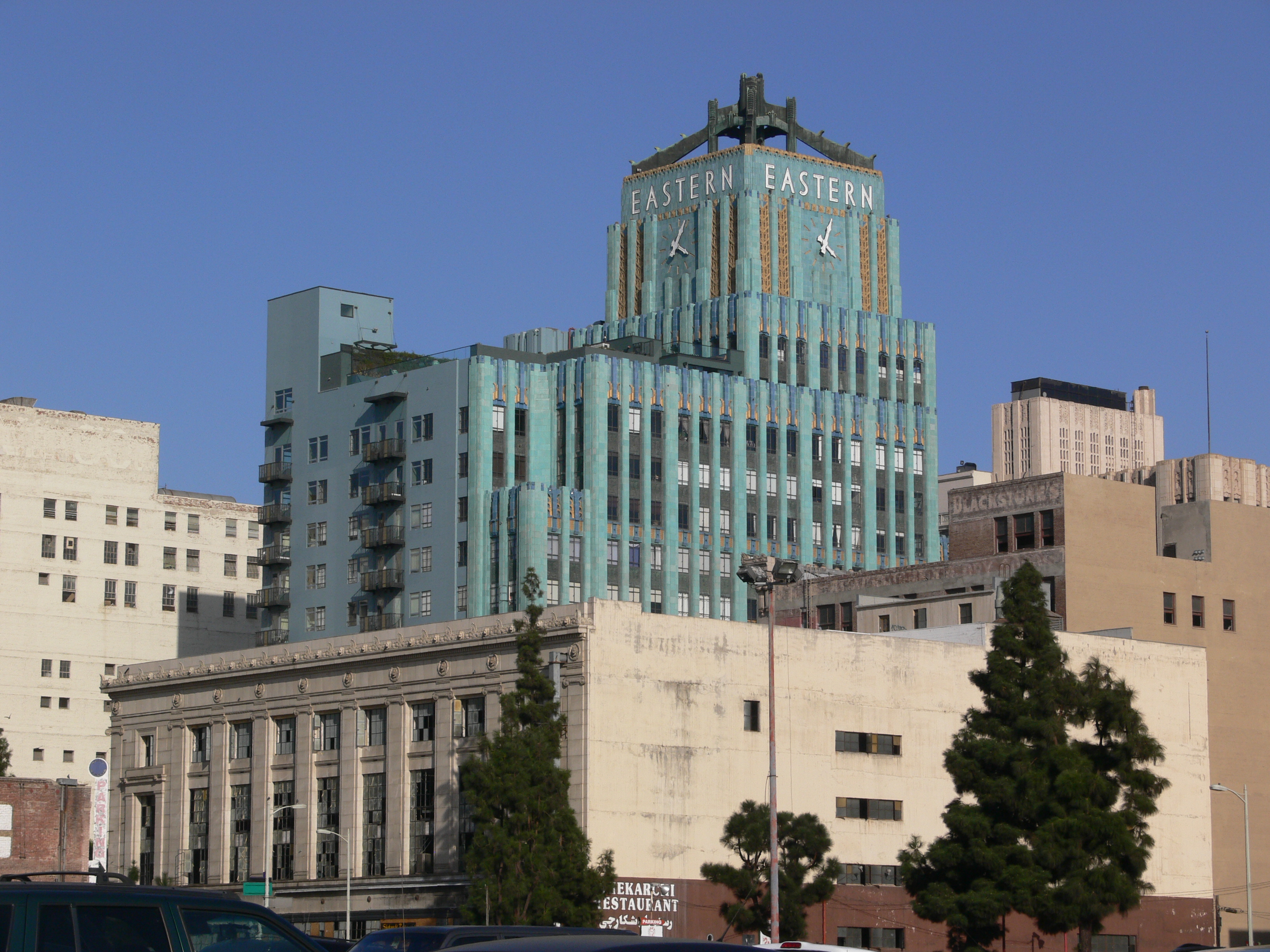
- Eastern Columbia Building

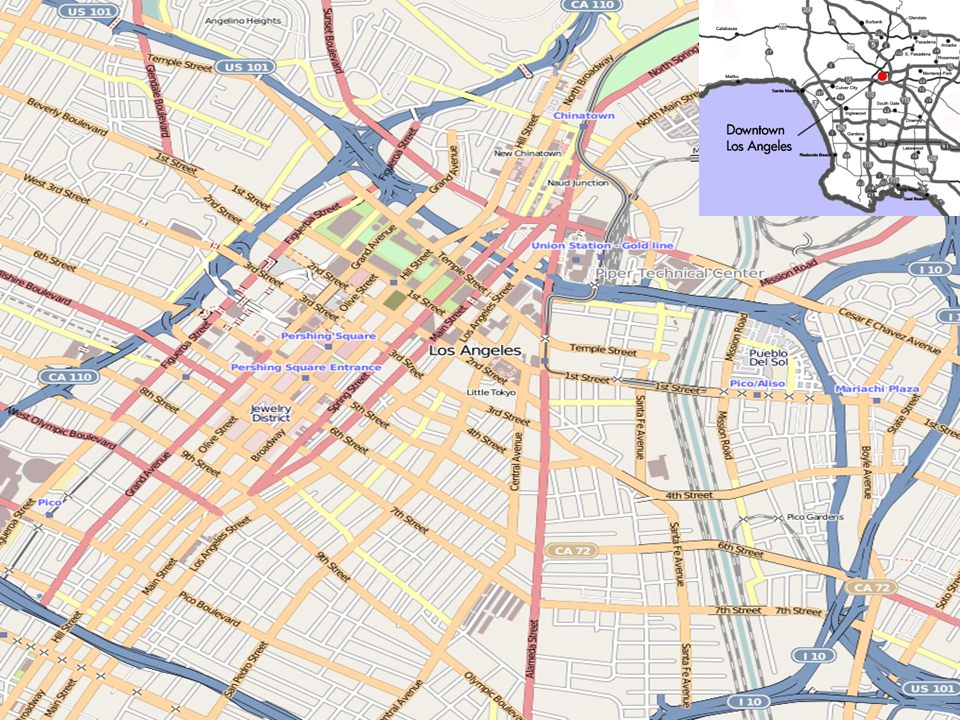
- Location within Downtown Los Angeles
- Coordinates: 34.05349°N 118.245319°W
- Country: United States
- State: California
- County: Los Angeles County
- City: Los Angeles
- Named: 1990s
- Zip code: 90013
- Streets: 3rd Street, 4th Street, Broadway, Hill Street, Main Street, Olympic Boulevard, Spring Street

The Historic Core is a district within Downtown Los Angeles that includes the world's largest concentration of movie palaces, former large department stores, and office towers, all built chiefly between 1907 and 1931. Within it lie the Broadway Theater District and the Spring Street historic financial district, and in its west it overlaps with the Jewelry District and in its east with Skid Row.

The Historic Core falls into two business improvement districts, Historic Core (south of 4th St.) and Downtown LA (from 2nd to 4th Street). The total Historic Core is thus composed of:

- Los Angeles Street from 2nd to 6th streets,
- Spring Street and Main Street from 2nd to 7th streets,
- Broadway from 2nd to 9th streets,
- Hill Street from 2nd to 10th streets

== History ==
The Historic Core was the central business district of the city from the first decade of the 1900s through the 1950s. Before 1900 the business center was further north, between the Plaza and about Third Street. Starting in the 1950s what is now the Historic Core started to decline. Upscale shopping had moved west to the Seventh & Hope area starting in the 1920s, and to Mid-Wilshire by the 1930s. When consumers lived and worked near the prolific streetcar lines, it was relatively easy for them to reach downtown, the hub of both the Los Angeles Railway and Pacific Electric systems. Now, an ever increasing number of consumers had cars, lived further away from downtown, and due to the proliferation of suburban retail, were able to shop, dine, and go to the movies there without worries about downtown parking and traffic congestion. In addition, after World War II, financial institutions moved several blocks to the west, ending up on Figueroa Street, Flower Street, and Grand Avenue. In the 1950s the Historic Core became the center of Latino retail and entertainment in the city, e.g.: the Million Dollar Theatre featured the biggest names in the Spanish language entertainment world. This paralleled the general white flight occurring in Central Los Angeles at the time, which saw Broadway become a major center for Latino life in the city.

Although prostitution and drug dealing had occurred in the area as far back as the early 1920s, they became epidemic in the 1960s. The area's movie palaces, built between 1911 and 1931, became grindhouses. The last of them closed in the 1990s; the Orpheum Theatre recently underwent a complete restoration at a cost of several million dollars, and is now used for major movie premieres (such as "Collateral" in 2005), celebrity events (Michael Jackson's birthday party), comedy shows (Bill Burr), fashion shows, concerts (Opeth), and plays. Most of the older buildings have stores that cater to the Latino immigrant working class.

The developing street gang problem in Los Angeles which began to worsen at the end of the 1960s and got considerably worse in the late 1970s, also hurt traditional commercial activity in the area, as it did much of downtown. While the LAPD indicates that the area is a sort of neutral zone, which has not been claimed by any single gang and random gang violence is rare, the area remains one of the major areas for street drug sales in Los Angeles.

== Redevelopment ==
In 1999, the Los Angeles City Council passed an Adaptive Re-Use Ordinance, allowing for the conversion of old, unused office buildings to apartments or "lofts." Developer Tom Gilmore purchased a series of century-old buildings and converted them into lofts near Main and Spring streets, a development now known as the "Old Bank District." Other notable redevelopment projects in the Historic Core have included the Eastern Columbia Building, Broadway Trade Center, Higgins Building, The Security Building, the Pacific Electric Building, The Judson, and the Subway Terminal Building. As of 2005, redevelopment projects in downtown Los Angeles have been divided about evenly between rentals and condominiums; though projects near the Staples Center arena in the South Park neighborhood have been overwhelmingly dedicated to condominiums.

== Map of landmarks ==
Landmarks are shown on the following street grid of the Historic Core of Downtown Los Angeles.

Abbreviations

B.	Building
Ctr	Center
Dept Store, DS, ds	department store
H.	Hotel
HCM	L.A. Historic-Cultural Monument
🅿️	parking (lot or structure)
🏠	residential use
ret	retail
Th.	Theater/Theatre
T&SB	Trust and Savings Bank

Text, colors etc.

Blue	Banks
Brown	Residential apts./condos
Gold	Jewelry marts/shops
Green	Retail (except jewelry)
Orange	Hotels
Purple	Theaters, cinemas
Non-italic text	Current building name or tenant
Italic text	Demolished or previous name/tenant

Architectural styles

AD	Art Deco
BA	Beaux-Arts
BR	Baroque Revival
Chur	California Churrigueresque
CR	Classical Revival
GR	Gothic Revival
IRR	Italian Renaissance Revival
It	Italianate
NC	Neoclassical
Nov	Novelty architecture
Rom	Romanesque
RR	Renaissance Revival
SE	Second Empire
SG	Spanish Gothic
Vic	Victorian

Architects

AR	Alfred Rosenheim
ACM	Albert C. Martin, Sr.
BMP	B. Marcus Priteca
C&B	Curlett & Beelman
CB	Claud Beelman
CHB	Carroll Herkimer Brown
CHC	C. Howard Crane
D&F	Dennis & Farwell
EPC	Eli P. Clark
EM	Ernest McConnell
FN	Frederick Noonan
GAL	G. Albert Lansburgh
GEB	George Edwin Bergstrom
GW	George Wyman
HA	Harrison Albright
HT&W	Howard, Train & Williams

JM	Julia Morgan
JP	John Parkinson
LLS	Loy L. Smith
M&W	Morgan & Walls
MW&C	Morgan, Walls & Clements
MW&M	Morgan, Walls & Morgan
N&W	Norton & Wallis
P&B	Parkinson & Bergstrom
RB	Reid Bros. (James and Merritt)
RBY	Robert Brown Young
S&W	Schultze & Weaver
SH	Sumner Hunt
SOC	Stiles O. Clements
W&E	Walker & Eisen
WLW	William Lee Woollett

For the area north of Third Street, see Victorian Downtown Los Angeles
For the area to the west of Hill Street, see Financial District, Los Angeles

	H I L L S T R E E T H I L L S T R E E T H I L L S T R E E T H I L L S T R E E T H I L L S T R E E T H I L L S T R E E T H I L L S T R E E T H I L L S T R E E T	250 333 W. 3rd Conservative; Life B. aka Western & Mutual Life B. 1901-?d HT&W now 🅿️	259; 1895– SH Irvine Byrne B. 1899–1911 I. Magnin/ Myer Siegel; 2007– Pan American Lofts	B R O A D W A Y B R O A D W A Y B R O A D W A Y B R O A D W A Y B R O A D W A Y B R O A D W A Y B R O A D W A Y B R O A D W A Y B R O A D W A Y B R O A D W A Y B R O A D W A Y B R O A D W A Y		257; 1899 RB Douglas B. So. Pac. RR ticket office now Douglas Lofts	S P R I N G S T R E E T S P R I N G S T R E E T S P R I N G S T R E E T S P R I N G S T R E E T S P R I N G S T R E E T S P R I N G S T R E E T	256; Stimson B. 1893–1963 CHB now 🅿️		M A I N S T R E E T M A I N S T R E E T M A I N S T R E E T M A I N S T R E E T M A I N S T R E E T M A I N S T R E E T M A I N S T R E E T M A I N S T R E E T			L O S A N G E L E S S T R E E T L O S A N G E L E S S T R E E T L O S A N G E L E S S T R E E T L O S A N G E L E S S T R E E T L O S A N G E L E S S T R E E T	
	H I L L S T R E E T H I L L S T R E E T H I L L S T R E E T H I L L S T R E E T H I L L S T R E E T H I L L S T R E E T H I L L S T R E E T H I L L S T R E E T	THIRD ST.		B R O A D W A Y B R O A D W A Y B R O A D W A Y B R O A D W A Y B R O A D W A Y B R O A D W A Y B R O A D W A Y B R O A D W A Y B R O A D W A Y B R O A D W A Y B R O A D W A Y B R O A D W A Y	THIRD ST.		S P R I N G S T R E E T S P R I N G S T R E E T S P R I N G S T R E E T S P R I N G S T R E E T S P R I N G S T R E E T S P R I N G S T R E E T	THIRD ST.		M A I N S T R E E T M A I N S T R E E T M A I N S T R E E T M A I N S T R E E T M A I N S T R E E T M A I N S T R E E T M A I N S T R E E T M A I N S T R E E T	THIRD (orig. MAYO) ST.		L O S A N G E L E S S T R E E T L O S A N G E L E S S T R E E T L O S A N G E L E S S T R E E T L O S A N G E L E S S T R E E T L O S A N G E L E S S T R E E T	
	H I L L S T R E E T H I L L S T R E E T H I L L S T R E E T H I L L S T R E E T H I L L S T R E E T H I L L S T R E E T H I L L S T R E E T H I L L S T R E E T	300; F. P. Fay Bldg 1904–90d D&F now 🅿️ garage	301–313; 1895–1917d Muskegon Block; 1918 WLW/ACM Chur; Million Dollar Th.	B R O A D W A Y B R O A D W A Y B R O A D W A Y B R O A D W A Y B R O A D W A Y B R O A D W A Y B R O A D W A Y B R O A D W A Y B R O A D W A Y B R O A D W A Y B R O A D W A Y B R O A D W A Y	300–310; Bradbury B. 1893 SH/GW Wilson Court former alley 312-6; Gilbert Block c.1900–c.60 Central Th. 1929–c.57 now Guadalupe wedding chapel	301–311 Washington B. 1912 P&B	S P R I N G S T R E E T S P R I N G S T R E E T S P R I N G S T R E E T S P R I N G S T R E E T S P R I N G S T R E E T S P R I N G S T R E E T	300–4; J. B. Lankershim Bldg a.k.a. National Title Bldg; 1897–1959d RBY 301–9; Schwartz Block 1888-d Hotel Jackson 1890s Citizens Nat'l Bank/ Cotton Exch Bldg 1906-?d HA now Reagan State Bldg 1990		M A I N S T R E E T M A I N S T R E E T M A I N S T R E E T M A I N S T R E E T M A I N S T R E E T M A I N S T R E E T M A I N S T R E E T M A I N S T R E E T	300–4; Thom Block d Milan H. Blakesley H. Lewis drugstore now 🅿️	126–30 E. 3rd Empire/ Unique Th. 1905 RBY now 🅿️	L O S A N G E L E S S T R E E T L O S A N G E L E S S T R E E T L O S A N G E L E S S T R E E T L O S A N G E L E S S T R E E T L O S A N G E L E S S T R E E T	Toy District
Angels Flight	H I L L S T R E E T H I L L S T R E E T H I L L S T R E E T H I L L S T R E E T H I L L S T R E E T H I L L S T R E E T H I L L S T R E E T H I L L S T R E E T	312-322 / 315–325; 1897 JP Homer Laughlin B. ds 1898–1905 Coulter's ds 1905–17 Ville de Paris; 1917– Grand Central Market		B R O A D W A Y B R O A D W A Y B R O A D W A Y B R O A D W A Y B R O A D W A Y B R O A D W A Y B R O A D W A Y B R O A D W A Y B R O A D W A Y B R O A D W A Y B R O A D W A Y B R O A D W A Y	318-22; Blackstone B. 1906–pres RBY; Blackstone DS 1906-17; The Fair; Cozy Theater 1930s-50s 324-6 Shannon B. 328-30 Boos Bros Cafeteria; 332-4 So. Cal. Music; 336-8 Gray B. 1950s: Central Stationery & Printing Co.	337-41; Salisbury Block; 343-7; Hogan B.	S P R I N G S T R E E T S P R I N G S T R E E T S P R I N G S T R E E T S P R I N G S T R E E T S P R I N G S T R E E T S P R I N G S T R E E T	308–314 / 311–317; Round House a.k.a. Garden of Paradise 1850s–1889: c.1890–? 311–3 Pinney Bldg; 315–7 Pridham Block; 319–25 Turnverein Hall (Turnhalle)/ New Star Vaudeville Th. 335–9 Belasco Th.		M A I N S T R E E T M A I N S T R E E T M A I N S T R E E T M A I N S T R E E T M A I N S T R E E T M A I N S T R E E T M A I N S T R E E T M A I N S T R E E T	312–324; Panorama B. 1880s-1984 Rotunda (rear); 1887–1907: Siege of Paris panorama/ stables/icerink 1907–52: Adolphus/ Hippodrome Theatre now 🅿️		L O S A N G E L E S S T R E E T L O S A N G E L E S S T R E E T L O S A N G E L E S S T R E E T L O S A N G E L E S S T R E E T L O S A N G E L E S S T R E E T	Toy District
357–361; 1913–d Black B. now Pershing Sq.	H I L L S T R E E T H I L L S T R E E T H I L L S T R E E T H I L L S T R E E T H I L L S T R E E T H I L L S T R E E T H I L L S T R E E T H I L L S T R E E T		331–335 ds 1900–35 Jacoby Bros. 355–363; 1898/1902 JP Grant Bldg jewelers Montgomery Bros. shoes W. E. Cummings	B R O A D W A Y B R O A D W A Y B R O A D W A Y B R O A D W A Y B R O A D W A Y B R O A D W A Y B R O A D W A Y B R O A D W A Y B R O A D W A Y B R O A D W A Y B R O A D W A Y B R O A D W A Y	340 Trustee B. 1905 PB 350 O. T. Johnson Block 1895 It RBY 356 O. T. Johnson Bldg; 1902 JB Rom	361; Citizen M hotel 2021–	S P R I N G S T R E E T S P R I N G S T R E E T S P R I N G S T R E E T S P R I N G S T R E E T S P R I N G S T R E E T S P R I N G S T R E E T	354; Hellman Bldg; 1903 AR now HWH 🏠	103 W 4th 1897 M&W; Hotel Van Nuys now Hotel Barclay🏠	M A I N S T R E E T M A I N S T R E E T M A I N S T R E E T M A I N S T R E E T M A I N S T R E E T M A I N S T R E E T M A I N S T R E E T M A I N S T R E E T	332–346; Hotel Westminster; 1888–1960d RBY now Medallion Apts🏠	335–399; Germaine; Bldg d Edison H. now retail, 🅿️	L O S A N G E L E S S T R E E T L O S A N G E L E S S T R E E T L O S A N G E L E S S T R E E T L O S A N G E L E S S T R E E T L O S A N G E L E S S T R E E T	Toy District
	H I L L S T R E E T H I L L S T R E E T H I L L S T R E E T H I L L S T R E E T H I L L S T R E E T H I L L S T R E E T H I L L S T R E E T H I L L S T R E E T	FOURTH ST.		B R O A D W A Y B R O A D W A Y B R O A D W A Y B R O A D W A Y B R O A D W A Y B R O A D W A Y B R O A D W A Y B R O A D W A Y B R O A D W A Y B R O A D W A Y B R O A D W A Y B R O A D W A Y	FOURTH ST.		S P R I N G S T R E E T S P R I N G S T R E E T S P R I N G S T R E E T S P R I N G S T R E E T S P R I N G S T R E E T S P R I N G S T R E E T	FOURTH ST.		M A I N S T R E E T M A I N S T R E E T M A I N S T R E E T M A I N S T R E E T M A I N S T R E E T M A I N S T R E E T M A I N S T R E E T M A I N S T R E E T	FOURTH ST.		L O S A N G E L E S S T R E E T L O S A N G E L E S S T R E E T L O S A N G E L E S S T R E E T L O S A N G E L E S S T R E E T L O S A N G E L E S S T R E E T	
	H I L L S T R E E T H I L L S T R E E T H I L L S T R E E T H I L L S T R E E T H I L L S T R E E T H I L L S T R E E T H I L L S T R E E T H I L L S T R E E T	400–412; Hotel Clarendon/ Hotel Sherman; 1895–1939 now 🅿️ lot 414–434; Wilson Bldg/ Occidental Hotel/ Clark Hotel ?–1913 401–5; J. A. Williams; Dry; Goods/ Broadway; Department; Store; Building; 1895– 1914d 1915: 401–23 B'way, 414–34 Hill were joined as the: Broadway Dept Store Bldg 1915 P&B; 1999 renamed Junípero Serra B. #2 The Broadway Department Store 1896–1973; State of California offices 1999–present		B R O A D W A Y B R O A D W A Y B R O A D W A Y B R O A D W A Y B R O A D W A Y B R O A D W A Y B R O A D W A Y B R O A D W A Y B R O A D W A Y B R O A D W A Y B R O A D W A Y B R O A D W A Y	400; Mason B. c.1897–d Perla on Broadway 🏠 2020	Angelus Hotel 1901–56d JP now 🅿️	S P R I N G S T R E E T S P R I N G S T R E E T S P R I N G S T R E E T S P R I N G S T R E E T S P R I N G S T R E E T S P R I N G S T R E E T	400; Continental; Bldg; 1902 JP/GB BA a.k.a. Braly Block now Continental Lofts 410; Isaias W. Hellman Bldg Annex; 1914 MW&M BA now Hellman Lofts 🏠	401; Farmers and Merchants Bank Bldg; 1905 MW&M BA 411; Isaias W. Hellman Bldg; 1905 MW&M BA now Hellman Lofts 🏠	M A I N S T R E E T M A I N S T R E E T M A I N S T R E E T M A I N S T R E E T M A I N S T R E E T M A I N S T R E E T M A I N S T R E E T M A I N S T R E E T	400; San; Fernando; B. 1906 IRR		L O S A N G E L E S S T R E E T L O S A N G E L E S S T R E E T L O S A N G E L E S S T R E E T L O S A N G E L E S S T R E E T L O S A N G E L E S S T R E E T	Toy District
417; Subway; Terminal; B. 1925–55 Pacific; Electric now res Metro 417	H I L L S T R E E T H I L L S T R E E T H I L L S T R E E T H I L L S T R E E T H I L L S T R E E T H I L L S T R E E T H I L L S T R E E T H I L L S T R E E T	436–8; Boos Bros. Cafeteria St. Clarenden H.	443–7 ?–1911 Brockton Shoes ds 1911–22 Myer Siegel ds 1922-c.1927 Bon Marché; 5&10¢ 1927–mid-90s: J. J. Newberry's; Fallas Paredes ds 1996-2022	B R O A D W A Y B R O A D W A Y B R O A D W A Y B R O A D W A Y B R O A D W A Y B R O A D W A Y B R O A D W A Y B R O A D W A Y B R O A D W A Y B R O A D W A Y B R O A D W A Y B R O A D W A Y	424; Judson C. Rive B. 1907	433; Title Insurance & Trust Co B. 1928; UCLA Extension	S P R I N G S T R E E T S P R I N G S T R E E T S P R I N G S T R E E T S P R I N G S T R E E T S P R I N G S T R E E T S P R I N G S T R E E T	416; Stowell/ El Dorado Hotel 1913 FN; El Dorado Lofts Dog Park		M A I N S T R E E T M A I N S T R E E T M A I N S T R E E T M A I N S T R E E T M A I N S T R E E T M A I N S T R E E T M A I N S T R E E T M A I N S T R E E T			L O S A N G E L E S S T R E E T L O S A N G E L E S S T R E E T L O S A N G E L E S S T R E E T L O S A N G E L E S S T R E E T L O S A N G E L E S S T R E E T	Toy District
(411 W. 5th); 1929-30 P&P AD; Title; Guarantee; B. now 🏠	H I L L S T R E E T H I L L S T R E E T H I L L S T R E E T H I L L S T R E E T H I L L S T R E E T H I L L S T R E E T H I L L S T R E E T H I L L S T R E E T		(515 W. 5th); 451–459; 1913 JP/GEB RR; Metropolitan B. 1914–34 Owl Drugs; 1913–26 Public Library; Foreman & Clark ds c.1915–28 1916–28 Janss land dev. Fallas Paredes ds 1996-2022; Now small/vacant retail, Downtown Metro Lofts	B R O A D W A Y B R O A D W A Y B R O A D W A Y B R O A D W A Y B R O A D W A Y B R O A D W A Y B R O A D W A Y B R O A D W A Y B R O A D W A Y B R O A D W A Y B R O A D W A Y B R O A D W A Y	Chester Williams B. 1926	453; Spring Arts Tower P&B; Citizens Nat'l Bank 1915–63; Crocker Bank 1963–70s Pacific Stock Exchange 1970s Now art studios, The Last Bookstore	S P R I N G S T R E E T S P R I N G S T R E E T S P R I N G S T R E E T S P R I N G S T R E E T S P R I N G S T R E E T S P R I N G S T R E E T	460; Rowan B. 1912; The Rowan 🏠	451; 1914 P&B BA; Hotel; Rosslyn now Rosslyn Lofts	M A I N S T R E E T M A I N S T R E E T M A I N S T R E E T M A I N S T R E E T M A I N S T R E E T M A I N S T R E E T M A I N S T R E E T M A I N S T R E E T		121 E. 5th King; Edward; Hotel; 1906 P&B now 🏠.	L O S A N G E L E S S T R E E T L O S A N G E L E S S T R E E T L O S A N G E L E S S T R E E T L O S A N G E L E S S T R E E T L O S A N G E L E S S T R E E T	Toy District
	H I L L S T R E E T H I L L S T R E E T H I L L S T R E E T H I L L S T R E E T H I L L S T R E E T H I L L S T R E E T H I L L S T R E E T H I L L S T R E E T	FIFTH ST.		B R O A D W A Y B R O A D W A Y B R O A D W A Y B R O A D W A Y B R O A D W A Y B R O A D W A Y B R O A D W A Y B R O A D W A Y B R O A D W A Y B R O A D W A Y B R O A D W A Y B R O A D W A Y	FIFTH ST.		S P R I N G S T R E E T S P R I N G S T R E E T S P R I N G S T R E E T S P R I N G S T R E E T S P R I N G S T R E E T S P R I N G S T R E E T	FIFTH ST.		M A I N S T R E E T M A I N S T R E E T M A I N S T R E E T M A I N S T R E E T M A I N S T R E E T M A I N S T R E E T M A I N S T R E E T M A I N S T R E E T	FIFTH ST.		L O S A N G E L E S S T R E E T L O S A N G E L E S S T R E E T L O S A N G E L E S S T R E E T L O S A N G E L E S S T R E E T L O S A N G E L E S S T R E E T	
PERSHING; SQUARE	H I L L S T R E E T H I L L S T R E E T H I L L S T R E E T H I L L S T R E E T H I L L S T R E E T H I L L S T R E E T H I L L S T R E E T H I L L S T R E E T	Pershing Square	Fifth Street Store ds	B R O A D W A Y B R O A D W A Y B R O A D W A Y B R O A D W A Y B R O A D W A Y B R O A D W A Y B R O A D W A Y B R O A D W A Y B R O A D W A Y B R O A D W A Y B R O A D W A Y B R O A D W A Y	518 Roxie Th. 528 Cameo Th. 534 Arcade Th. now retail	501; Hotel Alexandria 1906	S P R I N G S T R E E T S P R I N G S T R E E T S P R I N G S T R E E T S P R I N G S T R E E T S P R I N G S T R E E T S P R I N G S T R E E T	510; Security Bldg 1907 PB; Security T&SB now Security Bldg Lofts	514; Hotel; Rosslyn; Annex	M A I N S T R E E T M A I N S T R E E T M A I N S T R E E T M A I N S T R E E T M A I N S T R E E T M A I N S T R E E T M A I N S T R E E T M A I N S T R E E T	500–2; Charnock; Block; 1889 Vic/SE; Pershing Hotel now New; Pershing; Apts	501; Baltimore; Hotel 1910 now 🏠	L O S A N G E L E S S T R E E T L O S A N G E L E S S T R E E T L O S A N G E L E S S T R E E T L O S A N G E L E S S T R E E T L O S A N G E L E S S T R E E T	
PERSHING; SQUARE	H I L L S T R E E T H I L L S T R E E T H I L L S T R E E T H I L L S T R E E T H I L L S T R E E T H I L L S T R E E T H I L L S T R E E T H I L L S T R E E T			B R O A D W A Y B R O A D W A Y B R O A D W A Y B R O A D W A Y B R O A D W A Y B R O A D W A Y B R O A D W A Y B R O A D W A Y B R O A D W A Y B R O A D W A Y B R O A D W A Y B R O A D W A Y	538–546 Spring Arcade 537–543 (a.k.a. Broadway Arcade) 543; Desmond's ds 1915–24		S P R I N G S T R E E T S P R I N G S T R E E T S P R I N G S T R E E T S P R I N G S T R E E T S P R I N G S T R E E T S P R I N G S T R E E T	514; Security T&SB 1916 JP BA now L.A. Theater Center		M A I N S T R E E T M A I N S T R E E T M A I N S T R E E T M A I N S T R E E T M A I N S T R E E T M A I N S T R E E T M A I N S T R E E T M A I N S T R E E T	545 🅿️	550; Topaz Apts 2018	L O S A N G E L E S S T R E E T L O S A N G E L E S S T R E E T L O S A N G E L E S S T R E E T L O S A N G E L E S S T R E E T L O S A N G E L E S S T R E E T	
PERSHING; SQUARE	H I L L S T R E E T H I L L S T R E E T H I L L S T R E E T H I L L S T R E E T H I L L S T R E E T H I L L S T R E E T H I L L S T R E E T H I L L S T R E E T	550; Paramount Th. International; Jewelry Ctr	555–61 ds Swelldom	B R O A D W A Y B R O A D W A Y B R O A D W A Y B R O A D W A Y B R O A D W A Y B R O A D W A Y B R O A D W A Y B R O A D W A Y B R O A D W A Y B R O A D W A Y B R O A D W A Y B R O A D W A Y	556–558 ds Silverwoods (1904–74) now Broadway Jewelry Mart	(215 W. Spring); 561; 1910 JP/GEB Trust & Savings Bank Bldg; 1910 L.A. T&SB; 1922 Pacific SW T&SB now Randolph Lofts	S P R I N G S T R E E T S P R I N G S T R E E T S P R I N G S T R E E T S P R I N G S T R E E T S P R I N G S T R E E T S P R I N G S T R E E T	548; Marley Lofts		M A I N S T R E E T M A I N S T R E E T M A I N S T R E E T M A I N S T R E E T M A I N S T R E E T M A I N S T R E E T M A I N S T R E E T M A I N S T R E E T	560; Santa Fe B. 1908 M&W BA now Santa Fe Lofts		L O S A N G E L E S S T R E E T L O S A N G E L E S S T R E E T L O S A N G E L E S S T R E E T L O S A N G E L E S S T R E E T L O S A N G E L E S S T R E E T	
	H I L L S T R E E T H I L L S T R E E T H I L L S T R E E T H I L L S T R E E T H I L L S T R E E T H I L L S T R E E T H I L L S T R E E T H I L L S T R E E T	SIXTH ST.		B R O A D W A Y B R O A D W A Y B R O A D W A Y B R O A D W A Y B R O A D W A Y B R O A D W A Y B R O A D W A Y B R O A D W A Y B R O A D W A Y B R O A D W A Y B R O A D W A Y B R O A D W A Y	SIXTH ST.		S P R I N G S T R E E T S P R I N G S T R E E T S P R I N G S T R E E T S P R I N G S T R E E T S P R I N G S T R E E T S P R I N G S T R E E T	SIXTH ST.		M A I N S T R E E T M A I N S T R E E T M A I N S T R E E T M A I N S T R E E T M A I N S T R E E T M A I N S T R E E T M A I N S T R E E T M A I N S T R E E T	SIXTH ST.		L O S A N G E L E S S T R E E T L O S A N G E L E S S T R E E T L O S A N G E L E S S T R E E T L O S A N G E L E S S T R E E T L O S A N G E L E S S T R E E T	
Consolidated; Realty; B. 1908/35 now California Jewelry Mart Sun Realty B. 1931; L.A. Jewelry; Center 635; Harris & Frank B. 1925; Harris & Frank 1925–50 now Wholesale; Jewelry; Exchange	H I L L S T R E E T H I L L S T R E E T H I L L S T R E E T H I L L S T R E E T H I L L S T R E E T H I L L S T R E E T H I L L S T R E E T H I L L S T R E E T	606; Western; Jewelry; Mart 608; William Fox B. 1932; Fox; Jewelry; Plaza	601-605; 1907 P&B H. Jevne Co B. grocer 1907–20 H. Jevne; 1921–31 Bedell Dept Store; 1936–8 Jacoby's; 1940–? Zukor's now Three One Four apts 615; Los Angeles Th.	B R O A D W A Y B R O A D W A Y B R O A D W A Y B R O A D W A Y B R O A D W A Y B R O A D W A Y B R O A D W A Y B R O A D W A Y B R O A D W A Y B R O A D W A Y B R O A D W A Y B R O A D W A Y	600–610; Walter P. Story B. 1909 MW&C BA; Mullen & Bluett ds 616; Desmond's ds 620; Schaber's cafeteria 630 Palace Th. 1911 GAL RR 644; Joseph E Carr B. 1909 HH; W & J. Sloane 1909–1935; Brooks Clothing Co 1935–47; Harris & Frank 1947–80 648; Boos Bros. Cafeteria 1916; Clifton's Cafeteria 1935–	601; Hotel Hayward 621; E. F. Hutton 1931 625; California Canadian Bank 1923 639; Barclays Bank 1919	S P R I N G S T R E E T S P R I N G S T R E E T S P R I N G S T R E E T S P R I N G S T R E E T S P R I N G S T R E E T S P R I N G S T R E E T	600; United California Bank B. 1961 CB; U.C.B. HQ 1961–73 now Thurman Lofts 618; Stock Exchange B. 1931 P&P CM; L. A. Stock Exchange; Pacific Stock Exch. now ExchangeLA nightclub 626; Mortgage Guaranty B. 1913; City Lofts 632–4; Banks & Huntley B. 1930 P&P AD		M A I N S T R E E T M A I N S T R E E T M A I N S T R E E T M A I N S T R E E T M A I N S T R E E T M A I N S T R E E T M A I N S T R E E T M A I N S T R E E T	610; Pacific; Electric; B. 1905; Pacific; Electric; Lofts 640; Hotel Cecil; 1924–pres LLS		L O S A N G E L E S S T R E E T L O S A N G E L E S S T R E E T L O S A N G E L E S S T R E E T L O S A N G E L E S S T R E E T L O S A N G E L E S S T R E E T	
651–7; 410 W. 7th 1920 BMP BA; Pantages/ Warner Bros Th now Jewelry; Theater Center	H I L L S T R E E T H I L L S T R E E T H I L L S T R E E T H I L L S T R E E T H I L L S T R E E T H I L L S T R E E T H I L L S T R E E T H I L L S T R E E T	640–50 / 639–59; Bullock's ds 1907 P&B now St. Vincent Jewelry Ctr		B R O A D W A Y B R O A D W A Y B R O A D W A Y B R O A D W A Y B R O A D W A Y B R O A D W A Y B R O A D W A Y B R O A D W A Y B R O A D W A Y B R O A D W A Y B R O A D W A Y B R O A D W A Y	656–666 (219 W 7th); Haas B. 1915 MW&M BA now 🏠, hotel, retail	215 W. 7th 651–3; Bartlett Bldg; 1911 P&B; Union Oil HQ; 1911–23; 2002–pres 🏠	S P R I N G S T R E E T S P R I N G S T R E E T S P R I N G S T R E E T S P R I N G S T R E E T S P R I N G S T R E E T S P R I N G S T R E E T	650; Bank of America Bldg; 1924 S&W now Jaide Lofts		M A I N S T R E E T M A I N S T R E E T M A I N S T R E E T M A I N S T R E E T M A I N S T R E E T M A I N S T R E E T M A I N S T R E E T M A I N S T R E E T			L O S A N G E L E S S T R E E T L O S A N G E L E S S T R E E T L O S A N G E L E S S T R E E T L O S A N G E L E S S T R E E T L O S A N G E L E S S T R E E T	
	H I L L S T R E E T H I L L S T R E E T H I L L S T R E E T H I L L S T R E E T H I L L S T R E E T H I L L S T R E E T H I L L S T R E E T H I L L S T R E E T	SEVENTH ST.		B R O A D W A Y B R O A D W A Y B R O A D W A Y B R O A D W A Y B R O A D W A Y B R O A D W A Y B R O A D W A Y B R O A D W A Y B R O A D W A Y B R O A D W A Y B R O A D W A Y B R O A D W A Y	SEVENTH ST.		S P R I N G S T R E E T S P R I N G S T R E E T S P R I N G S T R E E T S P R I N G S T R E E T S P R I N G S T R E E T S P R I N G S T R E E T	SEVENTH ST.		M A I N S T R E E T M A I N S T R E E T M A I N S T R E E T M A I N S T R E E T M A I N S T R E E T M A I N S T R E E T M A I N S T R E E T M A I N S T R E E T	SEVENTH ST.		L O S A N G E L E S S T R E E T L O S A N G E L E S S T R E E T L O S A N G E L E S S T R E E T L O S A N G E L E S S T R E E T L O S A N G E L E S S T R E E T	
701; Foreman & Clark B. 1928 C&B AD/NG; Foreman & Clark ds	H I L L S T R E E T H I L L S T R E E T H I L L S T R E E T H I L L S T R E E T H I L L S T R E E T H I L L S T R E E T H I L L S T R E E T H I L L S T R E E T		703 State Th.	B R O A D W A Y B R O A D W A Y B R O A D W A Y B R O A D W A Y B R O A D W A Y B R O A D W A Y B R O A D W A Y B R O A D W A Y B R O A D W A Y B R O A D W A Y B R O A D W A Y B R O A D W A Y	700; Hotel Lankershim 1905–80s d now 🅿️ w/1st floor retail 720; Z. L. Parmelee B. 1907; Parmelee Co. gas/electric fixtures 722; Sassony B. 1909 Barker Bros. furniture 1909–1936 at 724-732; 728–734 is now 🅿️ w/1st floor retail 740; Garland B. 1913 MW&M NC; Globe Th. orig. Morosco Th.	701; Van; Nuys; Bldg; M&W 1911 RR now Van; Nuys; Apts	S P R I N G S T R E E T S P R I N G S T R E E T S P R I N G S T R E E T S P R I N G S T R E E T S P R I N G S T R E E T S P R I N G S T R E E T	700–4; 140 W. 7th Financial; Center; Bldg; N&W 1924 BA		M A I N S T R E E T M A I N S T R E E T M A I N S T R E E T M A I N S T R E E T M A I N S T R E E T M A I N S T R E E T M A I N S T R E E T M A I N S T R E E T	700; Dearden's ds 1909-2017		L O S A N G E L E S S T R E E T L O S A N G E L E S S T R E E T L O S A N G E L E S S T R E E T L O S A N G E L E S S T R E E T L O S A N G E L E S S T R E E T	
757–61; 401–15 W. 8th Title Insurance & Trust Co ?–1928; Garfield Bldg; 1930–pres	H I L L S T R E E T H I L L S T R E E T H I L L S T R E E T H I L L S T R E E T H I L L S T R E E T H I L L S T R E E T H I L L S T R E E T H I L L S T R E E T	Union Bank & Trust Co. B. 1922 C&B now Union Lofts		B R O A D W A Y B R O A D W A Y B R O A D W A Y B R O A D W A Y B R O A D W A Y B R O A D W A Y B R O A D W A Y B R O A D W A Y B R O A D W A Y B R O A D W A Y B R O A D W A Y B R O A D W A Y	756; Chapman B. 1912 EM BA HCM #899 orig. L.A. Investment Co B. now Chapman Flats	755; Griffin on Spring 🏠 24 fl. 2018	S P R I N G S T R E E T S P R I N G S T R E E T S P R I N G S T R E E T S P R I N G S T R E E T S P R I N G S T R E E T S P R I N G S T R E E T	756 Great; Republic; Life B. 1927 W&E BA; Gr. Rep. Life now Gr. Rep. Lofts		M A I N S T R E E T M A I N S T R E E T M A I N S T R E E T M A I N S T R E E T M A I N S T R E E T M A I N S T R E E T M A I N S T R E E T M A I N S T R E E T			L O S A N G E L E S S T R E E T L O S A N G E L E S S T R E E T L O S A N G E L E S S T R E E T L O S A N G E L E S S T R E E T L O S A N G E L E S S T R E E T	
	H I L L S T R E E T H I L L S T R E E T H I L L S T R E E T H I L L S T R E E T H I L L S T R E E T H I L L S T R E E T H I L L S T R E E T H I L L S T R E E T	EIGHTH ST.		B R O A D W A Y B R O A D W A Y B R O A D W A Y B R O A D W A Y B R O A D W A Y B R O A D W A Y B R O A D W A Y B R O A D W A Y B R O A D W A Y B R O A D W A Y B R O A D W A Y B R O A D W A Y	EIGHTH ST.		S P R I N G S T R E E T S P R I N G S T R E E T S P R I N G S T R E E T S P R I N G S T R E E T S P R I N G S T R E E T S P R I N G S T R E E T	EIGHTH ST.		M A I N S T R E E T M A I N S T R E E T M A I N S T R E E T M A I N S T R E E T M A I N S T R E E T M A I N S T R E E T M A I N S T R E E T M A I N S T R E E T	EIGHTH ST.		L O S A N G E L E S S T R E E T L O S A N G E L E S S T R E E T L O S A N G E L E S S T R E E T L O S A N G E L E S S T R E E T L O S A N G E L E S S T R E E T	
825; 1922–63 RKO; Hillstreet; Th. now 820 Olive / 825 S. Hill 🏠	H I L L S T R E E T H I L L S T R E E T H I L L S T R E E T H I L L S T R E E T H I L L S T R E E T H I L L S T R E E T H I L L S T R E E T H I L L S T R E E T	830 / 801; May Company B. Hamburger's ds 1908–1923; May Company ds 1923–1986; Broadway Trade Center –2015 retail, garment manufacturing planned retail, offices, hotel		B R O A D W A Y B R O A D W A Y B R O A D W A Y B R O A D W A Y B R O A D W A Y B R O A D W A Y B R O A D W A Y B R O A D W A Y B R O A D W A Y B R O A D W A Y B R O A D W A Y B R O A D W A Y	802 Tower Th. 1927 BR 812 Rialto Th. 1917 AD/CR 842 Orpheum Th. (1926 BA)	200 W. 8th 1923 Lane Mortgage B. now The Craftsman	S P R I N G S T R E E T S P R I N G S T R E E T S P R I N G S T R E E T S P R I N G S T R E E T S P R I N G S T R E E T S P R I N G S T R E E T	810; National; City; Tower; 1924 AW/PE		M A I N S T R E E T M A I N S T R E E T M A I N S T R E E T M A I N S T R E E T M A I N S T R E E T M A I N S T R E E T M A I N S T R E E T M A I N S T R E E T	810; California; Th. 1918–90 BA		L O S A N G E L E S S T R E E T L O S A N G E L E S S T R E E T L O S A N G E L E S S T R E E T L O S A N G E L E S S T R E E T L O S A N G E L E S S T R E E T	824; Gray B.
855; Coast Fed. Savings; B. 1926 JM	H I L L S T R E E T H I L L S T R E E T H I L L S T R E E T H I L L S T R E E T H I L L S T R E E T H I L L S T R E E T H I L L S T R E E T H I L L S T R E E T	850; The Alexan planned 26 fl. 🏠	849; Eastern Columbia B. 1930 CB AD; 1930–57 Eastern Col. DS; 2006–pres Eastern Col. Lofts	B R O A D W A Y B R O A D W A Y B R O A D W A Y B R O A D W A Y B R O A D W A Y B R O A D W A Y B R O A D W A Y B R O A D W A Y B R O A D W A Y B R O A D W A Y B R O A D W A Y B R O A D W A Y		833; City Club B. 1925 LLS	S P R I N G S T R E E T S P R I N G S T R E E T S P R I N G S T R E E T S P R I N G S T R E E T S P R I N G S T R E E T S P R I N G S T R E E T			M A I N S T R E E T M A I N S T R E E T M A I N S T R E E T M A I N S T R E E T M A I N S T R E E T M A I N S T R E E T M A I N S T R E E T M A I N S T R E E T		851; Harris; Newmark; B. 1926 C&B RR	L O S A N G E L E S S T R E E T L O S A N G E L E S S T R E E T L O S A N G E L E S S T R E E T L O S A N G E L E S S T R E E T L O S A N G E L E S S T R E E T	860; Cooper B. 1926 C&B; Cooper Design Space
	H I L L S T R E E T H I L L S T R E E T H I L L S T R E E T H I L L S T R E E T H I L L S T R E E T H I L L S T R E E T H I L L S T R E E T H I L L S T R E E T	NINTH ST.		B R O A D W A Y B R O A D W A Y B R O A D W A Y B R O A D W A Y B R O A D W A Y B R O A D W A Y B R O A D W A Y B R O A D W A Y B R O A D W A Y B R O A D W A Y B R O A D W A Y B R O A D W A Y	NINTH ST.					M A I N S T R E E T M A I N S T R E E T M A I N S T R E E T M A I N S T R E E T M A I N S T R E E T M A I N S T R E E T M A I N S T R E E T M A I N S T R E E T	NINTH ST.		L O S A N G E L E S S T R E E T L O S A N G E L E S S T R E E T L O S A N G E L E S S T R E E T L O S A N G E L E S S T R E E T L O S A N G E L E S S T R E E T	
small retail	H I L L S T R E E T H I L L S T R E E T H I L L S T R E E T H I L L S T R E E T H I L L S T R E E T H I L L S T R E E T H I L L S T R E E T H I L L S T R E E T	912; May Co Garage B.1926 939; South; Park 🏠	901; Blackstone's ds 1907–1917 1927 W&E/CHC SG 929; Cal. Petroleum/Texaco B. 2014–24 Ace Hotel now STILE hotel 1927–89 United Artists Th. 1989 Gene Scott's church 2014–24 Th. at Ace Hotel now United Th.	B R O A D W A Y B R O A D W A Y B R O A D W A Y B R O A D W A Y B R O A D W A Y B R O A D W A Y B R O A D W A Y B R O A D W A Y B R O A D W A Y B R O A D W A Y B R O A D W A Y B R O A D W A Y						M A I N S T R E E T M A I N S T R E E T M A I N S T R E E T M A I N S T R E E T M A I N S T R E E T M A I N S T R E E T M A I N S T R E E T M A I N S T R E E T			L O S A N G E L E S S T R E E T L O S A N G E L E S S T R E E T L O S A N G E L E S S T R E E T L O S A N G E L E S S T R E E T L O S A N G E L E S S T R E E T	910; Gerry; B. 1947 SM
	H I L L S T R E E T H I L L S T R E E T H I L L S T R E E T H I L L S T R E E T H I L L S T R E E T H I L L S T R E E T H I L L S T R E E T H I L L S T R E E T	OLYMPIC BL.		B R O A D W A Y B R O A D W A Y B R O A D W A Y B R O A D W A Y B R O A D W A Y B R O A D W A Y B R O A D W A Y B R O A D W A Y B R O A D W A Y B R O A D W A Y B R O A D W A Y B R O A D W A Y	(formerly TENTH ST.)					M A I N S T R E E T M A I N S T R E E T M A I N S T R E E T M A I N S T R E E T M A I N S T R E E T M A I N S T R E E T M A I N S T R E E T M A I N S T R E E T	OLYMPIC BL.		L O S A N G E L E S S T R E E T L O S A N G E L E S S T R E E T L O S A N G E L E S S T R E E T L O S A N G E L E S S T R E E T L O S A N G E L E S S T R E E T	
	H I L L S T R E E T H I L L S T R E E T H I L L S T R E E T H I L L S T R E E T H I L L S T R E E T H I L L S T R E E T H I L L S T R E E T H I L L S T R E E T	1000 53 fl 🏠 Olympic & Hill		B R O A D W A Y B R O A D W A Y B R O A D W A Y B R O A D W A Y B R O A D W A Y B R O A D W A Y B R O A D W A Y B R O A D W A Y B R O A D W A Y B R O A D W A Y B R O A D W A Y B R O A D W A Y	1026 S. Broadway Broadway Palace Apts 2017 S. Hill 1001–51					M A I N S T R E E T M A I N S T R E E T M A I N S T R E E T M A I N S T R E E T M A I N S T R E E T M A I N S T R E E T M A I N S T R E E T M A I N S T R E E T			L O S A N G E L E S S T R E E T L O S A N G E L E S S T R E E T L O S A N G E L E S S T R E E T L O S A N G E L E S S T R E E T L O S A N G E L E S S T R E E T	
	H I L L S T R E E T H I L L S T R E E T H I L L S T R E E T H I L L S T R E E T H I L L S T R E E T H I L L S T R E E T H I L L S T R E E T H I L L S T R E E T	1038 1927 SOC; Mayan Th.	1023 1925 W&E BA; Western Pacific B.	B R O A D W A Y B R O A D W A Y B R O A D W A Y B R O A D W A Y B R O A D W A Y B R O A D W A Y B R O A D W A Y B R O A D W A Y B R O A D W A Y B R O A D W A Y B R O A D W A Y B R O A D W A Y	1026 S. Broadway Broadway Palace Apts 2017 S. Hill 1001–51					M A I N S T R E E T M A I N S T R E E T M A I N S T R E E T M A I N S T R E E T M A I N S T R E E T M A I N S T R E E T M A I N S T R E E T M A I N S T R E E T			L O S A N G E L E S S T R E E T L O S A N G E L E S S T R E E T L O S A N G E L E S S T R E E T L O S A N G E L E S S T R E E T L O S A N G E L E S S T R E E T	
1061; White Log bar/rest. 1932 Nov	H I L L S T R E E T H I L L S T R E E T H I L L S T R E E T H I L L S T R E E T H I L L S T R E E T H I L L S T R E E T H I L L S T R E E T H I L L S T R E E T	1050; 1926 MWC Chur; Belasco Th.		B R O A D W A Y B R O A D W A Y B R O A D W A Y B R O A D W A Y B R O A D W A Y B R O A D W A Y B R O A D W A Y B R O A D W A Y B R O A D W A Y B R O A D W A Y B R O A D W A Y B R O A D W A Y	1060; L. A. Railway HQ 1925 now Hoxton Hotel					M A I N S T R E E T M A I N S T R E E T M A I N S T R E E T M A I N S T R E E T M A I N S T R E E T M A I N S T R E E T M A I N S T R E E T M A I N S T R E E T			L O S A N G E L E S S T R E E T L O S A N G E L E S S T R E E T L O S A N G E L E S S T R E E T L O S A N G E L E S S T R E E T L O S A N G E L E S S T R E E T	
	H I L L S T R E E T H I L L S T R E E T H I L L S T R E E T H I L L S T R E E T H I L L S T R E E T H I L L S T R E E T H I L L S T R E E T H I L L S T R E E T	ELEVENTH ST.		B R O A D W A Y B R O A D W A Y B R O A D W A Y B R O A D W A Y B R O A D W A Y B R O A D W A Y B R O A D W A Y B R O A D W A Y B R O A D W A Y B R O A D W A Y B R O A D W A Y B R O A D W A Y	ELEVENTH ST.					M A I N S T R E E T M A I N S T R E E T M A I N S T R E E T M A I N S T R E E T M A I N S T R E E T M A I N S T R E E T M A I N S T R E E T M A I N S T R E E T	ELEVENTH ST.		L O S A N G E L E S S T R E E T L O S A N G E L E S S T R E E T L O S A N G E L E S S T R E E T L O S A N G E L E S S T R E E T L O S A N G E L E S S T R E E T	
1111; Sky Trees; Tower planned 43-fl. 🏠	H I L L S T R E E T H I L L S T R E E T H I L L S T R E E T H I L L S T R E E T H I L L S T R E E T H I L L S T R E E T H I L L S T R E E T H I L L S T R E E T		(146 W. 11th St.) 1101; 1914 Herald Examiner B. newspaper 1914–89 Herald Examiner	B R O A D W A Y B R O A D W A Y B R O A D W A Y B R O A D W A Y B R O A D W A Y B R O A D W A Y B R O A D W A Y B R O A D W A Y B R O A D W A Y B R O A D W A Y B R O A D W A Y B R O A D W A Y	1100; Commercial Club (Chamber of Commerce social club) 1926 C&B RR now Proper Hotel			1101; 110 W. 11th Harris B. 1923 BA		M A I N S T R E E T M A I N S T R E E T M A I N S T R E E T M A I N S T R E E T M A I N S T R E E T M A I N S T R E E T M A I N S T R E E T M A I N S T R E E T			L O S A N G E L E S S T R E E T L O S A N G E L E S S T R E E T L O S A N G E L E S S T R E E T L O S A N G E L E S S T R E E T L O S A N G E L E S S T R E E T	

== Points of Interest ==
- LOST-DTLA, 718 S Hill Street

== See also ==
=== Within Downtown Los Angeles ===
- Broadway (Los Angeles)
- Broadway Theater District
- Central Business District, Los Angeles (1880-1899)
- Old Bank District
- Spring Street Financial District
