= Paramount Theatre (Los Angeles) =

Movie theater in downtown Los Angeles, California, United States (1923–1960)

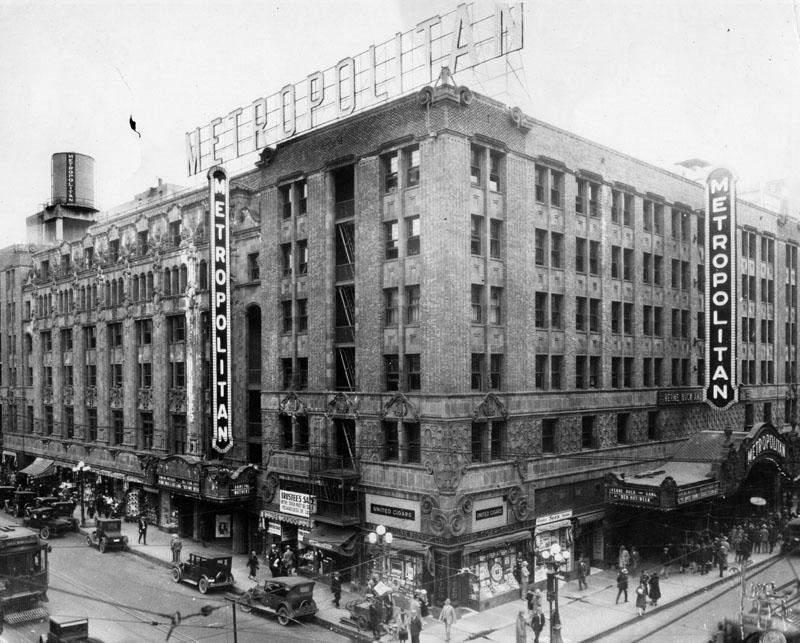
- The building in 1925
- Interactive map of Paramount Theatre
- Former names: Metropolitan Theater
- Address: 323 W. 6th and 536 S. Hill Street; Los Angeles
- Coordinates: 34.04740°N 118.2529°W
- Capacity: 3600+
- Type: Movie palace

Construction
- Built: 1921–1923
- Renovated: 1952
- Closed: 1960
- Demolished: 1962
- Years active: 1923–1960
- Architects: George Edwin Bergstrom; William Lee Woollett

Paramount Theatre (formerly Metropolitan Theater or Grauman's Metropolitan Theater; also known as Paramount Downtown) was a movie palace and office building located at 323 W 6th Street and 536 S Hill Street, across the street from Pershing Square, in the historic core of downtown Los Angeles. It had an additional entrance connecting it to the Broadway Theater District and it was the largest movie theater in Los Angeles for many years.

== History ==
Downtown Los Angeles's Paramount Theatre opened as Grauman's Metropolitan Theatre on January 26, 1923. The building was financed by the Hill Street Fireproof Building Company, designed by George Edwin Bergstrom with the theater and building interior designed by William Lee Woollett, all for impresario Sid Grauman, known at the time for the Million Dollar Theatre and best remembered today for his two Hollywood movie palaces: the Chinese and Egyptian theaters. The theater's first screening was the film premiere of Gloria Swanson's My American Wife, with the actress in attendance. Fred Waring and his Pennsylvanian Orchestra accompanied the film on stage, as did three vaudeville acts.

Upon opening, Metropolitan Theater sat more than 3,600, making it the largest movie theater in Los Angeles for many years. The theater also featured an orchestra lift, one of the largest balconies ever built, the longest projection throw in Los Angeles, and the theater was one of the first to be air conditioned in the United States. The building originally featured two entrances, a main entrance on 6th Street and a small entrance on Hill. These quickly proved inadequate, and so a third entrance was added on Broadway, connecting the theater to the Broadway Theater District.

In 1924, Grauman sold all his downtown holdings to Paramount Publix, who then employed Fox West Coast Theaters to operate this theater. In 1929, the theater was renamed Paramount Theatre, and was informally known as Paramount Downtown to distinguish it from the other Paramount Theatres in Los Angeles.

In 1950, Cabart Theaters Corp took over the theater, and two years later United Paramount Theatres took it over from them, after which they modernized the building with a new marquee and updated lobby.

The theater closed in 1960 and the building was demolished in 1962. It was replaced by a parking lot, which itself was replaced by sixteen story tower in the early 1980s. The tower currently houses the International Jewelry Center.

== Metropolitan Annex ==
- Metropolitan Annex
- U.S. Historic district – Contributing property
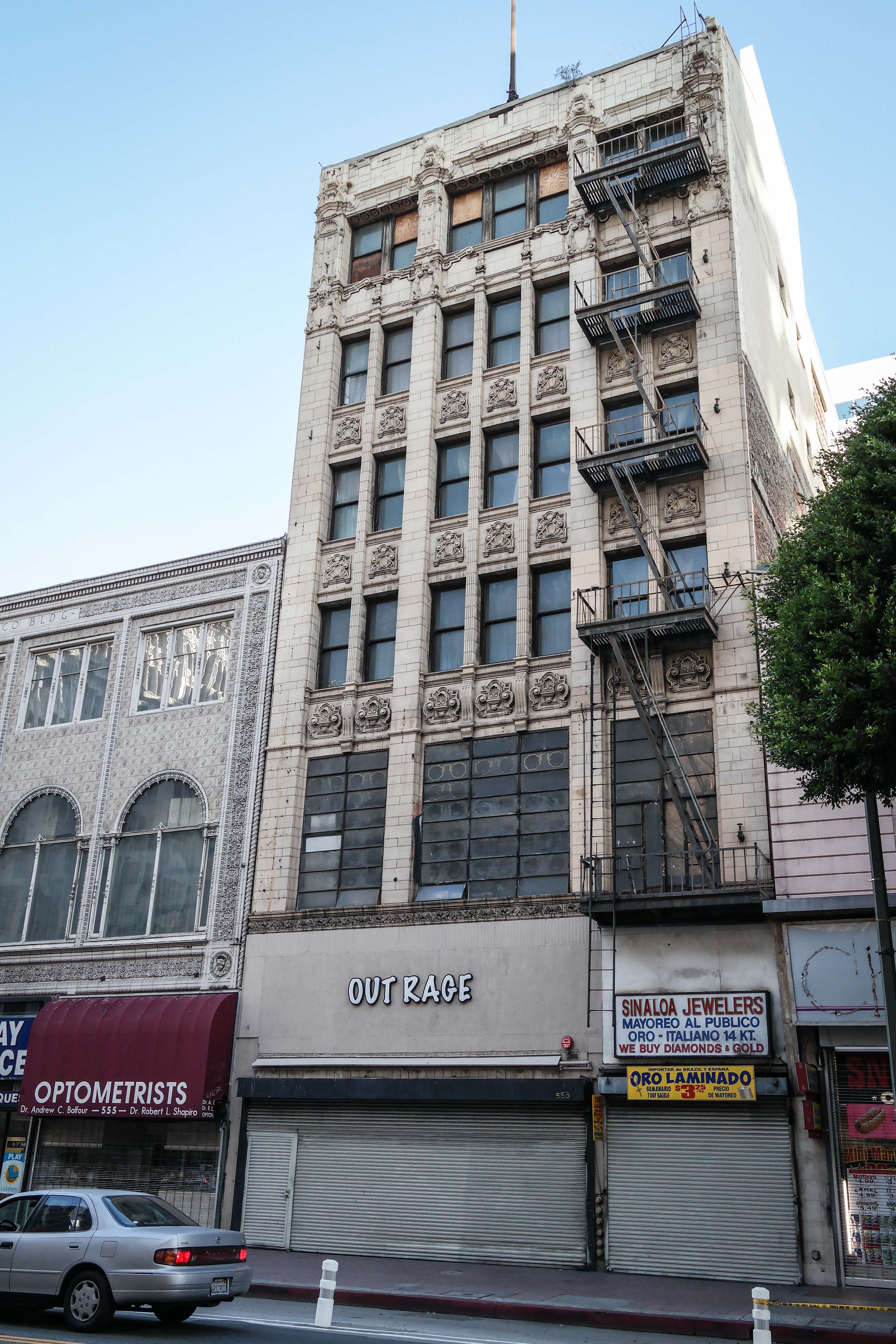
- The annex in 2014
- Location: 551-555 S. Broadway, Los Angeles, California
- Built: 1923
- Architect: Hal Pereira (remodel)
- Part of: Broadway Theater and Commercial District (ID79000484)
- Designated CP: May 9, 1979

Metropolitan Theatre originally featured two entrances but they quickly proved inadequate and so a third entrance was added on Broadway. This entrance, located in the Metropolitan Annex at 551-555 S. Broadway, connected the theater to the Broadway Theater District.

Metropolitan Annex was built of brick with terra cotta detailing in 1923 and was remodeled by Hal Pereira in 1941. It was not demolished with the rest of the building in 1962; instead, it was converted to a commercial/office building with ground floor retail. It was also listed as a contributing property in the Broadway Theater and Commercial District when the district was added to the National Register of Historic Places in 1979.

Metropolitan Annex is all that remains of Paramount Theatre today.

== See also ==
- List of contributing properties in the Broadway Theater and Commercial District
