= Malabar Branch Library =

- Malabar Branch
- U.S. National Register of Historic Places
- Los Angeles Historic-Cultural Monument
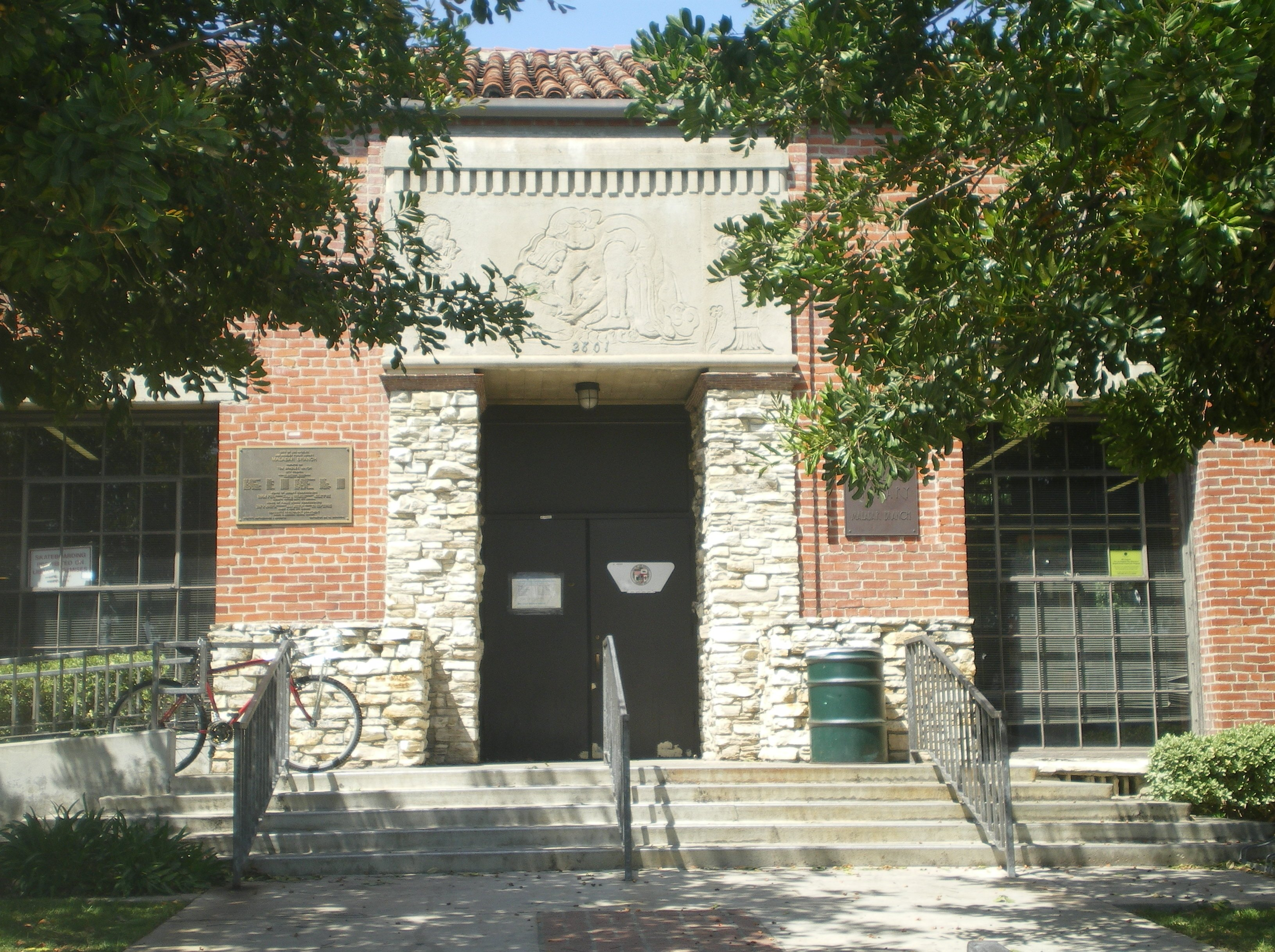
- Malabar Branch Library, 2008

- Location within the Los Angeles metropolitan area Location within California Location within the United States
- Location: 2801 Wabash Ave., Boyle Heights, Los Angeles, California
- Coordinates: 34°3′2.8″N 118°11′52.2″W
- Built: 1927
- Architect: William Lee Woollett
- Architectural style: Mediterranean Revival-Spanish Colonial Revival
- MPS: Los Angeles Branch Library System
- NRHP reference No.: 87001014
- LAHCM No.: 304
- Added to NRHP: May 19, 1987

Malabar Branch Library is a branch library of the Los Angeles Public Library located in the Boyle Heights section of Los Angeles, California.

Malabar Branch began in 1914 as a book depository in a Sunday school room at the Brooklyn Heights Methodist Church on the corner of Evergreen Avenue and Malabar Street. The original collection consisted of approximately 900 books that were checked out on the honor system.

In 1925, a bond issue was passed by Los Angeles voters providing funds for the construction of 14 new branch libraries, including the current Malabar Branch. Construction on the new Mediterranean Revival-Spanish Colonial Revival building started in 1926, and the new library was opened in May 1927. The building was designed by William Lee Woollett.

The Malabar Branch was damaged in the 1987 Whittier Narrows earthquake and was closed. The branch was extensively renovated and reopened in 1992 with separate reading rooms for adults and children, a multipurpose room and a patron services room.

In 1987, the Malabar Branch and several other branch libraries in Los Angeles were added to the National Register of Historic Places as part of a thematic group submission. The application noted that Malabar Branchis a one-story, brick structure designed in a revival style reminiscent of rural Latin America.

The Malabar Branch is a Los Angeles Historic-Cultural Monument.

== See also ==
- Los Angeles Historic-Cultural Monuments on the East and Northeast Sides
- List of Registered Historic Places in Los Angeles
- Los Angeles Public Library
