= Irene Mayer Selznick =

American theatre producer (1907–1990)

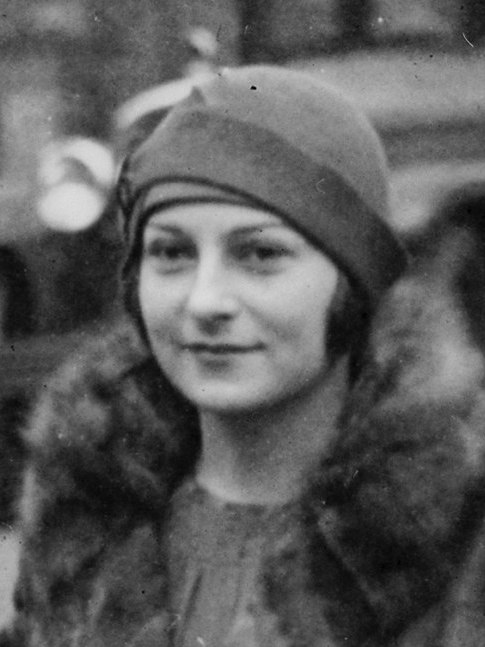
- Born: Irene Gladys Mayer; April 2, 1907; New York City, U.S.
- Died: October 10, 1990 (aged 83); New York City, U.S.
- Resting place: Hillside Memorial Park Cemetery
- Education: Hollywood School for Girls
- Occupation: Theatrical producer
- Years active: 1949–1961
- Spouse: David O. Selznick (m. 1930; div. 1949)
- Children: 2
- Parents: Louis B. Mayer (father); Margaret Shenberg Mayer (mother)

Irene Gladys Selznick (née Mayer; April 2, 1907 – October 10, 1990) was an American socialite and theatrical producer.

== Early life ==
Irene Gladys Mayer was born in Brooklyn, the younger of two daughters born to film producer Louis B. Mayer and his first wife, Margaret Shenberg Mayer.

Her sister, Edith (1905–1987), was nicknamed "Edie." In March, 1930, Edith married William Goetz, who became the vice president of 20th Century Fox in 1941 and later became the head of production at Universal-International.

Selznick's paternal and maternal grandparents were Belarusian Jews who immigrated to Canada in the 1880s from Vilnius and Kaunas (then territories belonging to the Russian Empire).

The Mayer family initially lived in Haverhill, Massachusetts, and then moved to Hollywood in 1918. It was there that her father established Metro-Goldwyn-Mayer, one of the more successful film studios of its time. She attended Hollywood School for Girls, a private school in Los Angeles. She and her sister Edith both studied singing with Estelle Liebling, the voice teacher of Beverly Sills.

== Marriage and career ==
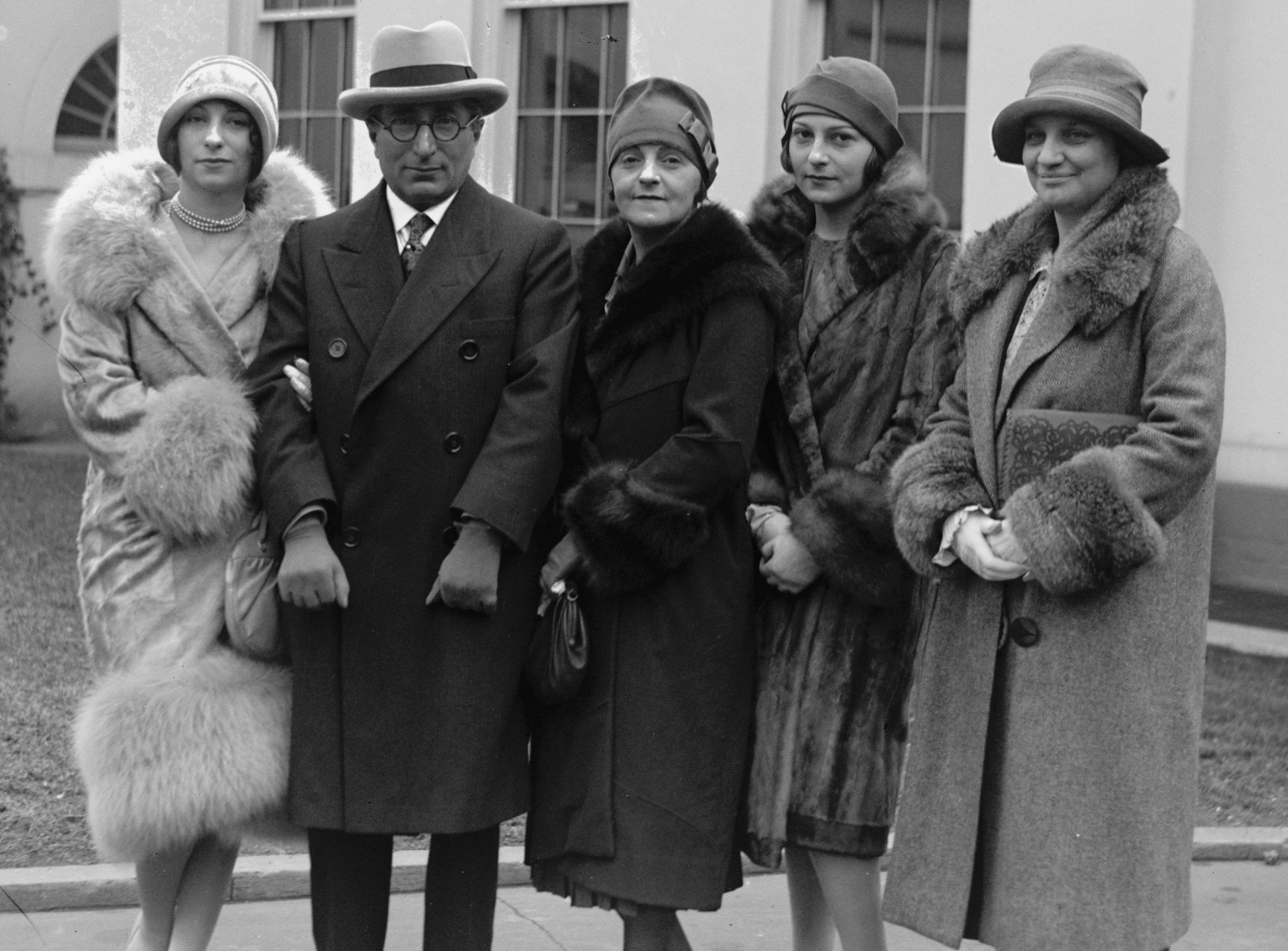
Irene Mayer Selznick (second from right) with U.S. Assistant Attorney General Mabel Walker Willebrandt (right), her mother Margaret Shenberg Mayer (center), father Louis B. Mayer (second from left), and older sister Edith Mayer (left) at the White House on February 3, 1927

Irene married producer David O. Selznick in 1930. Her husband came from an extremely dysfunctional but talented family, and he was one of the few men who stimulated her intellect. During the marriage, she acted as a hostess to the couple's Hollywood parties. The couple frequently socialized with Hollywood stars, including Ingrid Bergman, Janet Gaynor, and Katharine Hepburn. Selznick was also an executive at her husband's production company. Irene Selznick also did volunteer and charity work and worked as a probation officer for juveniles for Los Angeles County during World War II.

After separating from her husband in 1945, Irene Selznick moved to New York City, where she pursued her love of the theatre. In 1947, she worked with playwright Tennessee Williams and director Elia Kazan and produced her first play, A Streetcar Named Desire, which gave Marlon Brando his break-out role. The play's success brought her a great deal of respect, and she produced four more plays, among them 1955's The Chalk Garden for which she received a Tony Award nomination. She retired in 1961.

Considered by her peers within the entertainment industry as one of the foremost historians of Hollywood and Broadway, Selznick published her autobiography, A Private View, in 1983.

== Personal life ==
Mayer and Selznick had two sons, Lewis Jeffrey (1932–1997) and Daniel Selznick (1936-2024), both of whom became film producers. Daniel married Susan Warms Dryfoos, daughter of Orvil E. Dryfoos.

However, David O. Selznick's constant philandering and frequent financial problems as a result of a gambling addiction drove them apart, which resulted in her leaving Selznick in 1945. Their divorce became final on January 22, 1949.

She was a close friend of Katharine Hepburn for several decades, but distanced herself from her late in life.

== Death ==
Irene Mayer Selznick died on October 10, 1990, from complications from breast cancer at her apartment at The Pierre in Manhattan. Her remains were returned to California, where she was interred next to her mother in the Mausoleum, Hall of Graciousness, Hillside Memorial Park Cemetery in Culver City, California.

== Broadway productions ==
- A Streetcar Named Desire (1947)
- Bell, Book and Candle (1950)
- Flight Into Egypt (1952)
- The Chalk Garden (1955)
- The Complaisant Lover (1961)
