= Louise Knappen Woollett =

American educator

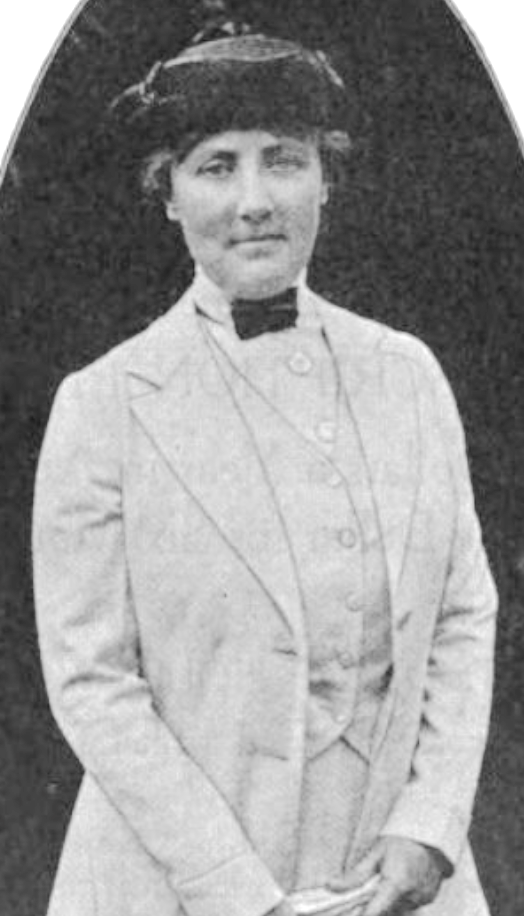
- Louise Knappen Woollett, from a 1918 publication
- Born: Louise Sarah Knappen; May 15, 1875; Minneapolis, Minnesota
- Died: August 4, 1955 (age 80)
- Occupations: Educator, school principal, clubwoman
- Spouse: William Lee Woollett

Louise Sarah Knappen Woollett (May 15, 1875 – August 4, 1955) was an American educator, school administrator, clubwoman, and arts patron. She was principal of the Hollywood School for Girls in Los Angeles from 1915 until 1932.

== Early life and education ==
Knappen was born in Minneapolis, Minnesota, the daughter of Theodore Frelinghuysen Knappen and Sarah Letitia McFarlane Knappen. Her grandfather Hugh McFarlane served in the Wisconsin legislature. Her younger sister, Elizabeth Knappen Ames, was the longtime director of the Yaddo arts retreat. Louise graduated from the University of Minnesota, and trained as a teacher at Winona State Normal School.

== Career ==
Knappen taught at schools in Minnesota and the Pacific Northwest as a young woman. She was principal of the Hollywood School of Girls beginning in 1915. During her tenure, the school's students including the children of Hollywood's most prominent figures, including Cecil B. DeMille (who was also a member of the school's advisory board), Louis B. Mayer, and Jesse L. Lasky, and future film stars such as Jean Harlow. Designer Edith Head taught French, Spanish, and art classes at the school. Classes were conducted outdoors, and boys were admitted to the lower grades.

Her sister Marjorie Knappen was Knappen's assistant principal at the Hollywood School, briefly, before she married in early 1917. Later in 1917, Louise Knappen also married, to architect William Lee Woollett. She remained as principal of the Hollywood School after marriage, until it closed in 1932. She oversaw expansion of the school's campus in 1923, and took a sabbatical in 1931 to study other girls' schools.

Woollett was a founding member of the Hollywood Chamber of Commerce, and served on the boards of the Assistance League of Southern California and the Los Angeles Women's Athletic Club.

== Personal life ==
Knappen married widowed architect William Lee Woollett in 1917; his daughter Prudence attended the Hollywood School. Her husband died in February 1955, and she died in August 1955, at the age of 80.
