= Arthur E. Harvey =

American architect

- Born: 1884; Boston, Massachusetts, U.S.
- Died: 1971 (aged 86–87); Los Angeles County, California, U.S.
- Occupation: Architect
- Spouse: Nellie W. Glines
- Children: 1 son

Arthur E. Harvey (1884–1971) was an American architect. He designed many buildings in Los Angeles, California, including at least three on Wilshire Boulevard.

== Early life ==
Harvey was born in 1884 in Boston, Massachusetts. He was a first-generation American, as both his parents were immigrants from England.

== Career ==
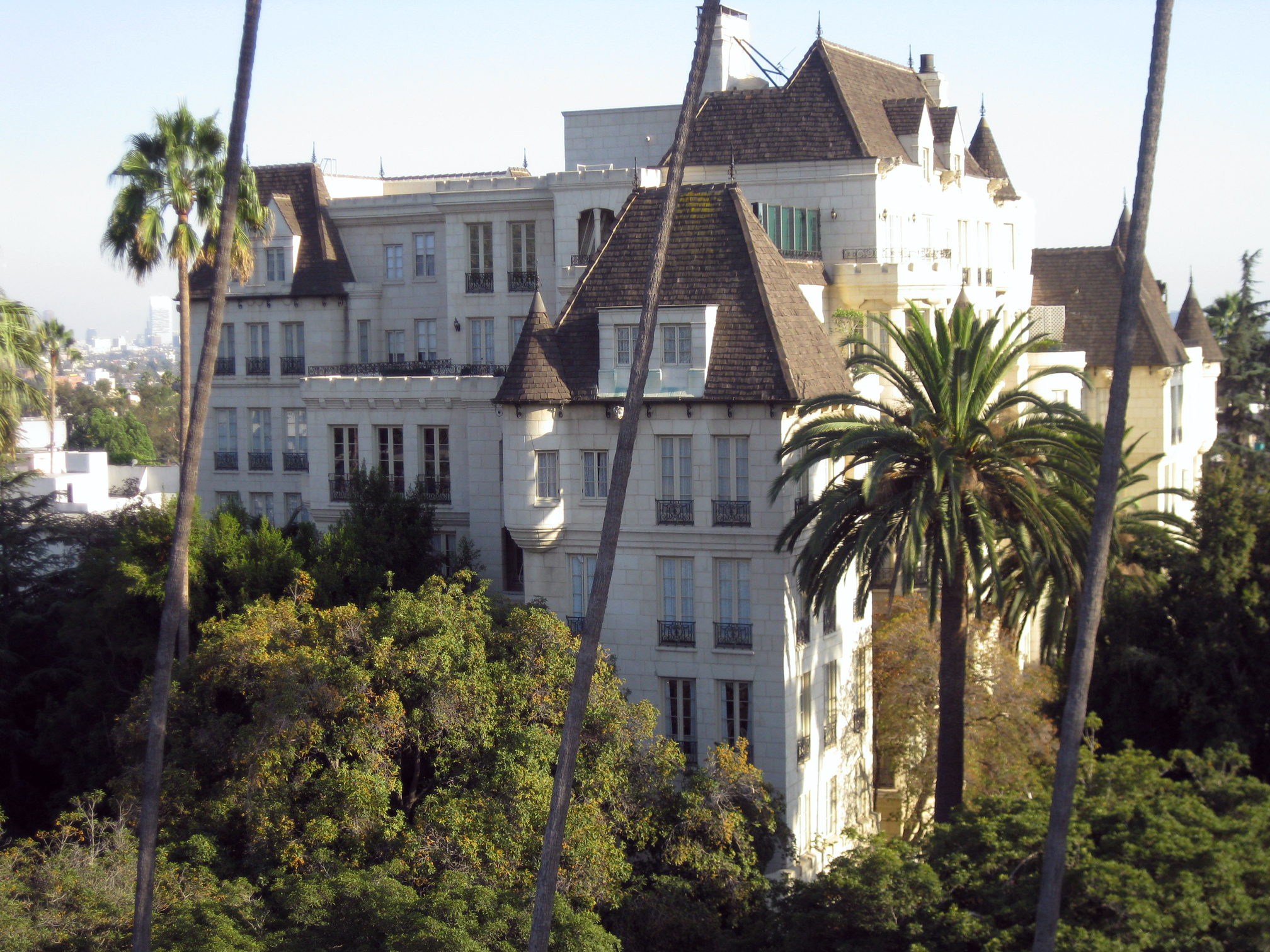
The Château Élysée, designed by Harvey.

Harvey began his career as a carpenter in Pasadena in 1908. He worked as a structural engineer in Seattle in 198 and as a draftsman in Detroit in 1920, and he returned to Los Angeles in 1921 to work for developer Frank L. Moline.

Harvey designed several buildings in Los Angeles in the 1920s-1940s, including residential apartment blocks. He designed Château Élysée at 5930 Franklin Avenue in Hollywood in 1928.

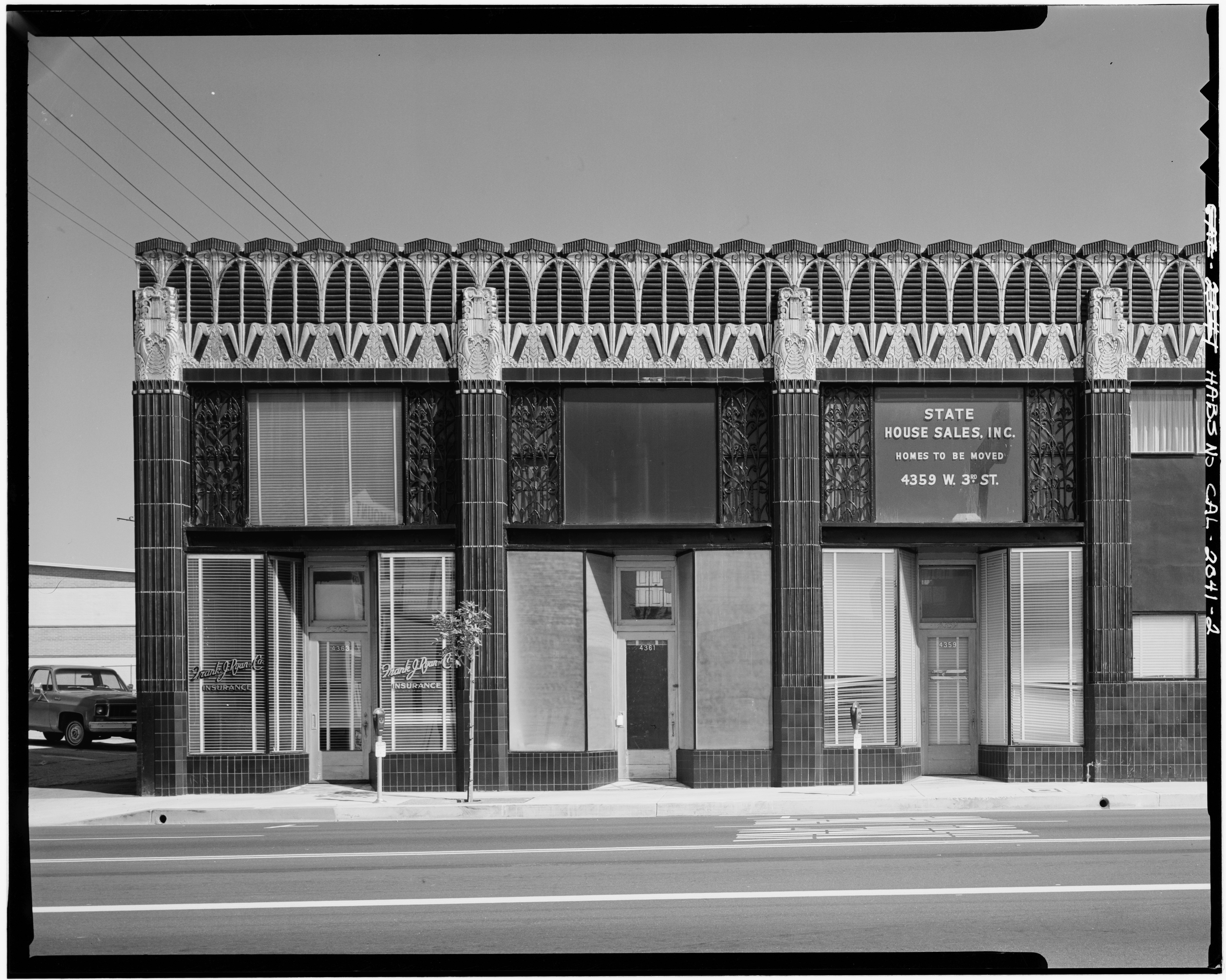
The Selig Building, designed by Harvey.

Harvey designed the Santa Monica Professional Building in the Spanish Colonial architectural style, located at 710 Wilshire Boulevard in Santa Monica, in 1924. In 1929, he designed the Wilshire Professional Building in the Art Deco architectural style, located at Wilshire and St. Andrews. The same year, he designed the American Storage and Company Building at 3636 Beverly Boulevard in the Art Deco style.

Harvey designed the Selig building at 3rd Street and Western Avenue in the Art Deco style, completed in 1931. He designed the Hollywood Women's Club, located at 1749 North La Brea Avenue, in 1947. He designed an extension of the Beverly Community Hospital in Montebello in 1952.

== Personal life and death ==
With his wife, nee Nellie W. Glines, Harvey had a son.

Harvey died in 1971.
