= Tom Gilmore (property developer) =

American property developer

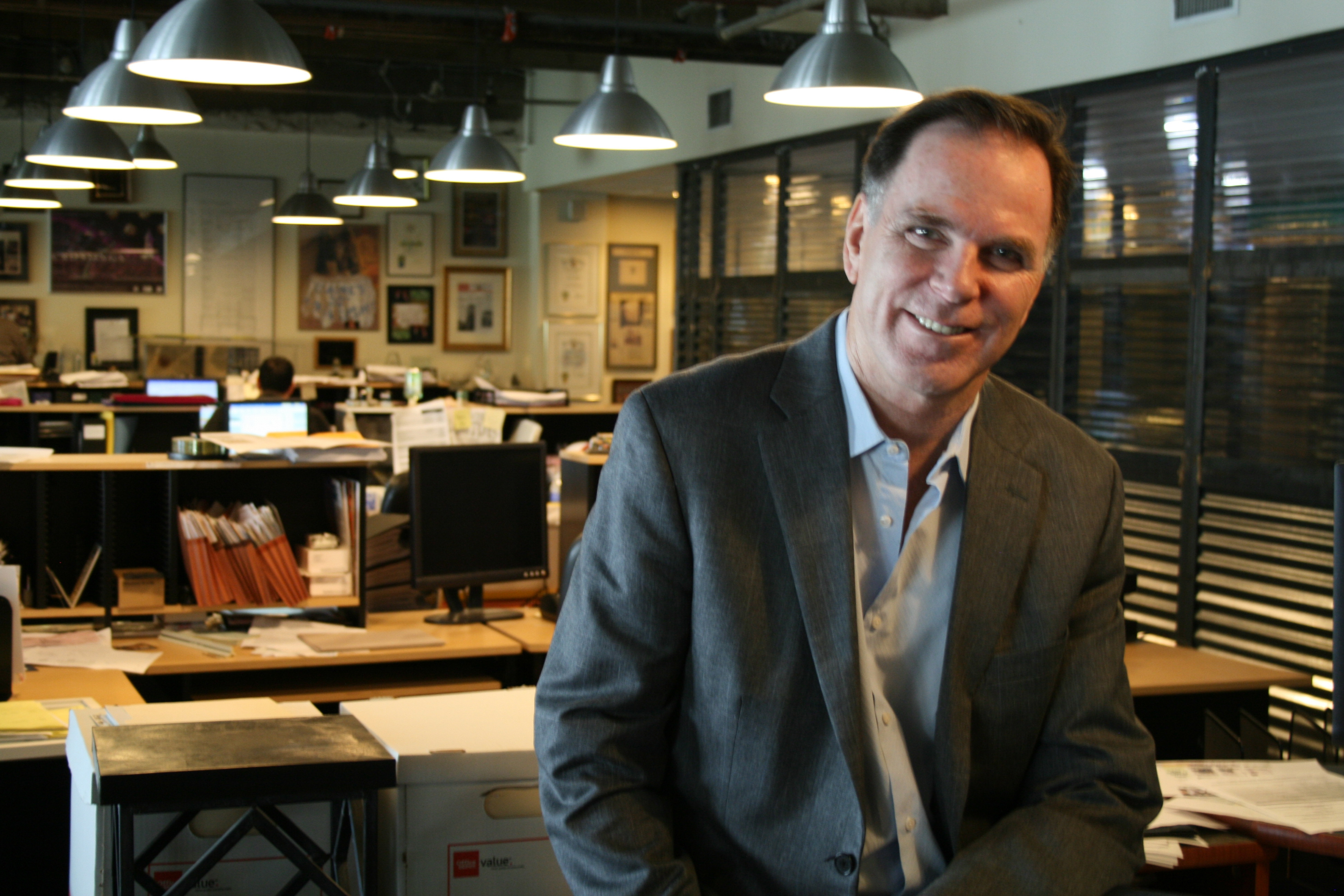
- Born: 1953 (age 72–73)
- Known for: American property developer
- Website: www.gilmoredev.com/tom-gilmore/

Tom Gilmore is a downtown Los Angeles–based developer of residential and commercial properties.

Gilmore began his career by building a small architectural firm in New York and eventually relocated to Los Angeles, leading to his partnership with Jerri Perrone. In 1998, Gilmore and Perrone formed an independent development firm, Gilmore Associates, to embark upon the redevelopment of the Historic Core of Downtown Los Angeles.

== Developments ==
Gilmore purchased four abandoned historic buildings: the Continental, the Hellman, the San Fernando, and the Farmers and Merchants National Bank—all of which are located in Downtown Los Angeles and collectively renamed by Gilmore and Perrone as the “Old Bank District.” Gilmore was the first developer to utilize the newly minted Adaptive Reuse Ordinance of 1999, which enabled him to convert historic commercial buildings into mixed- use residences, ultimately catalyzing the widespread redevelopment and revival of Downtown.

== Community affiliations ==
Gilmore serves on several city and non-profit boards. He is currently Chair of Central City Association (CCA); Mayoral-Appointee Chairman of Sister Cities of Los Angeles (SCOLA); MEXLA Commission member; Executive Committee Board Member of Los Angeles Tourism and Convention Bureau; ArtCenter Board Trustee, and Member of the Board of Governors at the Natural History Museum of Los Angeles County. Gilmore previously served as Chairman of the Board of Trustees for the Southern California Institute of Architecture (SCI-Arc), Board Member Los Angeles Parks Foundation City Commissioner for the Los Angeles Homeless Services Authority and was Chairman in his final year of service.

== Awards ==
- LA Conservancy – 2019 Chair’s Award for Redbird | Vibiana
- Central City Association – Treasure of Los Angeles Award 2010
- Los Angeles Downtown News – Project of the Decade Award 2009
- Woodbury University – Citizen of the Year Award 2008
- Los Angeles Business Journal – Adaptive Reuse Developer Award 2007
- Young Presidents' Organization of Los Angeles – L.A.'s Downtown Renaissance Award 2007
- Beverly Hills Greater Los Angeles Association of Realtors – Donald J. Trump Award 2006
- Los Angeles Business Journal – Real Estate Pioneer Award 2006
- Los Angeles Downtown News – Downtowner of Distinction Award 2006
- Jason71 Design Studio – Crime Fighter Award 2003
- American Institute of Architects – City Rebuilder Award 2002
- Hollywood Arts Council – Preservation Arts Award 2002
- Pacific Design Center – Stars of Design Award 2002
- Los Angeles Conservancy – Preservationist Award 2002
- Los Angeles Conservancy – Preservationist Award 2001
- California Preservation Foundation – Preservationist of the Year Award 2001
- Midnight Mission – Visions Award 2001
- St. Vincent Medical Center – Cornette Award 2001
