= Continental Building =

Historic building in Los Angeles, California

- U.S. Historic district – Contributing property
- Los Angeles Historic-Cultural Monument
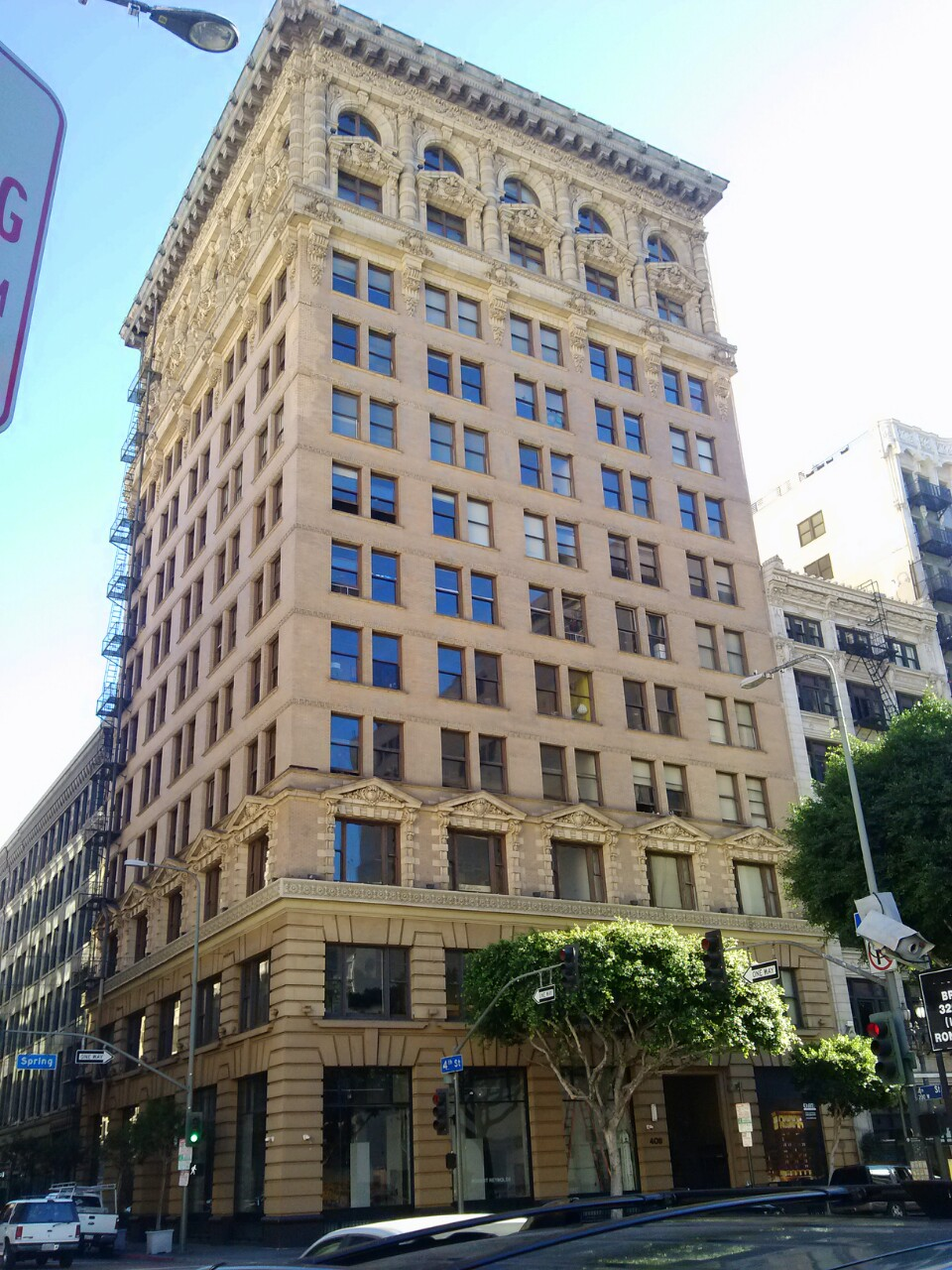
- The building in 2014

- Location within the Los Angeles metropolitan area
- Location: 408 S. Spring Street, Los Angeles, California, United States
- Coordinates: 34.0486°N 118.2482°W
- Built: between 1902 and 1904
- Architect: John B. Parkinson
- Architectural style: Beaux Arts
- Part of: Spring Street Financial District (ID79000489)
- LAHCM No.: 730

Significant dates
- Designated CP: August 10, 1979
- Designated LAHCM: October 18, 2002

Continental Building, formerly Braly Block, Braly Building, Union Trust Building, Hibernian Building, and California Reserve Building, also known as Old Bank District Apartments, is a historic building located at 408 S. Spring Street, on the corner of 4th and Spring, in downtown Los Angeles, California. Considered Los Angeles's first skyscraper, it is a Los Angeles Historic Cultural Monument and a contributing property in the Spring Street Financial District.

== History ==
Continental Building, Los Angeles's first skyscraper, was designed by John B. Parkinson and built between 1902 and 1904. The building is 175 feet (53 m) in height, making it Los Angeles's tallest until 1928 and its second tallest until the 1950s due to a citywide 150-foot (46 m) height limit enacted in 1905, the one exception to the limit being Los Angeles City Hall. The building was originally named Braly Block, after John Hyde Braly, the president of the business that constructed the building, and upon completion, it was considered one of the most technologically advanced buildings in the city.

The building was sold by Union Security Company of Los Angeles to H. C. Edwards and his associates for $750,000 in 1919 ($13.9 million in 2025), after which Edwards's employer Continental Life Insurance Company of Utah moved into the building. Other building tenants over the years include Pacific Mutual Insurance Company, architectural firms Allison and Allison and Hunt and Grey, and numerous banks.

In 1979, the Spring Street Financial District was added to the National Register of Historic Places, with Continental Building listed as a contributing property in the district. The building was designated Los Angeles Historic Cultural Monument No. 730 on October 18, 2002.

In 2001, Gilmore Associates converted Continental Building into a 56-unit residential building. Nicolas Cage once lived in the building's penthouse. Gilmore Associates sold the building to Rebel Hospitality for $28.6 million in 2018 ($36.7 million in 2025), and Rebel Hospitality released plans to convert the building to a 140-room hotel the following year. The proposal included demolishing and rebuilding the penthouse level; the plans would also increase the building's height to 202 feet (62 m).

== Architecture and design ==
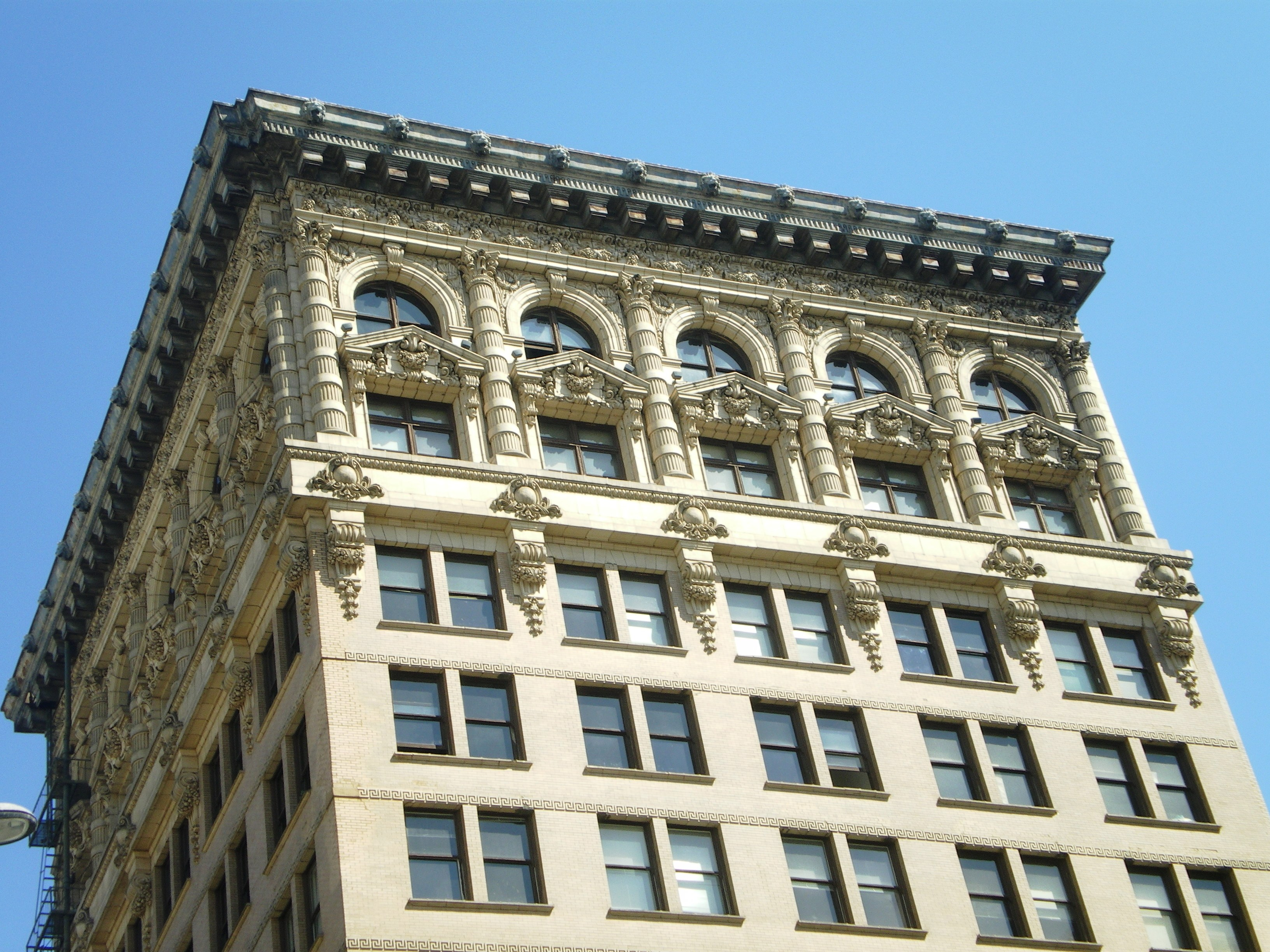
The building's upper floors

Continental Building is 175 feet (53 m) in height and built of brick, terra cotta, and reinforced concrete with a steel frame. The building is tall and thin and features a Beaux Arts design. The three-story base, seven-story shaft, and two-story capital are clearly articulated, with the shaft significantly stretched.

Each of the building's fronts is divided into five bays with wood-framed tripartite windows in each bay. The second story features cast concrete blocks designed to resemble stone, and a frieze separates the second and third stories. Third story windows are framed by exaggerated quoins and crowned by pediments. The shaft is unadorned excepting stringcourses that divide each floor, with the stringcourse at the lintel level featuring a Greek key pattern. Brackets and bosses top the tenth floor. On the capital, arched openings terminate the shaft below cornice; the capital also contains massive rounded columns that form a Corinthian order colonnade.

None of the buildings original interior remains.

== In popular culture ==
Continental Building was mentioned and featured in the 2009 film (500) Days of Summer.

== See also ==
- List of contributing properties in the Spring Street Financial District
