= William Lee Woollett =

American architect

- Born: November 13, 1873; Albany, New York, US
- Died: February 11, 1955 (aged 81)
- Occupation: Architect
- Spouse(s): Louise May Briggs; Louse Sarah Knappen (m. 1917)
- Practice: Woollett and Woollett Architects

William Lee Woollett (November 13, 1873 – February 11, 1955) was an American architect practicing mainly in California. He designed theaters in Los Angeles in the 1920s including the largest movie theater ever built in Los Angeles, Grauman's Metropolitan Theatre which opened in 1923.

== Life and career ==
=== Early life ===
William Lee Woollett was born in Albany, New York, the son of William M. Woollett. His father died when he was seven years old.

=== Education ===
Around 1892, Woollett studied architecture at the Massachusetts Institute of Technology. He apprenticed as a draftsman for Fehmer & Page, Architects, Boston, MA (1892-1896).

=== Early career ===
Woollett returned to Albany in 1896 to open his office. He was joined a few years later by his younger brother, John Woodward Woollett, also an architect. Together, they founded the firm, Woollett and Woollett Architects becoming the 3rd consecutive generation of Woolletts to practice architecture in Albany. After the San Francisco earthquake of 1906, Woollett and Woollett opened a branch office in San Francisco. William Woollett moved his family to Berkeley in 1908 and closed the Albany office. Woollett and Woollett was located in San Francisco until 1917 when William Lee Woollett relocated to Los Angeles. In 1921, the firm relocated permanently to Los Angeles.

=== Later life and death ===
Woollett died on February 11, 1955.

== Significant buildings ==
Woollett was responsible for a number of significant structures in California, including:

=== Los Angeles ===
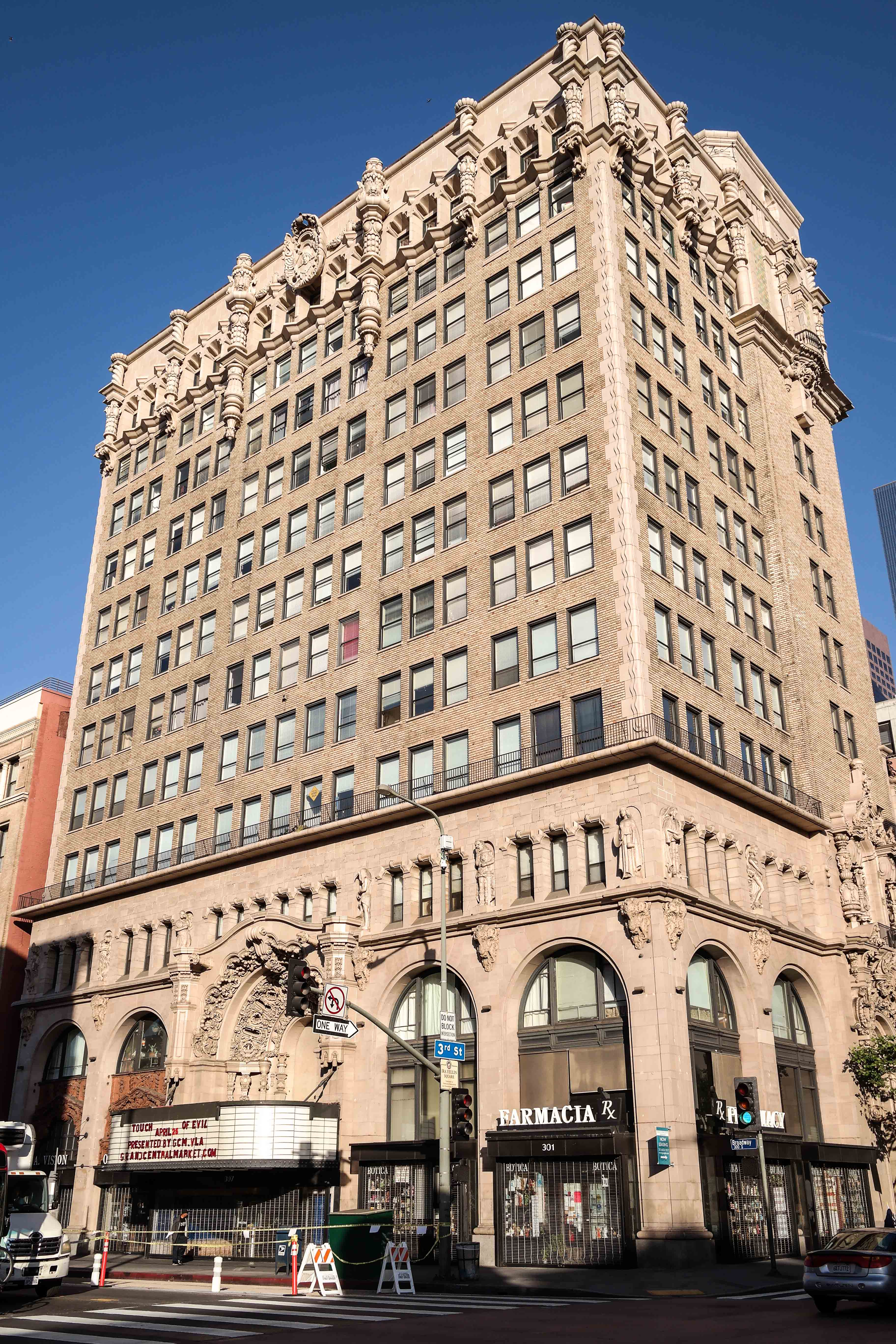
Million Dollar Theater

- Tajo Building (1896-97)
- Million Dollar Theater, (1917-18), NRHP-listed
- Lee B. Memefee House (1920)
- Grauman’s Metropolitan Theater interior (1921-23)
- Rialto Theater (1923 remodel), NRHP-listed
- Lakeside Country Club (1924-25)
- Malabar Branch Library (1927), NRHP-listed

=== Greater Los Angeles ===
- Otis Hoyt House, Long Beach (1920)
- McClain House, Beverly Hills (1920)
- George Lockwood Eastman House, West Hollywood (1926)
- E.J. Longyear House, Alta Dena (1927)
- William Woollett House, Glendale

=== Bay Area ===
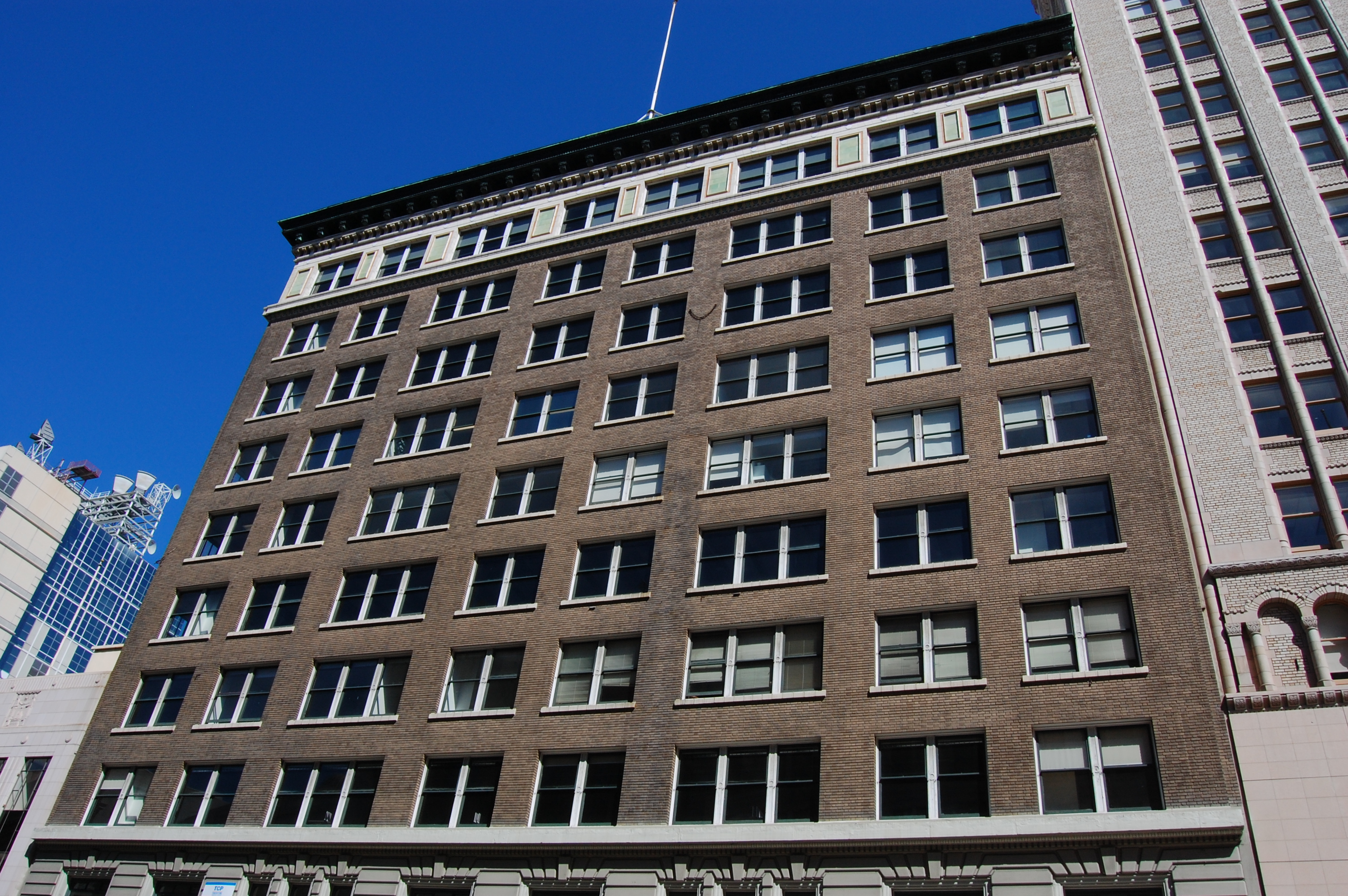
Syndicate Building

- Municipal Rose Garden, Oakland
- Syndicate Building, Oakland (1910-11)
- The Berkeley Piano Club, Berkeley (1912)
- Hotel Royal, Oakland (1912/13)
- Linda Vista Park, Oakland (1933-37)

=== Elsewhere in California ===
- John J. Iten House, Lake Arrowhead (1930)
- Borrego Valley Defense Program Airfield, Salton Sea (1942)

== Publications ==
- Naylor, David, American Picture Palaces The Architecture of Fantasy, 83, 85, 217, 1981.
- "Grauman's Metropolitan Theater", Architect and Engineer, 73: 2, 51-85, 1923-05.
- "West Hollywood residence", Architect & Engineer, 75, 5/1927.
- "Metropolitan Theatre", Concrete in Architecture, 28-39, 1927.
- "Boyle Heights libraries renovations underway", Eastside Sun, 02/21/1991.
- Gebhard, David, Winter, Robert, Los Angeles An Architectural Guide, 234, 1994.
- "Eastman most valuable Los Angeles citizen in'28", Los Angeles Examiner, 1/13/1929.
- "Interior Design for New Hill Street Motion Picture Playhouse", Los Angeles Times, 1, 1921-05-22.
- Jones, Roger E., "Decoratively, artistically, architecturally - it presents something unique and beautiful: the Million Dollar Theatre, Los Angeles, California", Marquee, 34: 2, 6-13, 32, 2002.
- "George Lockwood Eastman article", Southern California Business, 24, 10/1928.
- "Woollett, William Lee Notice", Southwest Builder and Contractor, 11, col. 3, 1920-08-06.
- "McClain House plans, Beverly Hills", Southwest Builder and Contractor, 12, col 3, 08/20/1920.
- "Iten, John J., House plans, Lake Arrowhead", Southwest Builder and Contractor, 58, col 2, 06/20/1930.
- "Eastman House preliminary plans", Southwest Builder & Contractor, 43, col 1, 11/2/1923.
- "Eastman, George L., House plans", Southwest Builder & Contractor, 45, 1/4/1924.
- Ingels, Margaret, Willis Haviland Carrier Father of Air Conditioning, 144-145, 1952.

== Legacy ==
William Lee Woollett's papers were given to the Architecture and Design Collection of the Art, Design and Architecture Museum, University of California, Santa Barbara (UCSB), in 1981 by his son, William Lee Woollett, FAIA.
