= Villa Carlotta (Hollywood) =

Apartment building in Los Angeles, California

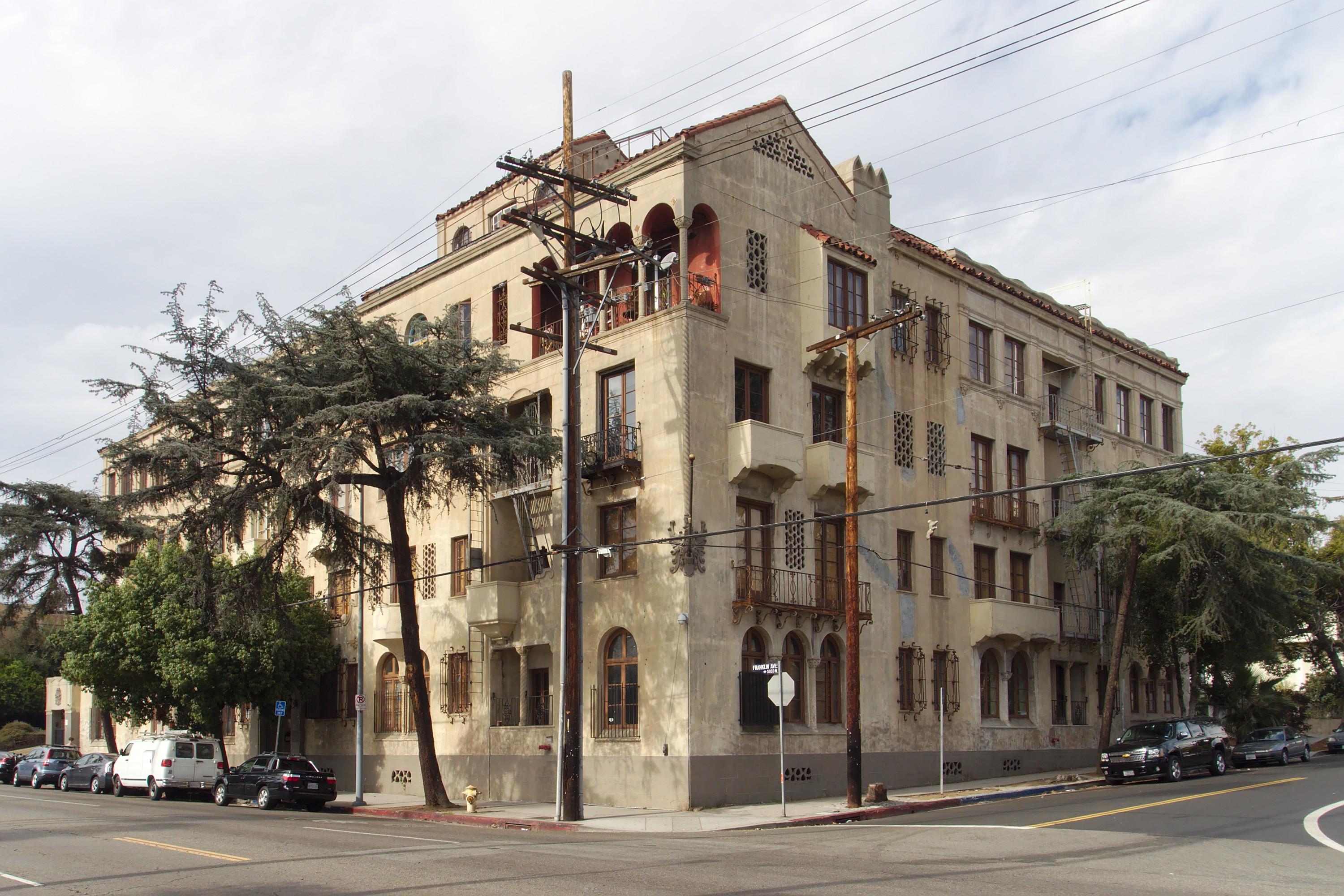
- View from the southeast, 2015

General information
- Architectural style: Spanish Colonial Revival
- Location: 5959 Franklin Avenue; Hollywood, Los Angeles, California
- Coordinates: 34.1054725°N 118.3195648°W
- Year built: 1926

Design and construction
- Architect: Arthur E. Harvey
- Developer: Elinor Kershaw
- Main contractor: Luther T. Mayo

Renovating team
- Renovating firm: CGI Strategies
- Awards: California Preservation Design Award

Los Angeles Historic-Cultural Monument
- Designated: October 28, 1986
- Reference no.: 315

Villa Carlotta is a Spanish Colonial-style apartment building at 5959 Franklin Avenue in Hollywood, Los Angeles. It was built in 1926 for actress Elinor Kershaw, and was designated a Los Angeles Historic-Cultural Monument in 1986. The building was renovated in the late 2010s into a luxury apartment hotel catering to long-term guests.

== History ==
The Villa Carlotta was built in 1926 for actress and property developer Elinor Kershaw. Kershaw, the widow of film producer Thomas H. Ince, later developed the Château Élysée on an adjacent lot.

The building was rumored to have been financed by publisher William Randolph Hearst. Ince died in 1924 shortly after a trip on Hearst's yacht, and rumors persisted that he was murdered by Hearst. In August 1930, a fire in the building caused damage to reportedly originating above the apartment of actor Francis McDonald, caused $100,000 of damage, equivalent to $1,490,000 in 2024.

In 2011, one of the studio apartments in the building rented for $925 per month. A profile of one of its tenants highlighted significant quantities of flaking lead paint in their apartment, and described the building as "notable for its arts-inflected tenant body." The building was owned by the Lesser family from the 1950s until 2014, when it was sold to real estate firm CGI Strategies for $12.25 million.

The building's notable tenants include actor Edward G. Robinson, actress Marion Davies, writer William Saroyan, film producer David O. Selznick, and architect Wallace Neff. Louella Parsons wrote her gossip column from her two-story apartment in the building.

CGI Strategies announced a plan to convert the building into a luxury hotel in 2014, and served eviction notices to the building's tenants in December 2014. The Ellis Act permits owners of rent-controlled apartment buildings to evict tenants if the building is being demolished or if the landlord is exiting the apartment rental business. CGI Strategies offered more than the legally required compensation for tenants to relocate, on the condition that they waive certain rights to return to the building.

The plans to convert the building to a hotel were abandoned in 2016 after substantial opposition. Los Angeles City Council member David Ryu was elected to office in 2015 with a platform that included opposing the redevelopment. The building was instead renovated into an apartment hotel, offering stays of at least 30 days. As required by the Ellis Act, some tenants could return to the building at their previous rent rates, although by 2018 only one tenant had returned.

The 2010s renovations to the building involved the restoration of historic finishes and the installation of new plumbing and HVAC systems. CGI Strategies received a Preservation Design Award from the California Preservation Foundation for the renovation, which cost over $5 million and took approximately two years to complete.

In the early 2020s, fraudster David P. Bloom lived at the Villa Carlotta and defrauded multiple residents of the building. Bloom had previously been convicted of fraud in New York on two separate occasions, gaining the nickname "Wall Street Whiz Kid" for his actions in the 1980s. Bloom was convicted on 18 counts of grand theft and securities fraud in May 2026, including for defrauding multiple Villa Carlotta residents.

== Architecture ==
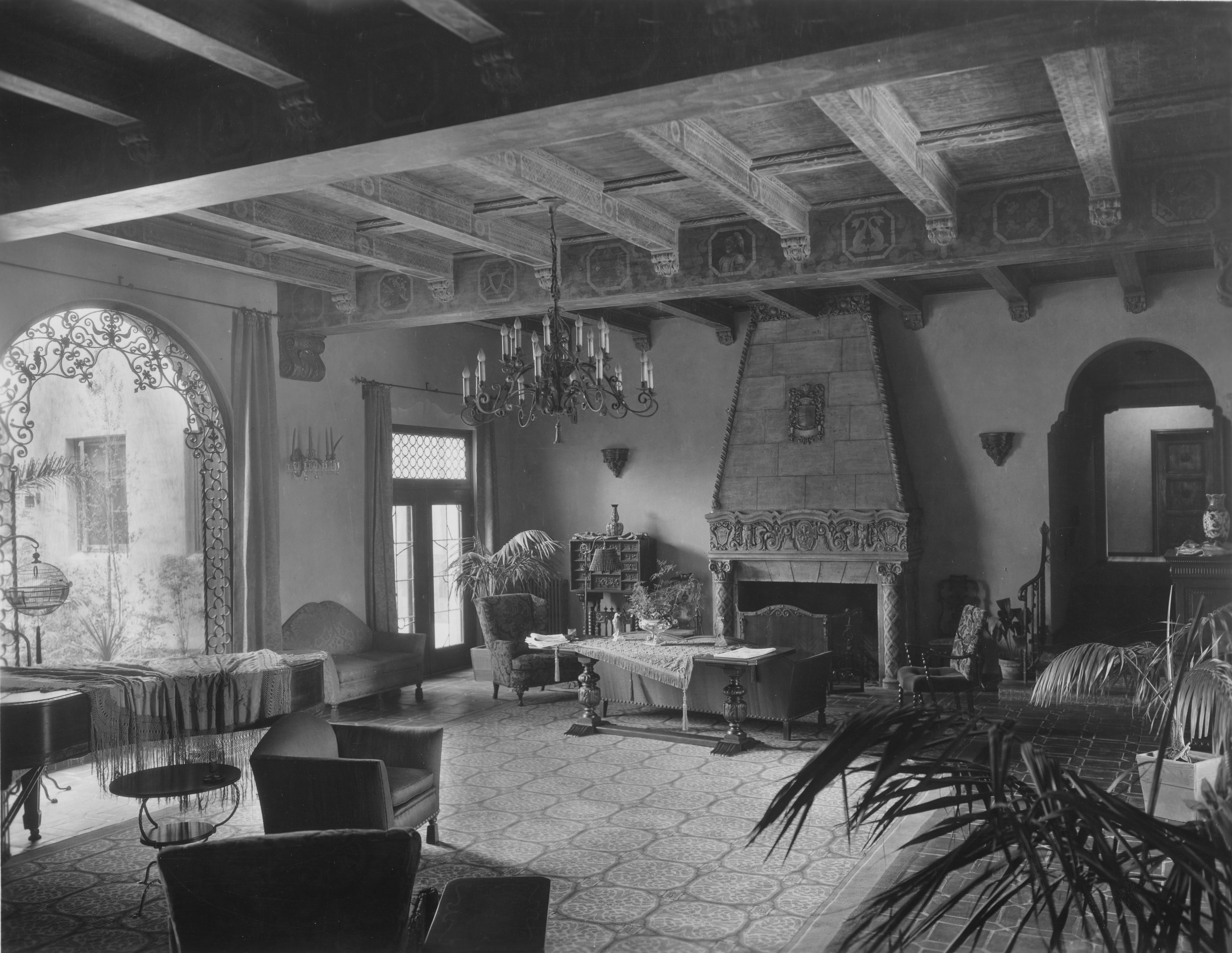
Interior, ca. 1928

The four-story building was designed by Arthur E. Harvey, whose other commissions include the adjacent Château Élysée. It is in the Spanish Colonial Revival style. The building features a façade that is visually separated into multiple window and roof patterns, creating the appearance of multiple structures. The building is constructed of masonry, with a stucco finish.
