= The Vortex =

1924 play by Noël Coward

Noël Coward and Lilian Braithwaite in Act III

The Vortex is a play in three acts by the English writer and actor Noël Coward. The play depicts the sexual vanity of a rich, ageing beauty, her troubled relationship with her adult son, and drug abuse in British society circles after the First World War. The son's cocaine habit is seen by many critics as a metaphor for homosexuality, then taboo in Britain. Despite, or because of, its scandalous content for the time, the play was Coward's first great commercial success.

The play premiered in November 1924 in London and played in three theatres until June 1925, followed by a British tour and a New York production in 1925–26. It has enjoyed several revivals and a film adaptation.

== Background ==
The Lancasters: left to right, Florence, Nicky and David

In the years after the First World War, pairings in England of older, upper-class women and younger men were common. The idea for the play was put in Coward's mind by an incident at a nightclub. Grace Forster, the elegant mother of his friend Stewart Forster, was talking to a young admirer, when a young woman said, in earshot of Coward and Forster, "Will you look at that old hag over there with the young man in tow; she's old enough to be his mother". Forster paid no attention, and Coward immediately went across and embraced Grace, as a silent rebuke to the young woman who had made the remark. The episode led him to consider how a "mother–young son–young lover triangle" might be the basis of a play.

To add to the dramatic effect of his play, Coward included a further source of conflict between the mother, Florence, and son, Nicky. Coward's friend and biographer Cole Lesley records, "this came easily to him from his unlikely pre-occupation … with the subject of drug addiction". To Nicky's explicit cocaine habit, the author added what many critics have seen as a gay sub-text. Coward's biographer Philip Hoare sees clues to Nicky's unconventional sexuality in his intimate friendship with John Bagot (an offstage character), and his implausible engagement to a brisk young woman, Bunty Mainwaring; Hoare describes her as "a 'beard', a guise of heterosexuality". When asked if she is pretty, Nicky answers, "I don't know – I haven't really noticed." Florence's lover Tom finds Nicky "effeminate". The literary critic John Lahr writes that Coward pushed at the prevailing moral boundaries of the day: "His straight-talking about homosexuality – the issue disguised as drug-taking in The Vortex and the code behind the frivolity in his great comedies – was as far as he could go." (Note: A 2002 London production in which this aspect of the play was played down received critical disapproval. The reviewer Paul Taylor wrote: "[W]hat stops the production from taking full flight is the decision to edit out all the hints that the drama is a coded play about homosexuality. References to Nicky's effeminacy and to his strange disregard for Bunty's attractiveness have been quietly removed. You sense, from the original, that Coward, in an ideal world, would have written a piece in which Florence's son and her young lover fall into each other's arms.")

Kate Cutler, seen here in Coward's 1923 play The Young Idea, dropped out of the leading role at the last moment but later played the role on tour.

Until 1968 the English theatre was subject to official censorship; plays had to be licensed by the Lord Chamberlain's Office. The Vortex barely survived the censor's scrutiny, but Coward pleaded his case in person to the Lord Chamberlain, Lord Cromer. He persuaded Cromer that the play was "a moral tract", and despite reservations expressed to the Chamberlain by King George V and others, Cromer granted a licence.

Leading London managements considered staging the piece, but some shied away from the scandalous content, and others did not want Coward to play the lead. As one of Coward's principal objects in writing the play had been "to write a good play with a whacking great part in it for myself", he abandoned attempts to convince West End managements, and arranged to stage the play at the Everyman Theatre, Hampstead, a fringe venue in north London. When the money for the production threatened to run out during rehearsals, Coward secured the necessary funding from his friend the author Michael Arlen.

As well as co-starring, Coward directed the play. Upset by a last-minute revision that increased Coward's role and, she believed, diminished the importance of hers, the female star, Kate Cutler, dropped out less than two weeks before the premiere. Coward was able to engage the veteran actress Lilian Braithwaite, who accepted the part for the small salary offered and learned it at very short notice.

== Original production ==
Act II (left to right): Clara, Nicky, Florence, Tom, Helen, Pauncefort, Bunty and Bruce (original cast)

The Vortex opened at the Everyman Theatre, Hampstead, North London on 25 November 1924, with the following cast:

- Preston – Claire Keep
- Helen Saville – Mary Robson
- Pauncefort Quentin – F. Kinsey Peile
- Clara Hibbert – Millie Sim
- Florence Lancaster – Lilian Braithwaite
- Tom Veryan – Alan Hollis
- Nicky Lancaster – Noël Coward
- David Lancaster – Bromley Davenport
- Bunty Mainwaring – Molly Kerr
- Bruce Fairlight – Ivor Barnard

The production was well received for its passionate acting and became a sensation because of its scandalous subject matter. The production moved to the West End at the Royalty Theatre on 16 December 1924 and transferred to the Comedy Theatre in February 1925 and finally to The Little Theatre, closing on 16 June 1925. (Note: The German diplomat, Harry Graf Kessler, saw the play at the Comedy Theatre on 19 March 1925, and wrote in his diary: "Coward's performance is superb. With shattering realism and masterly restraint he acts the tragedy of the son of a vain, pleasure-seeking, depraved and heartless woman. The ending, though, is inconclusive because there is in fact no way out".) On the few occasions when Coward was unable to play the part, his role was taken by his understudy, John Gielgud. The sets and costumes were designed by Coward's friend Gladys Calthrop. The play also toured the British provinces, and Cutler, as Florence, eventually joined the now-proven show's cast. As Coward noted in his memoir Present Indicative, "The Press notices ... were, on the whole, enthusiastic." The Daily Mirror called the play "an interesting and, in some respects, a remarkable comedy". The Manchester Guardian had some reservations, but described the play as "genuinely and deeply interesting". The Observer also had reservations but thought parts of the play "the best thing Mr. Coward has yet done in playwriting." The Times opined: "It is a study that has wit, observation, and a sincerity, leaping out between flippances, which is its peculiar merit." Hannen Swaffer, a reviewer who became Coward's most implacable critic over the years, called it "the most decadent play of our time".

Produced by Joseph P. Bickerton, Jr., The Vortex opened in Washington, D.C., on 7 September 1925 and then on Broadway at the Henry Miller's Theatre on 16 September, closing in January 1926 after 157 performances. Coward and Basil Dean directed and the cast was:

- Preston – George Harcourt
- Helen Saville – Auriol Lee
- Pauncefort Quentin – Leo G. Carroll
- Clara Hibbert – Jeanette Sherwin
- Florence Lancaster – Lilian Braithwaite
- Tom Veryan – Alan Hollis
- Nicky Lancaster – Noël Coward
- David Lancaster – David Glassford
- Bunty Mainwaring – Molly Kerr
- Bruce Fairlight – Thomas Braidon.

This was followed by an American tour, in which Rose Hobart replaced Molly Kerr.

== Synopsis ==
Act I

Nicky Lancaster is a talented and fashionable, but feckless, young composer and pianist in post-World War I England. He is engaged to Bunty Mainwaring, a journalist; his mother Florence, an ageing socialite beauty, has extramarital affairs with younger men in an attempt to recapture her youth. She does not disguise these, creating society gossip. Her friend Helen advises her to accept ageing more gracefully. Florence's new young man, Tom, turns out to be Bunty's ex-fiancé, which makes Nicky jealous. Florence plans a weekend social gathering at the family's country house.

Act II

On Sunday evening the house party is in full swing, with Nicky playing the piano. Florence feels insecure about Tom, and she and Nicky quarrel. Helen discovers Nicky's drug habit and pleads with him to give it up. Nicky struggles with the simmering resentment he feels for his vainglorious and promiscuous mother, his own weakness for cocaine, and, in the view of some commentators, his repressed homosexuality. Bunty breaks off her engagement with Nicky and seeks Tom's comfort. Florence catches them kissing.

Act III

The next morning Helen asks Florence to think of her son, but Florence is more concerned with blaming Tom and Bunty. Nicky arrives as Helen leaves, and he and Florence quarrel more. He reveals his drug habit to her and begs her to give up her selfish ways and to behave like a mother. In the end, the two each agree to try to change, as Florence strokes Nicky's hair. (Note: Lahr comments that the final tableaux is the first real gesture of contact between mother and son in the play.)

== Revivals and adaptations ==
A 1952 revival played at the Theatre Royal, Brighton and the Lyric Theatre, Hammersmith, with Dirk Bogarde as Nicky and Isabel Jeans as Florence. Also in the cast were Adrianne Allen (Helen), Robert Andrews (Quentin), Sylvia Coleridge (Clara), Nicholas Hannen (David) and Peter Jones (Bruce). The production transferred to the Criterion Theatre, London, for 44 performances, with Michael Gough taking over as Nicky. The play was revived in 1974 at the Greenwich Theatre, London, with Vivien Merchant and Timothy Dalton; in New York City off-Broadway at the Diane Von Furstenburg Studio, The Theater, in 2001; and at the Donmar Warehouse in London in 2002. In 2008 the play was performed at the Apollo Theatre, London, starring Felicity Kendal as Florence and Dan Stevens as Nicky. The play was presented in Singapore by the British Theatre Playhouse from 27 April to 15 May 2016, starring Jane Seymour as Florence.

A 1928 film version starred Willette Kershaw as Florence and Ivor Novello as Nicky. Radio adaptations have been broadcast by the BBC, first in 1939 with Athene Seyler as Florence and John Chestle as Nicky; in 1958, with Fay Compton and David Spenser; in 1967 starring Joan Greenwood and Richard Briers, and in 1975 starring Elizabeth Sellars and Martin Jarvis. The play has been adapted for television on several occasions. In 1960 a BBC version starred Ann Todd and David McCallum as Florence and Nicky. In an ITV adaptation in 1964 those roles were played by Margaret Johnston and Nicholas Pennell. The BBC broadcast the play again in December 1969 as part of the celebrations of Coward's seventieth birthday. This version starred Margaret Leighton and Richard Warwick.

A production directed by Daniel Raggett played at the Chichester Festival Theatre in May 2023. It starred real-life mother and son Lia Williams as Florence and Joshua James as Nicky, with Priyanga Burford as Helen.

== Critical reception ==
In 1961 Kenneth Tynan described The Vortex as "a jeremiad against narcotics with dialogue that sounds today not so much stilted as high-heeled". In 2002 Benedict Nightingale suggested that although Tynan's comment was not without some truth, The Vortex was proving durable: "The play that shocked the Establishment in 1924 is more likely to endure than the play that, with Tynan's avid encouragement, did ditto in 1956: Look Back in Anger. That's largely because many of the objects of John Osborne's ire … have disappeared into history. The Vortex dates less because it gives a twist to a timeless episode in Hamlet." In a review of Peter Hall's 2008 production Christopher Hart wrote in The Sunday Times that the climactic confrontation between Nicky and Florence is "suddenly, less brittle Coward than howling Strindberg, all revulsion and choking disgust at life in general and 'the utter foulness of growing old' in particular. These two damaged but hitherto seemingly trivial characters powerfully draw our empathy now, in all their weltering petulance, vanity and self-pity."

== Notes, references and sources ==
=== Sources ===
- Castle, Charles (1972). Noël. London: W H Allen. ISBN 978-0-491-00534-0.
- Coward, Noël; Sheridan Morley (1989) [1979]. Plays, One. London: Methuen. ISBN 978-1-4081-7731-0.
- Coward, Noël (2004) [1932]. Present Indicative – Autobiography to 1931. London: Methuen. ISBN 978-0-413-77413-2.
- Hoare, Philip (1995). Noël Coward, A Biography. London: Sinclair-Stevenson. ISBN 978-1-85619-265-1.
- Kessler, Harry (2000). Charles Kessler (ed.). The Diaries of a Cosmopolitan: 1918–1937. London: Phoenix Press. ISBN 1-84212-061-1.
- Lahr, John (1982). Coward the Playwright. London: Methuen. ISBN 978-0-413-48050-7.
- Lesley, Cole (1976). The Life of Noël Coward. London: Cape. ISBN 978-0-224-01288-1.
- Mander, Raymond; Joe Mitchenson (1957). Theatrical Companion to Coward. London: Rockliff. OCLC 470106222.
- Mander, Raymond; Joe Mitchenson (2000) [1957]. Barry Day; Sheridan Morley (eds.). Theatrical Companion to Coward (Second ed.). London: Oberon Books. ISBN 978-1-84002-054-0.
- Morley, Sheridan (1974) [1969]. A Talent to Amuse. London: Penguin. ISBN 978-0-14-003863-7.
- Sinfield, Alan (2000). "Coward and Effeminacy". In Kaplan, Joel; Stowel, Sheila (eds.). Look Back in Pleasure: Noël Coward Reconsidered. London: Methuen. ISBN 978-0-413-75500-1.
- Tynan, Kenneth (1964). Tynan on Theatre. Harmondsworth, UK: Penguin. OCLC 949598.
