= Elinor Kershaw =

American actress

- Thomas Ince, Elinor Kershaw, and children, c. 1920.
- Born: December 20, 1885; St. Louis, Missouri, U.S.
- Died: September 12, 1971 (aged 86); Hollywood, California, U.S.
- Occupation: Actress
- Spouses: Thomas H. Ince (m. 1907; died 1924) Holmes Herbert (m. 1930, divorced)
- Children: 3
- Relatives: Willette Kershaw (sister)

Elinor Priscilla Kershaw, also known as Nell Ince or Alice Kershaw (December 20, 1885 – September 12, 1971) was an American stage and motion-picture actor. Through her influence, future Hollywood mogul Thomas H. Ince first encountered the world of film because although they were both stage actors, he in "For Love's Sweet Sake" and she in another play at the same theater, she also had a lucrative contract with the Biograph company, while he was "relatively poor." He only made one Biograph appearance in "His New Lid" before deciding he'd rather be a producer and director than an actor.

Kershaw's stage name was Alice Kershaw. After their marriage on October 19, 1907, two of their three children were writer Thomas Harper Ince, Jr. (1912-1970), and actor Richard Kershaw Ince (1915-1938); the third son was eldest child William Thompson Ince (1909-1972), who became a doctor. Her husband did not make her a full financial partner in his films, but she held stock in some of the companies that supported him.

Her older sister was the stage actress Willette Kershaw. Nell Kershaw Ince owned several properties in Hollywood, including the elegant Villa Carlotta on Franklin Avenue where Louella Parsons lived, and the Château Élysée in Los Angeles, which she had built as a luxury long-term residential apartment house for movie stars.

She married actor Holmes Herbert in 1930, thus forfeiting her share of the principal of her late husband's $1.600,000 estate, although she could still receive interest. They later divorced.

== Filmography ==
- The Love of Lady Irma (1910)
- Taming a Husband (1910)
- One Night and Then (1910)
- The Course of True Love (1910)
- Phone 1707 Chester (1911)
