= The Vortex (film) =

1928 film directed by Adrian Brunel

- Directed by: Adrian Brunel
- Written by: Noël Coward (play); Eliot Stannard; Roland Pertwee
- Produced by: Michael Balcon; C. M. Woolf
- Starring: Ivor Novello; Willette Kershaw; Simeon Stuart; Julie Suedo
- Cinematography: James Wilson
- Production company: Gainsborough Pictures
- Distributed by: Woolf & Freedman Film Service
- Release date: 1928
- Country: United Kingdom
- Language: English

The Vortex is a 1928 British drama film directed by Adrian Brunel and starring Ivor Novello, Willette Kershaw and Simeon Stuart. It was an adaptation of the Noël Coward play The Vortex and was made by Gainsborough Studios. The film's sets were designed by Clifford Pember.

The film was a financial failure.

== Cast ==
- Ivor Novello – Nicky Lancaster
- Willette Kershaw – Florence Lancaster
- Frances Doble – Bunty Mainwaring
- Alan Hollis – Tom Veryan
- Simeon Stuart – David Lancaster
- Kinsey Peile – Pouncefort Quentin
- Julie Suedo – Anna Vollof
- Dorothy Fane – Helen Saville
