= Château Élysée =

Hollywood building for Scientology Celebrity Centre

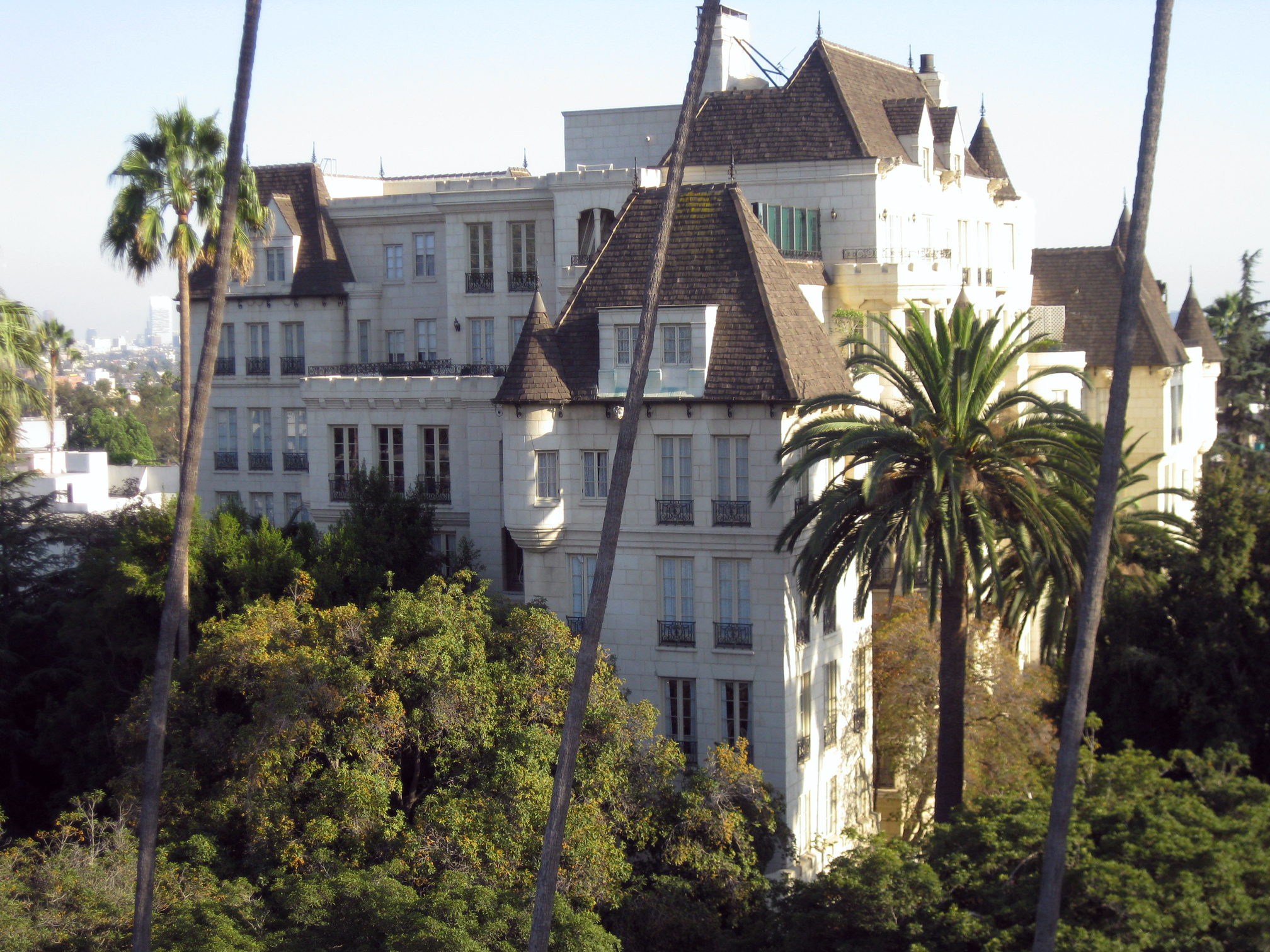
- Interactive map of the Château Élysée area

General information
- Architectural style: Châteauesque
- Location: 5930 Franklin Ave, Los Angeles, California
- Coordinates: 34°6′16″N 118°19′08″W
- Completed: 1927
- Owner: Church of Scientology Celebrity Centre International

Technical details
- Floor count: 7
- Floor area: 86,204 sq ft (8,008.6 m^{2})

Design and construction
- Architect: Arthur E. Harvey
- Main contractor: Luther T. Mayo, Inc.

Château Élysée is a 1920s replica of a 17th-century French-Normandy chateau in Hollywood, California. Owned by the Church of Scientology, it is the home of Celebrity Centre International and the Manor Hotel. It is located at 5930 Franklin Avenue in the Franklin Village section of Los Angeles, California.

== History ==
In 1927, Elinor "Nell" Ince, commissioned architect Arthur E. Harvey and contractor Luther T. Mayo, Inc. to build a luxury long-term residential apartment house for movie stars and the film industry.

"The chateau was to be an apartment house and long-term grand hotel for both the Hollywood and international elite, supplying daily housekeeping and fine dining. For recreation, the grounds included a moat, formal gardens, tennis courts, and rooftop and patio entertainment spaces. Nell enlisted it-girl interior designer Marjorie Requa, the willowy blue blood who decorated Pickfair, to create sophisticated interiors inspired by Louis XIV, Piccadilly, and French-Norman styles."
—Hadley Meares, journalist, KCET

In 1943, Ince sold the property, and in 1951, the home was converted into a luxury retirement home called Fifield Manor. By the 1970s, the building was slated for demolition and was purchased by the Church of Scientology.

On September 23, 1987, the City of Los Angeles declared the building a Los Angeles Historic-Cultural Monument, number 329, encompassing the addresses 5925-5939 Yucca Street, 5930-5936 Franklin Avenue, and 1806-1830 Tamarind Avenue.

== Church of Scientology ==
In 1969, the building began being used by the Church of Scientology for its Celebrity Centre International. They purchased the building in 1973 for $1 million. In the 1990s, the building and grounds were renovated, and by 2013 the value of the property was estimated at $75 million.

The Manor Hotel operates on several of the floors and the rest of the building is the Celebrity Centre. Guided tours are available to the general public.

The Renaissance Restaurant, located in the conservatory, has described itself as an "Award-winning five-star restaurant serving fresh organic and preservative-free French-Californian cuisine." The restaurant was previously open to the public, but it is now only open to Scientologists, their guests, and occasional visitors.
