= Willette Kershaw =

American actress (1882–1960)

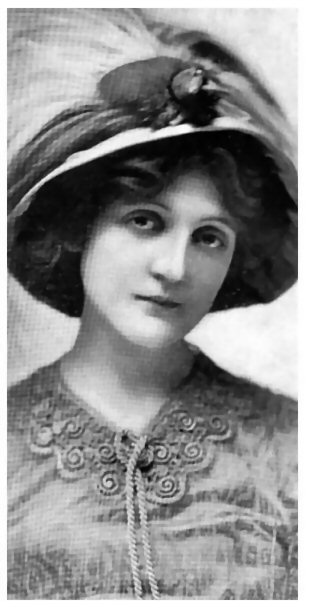
- The Theatre Magazine, 1911
- Born: Willette Kershaw; June 17, 1882; St. Louis, Missouri, United States
- Died: May 4, 1960 (aged 77); Honolulu, Hawaii
- Occupation: actress
- Years active: 1905–1928
- Spouses: Albert Morrison; David Sturges; W.K. Lamar; Richard Schuster
- Relatives: Elinor Kershaw (sister); John E. Ince, Sr. (father-in-law); John E. Ince, Jr. (brother-in-law)

Willette Kershaw (June 17, 1882 – May 4, 1960) was an American Broadway stage actress and later silent film actress.

== Early life ==
The daughter of Harry Kershaw, she was born in St. Louis. Her younger sister was actress Elinor Kershaw.

Kershaw graduated from Central High School and the Lindley School of Dramatic Art.

== Career ==
Kershaw's Broadway credits include Yes or No (1917), The Unchastened Woman (1915), A Pair of White Gloves (1913), The Switchboard (1913), Snobs (1911), The Country Boy (1910), The Heights (1910), and Robert Burns (1905).

Kershaw married actor Arthur Morrison, and the marriage ended in 1909. In 1923, Kershaw married David Sturgis in New Rochelle, New York.

== Filmography ==
- Men (1918)
- Cecilia of the Pink Roses (1918)
- The Sporting Life (1918)
- The Vortex (1928)
