= Main Street (Los Angeles) =

Major north-south thoroughfare in Los Angeles, California

- Length: 20.9 mi (33.6 km)
- Location: Los Angeles County, California, United States
- South end: Lomita Boulevard at the Carson–Wilmington line
- Major junctions: I-405 in Carson; SR 91 in Carson
- North end: Mission Road / Valley Boulevard in Lincoln Heights

Main Street is a 21-mile-long (34 km) major north–south thoroughfare in Los Angeles, California. It serves as the east–west postal divider for the city and the county as well.

== Route description ==
From the northeast, Main Street begins as a continuation of Valley Boulevard west of Mission Road in Lincoln Heights as 'North Main Street'.

Main Street enters Downtown Los Angeles passing by the edge of the Los Angeles Plaza. It continues through the Civic Center area, which is built on top of the site of the buildings — nearly all demolished — that in the 1880s through 1900s formed the city's Central Business District. At 3rd Street it enters the Historic Core district. At 9th Street, it merges with Spring Street in Downtown LA, and between Cesar E. Chavez Avenue and 9th Street, Main Street shares a one-way couplet with Spring Street.

Main Street continues south through South Los Angeles and enters Carson 2 miles (3.2 km) north at the intersection of Lomita Boulevard. In Wilmington Main Street moniker ends, the street continuing on as Wilmington Boulevard.

== Landmarks ==
=== Buildings and sites north of U.S. Route 101 ===
- Lincoln Park
- Los Angeles Plaza Historic District

=== Buildings and sites from U.S. Route 101 to Third Street ===
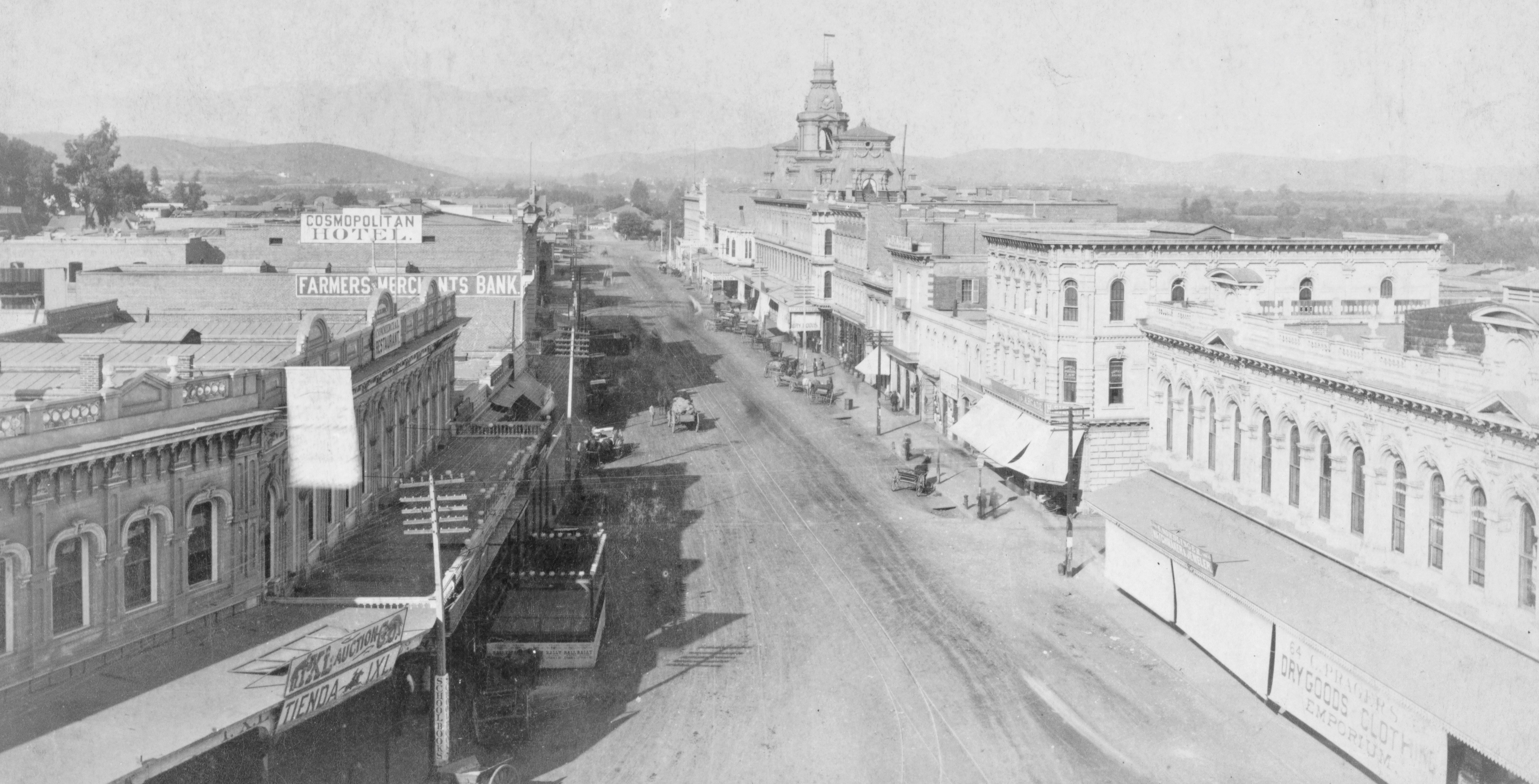
Main Street looking north from Temple, photo by T.E. Stanton, 1886. The Baker Block is the prominent building towards the back. Left side: Cosmopolitan Hotel, Farmers and Merchants Bank , Downey Block with Commercial Restaurant.

=== Main from Plaza south to Arcadia ===
==== Gallery (west side) ====
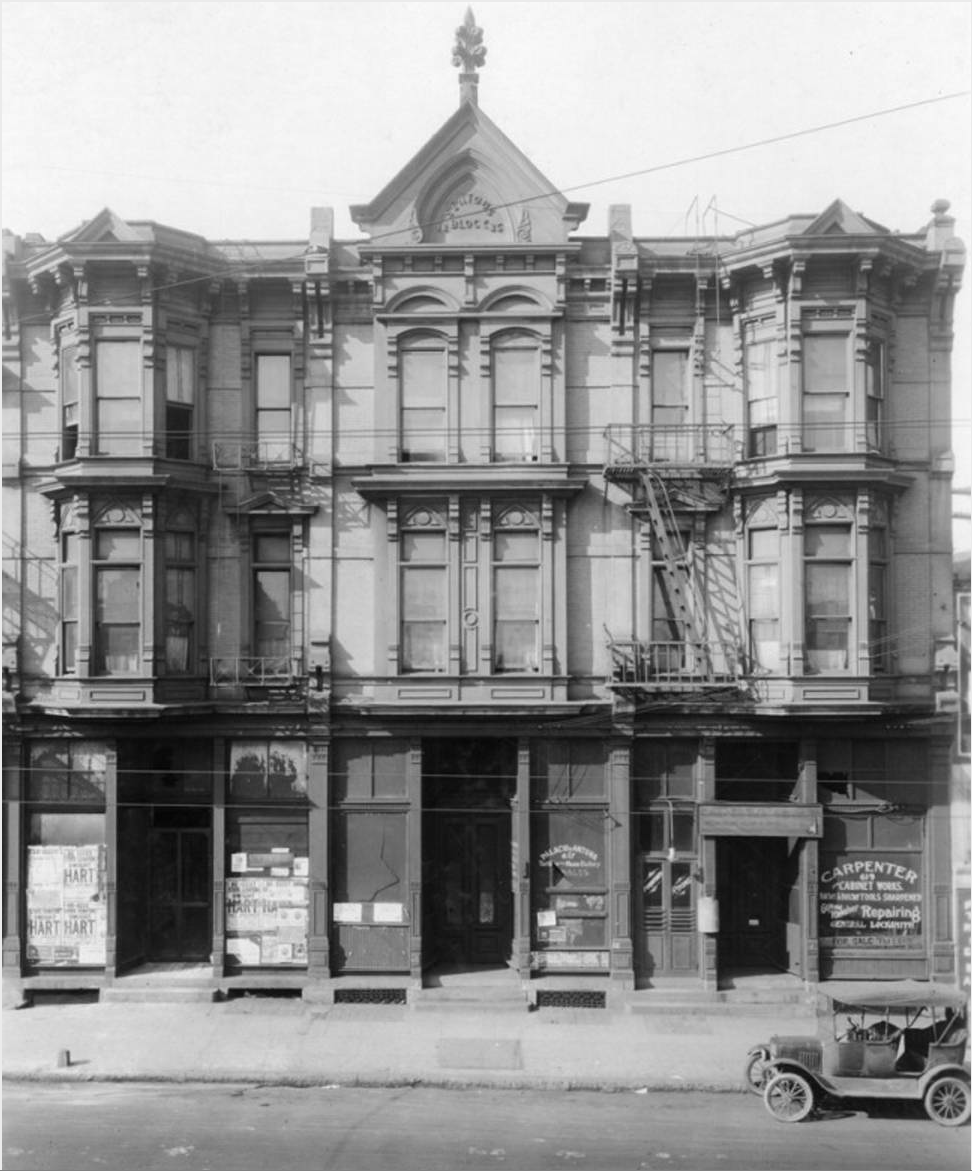
Sentous Block a.k.a. Sentous Building, 1920

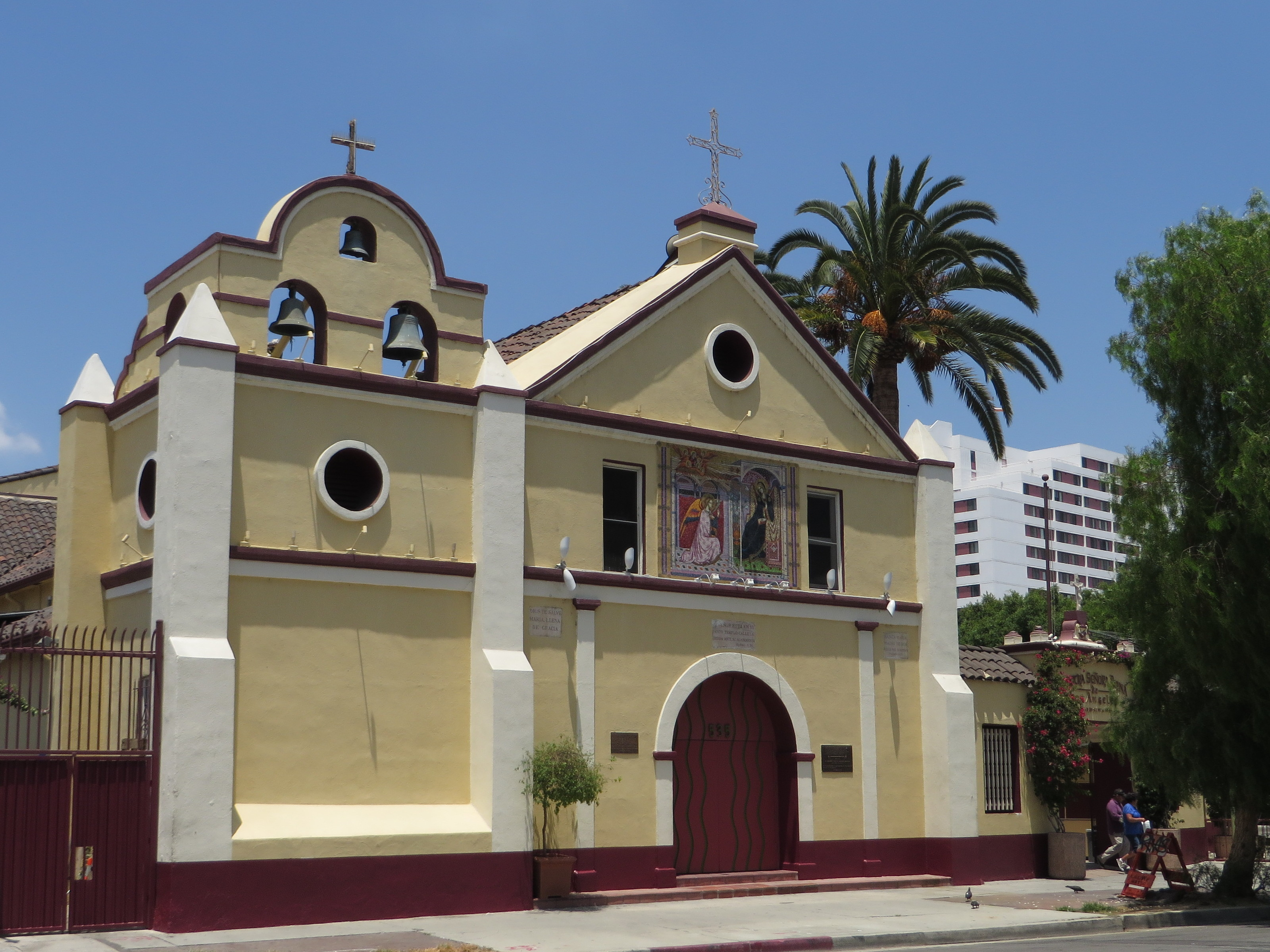
La Placita Church (La Iglesia de Nuestra Señora la Reina de los Ángeles)

Vickrey-Brunswig Building

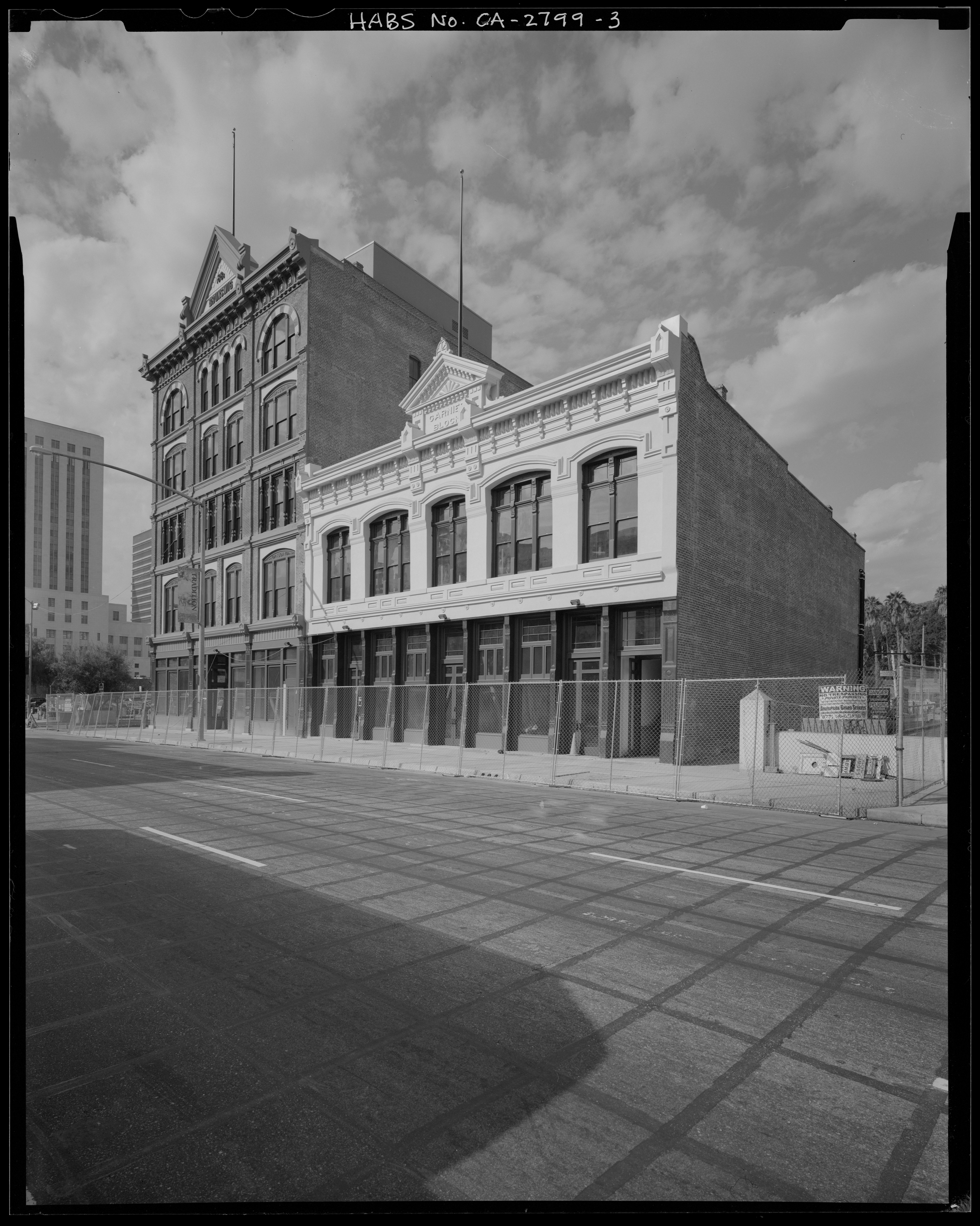
Vickrey-Brunswig Building and Plaza House

==== Gallery (east side) ====
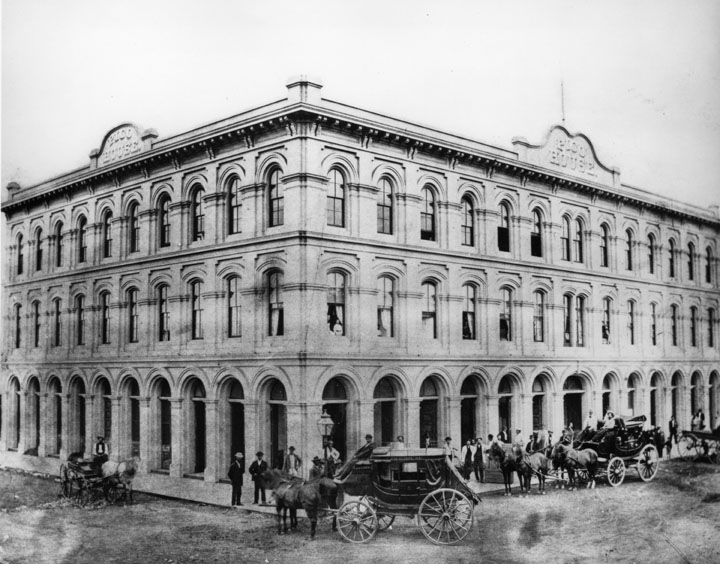
Pico House in 1875

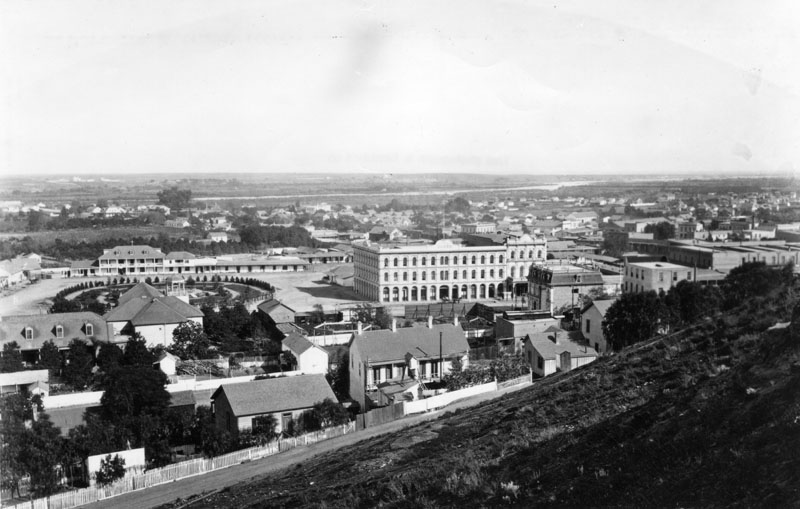
Pico House and the Plaza in 1876, photo taken from Fort Moore

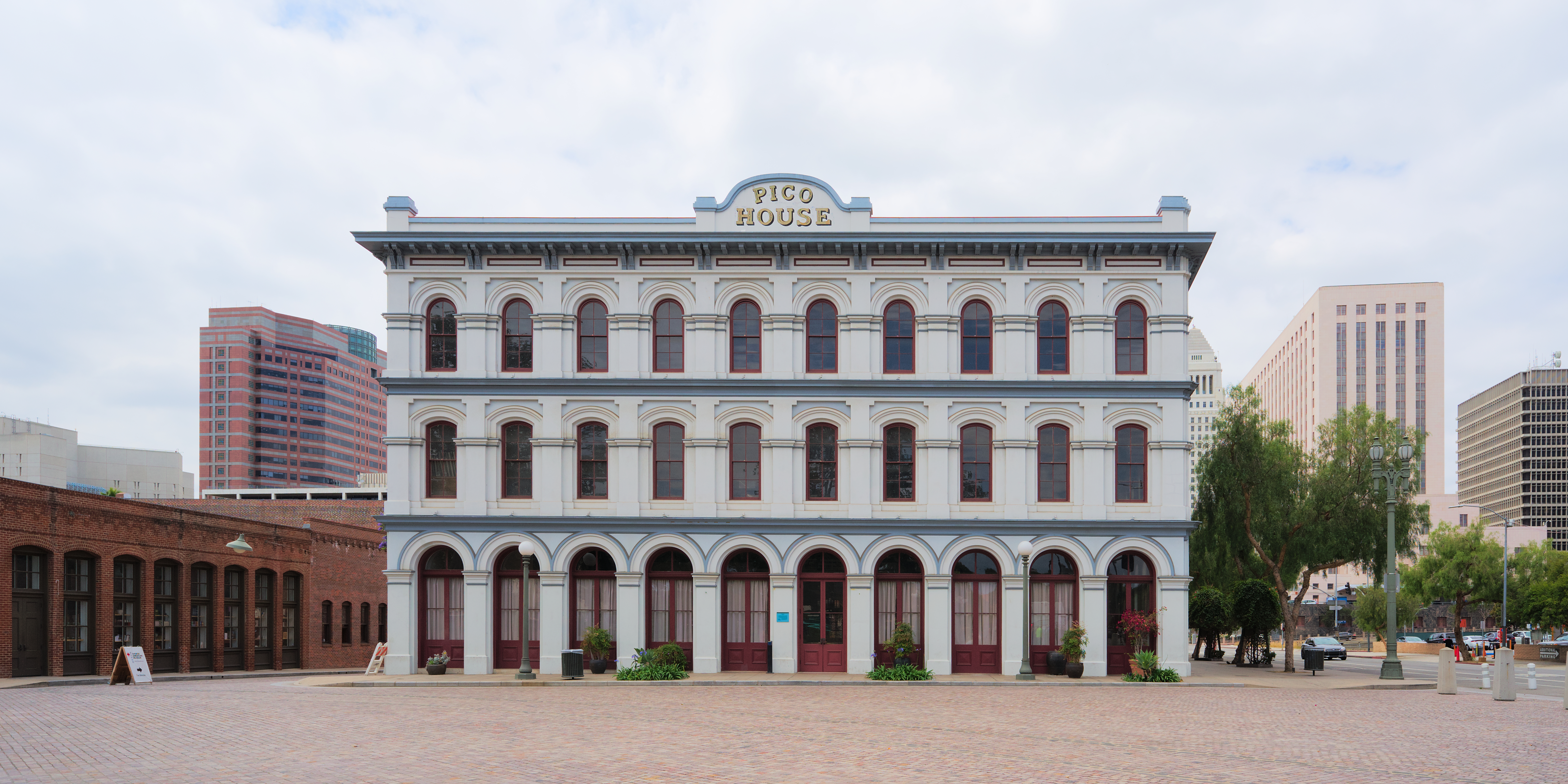
Pico House today

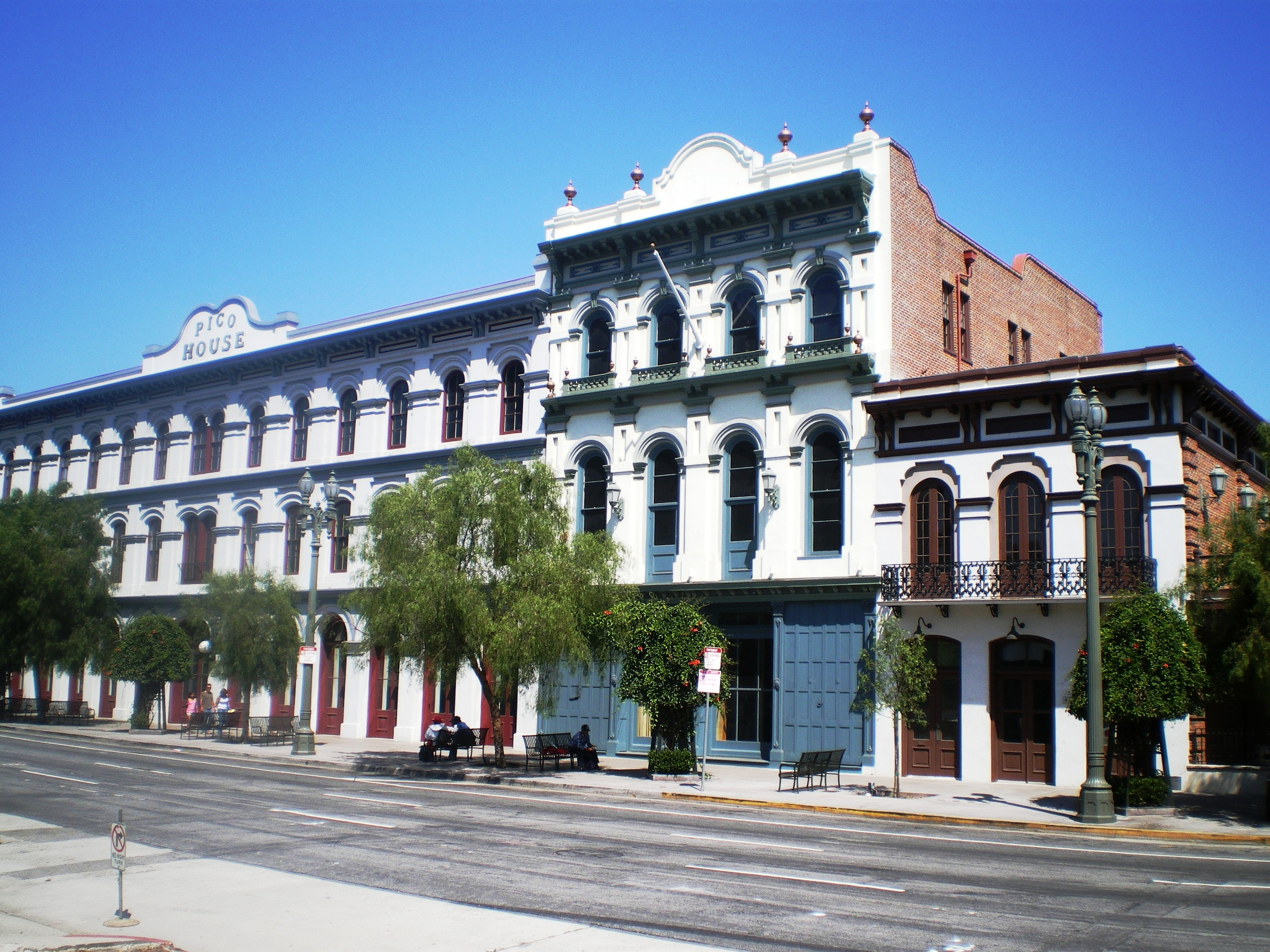
Pico House, Merced Theater and Masonic Hall

==== Pico House ====
Pico House was a luxury hotel built in 1870 by Pío Pico, a successful businessman who was the last Mexican Governor of Alta California. With indoor plumbing, gas-lit chandeliers, a grand double staircase, lace curtains, and a French restaurant, the Italianate three-story, 33-room hotel was the most elegant hotel in Southern California. It had a total of nearly eighty rooms. The Pico House is listed as a California Historical Landmark (No. 159).

==== Masonic Hall ====
Masonic Hall at 416 N. Main St., was built in 1858 as Lodge 42 of the Free and Accepted Masons. The building was a painted brick structure with a symbolic "Masonic eye" below the parapet. In 1868, the Masons moved to larger quarters further south. Afterward, the building was used for many purposes, including a pawn shop and boarding house. It is the oldest building in Los Angeles south of the Plaza.

==== Merced Theater ====
The Merced Theater, completed in 1870, was built in an Italianate style and operated as a live theatre from 1871 to 1876. When the Woods Opera House opened nearby in 1876, the Merced ceased being the city's leading theatre. Eventually, it gained an "unenviable reputation" because of "the disreputable dances staged there, and was finally closed by the authorities."

==== Plaza House ====
This two-story building at 507–511 N. Main St. houses part of the LA Plaza de Cultura y Artes, which includes the Vickrey -Brunswig Building next door. It is inscribed on its upper floor, and on 1890s maps it is marked, "Garnier Block" (not to be confused with the Garnier Block/Building on Los Angeles Street, one block away). Commissioned in 1883 by Philippe Garnier, once housed the "La Esperanza" bakery.

==== Vickrey-Brunswig Building ====
This five-story brick building facing the Plaza at 501 N. Main St. houses LA Plaza de Cultura y Artes, which also occupies the Plaza House next door. It was built in 1888 and combines Italianate and Victorian architecture; the architect was Robert Brown Young.

==== Site of Sentous Building ====
The Sentous Block or Sentous Building (19th c., demolished late 1950s) was located at 615-9 N Main St., with a back entrance on 616-620 North Spring St. (previously called Upper Main St., then San Fernando St.). Designed in 1886 by Burgess J. Reeve. Louis Sentous was a French pioneer in the early days of Los Angeles. The San Fernando Theatre was located here. The site is now part of the El Pueblo parking lot.

=== West side of Main from Republic south to Temple ===
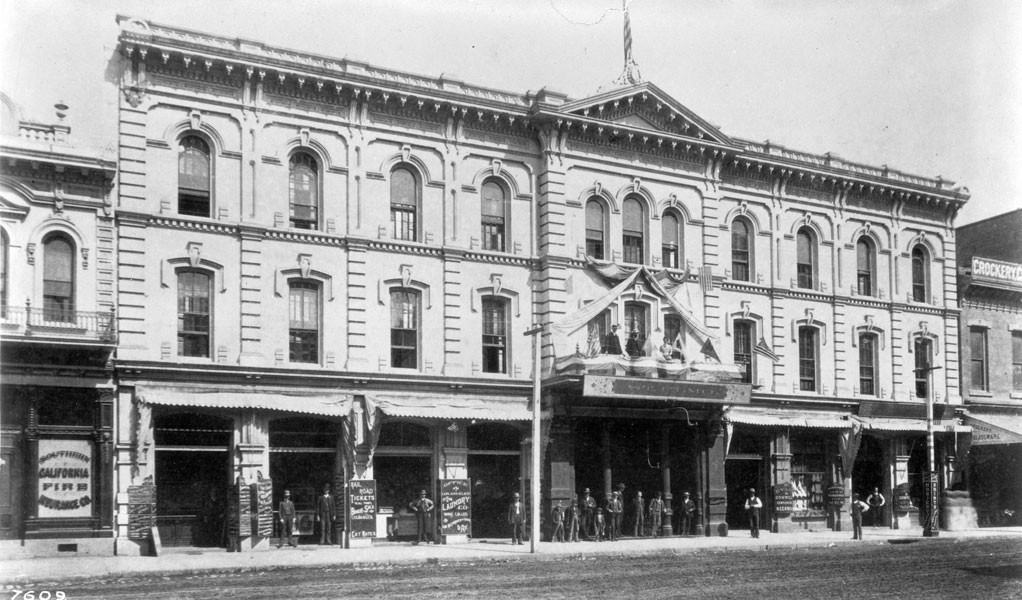
St. Elmo (orig. Lafayette) Hotel circa 1890

This block is part of the site of the current Spring Street Courthouse. Buildings previously located here include:

- Lafayette Hotel, 343 N. Main, opened in the 1850s, c. 1882 renamed the Cosmopolitan Hotel, then the St. Elmo Hotel. Razed in 1933.
- Farmers and Merchants Bank of Los Angeles location from 1874 through 1883, after leaving their original quarters in the Pico Building. Architect Ezra F. Kysor.

==== Northwest corner of Temple and Main ====
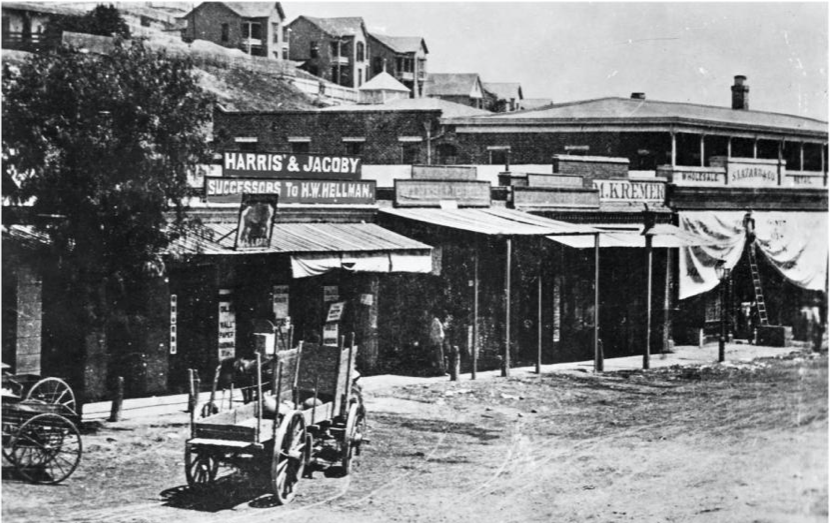
View to the NW of Old Downey Block, c. 1870, before Downey Block was built in 1871: "Harris & Jacoby", forerunners to Harris & Frank and Jacoby Bros., and M. Kremer, forerunner of the City of Paris, the city's first department store

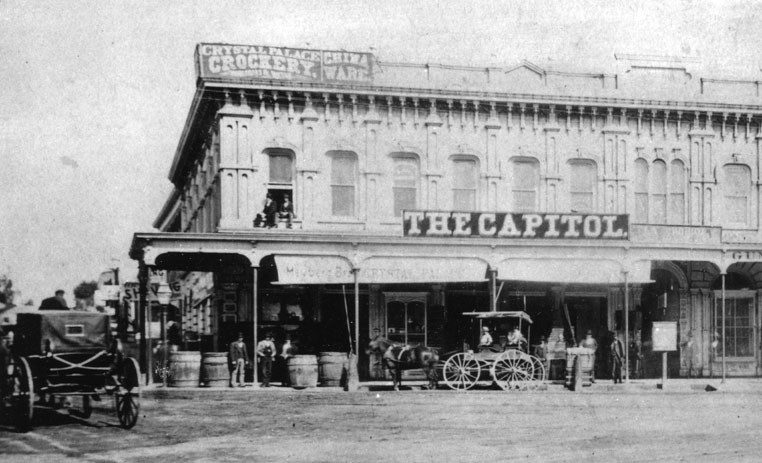
South end of the Downey Block, at the NW corner of Temple/Main, 1880s

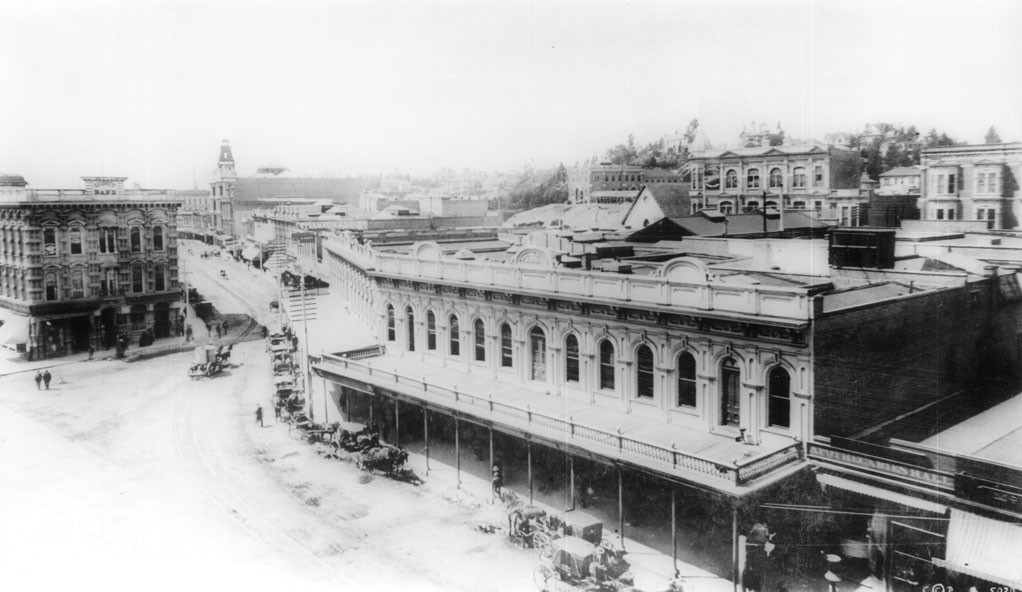
North end of the Downey Block along the west side of Main St., 1887. Temple Block at left; Spring Street runs towards the Phillips Block (tower) in the background at center-left.

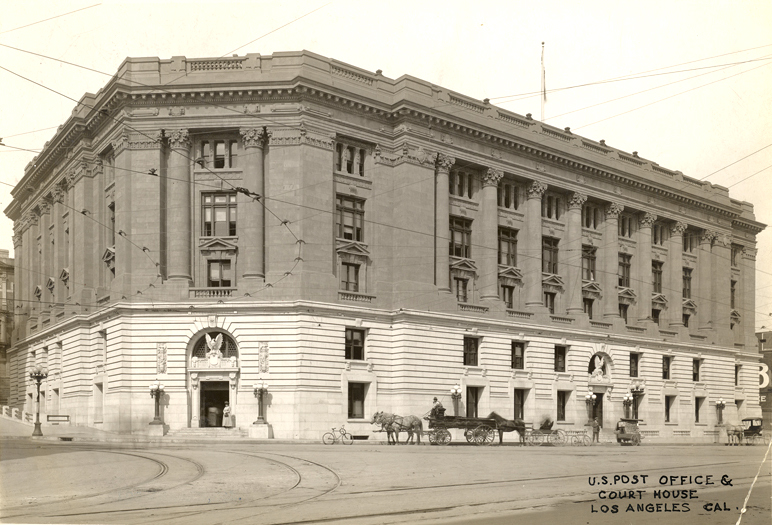
1910 Post Office and Courthouse which replaced the Downey Block NW corner Temple and Main

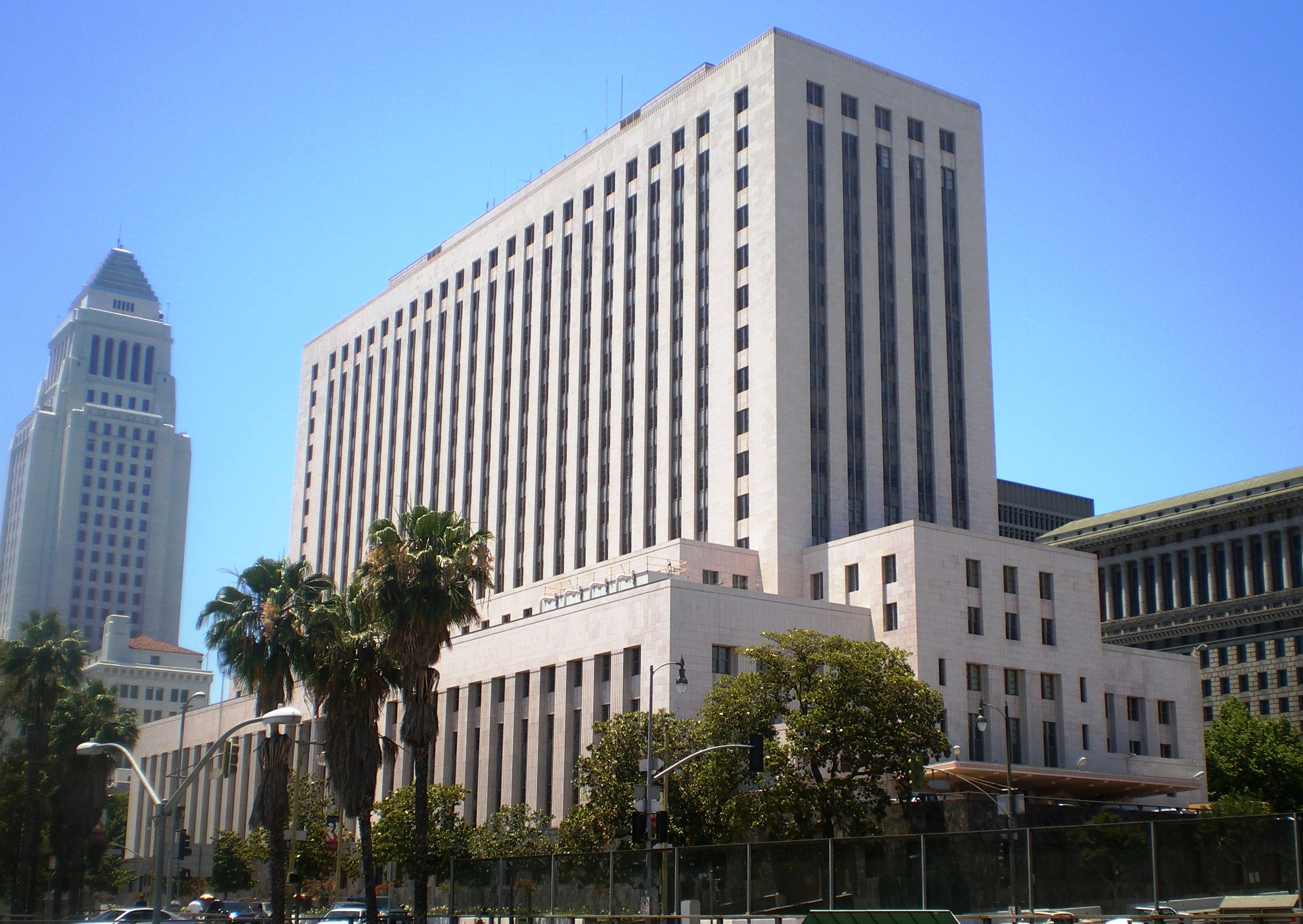
The 1940 Spring Street Courthouse, NW corner Temple/Main, 2008

On this corner stood four buildings in succession, the first two of which had a key role in the history of retail in Southern California, as it was home to a number of upscale retailers who would later grow to be big names in the city, and some, regional chains.

- Old Downey Block (?-1871), northwest corner of Temple and Main, Replaced by the Downey Block (1871-1910). Retailers that got their start here included Harris & Jacoby, forerunners to the Harris & Frank clothing chain and the large Jacoby Bros. department store; and M. Kremer, forerunner of the Los Angeles City of Paris.
- Downey Block (1871–1910), replaced by the New Post Office in 1910. Retailers who were located here included Coulter's (1878-9), Jacoby Bros. (1878-9), and Quincy Hall (1876–1882), forerunner of Harris & Frank.
- New Post Office also known as the Federal Building (1910–1937). Razed in 1937 and replaced by a new Federal Building now known as the Spring Street Courthouse, opened in 1940.
- Spring Street Courthouse, opened in 1940.

=== East side of Main from Arcadia south to Commercial ===
==== Baker Block ====
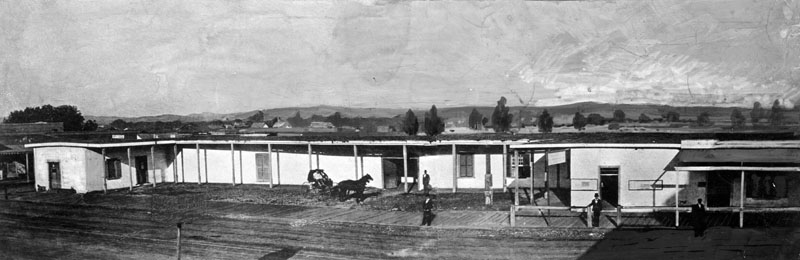
Abel Sterns adobe c. 1857. Built in 1835-1838, demolished in 1877 to make way for the Baker Block

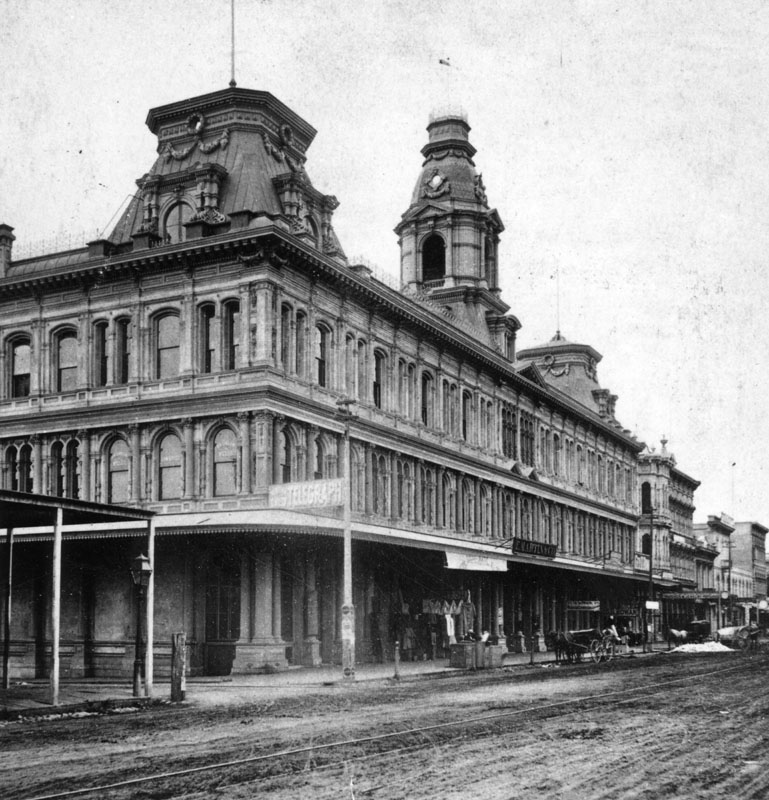
Baker Block, built 1878, demolished 1942, site now under US 101 freeway. Photo c. 1880

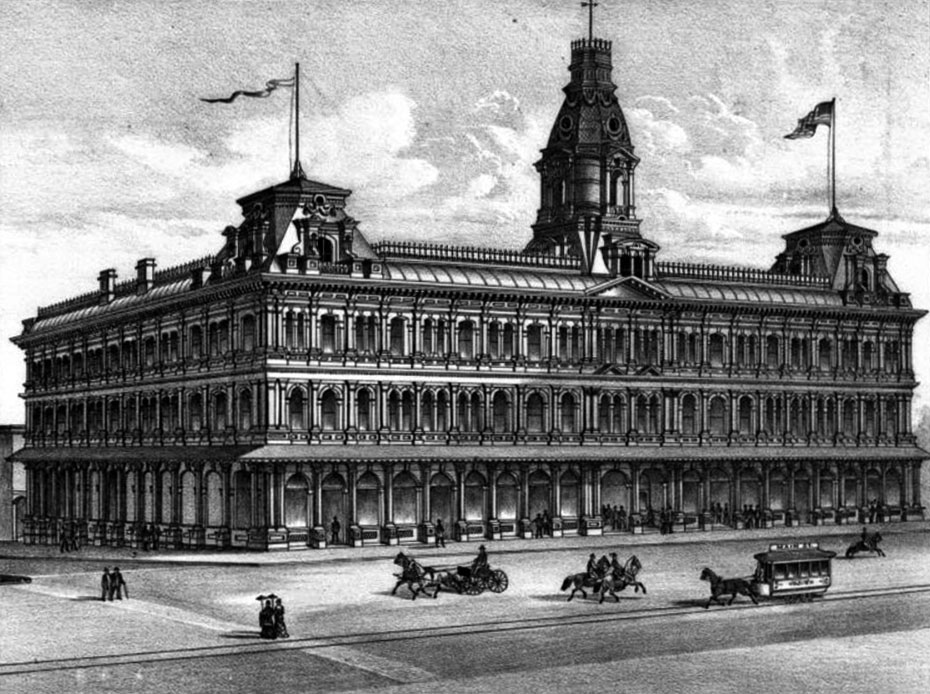
Lithograph of the Baker Block
- Baker Block, 334–348** N. Main at the southeast corner of Arcadia Street, opened late 1878, Second Empire architecture. The Baker Block was erected on the site of Don Abel Stearns' adobe mansion also called El Palacio, built in 1835-1838 and demolished in August and September of 1877; Col. Robert S. Baker who had the Baker Block built, had married Stearns' widow, Arcadia Bandini de Stearns Baker. When built, it was called the "finest emporium of commerce south of San Francisco". The ground floor housed retail tenants such as Coulter's (1879–1884), George D. Rowan and Eugene Germain. The second floor was offices, and the third floor held the city's most upscale apartments. In 1919, Goodwill Industries bought the building and opened its store and operations. That is not to say though, that nobody fought to save the building. The Metropolitan Garden Association tried to move the Baker Block to another location for use as a public recreation center, while city councilman Arthur E. Briggs raised funds to convert the building into a city history museum. Nonetheless, in 1941, Goodwill sold the building to the city, which demolished it in 1942. Currently, the US 101 freeway, and the new, more southerly route of Arcadia Street, run over most of the site.

==== South of Baker Block ====
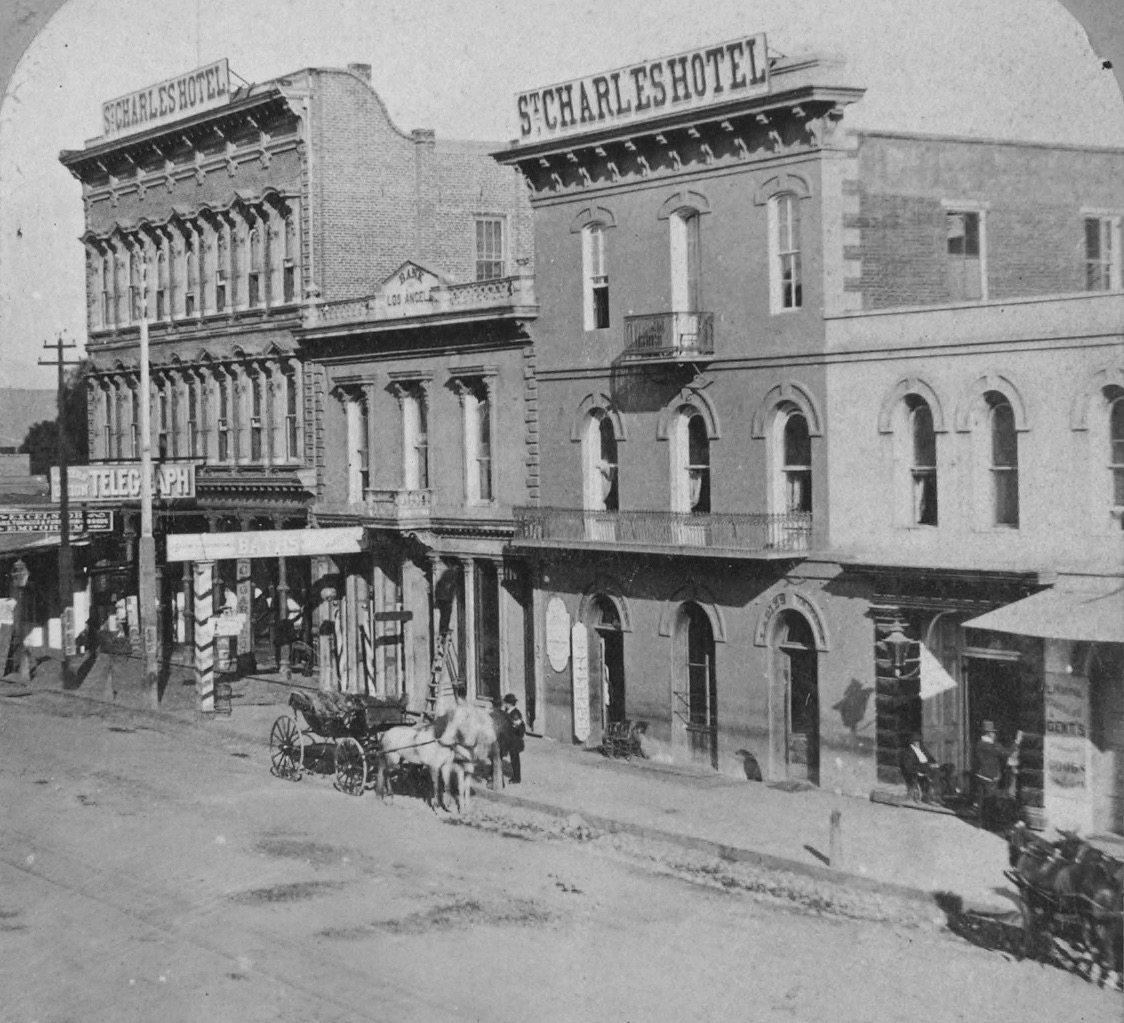
c. late 1870s: Grand Central Hotel branded as part of the St. Charles, Bank of Los Angeles in the Pico Bldg., St. Charles hotel proper, 312 bldg. and L. Harris store, forerunner of Harris & Frank

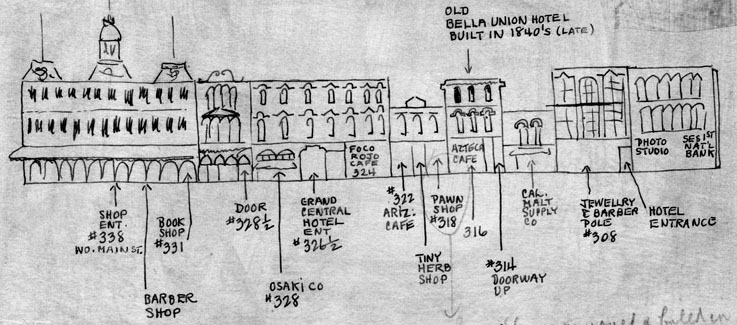
Sketch of east side of the 300 block of North Main Street, between Arcadia and Commercial streets, as it appeared circa 1880

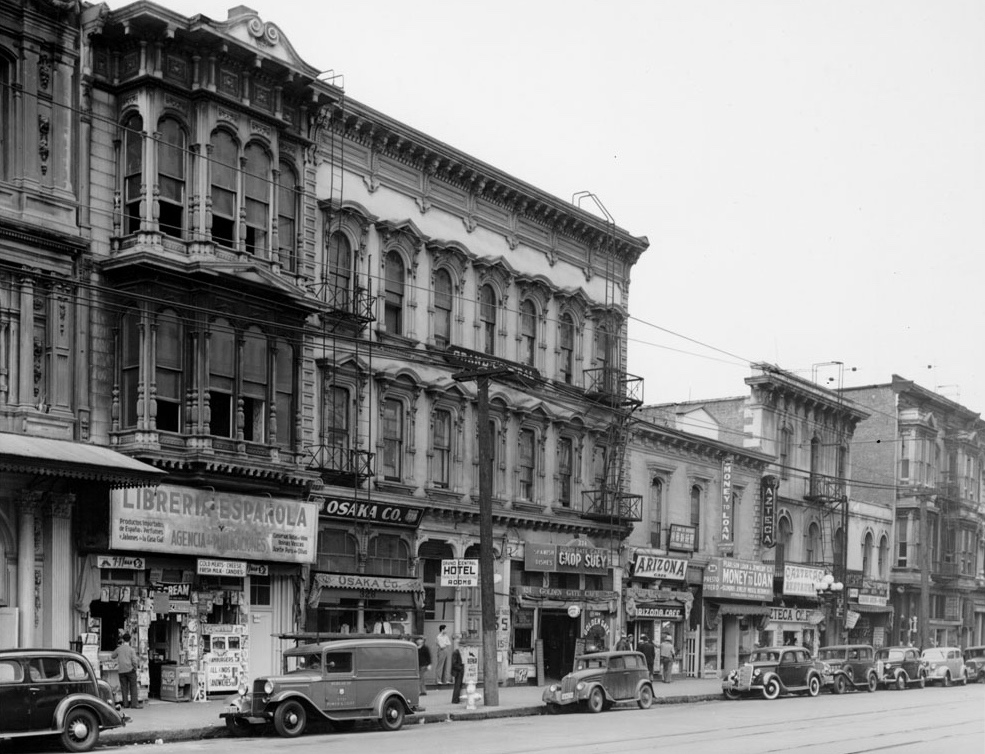
Downey ("Libería Española"), Grand Central ("Osaka Co.", "Chop Suey"), Pico ("Arizona Cafe", "Money to Loan"), Bella Union/St Charles ("Azteca"), 312 and 306-8 buildings, 1930s.

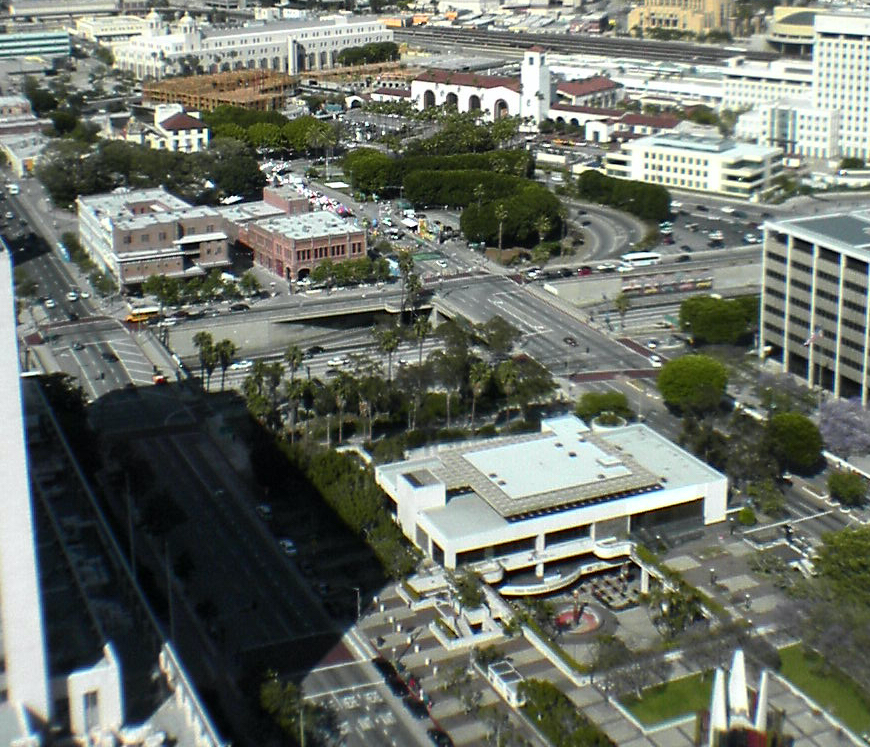
2005 view. Main St. runs along the left (west) side from the Plaza area (top left), over US 101 (site of the Baker Block) and along the western edge of the Los Angeles Mall (bottom center), site of the buildings described below (Downey Building through Ducommun Block).

South of the Baker Block stood buildings that are now the site of the northwestern-most part of the Los Angeles Mall:

- Downey Building (not to be confused with the "Downey Block"), 324–330** N. Main, opened 1878, three stories, captured in a 1957 color photo standing alone as the last building on the block, demolished that year. In the 1930s photo above, it is home to the Librería Española.
- Grand Central Hotel, opened 1876, demolished.
- Pico Building, 318-322** N. Main, opened 1867, the city’s first bank building, to house the new Hellman, Temple & Co. bank, then in 1871 the first location of Hellman’s own bank Farmers and Merchants Bank of Los Angeles, forerunner of Security Pacific National Bank. Later tenants included the Los Angeles County Bank (1874-1878), Charles H. Bush, jeweler and watchmaker (1878-1905), Louis E. Pearlson’s jewelry, loan and pawnshop (from 1905), as well as several barber shops and then a succession of owner-operated restaurants. The last occupants were a jewelers and the Mexican restaurant Arizona Cafe #2. Demolished 1957 to make way for a parking lot.
- Bella Union Hotel, later the St. Charles Hotel, 314–316** N. Main. Opened 1835, demolished 1940. Home to the Azteca Cafe in the 1930s.
- 312 N. Main, two stories, home to a saloon in the mid-1890s
- 306–308 N. Main, three stories, home to offices (at #308) and Bright's Cheap Store (#306) in 1882.

- Ducommun Block or Ducommun Building, 300-2-4** N. Main (200-2-4* N. Main). In the 1880s, home to the Ducommun hardware store, a furniture store and Prager Dry Goods. In the early 20th century, site of the Security Pacific National Bank. Home to the Federal Theatre from c. 1913–1917.

The Los Angeles Mall replaced these blocks; it is a small shopping center at the Los Angeles Civic Center, between Main and Los Angeles Streets on the north and south sides of Temple Street, connected by both a pedestrian bridge and a tunnel. It features Joseph Young's sculpture Triforium, with 1,500 blown-glass prisms synchronized to an electronic glass bell carillon. The mall opened in 1974 and includes a four-level parking garage with 2,400 spaces.

=== East side of Main from Commercial south to First ===
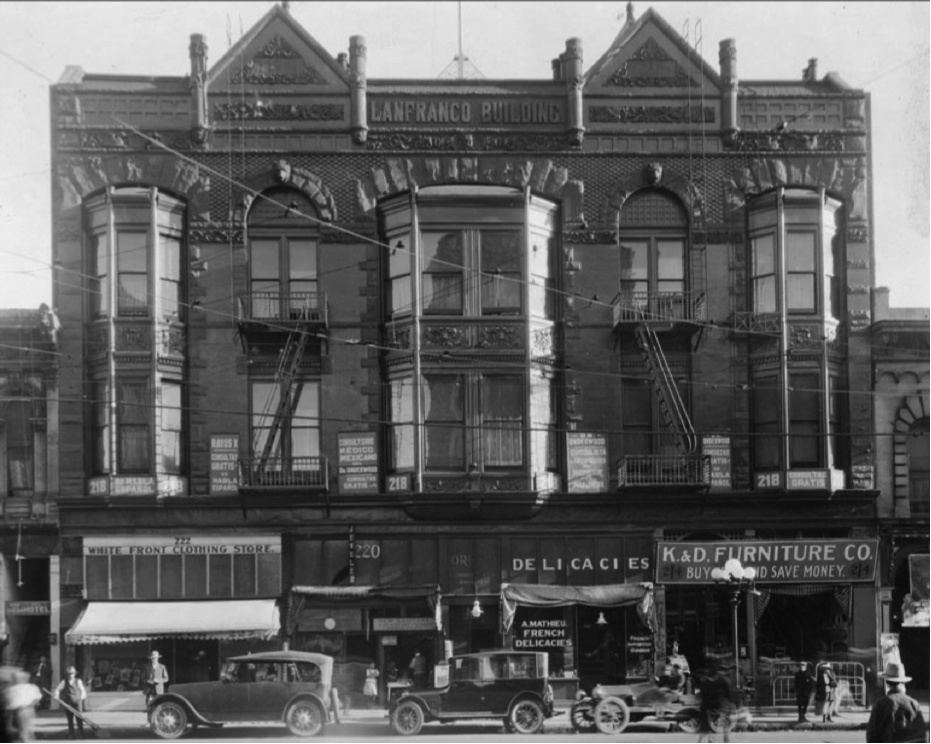
The 1888 New Lanfranco Block, early 1920s

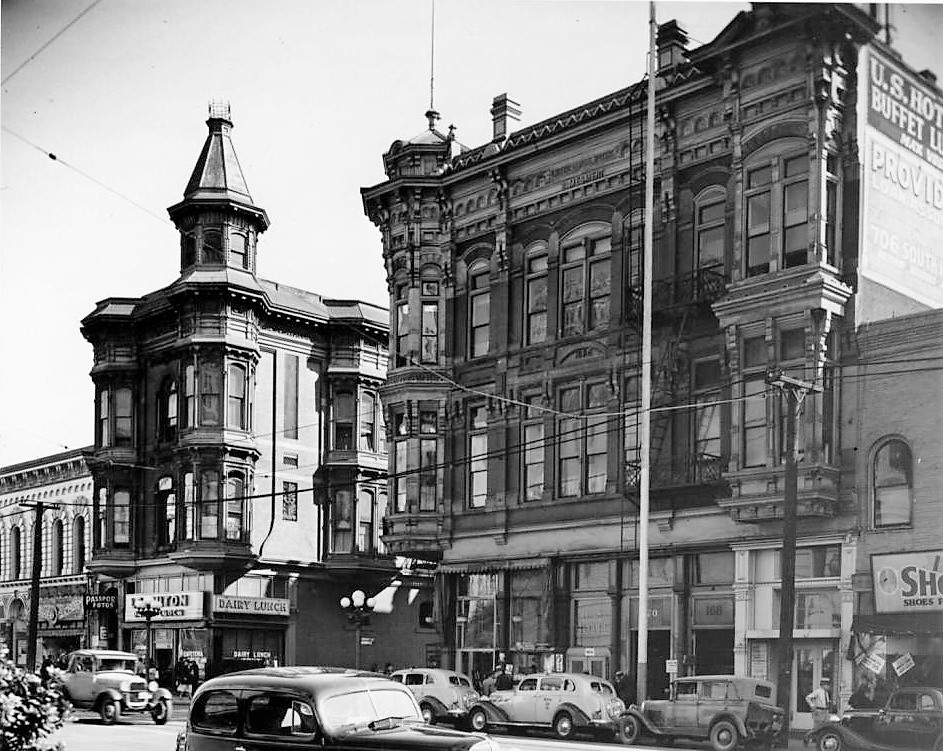
Main and Requena: United States Hotel right, Victorian 200–202 N. Main at left (Southern Pacific ticket office in 1888)

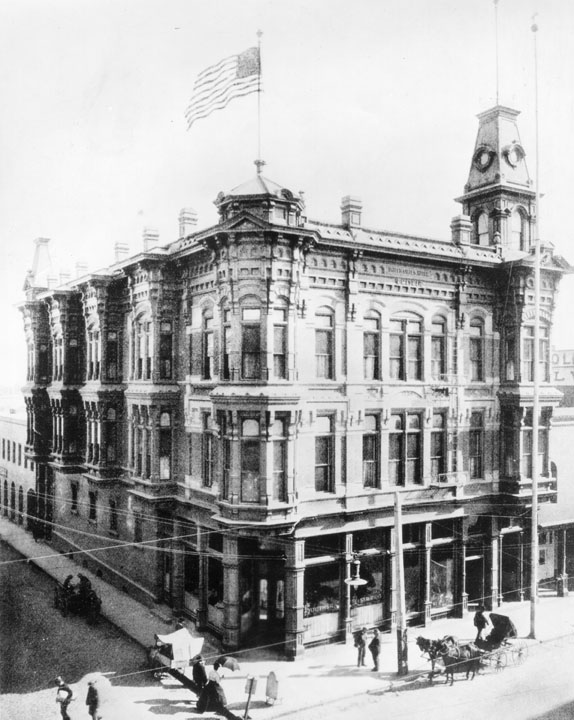
United States Hotel, SE corner Requena/Main. c. 1880

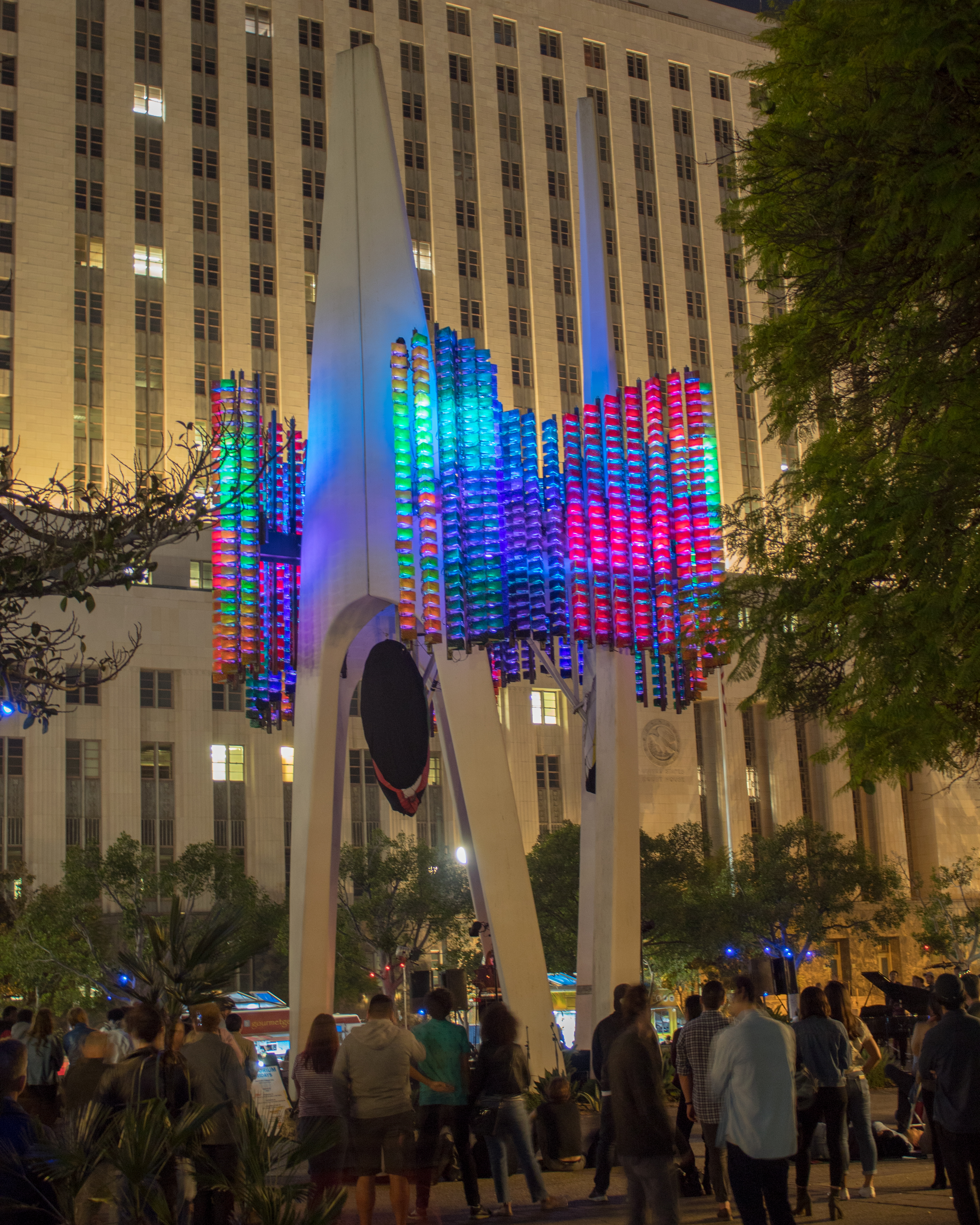
Triforium sculpture at the Los Angeles Mall just N of the NE corner of 1st/Temple, 2018.

Currently, this site is the southernmost end of the Los Angeles Mall; Triforium is approximately on the site of Commercial Street.

- #240 Farmers and Merchants Bank was located here in 1896
- #236 Los Angeles Savings Bank was located here in 1896
- #226-8 Commercial Bank, renamed First National Bank in 1880, was located here in 1896.First National Bank was located here in 1896.
- #214–222 (pre-1890 numbering: 74): New Lanfranco Block, built 1888, architects Curlett, Eisen & Cuthbertson Site of the Old Lanfranco Block, demolished in 1888.
- #200–202 (NE corner of Requena) Southern Pacific ticket office as of 1888-9
- #158–172: United States Hotel, southeast corner of Main and Requena St. (a.k.a. Market St.). Built 1861-2, demolished 1939. When built it was one of three hotels in the city, alongside the Bella Union and the Lafayette Hotel. It was ornate and Italianate in style, with a "profusion of brackets, corbel tables and oriel windows. On one end, a tower with a mansard roof lit by l'oeil de boeuf windows, poked up another story to signal the hotel's location to travelers.” Today, location of the south plaza of the Los Angeles Mall.

=== West side of Main from Temple south to First ===
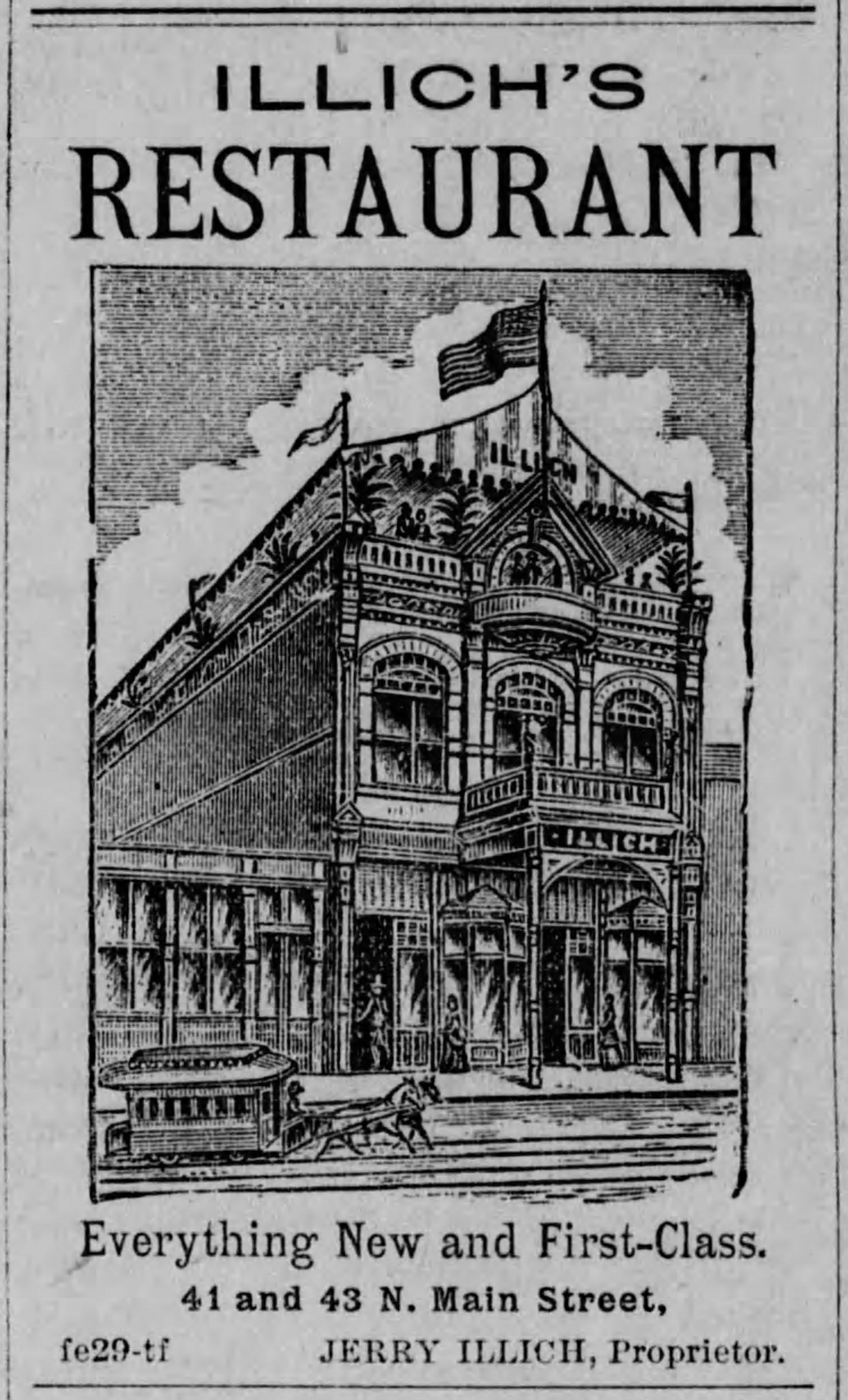
Illich's Restaurant ad from March 1890

This block is, since 1928, the site of Los Angeles City Hall

- Before 1926, Spring Street and Main Street met at Temple Street. From Temple, Main and Spring streets proceeded south; Spring at a more southwesterly angle. This created a narrow triangle with the triangle's northern point at Temple. Proceeding south along Main on the right-hand side one would pass the east side of Temple Block.
- Junction with Market Street
- Clock Tower Courthouse until demolished in 1895, or the Bullard Block built in its place after 1895.
- Junction with Court Street
- Illich's Restaurant and Oyster Parlors, 41–43 (pre-1890 numbering) 145–7 (post-1890) N. Main St.. Starting in the 1870s as a small chophouse, Illich's grew to be the largest restaurant in the city. Owner Jerry Illich was born in Dalmatia. He was connected with the Maison Doree restaurant at 4th and Main and later opened his own restaurant in 1896 on west 2nd Street between Broadway and Hill.
- Northwest corner of First and Main streets.

=== East side of Main from First to Second ===
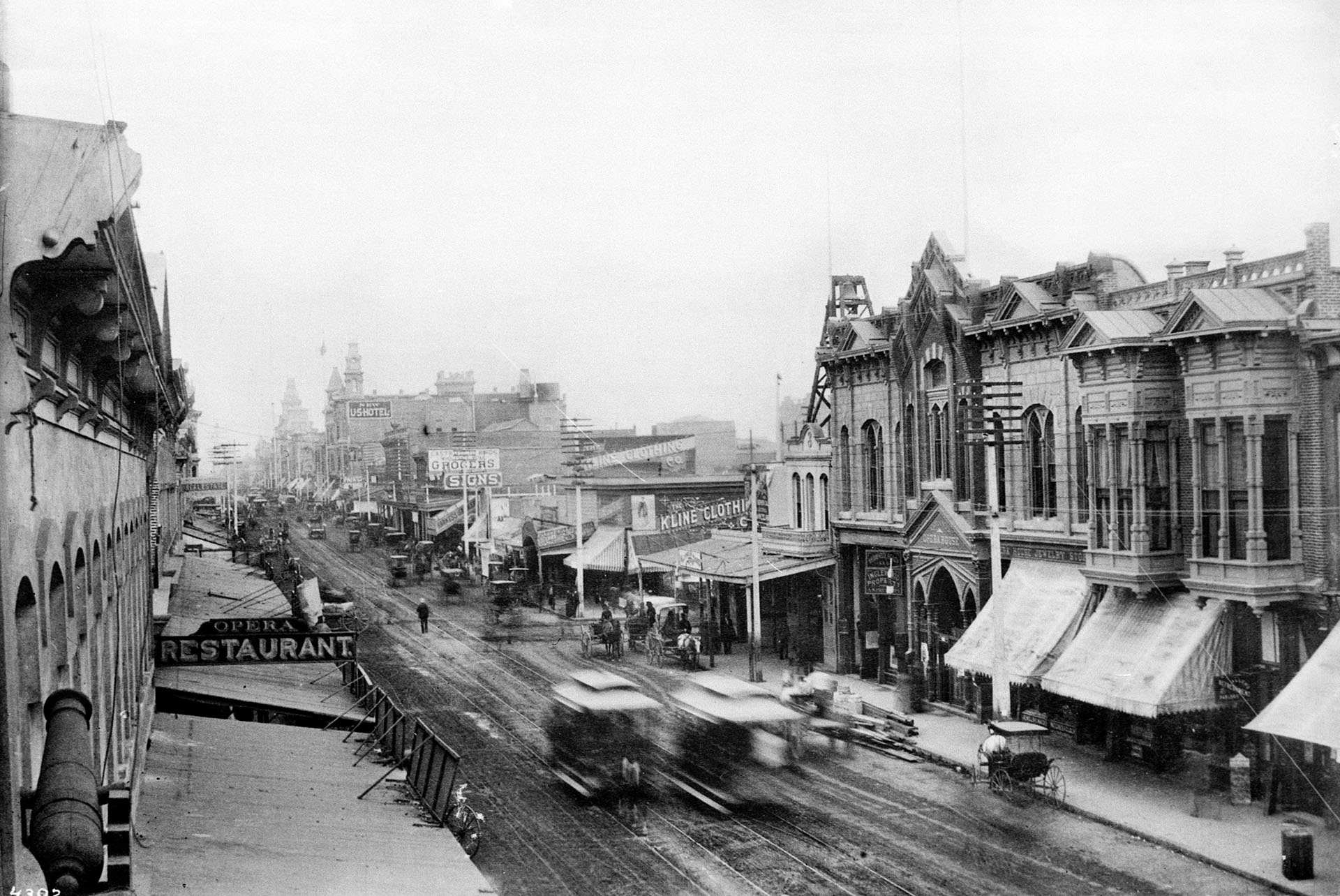
Two horsecars pass in a blur c. 1889. Looking north along Main from just south of 1st Street. Grand Opera House at right. Towers of the United States Hotel at back, behind which the towers of the Baker Block.

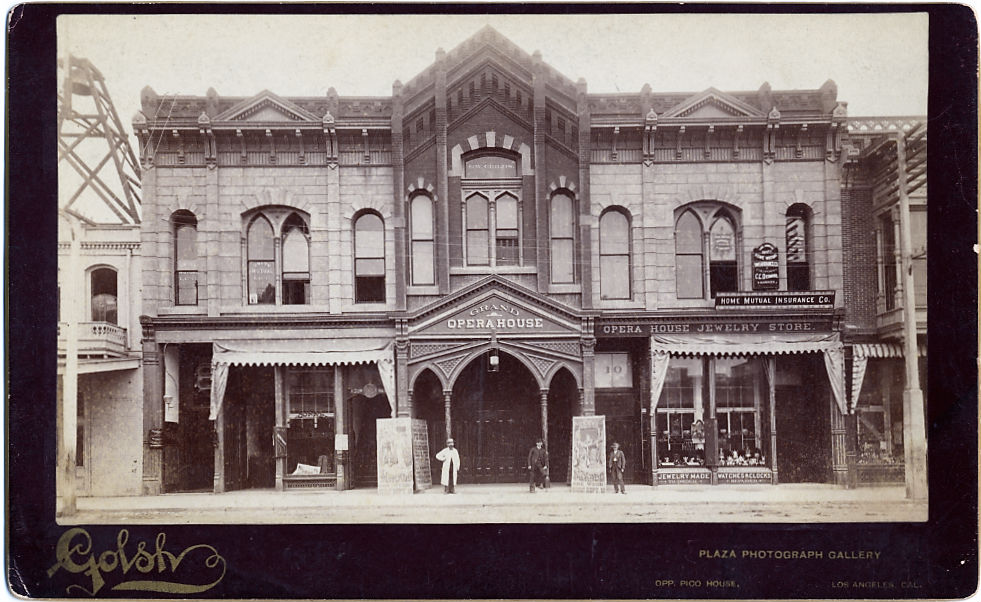
Grand Opera House, 110 S. Main, c. 1884–1893

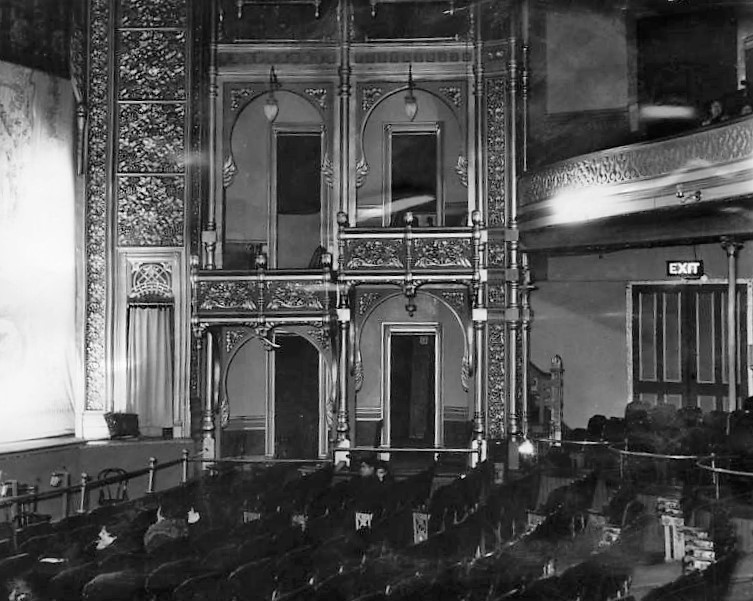
Orpheum Theatre when located at the Grand Opera House building, c. 1898

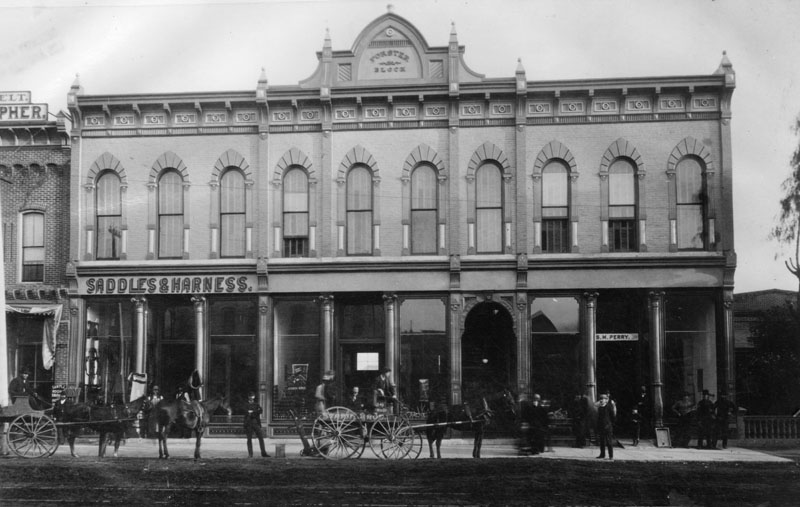
Forster Block
- Grand Opera House (1884, demolished 1936, capacity 1311, 110 S. Main, in later years known as the Orpheum (Dec. 1894–Sep. 1903), Clune's Grand (c. 1912), The Grand (c. 1920s), and Teatro México (1930s). (The Orpheum Circuit (circuit meaning "chain") moved the Orpheum name to a different venue in 1903 at 227 S. Spring, and again in 1911 to what is now the Palace Theatre). This theater was the site of the first commercial showing of motion pictures in the city. Demolished in 1936 to make way for a parking lot.
- Forster Block, 122–128 S. Main St. (post-1890 numbering), 22–28 S. Main St. (per-1890 numbering), was a two-story building built in the early 1880s, five doors south of the Grand Opera House. It housed a coffee house of the Women's Christian Temperance Union at #26, heavily damaged in an 1885 fire, and a saddlery.

=== Third from Spring to Main, Third and Main ===
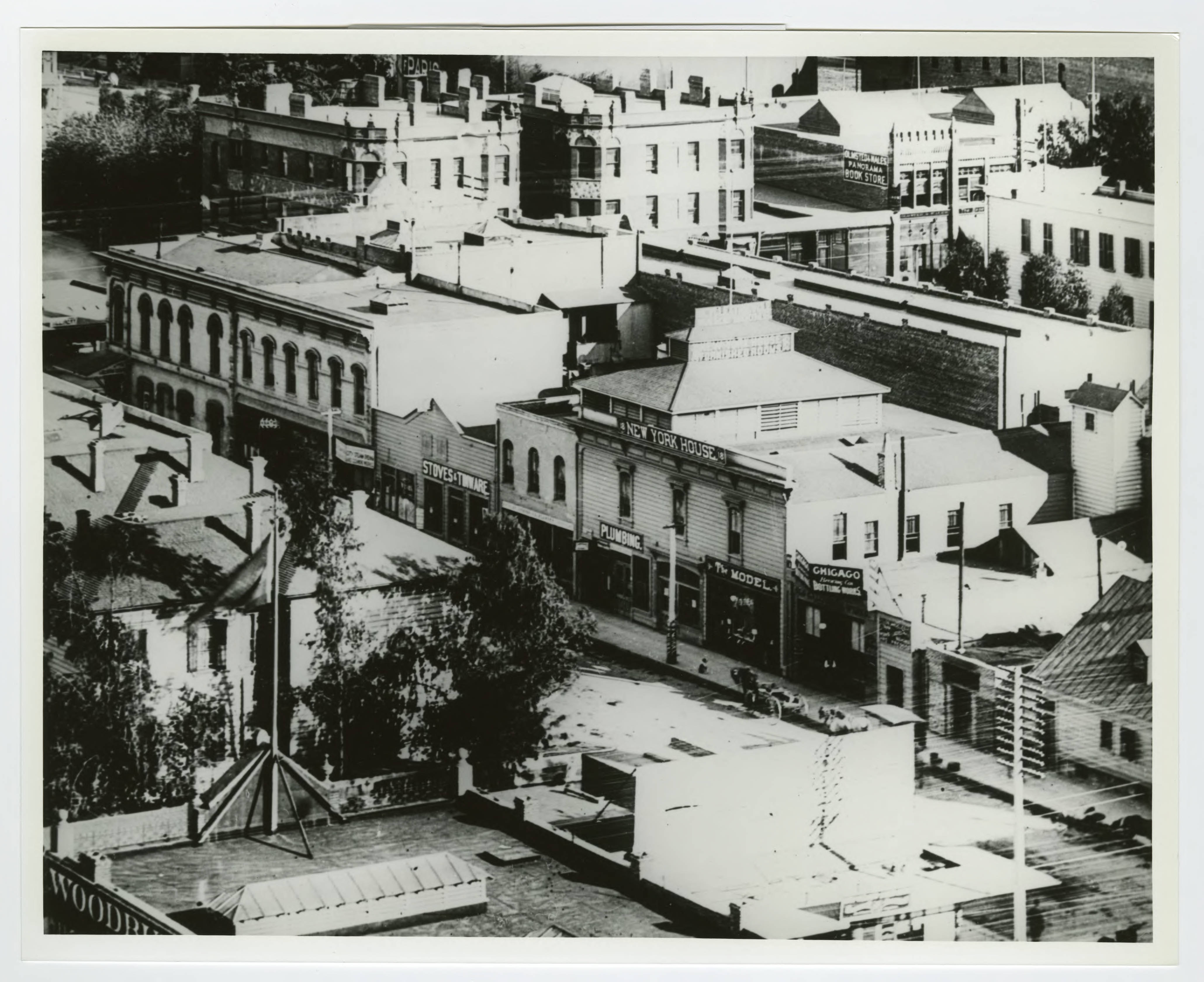
c. 1887 view looking east along south side of 3rd Street incl. former New York Brewery, towards Main (across top). Back left: The Thom Block. Back right: Olmsted & Wales bookstore in the Panorama Building.

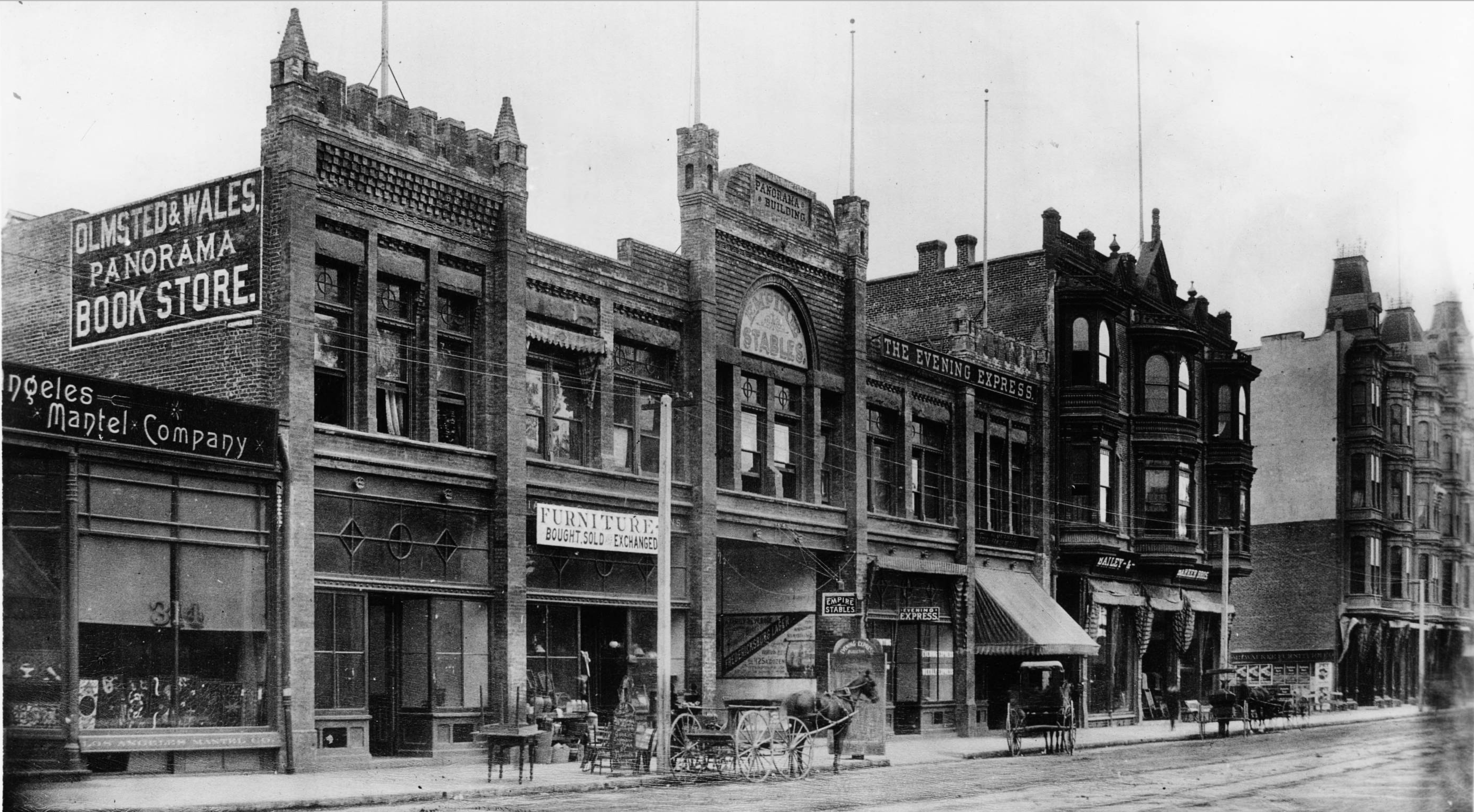
Panorama Building, E side of Main between Mayo (3rd) and 4th, c. 1890. The center entrance led through to the panorama exhibition space in the back. Note the Olmsted & Wales Panorama Bookstore, and the offices of the Evening Express. At right, the Hotel Westminster at the NE corner of 4th/Main.

On the corner of Third and Main:

- Wells Fargo and Co. offices, northwest corner of 3rd/Main as of 1894
- The Thom Block, southeast corner of Mayo/Third and Main as of 1894
- Schwartz Block and Jackson House, southwest corner of 3rd/Main as of 1894

=== Buildings and sites south of Third Street ===
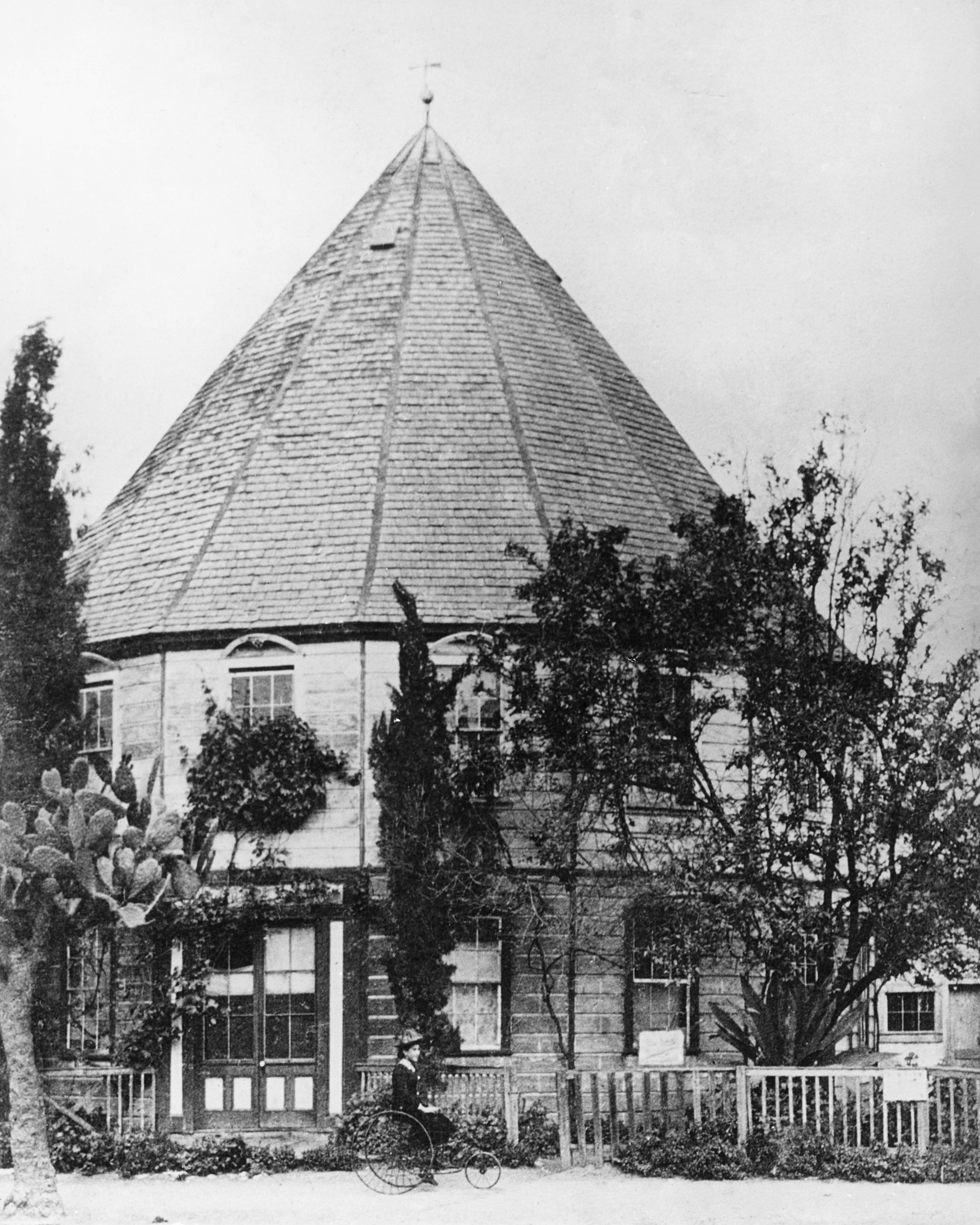
Round House, west side of Main south of 3rd, c. 1880-1885

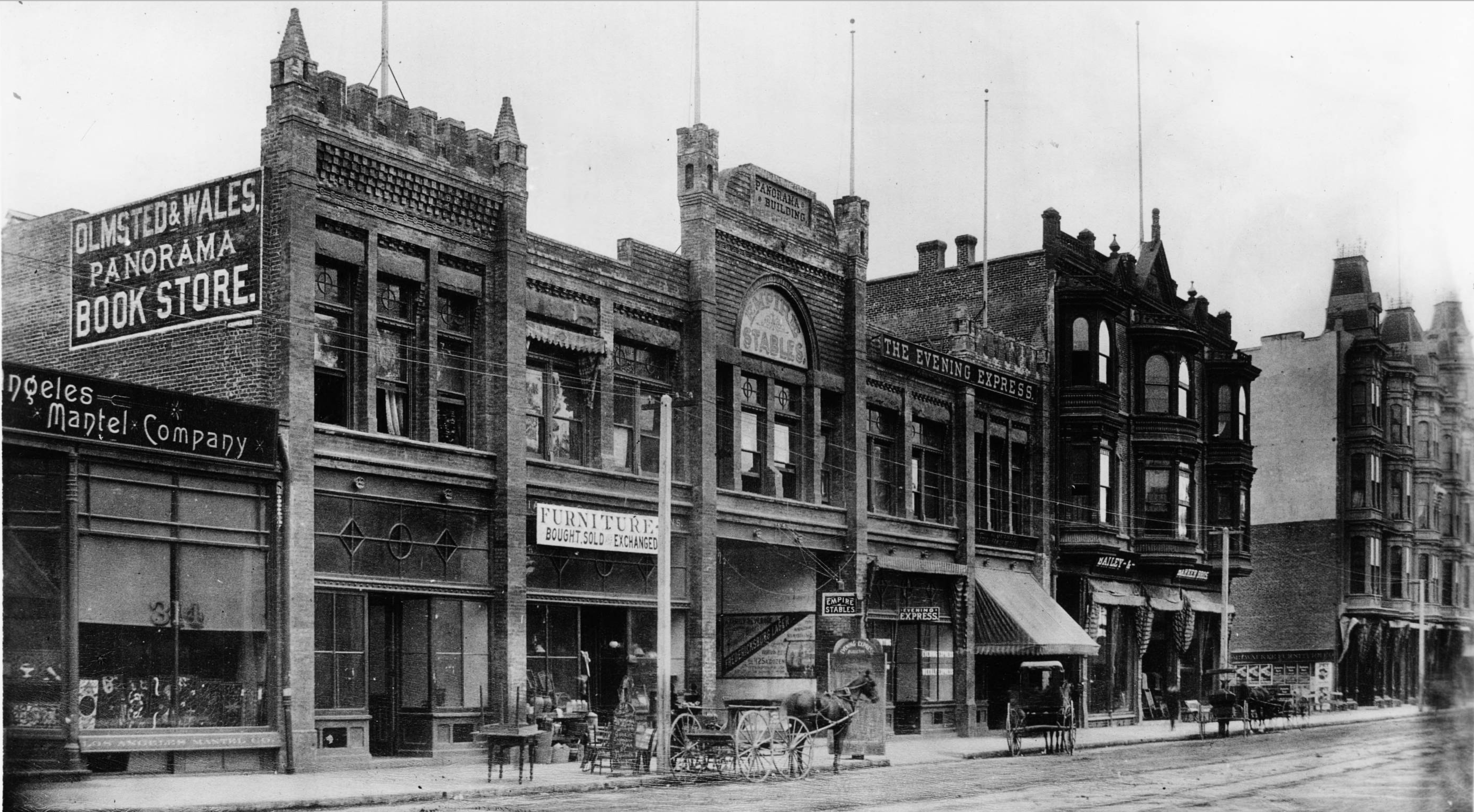
Panorama Building, E side of Main between Mayo (3rd) and 4th, c. 1890. The center entrance led through to the panorama exhibition space in the back. Note the Olmsted & Wales Panorama Bookstore, and the offices of the Evening Express. At right, the Hotel Westminster at the NE corner of 4th/Main.

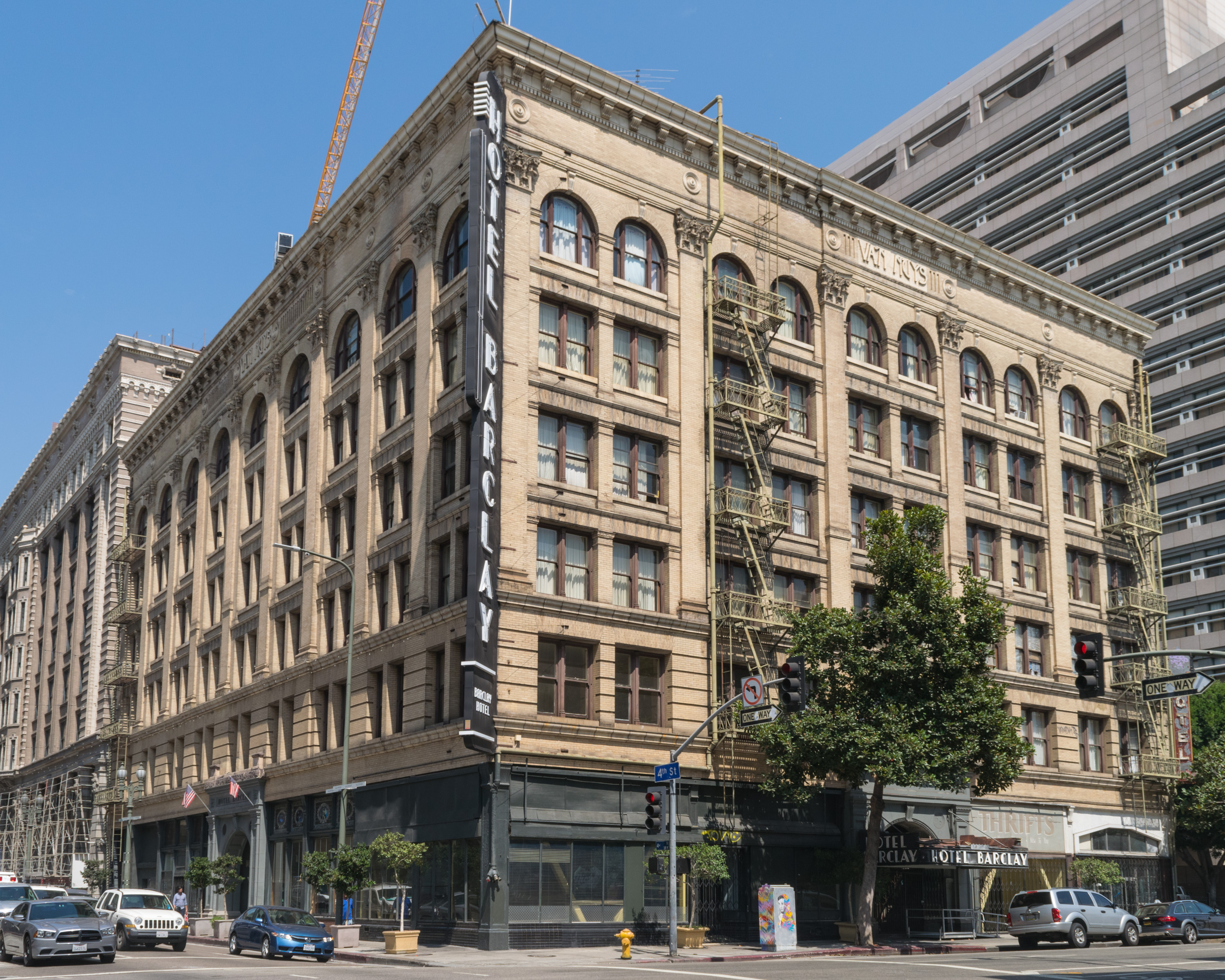
Hotel Barclay, NW corner 4th/Main

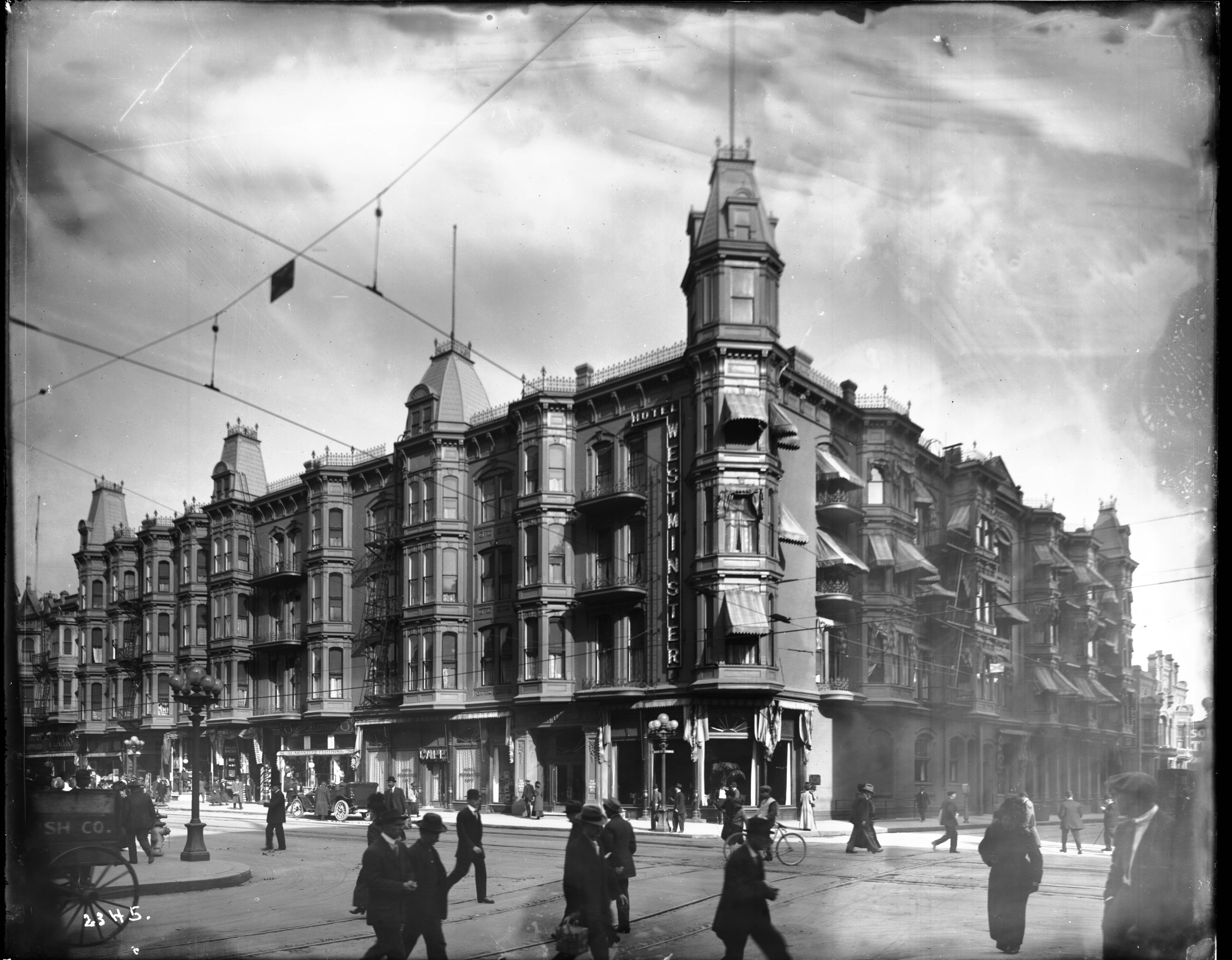
Hotel Westminster (demolished), NE corner 4th/Main, c. 1900

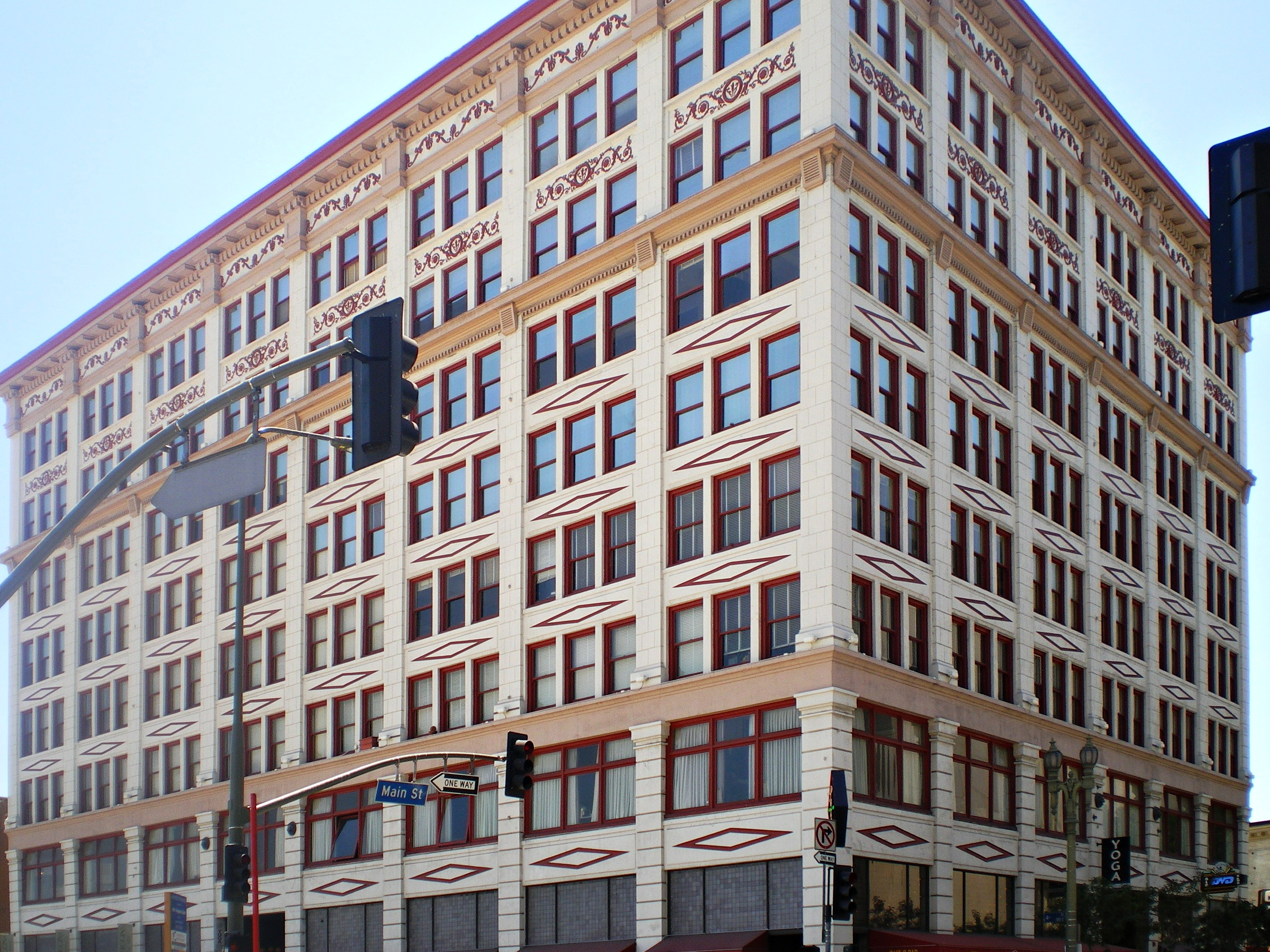
The San Fernando Building, SE corner 4th/Main, 2008

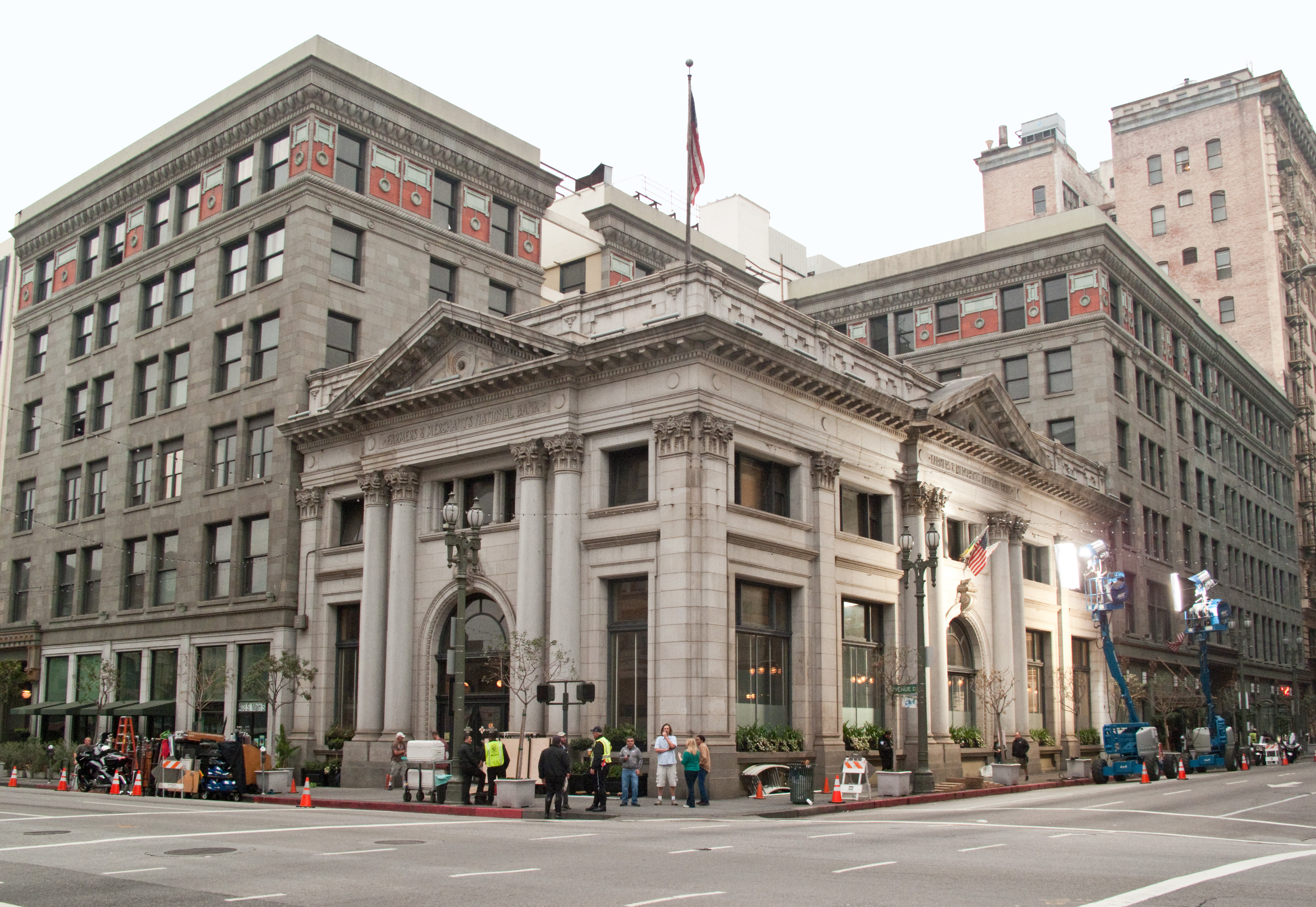
Isaias W. Hellman Office Building, 411 S. Main, 2013

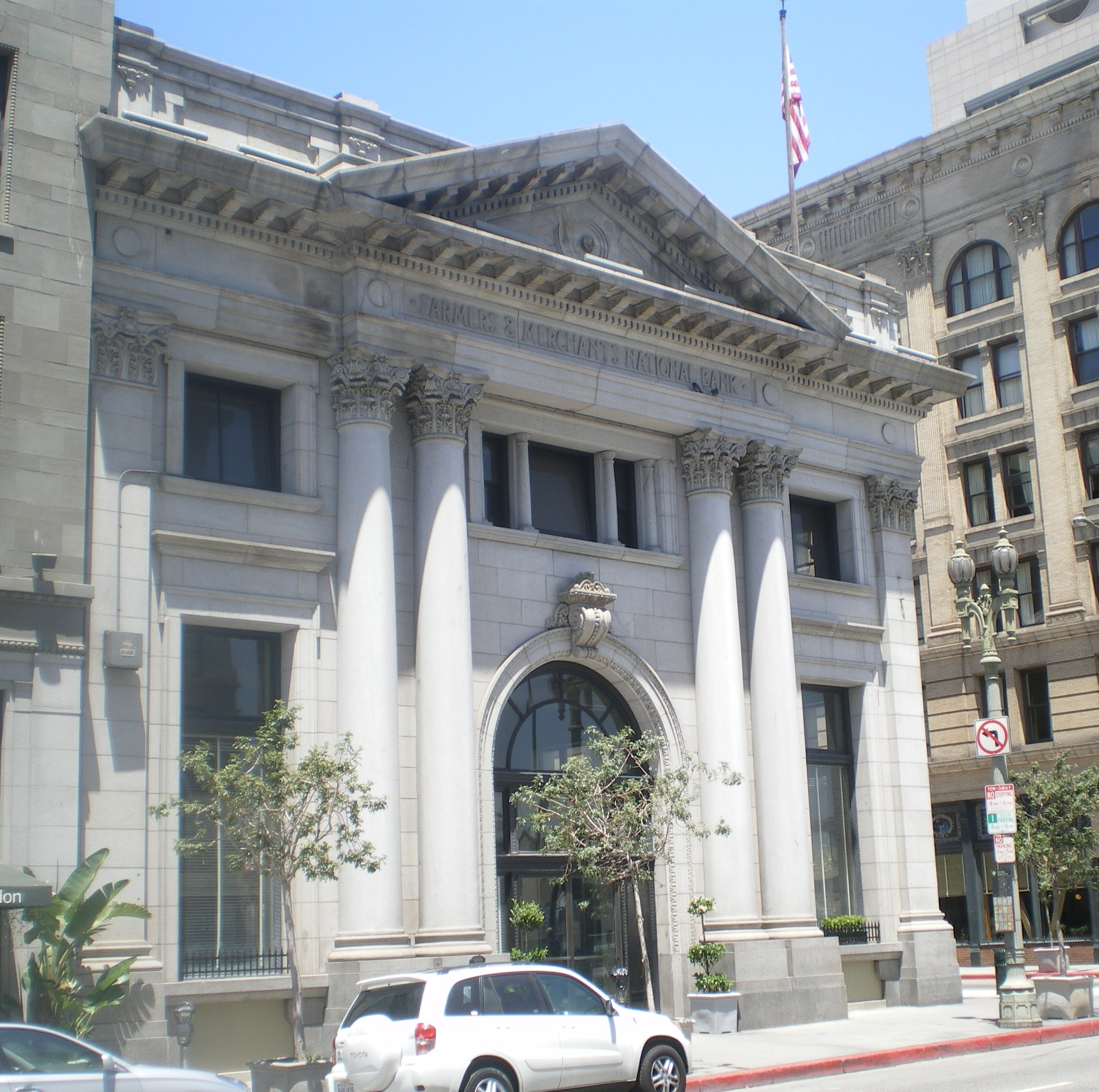
Farmers & Merchants Bank Building, SW corner 4th/Main, 2008

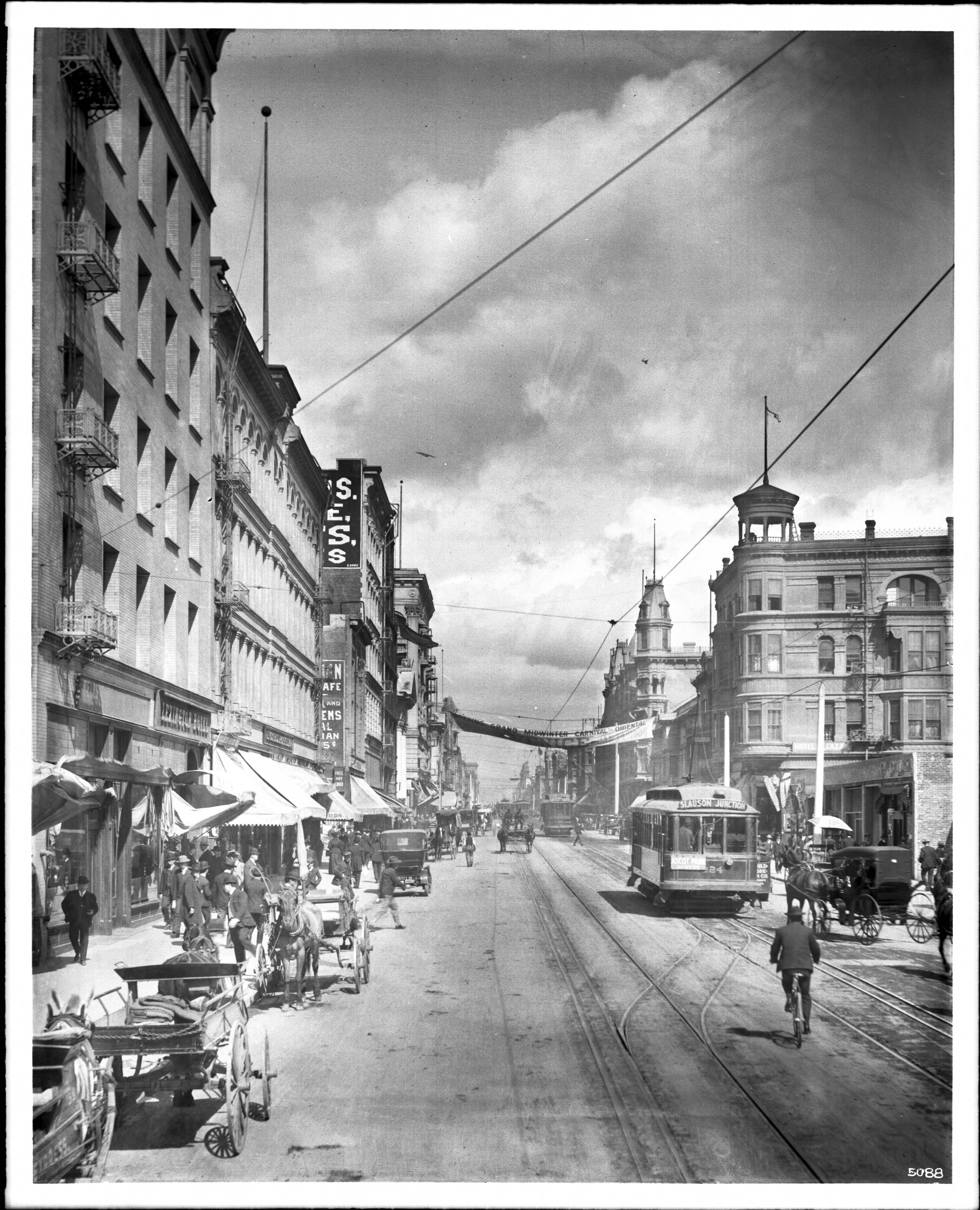
c. 1904, 400 block of Main looking north from 5th St. Lexington Hotel (now demolished) at #443 left; turreted Hotel Westminster, back right. Main Street Savings Bank Building at #426 (right foreground, round roof turret).

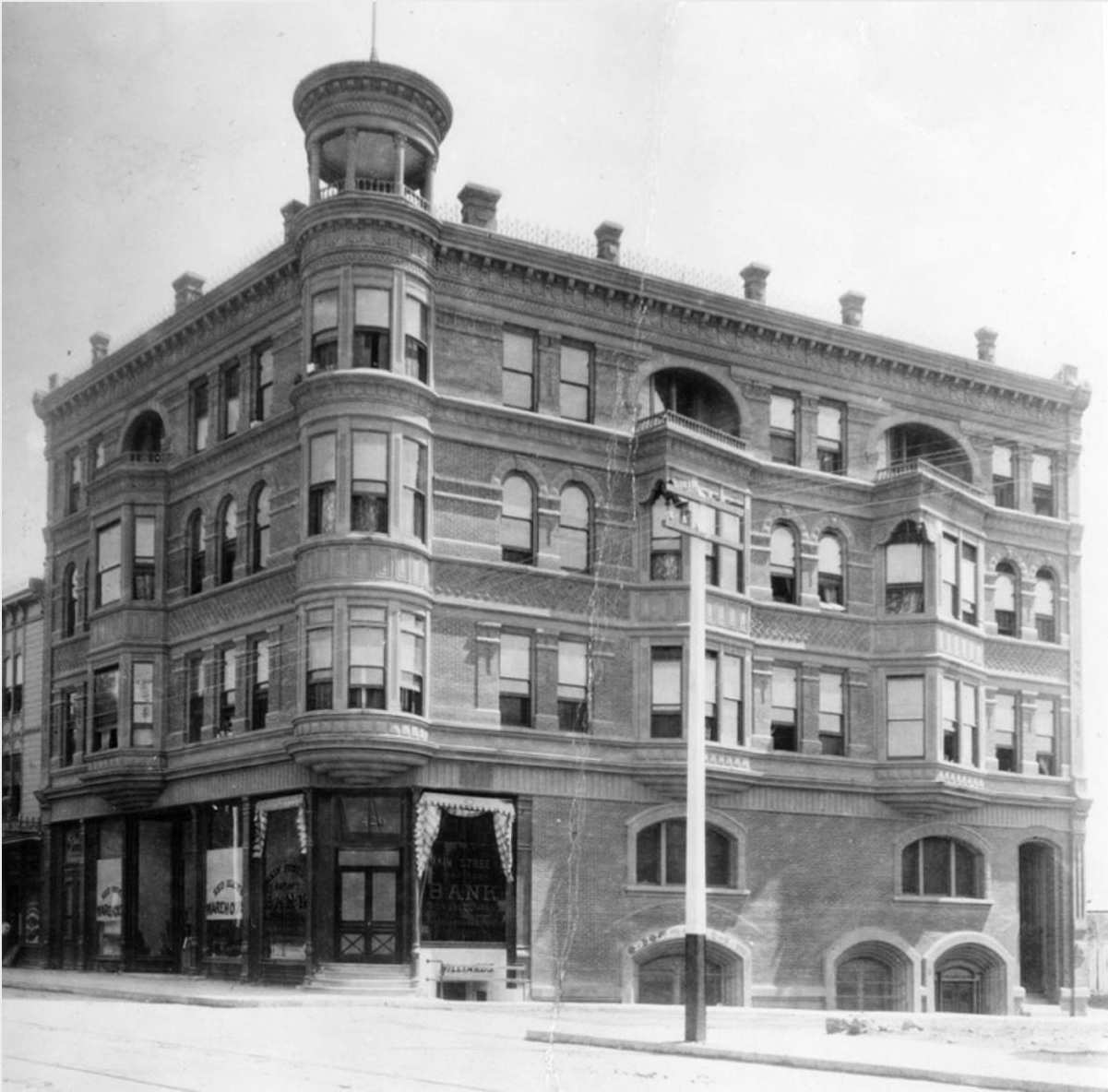
Main Street Savings Bank Building in the 1890s. NE corner of Winston. Demolished.

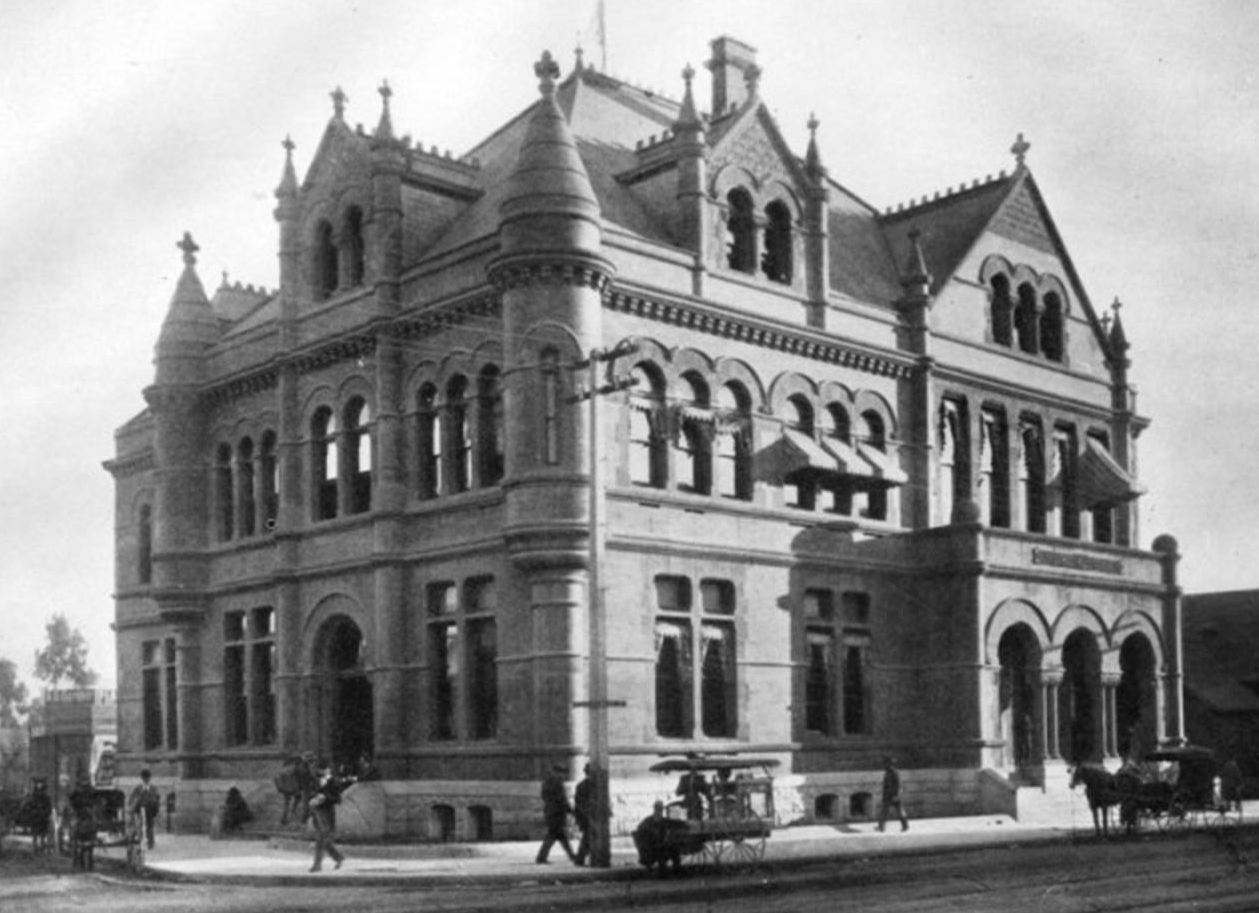
U.S. Government Building including Post Office, 1893. SE corner of Winston. Demolished.

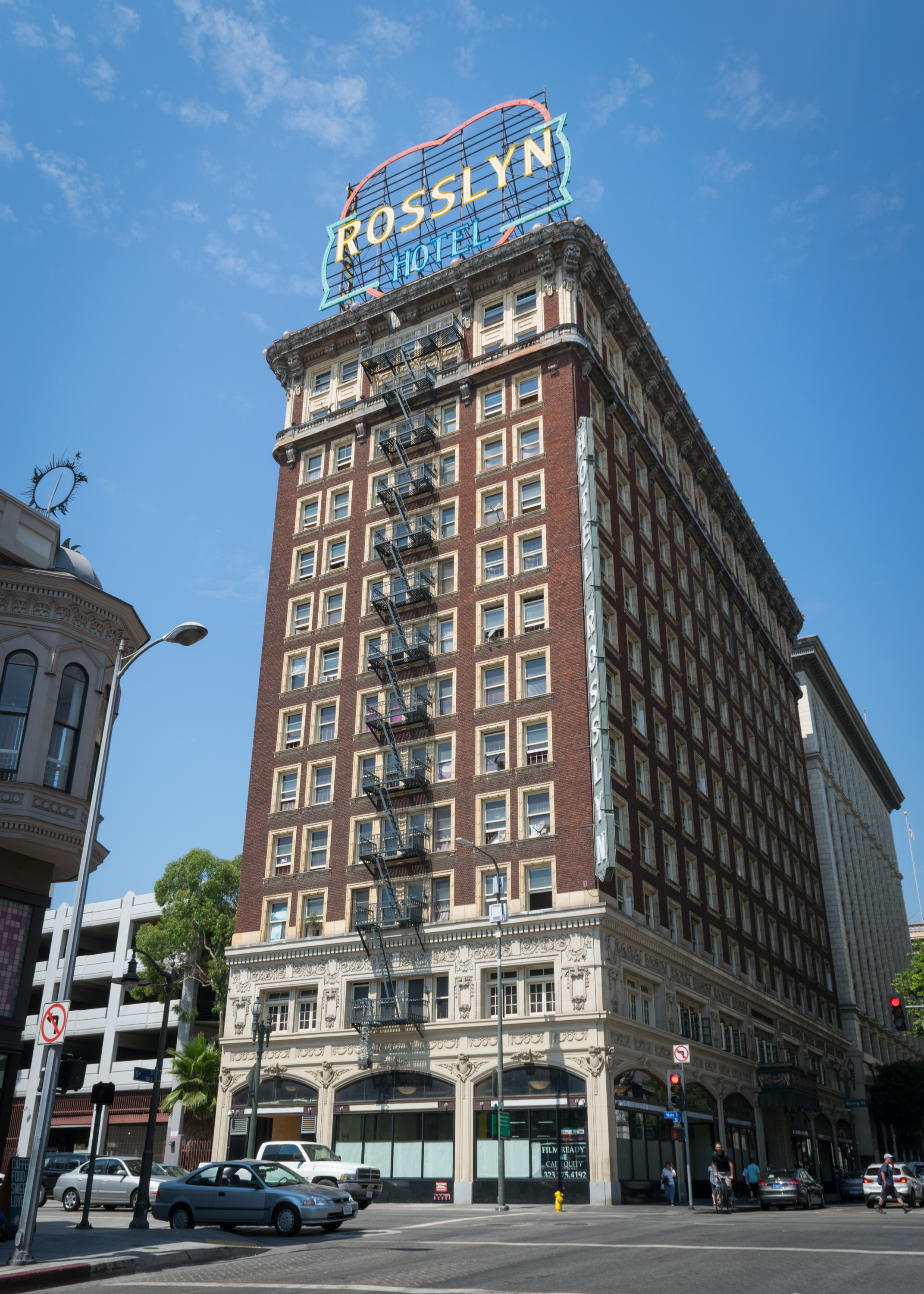
Hotel Rosslyn Annex, SW corner 5th/Main, 2017

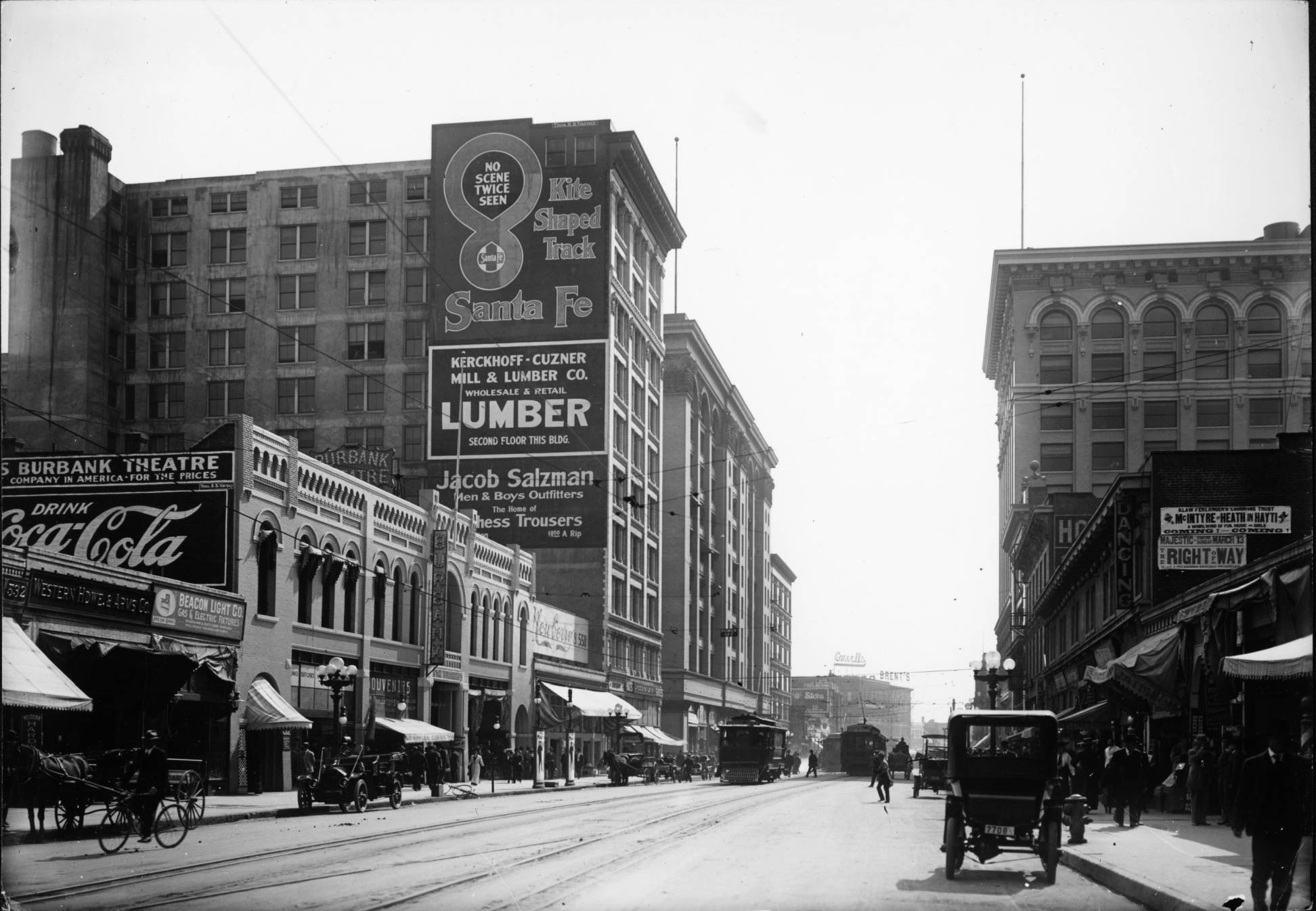
500 block of Main south from 5th, c. 1908. Burbank Theatre at #546 at left

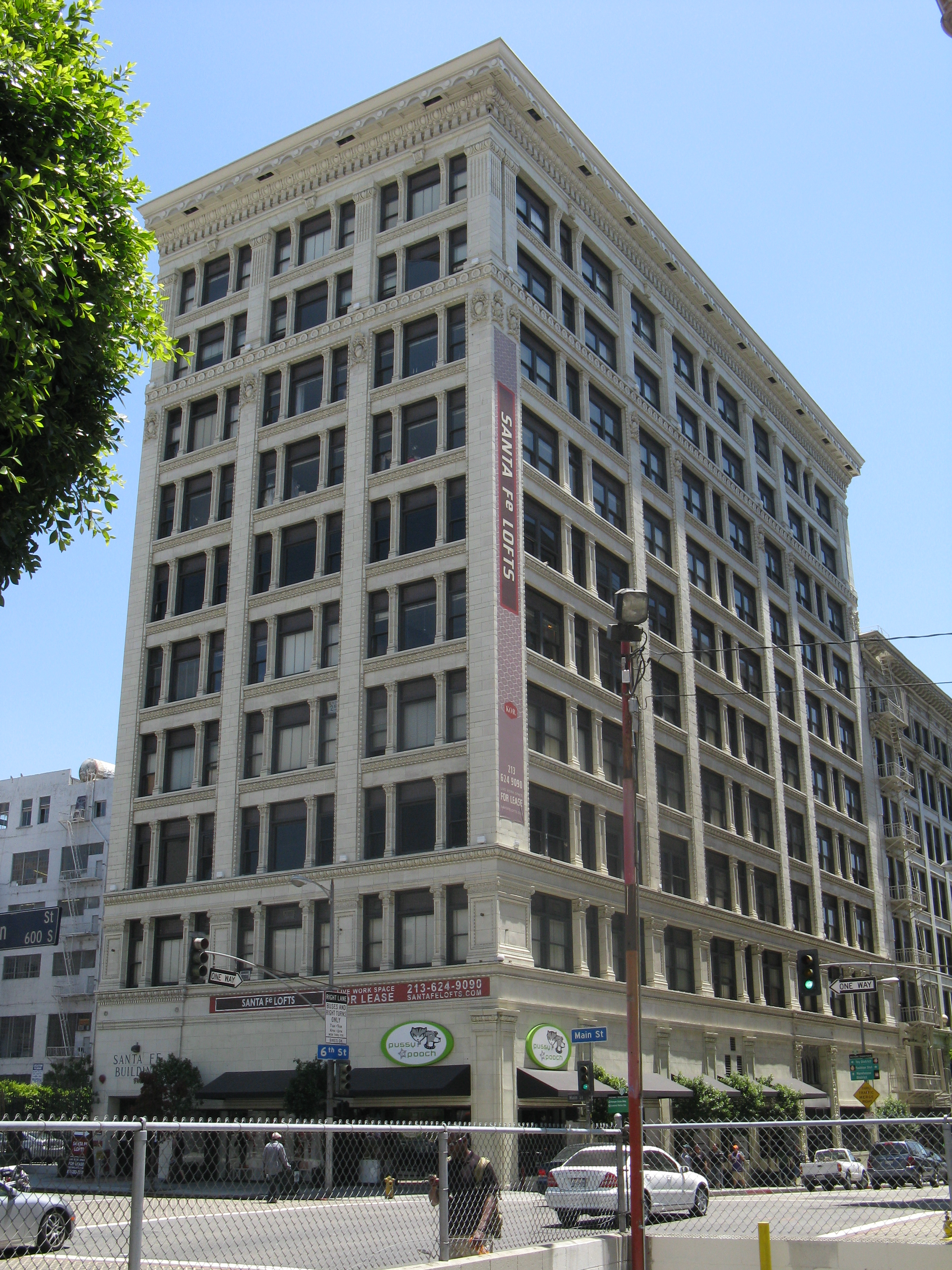
Kerckoff Building, 558–564 S. Main

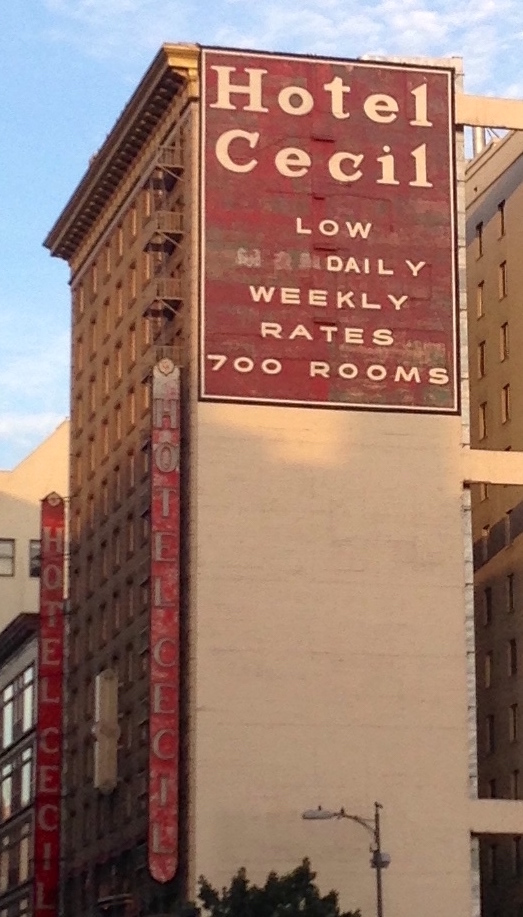
Hotel Cecil, 640 S. Main

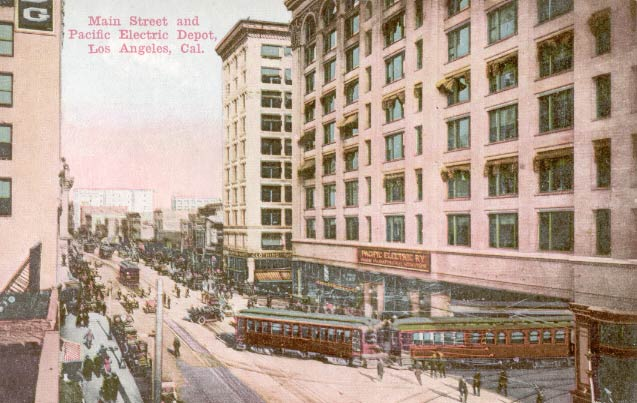
View north on Main from south of 6th, c. 1910, Pacific Electric Building at right.

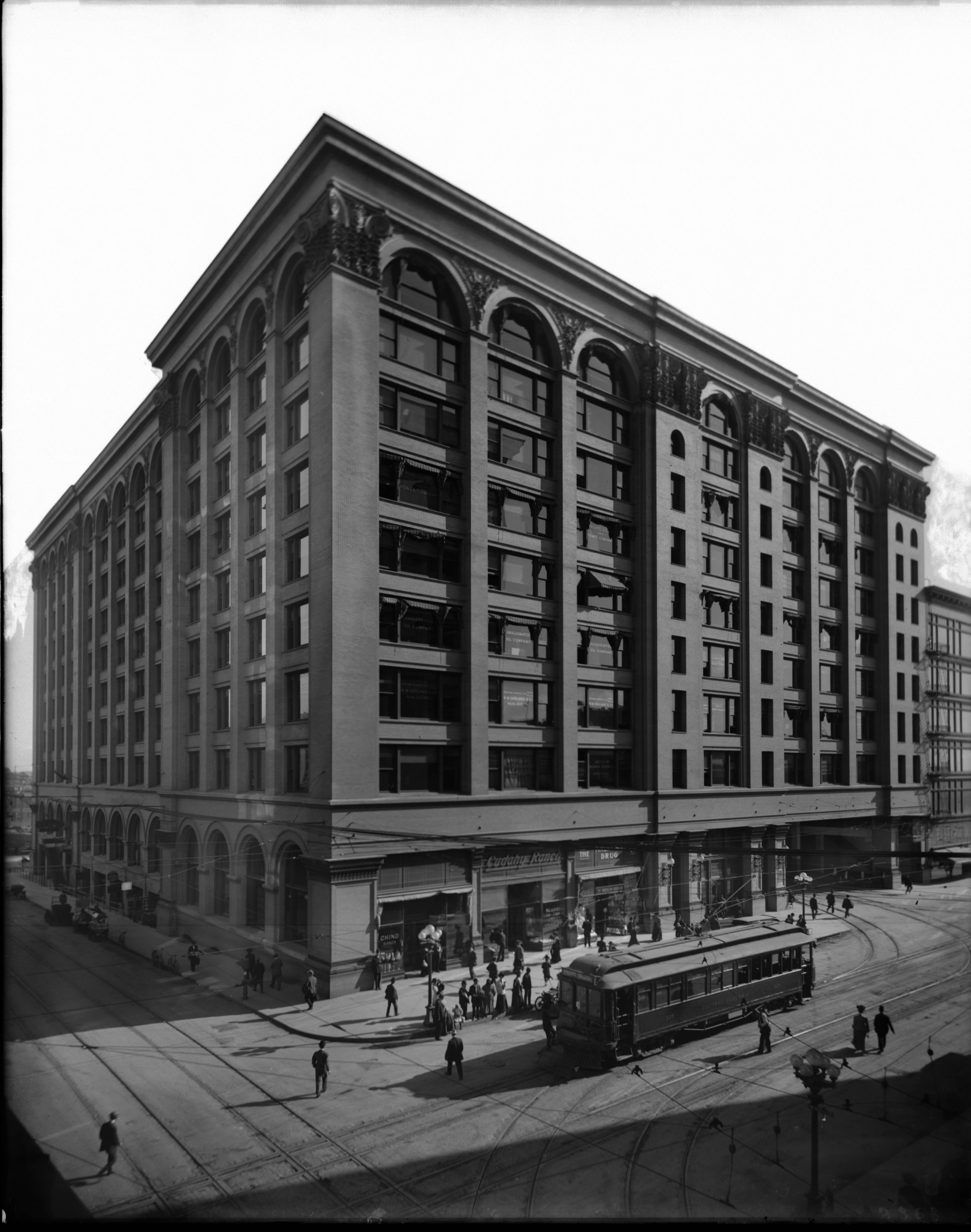
Pacific Electric station at 6th and Main, c. 1905-1909

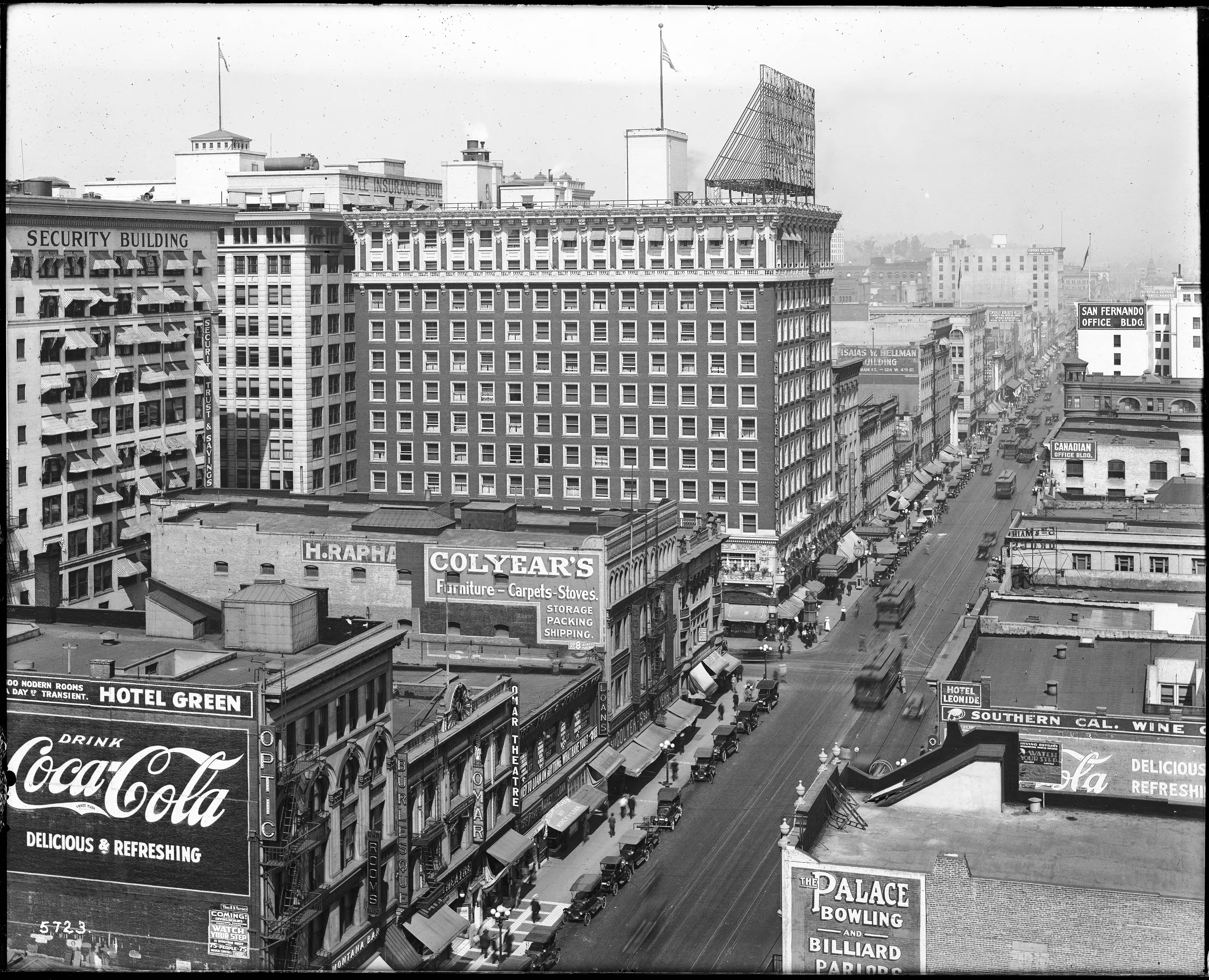
Looking north on Main from 6th c. 1917. Tall building is the Hotel Rosslyn main building. Visible: sign for Isaias W. Hellman Bldg. at 124 W. 4th; Wesley Roberts, Higgins, San Fernando and Canadian buildings. Colyear's sign is site of Hotel Rosslyn Annex.

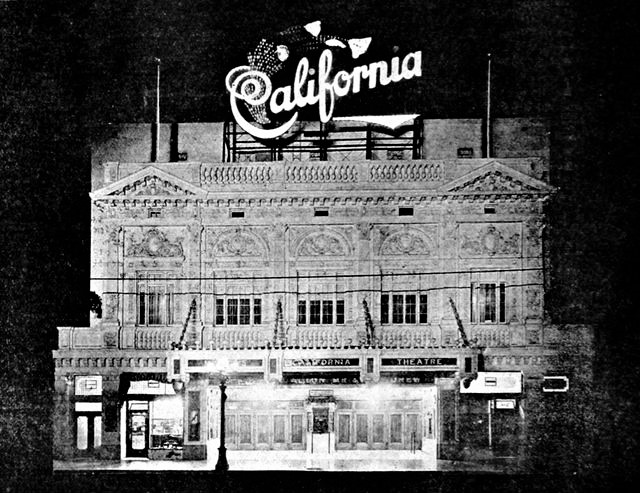
California Theatre, 810 S. Main St., Los Angeles, c. 1921

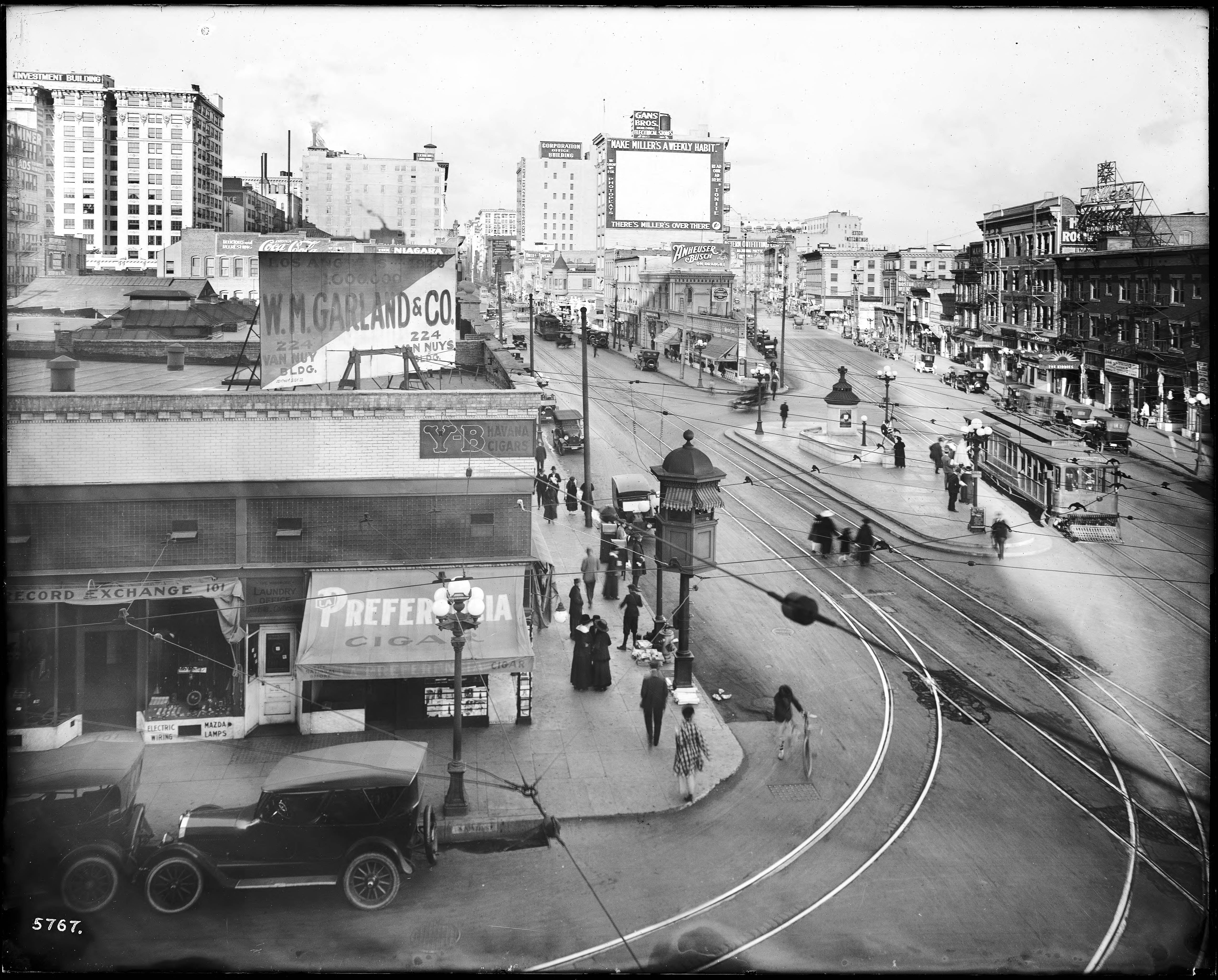
9th at Main and Spring, looking north, c. 1917. The Miller Theatre (1913) and Hotel Huntington are among the buildings in view.

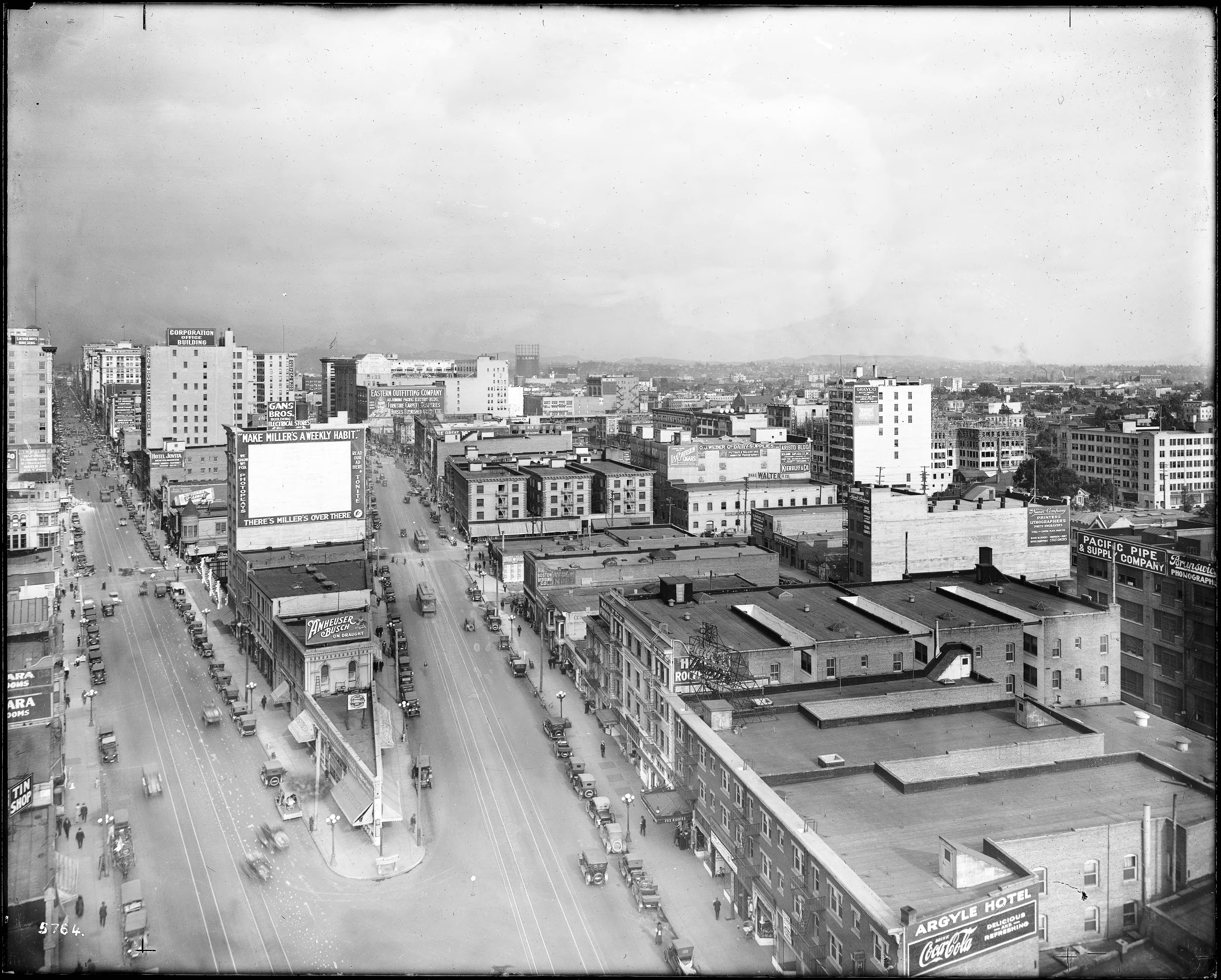
9th at Main and Spring, looking north, c. 1917

Sources include the Clason map of Downtown Los Angeles:

==== 300 block ====
On the west side of Main St. south of 3rd Street were:

- #311–317 - Round House (demolished)
- 300 block west side - site of Belasco Theatre

On the east side of Main St. south of 3rd Street were:

- Panorama Building, 312–324 S. Main (post-1890 numbering), with retail shops and offices such as the Olmsted & Wales Panorama bookstore and the Los Angeles Evening Express offices. In the center of the building was a passage to the back and an exhibition space for a panoramic painting, debuting in late 1887: a copy of the Panorama of the Siege of Paris by Henri Felix Emmanuel Philippoteaux, depicting a battle of the 1870-71 Franco-Prussian War—the last one between the French resistance and Prussian besiegers, which led to the fall of Paris in January, 1871. When attendance dwindled, investors (including local landowner and capitalist Daniel Freeman) sold the painting to buyers in San Francisco and the rotunda housed at various times the Empire Stables and "Panorama Stables', with stalls for horses in the former exhibition space., in 1906 it was transformed into a state-of-the-art roller skating rink, which was unsuccessful. Owner Adolph Ramish demolished the building in 1907 and the Adolphus (later Hippodrome) Theatre was built on the site. Today the site is a large open-air parking lot.
- Hotel Westminster at the end of the block, 342 S. Main St., northeast corner of 4th and Main. Robert Brown Young, architect. Opened 1888, demolished 1960. Now the Medallion Apartments, opened 2010.

==== 4th and Main ====
- NW corner 4th/Main - Hotel Barclay
- NE corner 4th Main - site of Hotel Westminster, now site of Medallion Apartments
- #400–410 (SE corner of 4th/Main) - San Fernando Building
- #401 (SW corner of 4th/Main) - Farmers and Merchants Bank of Los Angeles building (former)
- #403–411 S. Main, entrance also on 124 W. 4th, Isaias W. Hellman Office Building (1912-5, Morgan, Walls and Morgan). Not to be confused with the Hellman Building on Spring Street nearby.
- #420–426 (NE corner of Winston): site of Main Street Savings Bank Building, demolished
- #430 (SE corner of Winston, approximate numbering): Federal Building or Government Building, demolished. The Post Office moved here in June 1893 from 6th and Broadway.
- #443: site of Lexington Hotel

==== 5th and Main ====
- NW corner 5th/Main - former Rosslyn Hotel main building, now The Rosslyn lofts
- 112 W. 5th (SW corner 5th/Main) Hotel Rosslyn Annex
- SE corner 5th/Main former Charnock Block a.k.a. Pershing Hotel and Roma Hotel (508 S. Main), now New Pershing Apartments, last original two-story 19th-century commercial block left in the Historic Core. The Charnock Block was constructed in two phases, the 5th St. face in 1889 and the Main St. face in 1907. In 1923, it became the Pershing Hotel. It is a rare example of Late Victorian-era commercial architecture and Second Empire architecture still existing in the Historic Core. The Roma was built in 1904 by Fred L. and Frank M. Lee. In 1989, both buildings were joined and renovated and are now apartments; they are contributing buildings to the "5th-Main Street Commercial Historic District", National Register of Historic Places (eligible 2007).
- Burbank Theatre, 548 S. Main, opened 1893, closed 1974, demolished. Now the site of the Topaz Apartments at #550.

==== 6th and Main ====
- NW corner 6th/Main - site of Severance Building
- NE corner of 6th/Main, #558–564, Santa Fe Lofts also known as the Kerckoff Building, built 1908, former offices of the Atchison, Topeka and Santa Fe Railroad
- SW corner 6th/Main, site of Central Building
- SE corner 6th/Main, #610, Pacific Electric Building, former main station for interurban streetcars of the Pacific Electric Railway
- #640 Hotel Cecil, 14 stories

==== 7th and Main ====
- #700 Former Dearden's department store building, under renovation
- 7th to Washington: L.A. Fashion District

==== 8th and Main ====
- NW corner 8th/Main, Great Republic Building, now Great Republic lofts (entrance on Spring Street)
- NE corner 8th/Main Hotel Huntington Building, now Huntington Apartments
- SW corner 8th/Main, National City Building, now National City Tower lofts
- #810, site of California Theatre (opened 1918, closed 1987, demolished 1990) and
- #842 site of the Miller Theatre (opened 1913, originally 714 seats, later 924, demolished)

==== 9th and Main ====
- NW corner of 9th/Main, W. M. Garland Building
- SW corner of 9th/Main Marsh & Strong Building

=== Theaters on Main Street ===
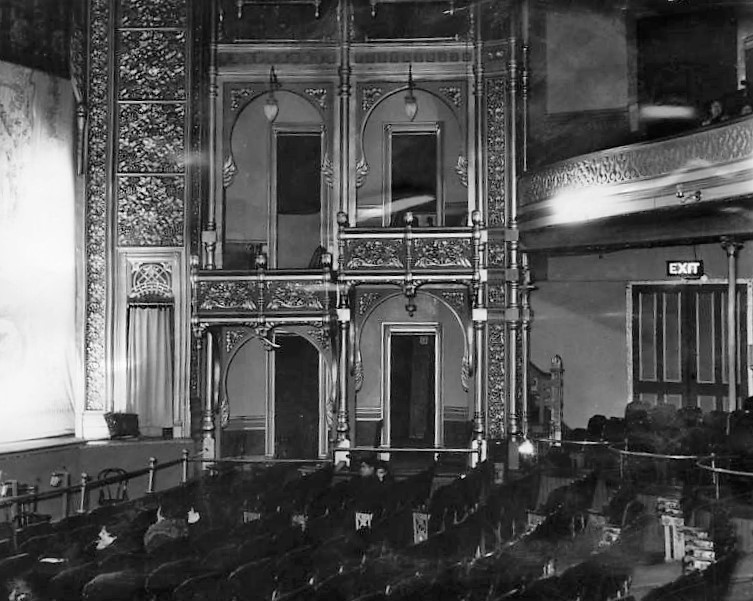
Orpheum Theatre when located at the Grand Opera House building, c. 1898

While the Broadway Theater and Commercial District several blocks west is famous enough to warrant constituting a National Register-listed historic district, Main Street was home to dozens of theatres and early cinemas as well. The peak era was the early 1910s, before the more upscale cinema market migrated west to Broadway. There were 27 theaters and cinemas running on Main in 1912. In 1939 there were still 18 operating between 2nd and 9th streets.

- Art Theatre, 551 S. Main St.
- Banner Theatre, 458 S. Main St.
- Bijou Theatre, 553 S. Main St.
- Burbank Theatre, 548 S. Main St.
- California Theatre, 810 S. Main St.
- Clune's Theatre, 453 S. Main St.
- Crystal Theatre, 247 S. Main St.
- Denver Theatre, 238 S. Main St.
- Dohs Theatre, 166 N. Main St.
- The Downtown Independent, 251 S. Main St.
- Tally's Electric Theater, 262 S. Main St.
- Estella Theatre, 515 N. Main St.
- Federal Theatre, 300 N. Main St.
- Follies Theater, 337 S. Main St.
- Galway Theatre, 514 S. Main St.
- Gayety Theatre, 523 S. Main St.
- Gem Theatre, 649 S. Main St.
- Grand Opera House, 110 S. Main St. (a.k.a. Orpheum Theatre, which changed venues over the years)
- Happy Hour Theatre, 125 S. Main St.
- Hippodrome Theatre, 320 S. Main St.
- Hollander Theatre, 115 E. 1st St.
- Jade Theatre, 315 S. Main St.
- Lark Theatre, 613 S. Main St.
- Liberty Theatre, 266 S. Main St.
- Linda Lea Theatre, 251 S. Main St.
- Main Theatre, 438 S. Main St.
- Merced Theatre, 420 N. Main St.
- Miller's Theatre, 842 S. Main St.
- Mott's Hall, 133 S. Main St.
- Muse Theatre, 417 S. Main St.
- Nickel Theatre, 255 S. Main St.
- Novelty Theatre, 136 S. Main St.
- Olvera St. Theatre, W-10 Olvera St. / 620 N. Main St.
- Optic Theatre, 533 S. Main St.
- People's Amphitheater, N. Main St. near 1st
- Picture Theatre, 545 S. Main St.
- Playo Theatre, 349 N. Main St.
- Plaza Theatre, 224 N. Main St.
- Princess Theatre, 121 W. 1st St.
- Principal Theatre, 433 N. Main St.
- Regal Theatre, 323 S. Main St.
- Regent Theatre, 448 S. Main St.
- Republic Theatre, 629 1/2 S. Main St.
- Rex Theatre, 324 S. Main St.
- Roosevelt Theatre, 212 N. Main St.
- Rosslyn Theatre, 431 S. Main St.
- Rounder Theatre, 510 S. Main St.
- Sherman Theatre, 518 S. Main St.
- Star Theatre, 529 S. Main St.
- Star Theatre, 100 block of E. 5th St.
- Stearns Hall, SE corner N. Main St. and Arcadia St.
- Tally's Phonograph and Vitascope Parlor, 137 S. Main St.
- Teatro Hidalgo, 373 N. Main St.
- Teatro Torito, W-12 Olvera St. / 622 N. Main St.
- Temple Theatre, 155 N. Main St.
- Victor Theatre, 1718 S. Main St.
- Wood's Opera House, 410 N. Main St.

=== First 2 official Apothecaries on Main Street ===
The first 2 official Pharmaceutical doctors in Los Angeles, arriving in 1860/61. Both being German immigrants, were Theodore Wollweber at Main St. / Hall at 59 and Adolph Junge at 99 Main Street. Junge was located at this address from 1861 until his passing in 1878, whereafter his son Ramon Junge continued the practice as his successor until ca. 1880.

- Wollweber, drugs and medicine, Main St. / Hall at 59
- Junge, drugs and medicine, 99 N. Main St.

=== Architecture map ===
Landmarks are shown on the following street grid of the Historic Core of Downtown Los Angeles.

Abbreviations

B.	Building
Ctr	Center
Dept Store, DS, ds	department store
H.	Hotel
HCM	L.A. Historic-Cultural Monument
🅿️	parking (lot or structure)
🏠	residential use
ret	retail
Th.	Theater/Theatre
T&SB	Trust and Savings Bank

Text, colors etc.

Blue	Banks
Brown	Residential apts./condos
Gold	Jewelry marts/shops
Green	Retail (except jewelry)
Orange	Hotels
Purple	Theaters, cinemas
Non-italic text	Current building name or tenant
Italic text	Demolished or previous name/tenant

Architectural styles

AD	Art Deco
BA	Beaux-Arts
BR	Baroque Revival
Chur	California Churrigueresque
CR	Classical Revival
GR	Gothic Revival
IRR	Italian Renaissance Revival
It	Italianate
NC	Neoclassical
Nov	Novelty architecture
Rom	Romanesque
RR	Renaissance Revival
SE	Second Empire
SG	Spanish Gothic
Vic	Victorian

Architects

AR	Alfred Rosenheim
ACM	Albert C. Martin, Sr.
BMP	B. Marcus Priteca
C&B	Curlett & Beelman
CB	Claud Beelman
CHB	Carroll Herkimer Brown
CHC	C. Howard Crane
D&F	Dennis & Farwell
EPC	Eli P. Clark
EM	Ernest McConnell
FN	Frederick Noonan
GAL	G. Albert Lansburgh
GEB	George Edwin Bergstrom
GW	George Wyman
HA	Harrison Albright
HT&W	Howard, Train & Williams

JM	Julia Morgan
JP	John Parkinson
LLS	Loy L. Smith
M&W	Morgan & Walls
MW&C	Morgan, Walls & Clements
MW&M	Morgan, Walls & Morgan
N&W	Norton & Wallis
P&B	Parkinson & Bergstrom
RB	Reid Bros. (James and Merritt)
RBY	Robert Brown Young
S&W	Schultze & Weaver
SH	Sumner Hunt
SOC	Stiles O. Clements
W&E	Walker & Eisen
WLW	William Lee Woollett

For the area north of Third Street, see Victorian Downtown Los Angeles
For the area to the west of Hill Street, see Financial District, Los Angeles

	H I L L S T R E E T H I L L S T R E E T H I L L S T R E E T H I L L S T R E E T H I L L S T R E E T H I L L S T R E E T H I L L S T R E E T H I L L S T R E E T	250 333 W. 3rd Conservative; Life B. aka Western & Mutual Life B. 1901-?d HT&W now 🅿️	259; 1895– SH Irvine Byrne B. 1899–1911 I. Magnin/ Myer Siegel; 2007– Pan American Lofts	B R O A D W A Y B R O A D W A Y B R O A D W A Y B R O A D W A Y B R O A D W A Y B R O A D W A Y B R O A D W A Y B R O A D W A Y B R O A D W A Y B R O A D W A Y B R O A D W A Y B R O A D W A Y		257; 1899 RB Douglas B. So. Pac. RR ticket office now Douglas Lofts	S P R I N G S T R E E T S P R I N G S T R E E T S P R I N G S T R E E T S P R I N G S T R E E T S P R I N G S T R E E T S P R I N G S T R E E T	256; Stimson B. 1893–1963 CHB now 🅿️		M A I N S T R E E T M A I N S T R E E T M A I N S T R E E T M A I N S T R E E T M A I N S T R E E T M A I N S T R E E T M A I N S T R E E T M A I N S T R E E T			L O S A N G E L E S S T R E E T L O S A N G E L E S S T R E E T L O S A N G E L E S S T R E E T L O S A N G E L E S S T R E E T L O S A N G E L E S S T R E E T	
	H I L L S T R E E T H I L L S T R E E T H I L L S T R E E T H I L L S T R E E T H I L L S T R E E T H I L L S T R E E T H I L L S T R E E T H I L L S T R E E T	THIRD ST.		B R O A D W A Y B R O A D W A Y B R O A D W A Y B R O A D W A Y B R O A D W A Y B R O A D W A Y B R O A D W A Y B R O A D W A Y B R O A D W A Y B R O A D W A Y B R O A D W A Y B R O A D W A Y	THIRD ST.		S P R I N G S T R E E T S P R I N G S T R E E T S P R I N G S T R E E T S P R I N G S T R E E T S P R I N G S T R E E T S P R I N G S T R E E T	THIRD ST.		M A I N S T R E E T M A I N S T R E E T M A I N S T R E E T M A I N S T R E E T M A I N S T R E E T M A I N S T R E E T M A I N S T R E E T M A I N S T R E E T	THIRD (orig. MAYO) ST.		L O S A N G E L E S S T R E E T L O S A N G E L E S S T R E E T L O S A N G E L E S S T R E E T L O S A N G E L E S S T R E E T L O S A N G E L E S S T R E E T	
	H I L L S T R E E T H I L L S T R E E T H I L L S T R E E T H I L L S T R E E T H I L L S T R E E T H I L L S T R E E T H I L L S T R E E T H I L L S T R E E T	300; F. P. Fay Bldg 1904–90d D&F now 🅿️ garage	301–313; 1895–1917d Muskegon Block; 1918 WLW/ACM Chur; Million Dollar Th.	B R O A D W A Y B R O A D W A Y B R O A D W A Y B R O A D W A Y B R O A D W A Y B R O A D W A Y B R O A D W A Y B R O A D W A Y B R O A D W A Y B R O A D W A Y B R O A D W A Y B R O A D W A Y	300–310; Bradbury B. 1893 SH/GW Wilson Court former alley 312-6; Gilbert Block c.1900–c.60 Central Th. 1929–c.57 now Guadalupe wedding chapel	301–311 Washington B. 1912 P&B	S P R I N G S T R E E T S P R I N G S T R E E T S P R I N G S T R E E T S P R I N G S T R E E T S P R I N G S T R E E T S P R I N G S T R E E T	300–4; J. B. Lankershim Bldg a.k.a. National Title Bldg; 1897–1959d RBY 301–9; Schwartz Block 1888-d Hotel Jackson 1890s Citizens Nat'l Bank/ Cotton Exch Bldg 1906-?d HA now Reagan State Bldg 1990		M A I N S T R E E T M A I N S T R E E T M A I N S T R E E T M A I N S T R E E T M A I N S T R E E T M A I N S T R E E T M A I N S T R E E T M A I N S T R E E T	300–4; Thom Block d Milan H. Blakesley H. Lewis drugstore now 🅿️	126–30 E. 3rd Empire/ Unique Th. 1905 RBY now 🅿️	L O S A N G E L E S S T R E E T L O S A N G E L E S S T R E E T L O S A N G E L E S S T R E E T L O S A N G E L E S S T R E E T L O S A N G E L E S S T R E E T	Toy District
Angels Flight	H I L L S T R E E T H I L L S T R E E T H I L L S T R E E T H I L L S T R E E T H I L L S T R E E T H I L L S T R E E T H I L L S T R E E T H I L L S T R E E T	312-322 / 315–325; 1897 JP Homer Laughlin B. ds 1898–1905 Coulter's ds 1905–17 Ville de Paris; 1917– Grand Central Market		B R O A D W A Y B R O A D W A Y B R O A D W A Y B R O A D W A Y B R O A D W A Y B R O A D W A Y B R O A D W A Y B R O A D W A Y B R O A D W A Y B R O A D W A Y B R O A D W A Y B R O A D W A Y	318-22; Blackstone B. 1906–pres RBY; Blackstone DS 1906-17; The Fair; Cozy Theater 1930s-50s 324-6 Shannon B. 328-30 Boos Bros Cafeteria; 332-4 So. Cal. Music; 336-8 Gray B. 1950s: Central Stationery & Printing Co.	337-41; Salisbury Block; 343-7; Hogan B.	S P R I N G S T R E E T S P R I N G S T R E E T S P R I N G S T R E E T S P R I N G S T R E E T S P R I N G S T R E E T S P R I N G S T R E E T	308–314 / 311–317; Round House a.k.a. Garden of Paradise 1850s–1889: c.1890–? 311–3 Pinney Bldg; 315–7 Pridham Block; 319–25 Turnverein Hall (Turnhalle)/ New Star Vaudeville Th. 335–9 Belasco Th.		M A I N S T R E E T M A I N S T R E E T M A I N S T R E E T M A I N S T R E E T M A I N S T R E E T M A I N S T R E E T M A I N S T R E E T M A I N S T R E E T	312–324; Panorama B. 1880s-1984 Rotunda (rear); 1887–1907: Siege of Paris panorama/ stables/icerink 1907–52: Adolphus/ Hippodrome Theatre now 🅿️		L O S A N G E L E S S T R E E T L O S A N G E L E S S T R E E T L O S A N G E L E S S T R E E T L O S A N G E L E S S T R E E T L O S A N G E L E S S T R E E T	Toy District
357–361; 1913–d Black B. now Pershing Sq.	H I L L S T R E E T H I L L S T R E E T H I L L S T R E E T H I L L S T R E E T H I L L S T R E E T H I L L S T R E E T H I L L S T R E E T H I L L S T R E E T		331–335 ds 1900–35 Jacoby Bros. 355–363; 1898/1902 JP Grant Bldg jewelers Montgomery Bros. shoes W. E. Cummings	B R O A D W A Y B R O A D W A Y B R O A D W A Y B R O A D W A Y B R O A D W A Y B R O A D W A Y B R O A D W A Y B R O A D W A Y B R O A D W A Y B R O A D W A Y B R O A D W A Y B R O A D W A Y	340 Trustee B. 1905 PB 350 O. T. Johnson Block 1895 It RBY 356 O. T. Johnson Bldg; 1902 JB Rom	361; Citizen M hotel 2021–	S P R I N G S T R E E T S P R I N G S T R E E T S P R I N G S T R E E T S P R I N G S T R E E T S P R I N G S T R E E T S P R I N G S T R E E T	354; Hellman Bldg; 1903 AR now HWH 🏠	103 W 4th 1897 M&W; Hotel Van Nuys now Hotel Barclay🏠	M A I N S T R E E T M A I N S T R E E T M A I N S T R E E T M A I N S T R E E T M A I N S T R E E T M A I N S T R E E T M A I N S T R E E T M A I N S T R E E T	332–346; Hotel Westminster; 1888–1960d RBY now Medallion Apts🏠	335–399; Germaine; Bldg d Edison H. now retail, 🅿️	L O S A N G E L E S S T R E E T L O S A N G E L E S S T R E E T L O S A N G E L E S S T R E E T L O S A N G E L E S S T R E E T L O S A N G E L E S S T R E E T	Toy District
	H I L L S T R E E T H I L L S T R E E T H I L L S T R E E T H I L L S T R E E T H I L L S T R E E T H I L L S T R E E T H I L L S T R E E T H I L L S T R E E T	FOURTH ST.		B R O A D W A Y B R O A D W A Y B R O A D W A Y B R O A D W A Y B R O A D W A Y B R O A D W A Y B R O A D W A Y B R O A D W A Y B R O A D W A Y B R O A D W A Y B R O A D W A Y B R O A D W A Y	FOURTH ST.		S P R I N G S T R E E T S P R I N G S T R E E T S P R I N G S T R E E T S P R I N G S T R E E T S P R I N G S T R E E T S P R I N G S T R E E T	FOURTH ST.		M A I N S T R E E T M A I N S T R E E T M A I N S T R E E T M A I N S T R E E T M A I N S T R E E T M A I N S T R E E T M A I N S T R E E T M A I N S T R E E T	FOURTH ST.		L O S A N G E L E S S T R E E T L O S A N G E L E S S T R E E T L O S A N G E L E S S T R E E T L O S A N G E L E S S T R E E T L O S A N G E L E S S T R E E T	
	H I L L S T R E E T H I L L S T R E E T H I L L S T R E E T H I L L S T R E E T H I L L S T R E E T H I L L S T R E E T H I L L S T R E E T H I L L S T R E E T	400–412; Hotel Clarendon/ Hotel Sherman; 1895–1939 now 🅿️ lot 414–434; Wilson Bldg/ Occidental Hotel/ Clark Hotel ?–1913 401–5; J. A. Williams; Dry; Goods/ Broadway; Department; Store; Building; 1895– 1914d 1915: 401–23 B'way, 414–34 Hill were joined as the: Broadway Dept Store Bldg 1915 P&B; 1999 renamed Junípero Serra B. #2 The Broadway Department Store 1896–1973; State of California offices 1999–present		B R O A D W A Y B R O A D W A Y B R O A D W A Y B R O A D W A Y B R O A D W A Y B R O A D W A Y B R O A D W A Y B R O A D W A Y B R O A D W A Y B R O A D W A Y B R O A D W A Y B R O A D W A Y	400; Mason B. c.1897–d Perla on Broadway 🏠 2020	Angelus Hotel 1901–56d JP now 🅿️	S P R I N G S T R E E T S P R I N G S T R E E T S P R I N G S T R E E T S P R I N G S T R E E T S P R I N G S T R E E T S P R I N G S T R E E T	400; Continental; Bldg; 1902 JP/GB BA a.k.a. Braly Block now Continental Lofts 410; Isaias W. Hellman Bldg Annex; 1914 MW&M BA now Hellman Lofts 🏠	401; Farmers and Merchants Bank Bldg; 1905 MW&M BA 411; Isaias W. Hellman Bldg; 1905 MW&M BA now Hellman Lofts 🏠	M A I N S T R E E T M A I N S T R E E T M A I N S T R E E T M A I N S T R E E T M A I N S T R E E T M A I N S T R E E T M A I N S T R E E T M A I N S T R E E T	400; San; Fernando; B. 1906 IRR		L O S A N G E L E S S T R E E T L O S A N G E L E S S T R E E T L O S A N G E L E S S T R E E T L O S A N G E L E S S T R E E T L O S A N G E L E S S T R E E T	Toy District
417; Subway; Terminal; B. 1925–55 Pacific; Electric now res Metro 417	H I L L S T R E E T H I L L S T R E E T H I L L S T R E E T H I L L S T R E E T H I L L S T R E E T H I L L S T R E E T H I L L S T R E E T H I L L S T R E E T	436–8; Boos Bros. Cafeteria St. Clarenden H.	443–7 ?–1911 Brockton Shoes ds 1911–22 Myer Siegel ds 1922-c.1927 Bon Marché; 5&10¢ 1927–mid-90s: J. J. Newberry's; Fallas Paredes ds 1996-2022	B R O A D W A Y B R O A D W A Y B R O A D W A Y B R O A D W A Y B R O A D W A Y B R O A D W A Y B R O A D W A Y B R O A D W A Y B R O A D W A Y B R O A D W A Y B R O A D W A Y B R O A D W A Y	424; Judson C. Rive B. 1907	433; Title Insurance & Trust Co B. 1928; UCLA Extension	S P R I N G S T R E E T S P R I N G S T R E E T S P R I N G S T R E E T S P R I N G S T R E E T S P R I N G S T R E E T S P R I N G S T R E E T	416; Stowell/ El Dorado Hotel 1913 FN; El Dorado Lofts Dog Park		M A I N S T R E E T M A I N S T R E E T M A I N S T R E E T M A I N S T R E E T M A I N S T R E E T M A I N S T R E E T M A I N S T R E E T M A I N S T R E E T			L O S A N G E L E S S T R E E T L O S A N G E L E S S T R E E T L O S A N G E L E S S T R E E T L O S A N G E L E S S T R E E T L O S A N G E L E S S T R E E T	Toy District
(411 W. 5th); 1929-30 P&P AD; Title; Guarantee; B. now 🏠	H I L L S T R E E T H I L L S T R E E T H I L L S T R E E T H I L L S T R E E T H I L L S T R E E T H I L L S T R E E T H I L L S T R E E T H I L L S T R E E T		(515 W. 5th); 451–459; 1913 JP/GEB RR; Metropolitan B. 1914–34 Owl Drugs; 1913–26 Public Library; Foreman & Clark ds c.1915–28 1916–28 Janss land dev. Fallas Paredes ds 1996-2022; Now small/vacant retail, Downtown Metro Lofts	B R O A D W A Y B R O A D W A Y B R O A D W A Y B R O A D W A Y B R O A D W A Y B R O A D W A Y B R O A D W A Y B R O A D W A Y B R O A D W A Y B R O A D W A Y B R O A D W A Y B R O A D W A Y	Chester Williams B. 1926	453; Spring Arts Tower P&B; Citizens Nat'l Bank 1915–63; Crocker Bank 1963–70s Pacific Stock Exchange 1970s Now art studios, The Last Bookstore	S P R I N G S T R E E T S P R I N G S T R E E T S P R I N G S T R E E T S P R I N G S T R E E T S P R I N G S T R E E T S P R I N G S T R E E T	460; Rowan B. 1912; The Rowan 🏠	451; 1914 P&B BA; Hotel; Rosslyn now Rosslyn Lofts	M A I N S T R E E T M A I N S T R E E T M A I N S T R E E T M A I N S T R E E T M A I N S T R E E T M A I N S T R E E T M A I N S T R E E T M A I N S T R E E T		121 E. 5th King; Edward; Hotel; 1906 P&B now 🏠.	L O S A N G E L E S S T R E E T L O S A N G E L E S S T R E E T L O S A N G E L E S S T R E E T L O S A N G E L E S S T R E E T L O S A N G E L E S S T R E E T	Toy District
	H I L L S T R E E T H I L L S T R E E T H I L L S T R E E T H I L L S T R E E T H I L L S T R E E T H I L L S T R E E T H I L L S T R E E T H I L L S T R E E T	FIFTH ST.		B R O A D W A Y B R O A D W A Y B R O A D W A Y B R O A D W A Y B R O A D W A Y B R O A D W A Y B R O A D W A Y B R O A D W A Y B R O A D W A Y B R O A D W A Y B R O A D W A Y B R O A D W A Y	FIFTH ST.		S P R I N G S T R E E T S P R I N G S T R E E T S P R I N G S T R E E T S P R I N G S T R E E T S P R I N G S T R E E T S P R I N G S T R E E T	FIFTH ST.		M A I N S T R E E T M A I N S T R E E T M A I N S T R E E T M A I N S T R E E T M A I N S T R E E T M A I N S T R E E T M A I N S T R E E T M A I N S T R E E T	FIFTH ST.		L O S A N G E L E S S T R E E T L O S A N G E L E S S T R E E T L O S A N G E L E S S T R E E T L O S A N G E L E S S T R E E T L O S A N G E L E S S T R E E T	
PERSHING; SQUARE	H I L L S T R E E T H I L L S T R E E T H I L L S T R E E T H I L L S T R E E T H I L L S T R E E T H I L L S T R E E T H I L L S T R E E T H I L L S T R E E T	Pershing Square	Fifth Street Store ds	B R O A D W A Y B R O A D W A Y B R O A D W A Y B R O A D W A Y B R O A D W A Y B R O A D W A Y B R O A D W A Y B R O A D W A Y B R O A D W A Y B R O A D W A Y B R O A D W A Y B R O A D W A Y	518 Roxie Th. 528 Cameo Th. 534 Arcade Th. now retail	501; Hotel Alexandria 1906	S P R I N G S T R E E T S P R I N G S T R E E T S P R I N G S T R E E T S P R I N G S T R E E T S P R I N G S T R E E T S P R I N G S T R E E T	510; Security Bldg 1907 PB; Security T&SB now Security Bldg Lofts	514; Hotel; Rosslyn; Annex	M A I N S T R E E T M A I N S T R E E T M A I N S T R E E T M A I N S T R E E T M A I N S T R E E T M A I N S T R E E T M A I N S T R E E T M A I N S T R E E T	500–2; Charnock; Block; 1889 Vic/SE; Pershing Hotel now New; Pershing; Apts	501; Baltimore; Hotel 1910 now 🏠	L O S A N G E L E S S T R E E T L O S A N G E L E S S T R E E T L O S A N G E L E S S T R E E T L O S A N G E L E S S T R E E T L O S A N G E L E S S T R E E T	
PERSHING; SQUARE	H I L L S T R E E T H I L L S T R E E T H I L L S T R E E T H I L L S T R E E T H I L L S T R E E T H I L L S T R E E T H I L L S T R E E T H I L L S T R E E T			B R O A D W A Y B R O A D W A Y B R O A D W A Y B R O A D W A Y B R O A D W A Y B R O A D W A Y B R O A D W A Y B R O A D W A Y B R O A D W A Y B R O A D W A Y B R O A D W A Y B R O A D W A Y	538–546 Spring Arcade 537–543 (a.k.a. Broadway Arcade) 543; Desmond's ds 1915–24		S P R I N G S T R E E T S P R I N G S T R E E T S P R I N G S T R E E T S P R I N G S T R E E T S P R I N G S T R E E T S P R I N G S T R E E T	514; Security T&SB 1916 JP BA now L.A. Theater Center		M A I N S T R E E T M A I N S T R E E T M A I N S T R E E T M A I N S T R E E T M A I N S T R E E T M A I N S T R E E T M A I N S T R E E T M A I N S T R E E T	545 🅿️	550; Topaz Apts 2018	L O S A N G E L E S S T R E E T L O S A N G E L E S S T R E E T L O S A N G E L E S S T R E E T L O S A N G E L E S S T R E E T L O S A N G E L E S S T R E E T	
PERSHING; SQUARE	H I L L S T R E E T H I L L S T R E E T H I L L S T R E E T H I L L S T R E E T H I L L S T R E E T H I L L S T R E E T H I L L S T R E E T H I L L S T R E E T	550; Paramount Th. International; Jewelry Ctr	555–61 ds Swelldom	B R O A D W A Y B R O A D W A Y B R O A D W A Y B R O A D W A Y B R O A D W A Y B R O A D W A Y B R O A D W A Y B R O A D W A Y B R O A D W A Y B R O A D W A Y B R O A D W A Y B R O A D W A Y	556–558 ds Silverwoods (1904–74) now Broadway Jewelry Mart	(215 W. Spring); 561; 1910 JP/GEB Trust & Savings Bank Bldg; 1910 L.A. T&SB; 1922 Pacific SW T&SB now Randolph Lofts	S P R I N G S T R E E T S P R I N G S T R E E T S P R I N G S T R E E T S P R I N G S T R E E T S P R I N G S T R E E T S P R I N G S T R E E T	548; Marley Lofts		M A I N S T R E E T M A I N S T R E E T M A I N S T R E E T M A I N S T R E E T M A I N S T R E E T M A I N S T R E E T M A I N S T R E E T M A I N S T R E E T	560; Santa Fe B. 1908 M&W BA now Santa Fe Lofts		L O S A N G E L E S S T R E E T L O S A N G E L E S S T R E E T L O S A N G E L E S S T R E E T L O S A N G E L E S S T R E E T L O S A N G E L E S S T R E E T	
	H I L L S T R E E T H I L L S T R E E T H I L L S T R E E T H I L L S T R E E T H I L L S T R E E T H I L L S T R E E T H I L L S T R E E T H I L L S T R E E T	SIXTH ST.		B R O A D W A Y B R O A D W A Y B R O A D W A Y B R O A D W A Y B R O A D W A Y B R O A D W A Y B R O A D W A Y B R O A D W A Y B R O A D W A Y B R O A D W A Y B R O A D W A Y B R O A D W A Y	SIXTH ST.		S P R I N G S T R E E T S P R I N G S T R E E T S P R I N G S T R E E T S P R I N G S T R E E T S P R I N G S T R E E T S P R I N G S T R E E T	SIXTH ST.		M A I N S T R E E T M A I N S T R E E T M A I N S T R E E T M A I N S T R E E T M A I N S T R E E T M A I N S T R E E T M A I N S T R E E T M A I N S T R E E T	SIXTH ST.		L O S A N G E L E S S T R E E T L O S A N G E L E S S T R E E T L O S A N G E L E S S T R E E T L O S A N G E L E S S T R E E T L O S A N G E L E S S T R E E T	
Consolidated; Realty; B. 1908/35 now California Jewelry Mart Sun Realty B. 1931; L.A. Jewelry; Center 635; Harris & Frank B. 1925; Harris & Frank 1925–50 now Wholesale; Jewelry; Exchange	H I L L S T R E E T H I L L S T R E E T H I L L S T R E E T H I L L S T R E E T H I L L S T R E E T H I L L S T R E E T H I L L S T R E E T H I L L S T R E E T	606; Western; Jewelry; Mart 608; William Fox B. 1932; Fox; Jewelry; Plaza	601-605; 1907 P&B H. Jevne Co B. grocer 1907–20 H. Jevne; 1921–31 Bedell Dept Store; 1936–8 Jacoby's; 1940–? Zukor's now Three One Four apts 615; Los Angeles Th.	B R O A D W A Y B R O A D W A Y B R O A D W A Y B R O A D W A Y B R O A D W A Y B R O A D W A Y B R O A D W A Y B R O A D W A Y B R O A D W A Y B R O A D W A Y B R O A D W A Y B R O A D W A Y	600–610; Walter P. Story B. 1909 MW&C BA; Mullen & Bluett ds 616; Desmond's ds 620; Schaber's cafeteria 630 Palace Th. 1911 GAL RR 644; Joseph E Carr B. 1909 HH; W & J. Sloane 1909–1935; Brooks Clothing Co 1935–47; Harris & Frank 1947–80 648; Boos Bros. Cafeteria 1916; Clifton's Cafeteria 1935–	601; Hotel Hayward 621; E. F. Hutton 1931 625; California Canadian Bank 1923 639; Barclays Bank 1919	S P R I N G S T R E E T S P R I N G S T R E E T S P R I N G S T R E E T S P R I N G S T R E E T S P R I N G S T R E E T S P R I N G S T R E E T	600; United California Bank B. 1961 CB; U.C.B. HQ 1961–73 now Thurman Lofts 618; Stock Exchange B. 1931 P&P CM; L. A. Stock Exchange; Pacific Stock Exch. now ExchangeLA nightclub 626; Mortgage Guaranty B. 1913; City Lofts 632–4; Banks & Huntley B. 1930 P&P AD		M A I N S T R E E T M A I N S T R E E T M A I N S T R E E T M A I N S T R E E T M A I N S T R E E T M A I N S T R E E T M A I N S T R E E T M A I N S T R E E T	610; Pacific; Electric; B. 1905; Pacific; Electric; Lofts 640; Hotel Cecil; 1924–pres LLS		L O S A N G E L E S S T R E E T L O S A N G E L E S S T R E E T L O S A N G E L E S S T R E E T L O S A N G E L E S S T R E E T L O S A N G E L E S S T R E E T	
651–7; 410 W. 7th 1920 BMP BA; Pantages/ Warner Bros Th now Jewelry; Theater Center	H I L L S T R E E T H I L L S T R E E T H I L L S T R E E T H I L L S T R E E T H I L L S T R E E T H I L L S T R E E T H I L L S T R E E T H I L L S T R E E T	640–50 / 639–59; Bullock's ds 1907 P&B now St. Vincent Jewelry Ctr		B R O A D W A Y B R O A D W A Y B R O A D W A Y B R O A D W A Y B R O A D W A Y B R O A D W A Y B R O A D W A Y B R O A D W A Y B R O A D W A Y B R O A D W A Y B R O A D W A Y B R O A D W A Y	656–666 (219 W 7th); Haas B. 1915 MW&M BA now 🏠, hotel, retail	215 W. 7th 651–3; Bartlett Bldg; 1911 P&B; Union Oil HQ; 1911–23; 2002–pres 🏠	S P R I N G S T R E E T S P R I N G S T R E E T S P R I N G S T R E E T S P R I N G S T R E E T S P R I N G S T R E E T S P R I N G S T R E E T	650; Bank of America Bldg; 1924 S&W now Jaide Lofts		M A I N S T R E E T M A I N S T R E E T M A I N S T R E E T M A I N S T R E E T M A I N S T R E E T M A I N S T R E E T M A I N S T R E E T M A I N S T R E E T			L O S A N G E L E S S T R E E T L O S A N G E L E S S T R E E T L O S A N G E L E S S T R E E T L O S A N G E L E S S T R E E T L O S A N G E L E S S T R E E T	
	H I L L S T R E E T H I L L S T R E E T H I L L S T R E E T H I L L S T R E E T H I L L S T R E E T H I L L S T R E E T H I L L S T R E E T H I L L S T R E E T	SEVENTH ST.		B R O A D W A Y B R O A D W A Y B R O A D W A Y B R O A D W A Y B R O A D W A Y B R O A D W A Y B R O A D W A Y B R O A D W A Y B R O A D W A Y B R O A D W A Y B R O A D W A Y B R O A D W A Y	SEVENTH ST.		S P R I N G S T R E E T S P R I N G S T R E E T S P R I N G S T R E E T S P R I N G S T R E E T S P R I N G S T R E E T S P R I N G S T R E E T	SEVENTH ST.		M A I N S T R E E T M A I N S T R E E T M A I N S T R E E T M A I N S T R E E T M A I N S T R E E T M A I N S T R E E T M A I N S T R E E T M A I N S T R E E T	SEVENTH ST.		L O S A N G E L E S S T R E E T L O S A N G E L E S S T R E E T L O S A N G E L E S S T R E E T L O S A N G E L E S S T R E E T L O S A N G E L E S S T R E E T	
701; Foreman & Clark B. 1928 C&B AD/NG; Foreman & Clark ds	H I L L S T R E E T H I L L S T R E E T H I L L S T R E E T H I L L S T R E E T H I L L S T R E E T H I L L S T R E E T H I L L S T R E E T H I L L S T R E E T		703 State Th.	B R O A D W A Y B R O A D W A Y B R O A D W A Y B R O A D W A Y B R O A D W A Y B R O A D W A Y B R O A D W A Y B R O A D W A Y B R O A D W A Y B R O A D W A Y B R O A D W A Y B R O A D W A Y	700; Hotel Lankershim 1905–80s d now 🅿️ w/1st floor retail 720; Z. L. Parmelee B. 1907; Parmelee Co. gas/electric fixtures 722; Sassony B. 1909 Barker Bros. furniture 1909–1936 at 724-732; 728–734 is now 🅿️ w/1st floor retail 740; Garland B. 1913 MW&M NC; Globe Th. orig. Morosco Th.	701; Van; Nuys; Bldg; M&W 1911 RR now Van; Nuys; Apts	S P R I N G S T R E E T S P R I N G S T R E E T S P R I N G S T R E E T S P R I N G S T R E E T S P R I N G S T R E E T S P R I N G S T R E E T	700–4; 140 W. 7th Financial; Center; Bldg; N&W 1924 BA		M A I N S T R E E T M A I N S T R E E T M A I N S T R E E T M A I N S T R E E T M A I N S T R E E T M A I N S T R E E T M A I N S T R E E T M A I N S T R E E T	700; Dearden's ds 1909-2017		L O S A N G E L E S S T R E E T L O S A N G E L E S S T R E E T L O S A N G E L E S S T R E E T L O S A N G E L E S S T R E E T L O S A N G E L E S S T R E E T	
757–61; 401–15 W. 8th Title Insurance & Trust Co ?–1928; Garfield Bldg; 1930–pres	H I L L S T R E E T H I L L S T R E E T H I L L S T R E E T H I L L S T R E E T H I L L S T R E E T H I L L S T R E E T H I L L S T R E E T H I L L S T R E E T	Union Bank & Trust Co. B. 1922 C&B now Union Lofts		B R O A D W A Y B R O A D W A Y B R O A D W A Y B R O A D W A Y B R O A D W A Y B R O A D W A Y B R O A D W A Y B R O A D W A Y B R O A D W A Y B R O A D W A Y B R O A D W A Y B R O A D W A Y	756; Chapman B. 1912 EM BA HCM #899 orig. L.A. Investment Co B. now Chapman Flats	755; Griffin on Spring 🏠 24 fl. 2018	S P R I N G S T R E E T S P R I N G S T R E E T S P R I N G S T R E E T S P R I N G S T R E E T S P R I N G S T R E E T S P R I N G S T R E E T	756 Great; Republic; Life B. 1927 W&E BA; Gr. Rep. Life now Gr. Rep. Lofts		M A I N S T R E E T M A I N S T R E E T M A I N S T R E E T M A I N S T R E E T M A I N S T R E E T M A I N S T R E E T M A I N S T R E E T M A I N S T R E E T			L O S A N G E L E S S T R E E T L O S A N G E L E S S T R E E T L O S A N G E L E S S T R E E T L O S A N G E L E S S T R E E T L O S A N G E L E S S T R E E T	
	H I L L S T R E E T H I L L S T R E E T H I L L S T R E E T H I L L S T R E E T H I L L S T R E E T H I L L S T R E E T H I L L S T R E E T H I L L S T R E E T	EIGHTH ST.		B R O A D W A Y B R O A D W A Y B R O A D W A Y B R O A D W A Y B R O A D W A Y B R O A D W A Y B R O A D W A Y B R O A D W A Y B R O A D W A Y B R O A D W A Y B R O A D W A Y B R O A D W A Y	EIGHTH ST.		S P R I N G S T R E E T S P R I N G S T R E E T S P R I N G S T R E E T S P R I N G S T R E E T S P R I N G S T R E E T S P R I N G S T R E E T	EIGHTH ST.		M A I N S T R E E T M A I N S T R E E T M A I N S T R E E T M A I N S T R E E T M A I N S T R E E T M A I N S T R E E T M A I N S T R E E T M A I N S T R E E T	EIGHTH ST.		L O S A N G E L E S S T R E E T L O S A N G E L E S S T R E E T L O S A N G E L E S S T R E E T L O S A N G E L E S S T R E E T L O S A N G E L E S S T R E E T	
825; 1922–63 RKO; Hillstreet; Th. now 820 Olive / 825 S. Hill 🏠	H I L L S T R E E T H I L L S T R E E T H I L L S T R E E T H I L L S T R E E T H I L L S T R E E T H I L L S T R E E T H I L L S T R E E T H I L L S T R E E T	830 / 801; May Company B. Hamburger's ds 1908–1923; May Company ds 1923–1986; Broadway Trade Center –2015 retail, garment manufacturing planned retail, offices, hotel		B R O A D W A Y B R O A D W A Y B R O A D W A Y B R O A D W A Y B R O A D W A Y B R O A D W A Y B R O A D W A Y B R O A D W A Y B R O A D W A Y B R O A D W A Y B R O A D W A Y B R O A D W A Y	802 Tower Th. 1927 BR 812 Rialto Th. 1917 AD/CR 842 Orpheum Th. (1926 BA)	200 W. 8th 1923 Lane Mortgage B. now The Craftsman	S P R I N G S T R E E T S P R I N G S T R E E T S P R I N G S T R E E T S P R I N G S T R E E T S P R I N G S T R E E T S P R I N G S T R E E T	810; National; City; Tower; 1924 AW/PE		M A I N S T R E E T M A I N S T R E E T M A I N S T R E E T M A I N S T R E E T M A I N S T R E E T M A I N S T R E E T M A I N S T R E E T M A I N S T R E E T	810; California; Th. 1918–90 BA		L O S A N G E L E S S T R E E T L O S A N G E L E S S T R E E T L O S A N G E L E S S T R E E T L O S A N G E L E S S T R E E T L O S A N G E L E S S T R E E T	824; Gray B.
855; Coast Fed. Savings; B. 1926 JM	H I L L S T R E E T H I L L S T R E E T H I L L S T R E E T H I L L S T R E E T H I L L S T R E E T H I L L S T R E E T H I L L S T R E E T H I L L S T R E E T	850; The Alexan planned 26 fl. 🏠	849; Eastern Columbia B. 1930 CB AD; 1930–57 Eastern Col. DS; 2006–pres Eastern Col. Lofts	B R O A D W A Y B R O A D W A Y B R O A D W A Y B R O A D W A Y B R O A D W A Y B R O A D W A Y B R O A D W A Y B R O A D W A Y B R O A D W A Y B R O A D W A Y B R O A D W A Y B R O A D W A Y		833; City Club B. 1925 LLS	S P R I N G S T R E E T S P R I N G S T R E E T S P R I N G S T R E E T S P R I N G S T R E E T S P R I N G S T R E E T S P R I N G S T R E E T			M A I N S T R E E T M A I N S T R E E T M A I N S T R E E T M A I N S T R E E T M A I N S T R E E T M A I N S T R E E T M A I N S T R E E T M A I N S T R E E T		851; Harris; Newmark; B. 1926 C&B RR	L O S A N G E L E S S T R E E T L O S A N G E L E S S T R E E T L O S A N G E L E S S T R E E T L O S A N G E L E S S T R E E T L O S A N G E L E S S T R E E T	860; Cooper B. 1926 C&B; Cooper Design Space
	H I L L S T R E E T H I L L S T R E E T H I L L S T R E E T H I L L S T R E E T H I L L S T R E E T H I L L S T R E E T H I L L S T R E E T H I L L S T R E E T	NINTH ST.		B R O A D W A Y B R O A D W A Y B R O A D W A Y B R O A D W A Y B R O A D W A Y B R O A D W A Y B R O A D W A Y B R O A D W A Y B R O A D W A Y B R O A D W A Y B R O A D W A Y B R O A D W A Y	NINTH ST.					M A I N S T R E E T M A I N S T R E E T M A I N S T R E E T M A I N S T R E E T M A I N S T R E E T M A I N S T R E E T M A I N S T R E E T M A I N S T R E E T	NINTH ST.		L O S A N G E L E S S T R E E T L O S A N G E L E S S T R E E T L O S A N G E L E S S T R E E T L O S A N G E L E S S T R E E T L O S A N G E L E S S T R E E T	
small retail	H I L L S T R E E T H I L L S T R E E T H I L L S T R E E T H I L L S T R E E T H I L L S T R E E T H I L L S T R E E T H I L L S T R E E T H I L L S T R E E T	912; May Co Garage B.1926 939; South; Park 🏠	901; Blackstone's ds 1907–1917 1927 W&E/CHC SG 929; Cal. Petroleum/Texaco B. 2014–24 Ace Hotel now STILE hotel 1927–89 United Artists Th. 1989 Gene Scott's church 2014–24 Th. at Ace Hotel now United Th.	B R O A D W A Y B R O A D W A Y B R O A D W A Y B R O A D W A Y B R O A D W A Y B R O A D W A Y B R O A D W A Y B R O A D W A Y B R O A D W A Y B R O A D W A Y B R O A D W A Y B R O A D W A Y						M A I N S T R E E T M A I N S T R E E T M A I N S T R E E T M A I N S T R E E T M A I N S T R E E T M A I N S T R E E T M A I N S T R E E T M A I N S T R E E T			L O S A N G E L E S S T R E E T L O S A N G E L E S S T R E E T L O S A N G E L E S S T R E E T L O S A N G E L E S S T R E E T L O S A N G E L E S S T R E E T	910; Gerry; B. 1947 SM
	H I L L S T R E E T H I L L S T R E E T H I L L S T R E E T H I L L S T R E E T H I L L S T R E E T H I L L S T R E E T H I L L S T R E E T H I L L S T R E E T	OLYMPIC BL.		B R O A D W A Y B R O A D W A Y B R O A D W A Y B R O A D W A Y B R O A D W A Y B R O A D W A Y B R O A D W A Y B R O A D W A Y B R O A D W A Y B R O A D W A Y B R O A D W A Y B R O A D W A Y	(formerly TENTH ST.)					M A I N S T R E E T M A I N S T R E E T M A I N S T R E E T M A I N S T R E E T M A I N S T R E E T M A I N S T R E E T M A I N S T R E E T M A I N S T R E E T	OLYMPIC BL.		L O S A N G E L E S S T R E E T L O S A N G E L E S S T R E E T L O S A N G E L E S S T R E E T L O S A N G E L E S S T R E E T L O S A N G E L E S S T R E E T	
	H I L L S T R E E T H I L L S T R E E T H I L L S T R E E T H I L L S T R E E T H I L L S T R E E T H I L L S T R E E T H I L L S T R E E T H I L L S T R E E T	1000 53 fl 🏠 Olympic & Hill		B R O A D W A Y B R O A D W A Y B R O A D W A Y B R O A D W A Y B R O A D W A Y B R O A D W A Y B R O A D W A Y B R O A D W A Y B R O A D W A Y B R O A D W A Y B R O A D W A Y B R O A D W A Y	1026 S. Broadway Broadway Palace Apts 2017 S. Hill 1001–51					M A I N S T R E E T M A I N S T R E E T M A I N S T R E E T M A I N S T R E E T M A I N S T R E E T M A I N S T R E E T M A I N S T R E E T M A I N S T R E E T			L O S A N G E L E S S T R E E T L O S A N G E L E S S T R E E T L O S A N G E L E S S T R E E T L O S A N G E L E S S T R E E T L O S A N G E L E S S T R E E T	
	H I L L S T R E E T H I L L S T R E E T H I L L S T R E E T H I L L S T R E E T H I L L S T R E E T H I L L S T R E E T H I L L S T R E E T H I L L S T R E E T	1038 1927 SOC; Mayan Th.	1023 1925 W&E BA; Western Pacific B.	B R O A D W A Y B R O A D W A Y B R O A D W A Y B R O A D W A Y B R O A D W A Y B R O A D W A Y B R O A D W A Y B R O A D W A Y B R O A D W A Y B R O A D W A Y B R O A D W A Y B R O A D W A Y	1026 S. Broadway Broadway Palace Apts 2017 S. Hill 1001–51					M A I N S T R E E T M A I N S T R E E T M A I N S T R E E T M A I N S T R E E T M A I N S T R E E T M A I N S T R E E T M A I N S T R E E T M A I N S T R E E T			L O S A N G E L E S S T R E E T L O S A N G E L E S S T R E E T L O S A N G E L E S S T R E E T L O S A N G E L E S S T R E E T L O S A N G E L E S S T R E E T	
1061; White Log bar/rest. 1932 Nov	H I L L S T R E E T H I L L S T R E E T H I L L S T R E E T H I L L S T R E E T H I L L S T R E E T H I L L S T R E E T H I L L S T R E E T H I L L S T R E E T	1050; 1926 MWC Chur; Belasco Th.		B R O A D W A Y B R O A D W A Y B R O A D W A Y B R O A D W A Y B R O A D W A Y B R O A D W A Y B R O A D W A Y B R O A D W A Y B R O A D W A Y B R O A D W A Y B R O A D W A Y B R O A D W A Y	1060; L. A. Railway HQ 1925 now Hoxton Hotel					M A I N S T R E E T M A I N S T R E E T M A I N S T R E E T M A I N S T R E E T M A I N S T R E E T M A I N S T R E E T M A I N S T R E E T M A I N S T R E E T			L O S A N G E L E S S T R E E T L O S A N G E L E S S T R E E T L O S A N G E L E S S T R E E T L O S A N G E L E S S T R E E T L O S A N G E L E S S T R E E T	
	H I L L S T R E E T H I L L S T R E E T H I L L S T R E E T H I L L S T R E E T H I L L S T R E E T H I L L S T R E E T H I L L S T R E E T H I L L S T R E E T	ELEVENTH ST.		B R O A D W A Y B R O A D W A Y B R O A D W A Y B R O A D W A Y B R O A D W A Y B R O A D W A Y B R O A D W A Y B R O A D W A Y B R O A D W A Y B R O A D W A Y B R O A D W A Y B R O A D W A Y	ELEVENTH ST.					M A I N S T R E E T M A I N S T R E E T M A I N S T R E E T M A I N S T R E E T M A I N S T R E E T M A I N S T R E E T M A I N S T R E E T M A I N S T R E E T	ELEVENTH ST.		L O S A N G E L E S S T R E E T L O S A N G E L E S S T R E E T L O S A N G E L E S S T R E E T L O S A N G E L E S S T R E E T L O S A N G E L E S S T R E E T	
1111; Sky Trees; Tower planned 43-fl. 🏠	H I L L S T R E E T H I L L S T R E E T H I L L S T R E E T H I L L S T R E E T H I L L S T R E E T H I L L S T R E E T H I L L S T R E E T H I L L S T R E E T		(146 W. 11th St.) 1101; 1914 Herald Examiner B. newspaper 1914–89 Herald Examiner	B R O A D W A Y B R O A D W A Y B R O A D W A Y B R O A D W A Y B R O A D W A Y B R O A D W A Y B R O A D W A Y B R O A D W A Y B R O A D W A Y B R O A D W A Y B R O A D W A Y B R O A D W A Y	1100; Commercial Club (Chamber of Commerce social club) 1926 C&B RR now Proper Hotel			1101; 110 W. 11th Harris B. 1923 BA		M A I N S T R E E T M A I N S T R E E T M A I N S T R E E T M A I N S T R E E T M A I N S T R E E T M A I N S T R E E T M A I N S T R E E T M A I N S T R E E T			L O S A N G E L E S S T R E E T L O S A N G E L E S S T R E E T L O S A N G E L E S S T R E E T L O S A N G E L E S S T R E E T L O S A N G E L E S S T R E E T	

== Transportation ==
Main Street carries Metro Local lines: 10, 33, 48, 55, 76, and 92; most of those lines run on Main Street in downtown only, while Line 76 serves Main Street in Northeast Los Angeles and Line 48 in South Los Angeles. The A Line of the Los Angeles Metro Rail System meets Main Street at its intersection with North Vignes Street near the Chinatown Station. The B and D lines are just past the intersection of Main Street and North Alameda Street near Union Station.

== Major intersections ==
Location	mi	km	Destinations	Notes
Carson–Los Angeles line	0.0	0.0	Lomita Boulevard / Wilmington Boulevard south	Southern terminus of Main Street, road continues as Wilmington Boulevard
Carson	0.7	1.1	Sepulveda Boulevard	
Carson	3.8	6.1	I-405 south / unsigned frontage road to Figueroa Street – San Diego	No access to I-405 north; I-405 north exit 36
Carson	4.0	6.4	Broadway north	
Carson	5.2	8.4	SR 91 east / Albertoni Street To I-110	No direct entrance to SR 91 west, as this on-ramp connects to I-110 instead; exits from I-110 are via SR 91; SR 91 exit 7A
Carson–West Rancho Dominguez line	6.2	10.0	Alondra Boulevard	
West Rancho Dominguez	6.8	10.9	Compton Boulevard	
Los Angeles	9.3	15.0	Imperial Highway	
Los Angeles	10.3	16.6	Century Boulevard	
Los Angeles	11.3	18.2	Manchester Avenue	Former SR 42
Los Angeles	12.3	19.8	Florence Avenue	
Los Angeles	13.3	21.4	Slauson Avenue	
Los Angeles	14.2	22.9	46th Street / San Pedro Place to San Pedro Street	
Los Angeles	14.4	23.2	Vermont Avenue	
Los Angeles	14.9	24.0	Martin Luther King Jr. Boulevard	
Los Angeles	15.2	24.5	Broadway Place to Broadway / 36th Street / 36th Place	
Los Angeles	15.4	24.8	Jefferson Boulevard	
Los Angeles	15.9	25.6	Adams Boulevard	
Los Angeles	16.4	26.4	Washington Boulevard	
Los Angeles	17.2	27.7	Olympic Boulevard	
Los Angeles	18.2	29.3	2nd Street	
Los Angeles	18.3	29.5	1st Street	
Los Angeles	18.4	29.6	Temple Street	
Los Angeles	20.9	33.6	Mission Road / Valley Boulevard east	
1.000 mi = 1.609 km; 1.000 km = 0.621 mi: Incomplete access
