= Downtown Los Angeles in the Gilded Age =

Coordinates: 34.053°N 118.244°W

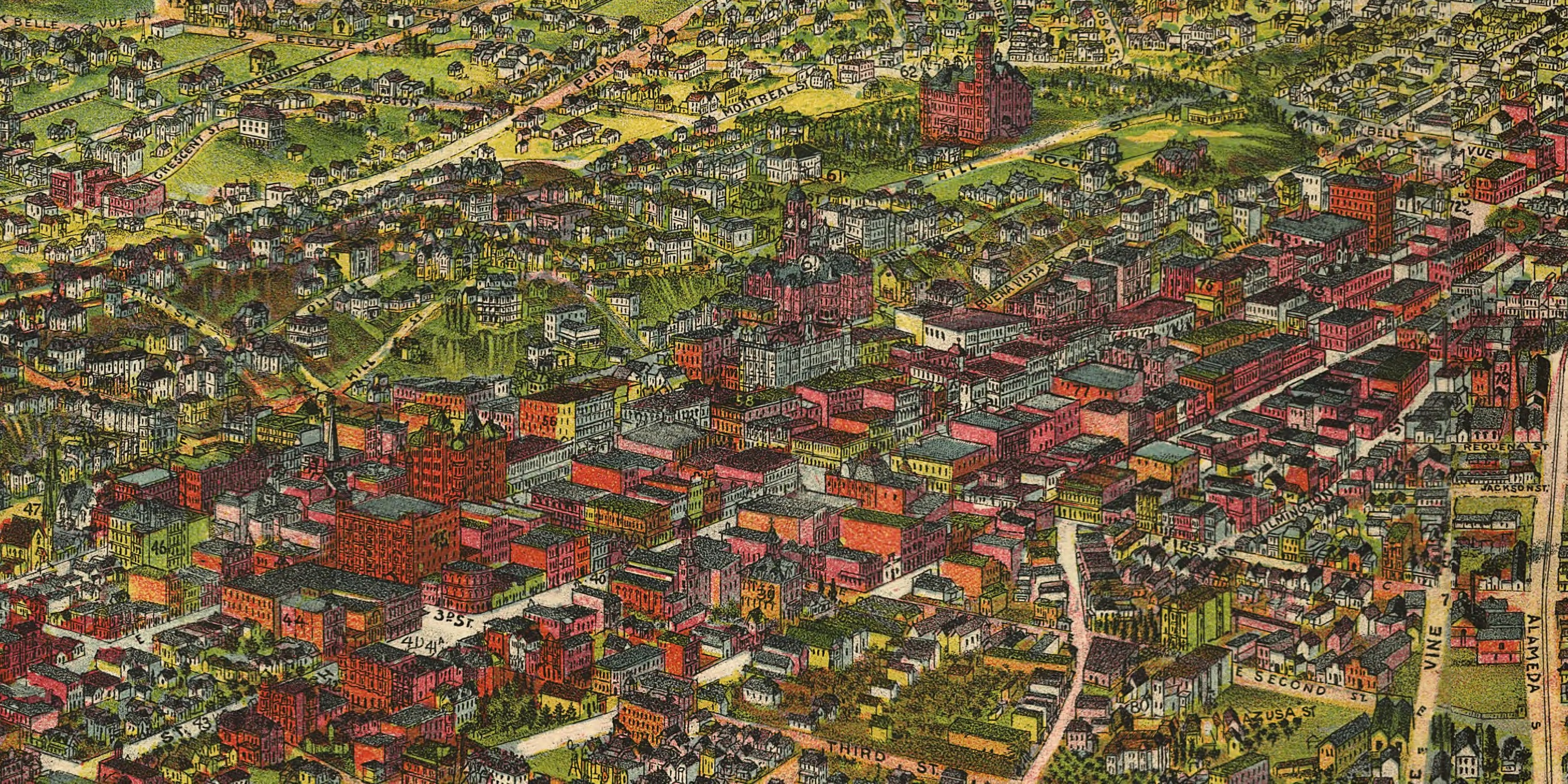
1894 drawing by Bruce Wellington Pierce: portion from Third Street (bottom left) to Plaza (top right). The Red Sandstone Courthouse with its clocktower is prominent at center. At upper right is Los Angeles High School on Fort Moore Hill.

In 1880, Downtown Los Angeles was centered at the southern end of the Los Angeles Plaza area. Through the beginning of the 20th century, it extended south and west along Main Street, Spring Street, and Broadway towards Third Street. Most of the 19th-century buildings no longer exist, surviving only in the Plaza area or south of Second Street. The rest were demolished to make way for the Civic Center district with City Hall, numerous courthouses, and other municipal, county, state and federal buildings, and Times Mirror Square.

During the late 19th century, the area was referred to as the business center, business section or business district. By 1910, it was referred to as the "North End" of the business district, which by then had expanded south to what is today called the Historic Core, along Broadway, Spring and Main roughly from 3rd to 9th streets.

== Location ==
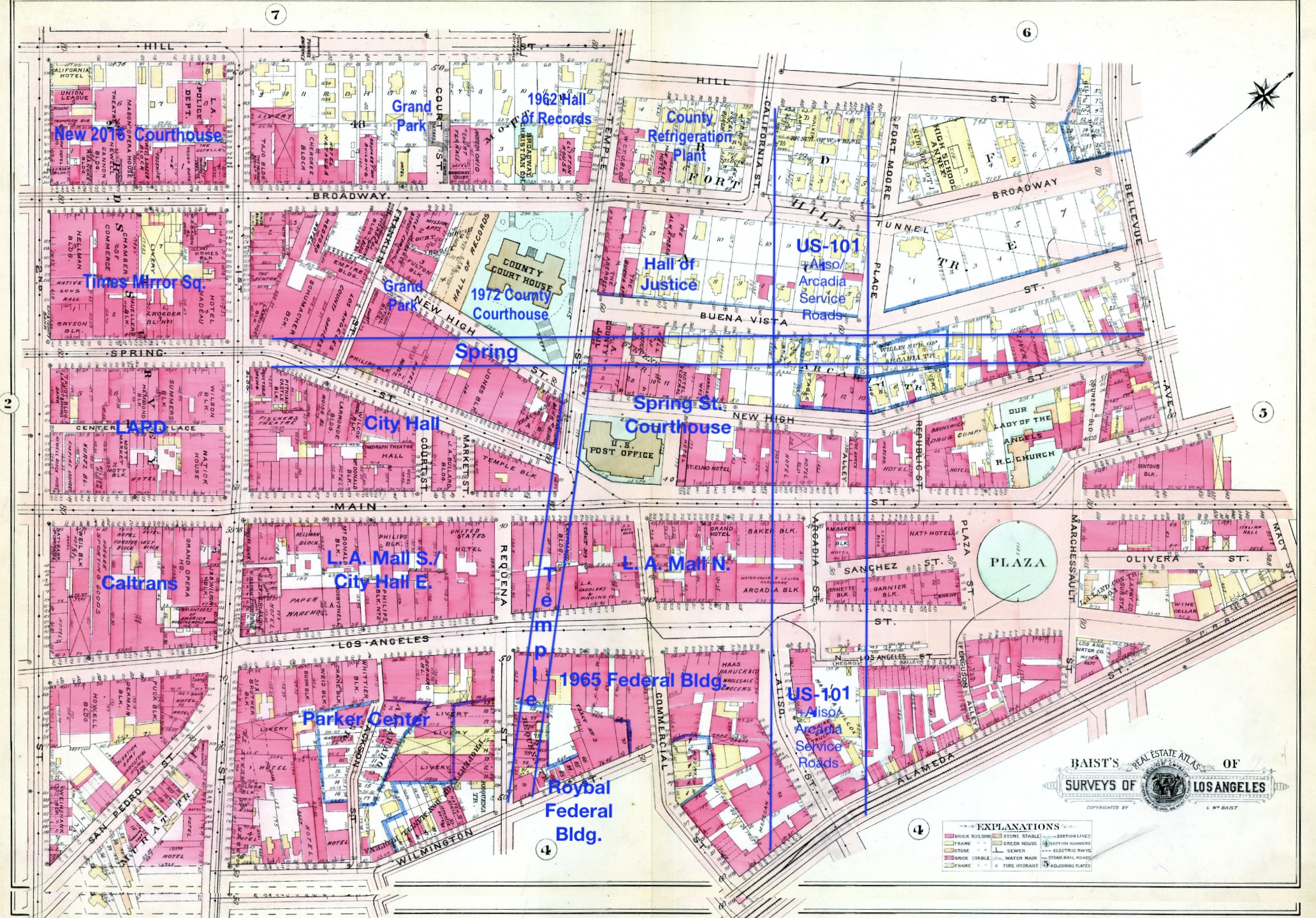
Baist's 1910 map of the area. In blue, superimposed on the map: later changes in Spring and Temple streets, the current path of US-101, and most of the largest buildings standing today.

By the mid-1890s, First and Spring was the center of the business district; the Bradbury Building opened in 1893 at Third and Broadway and is still standing today. By 1910, the area north of Fourth Street was considered the "North End" of the business district and there were already concerns about its deterioration, as the center of commerce moved to what is now known as the Historic Core, from Third to Ninth streets.

== Map ==
The map shows the street grid in 1910, and shows in blue three important road alignment changes that came in the 1920s–1950s:

- Spring Street realignment north of First Street to run parallel to Main Street
- Temple Street extension eastward from Main Street
- Creation of the US-101 Freeway and its service roads, called Arcadia and Aliso streets, but not exactly in the positions of the old Arcadia and Aliso streets

== Overview of the area ==
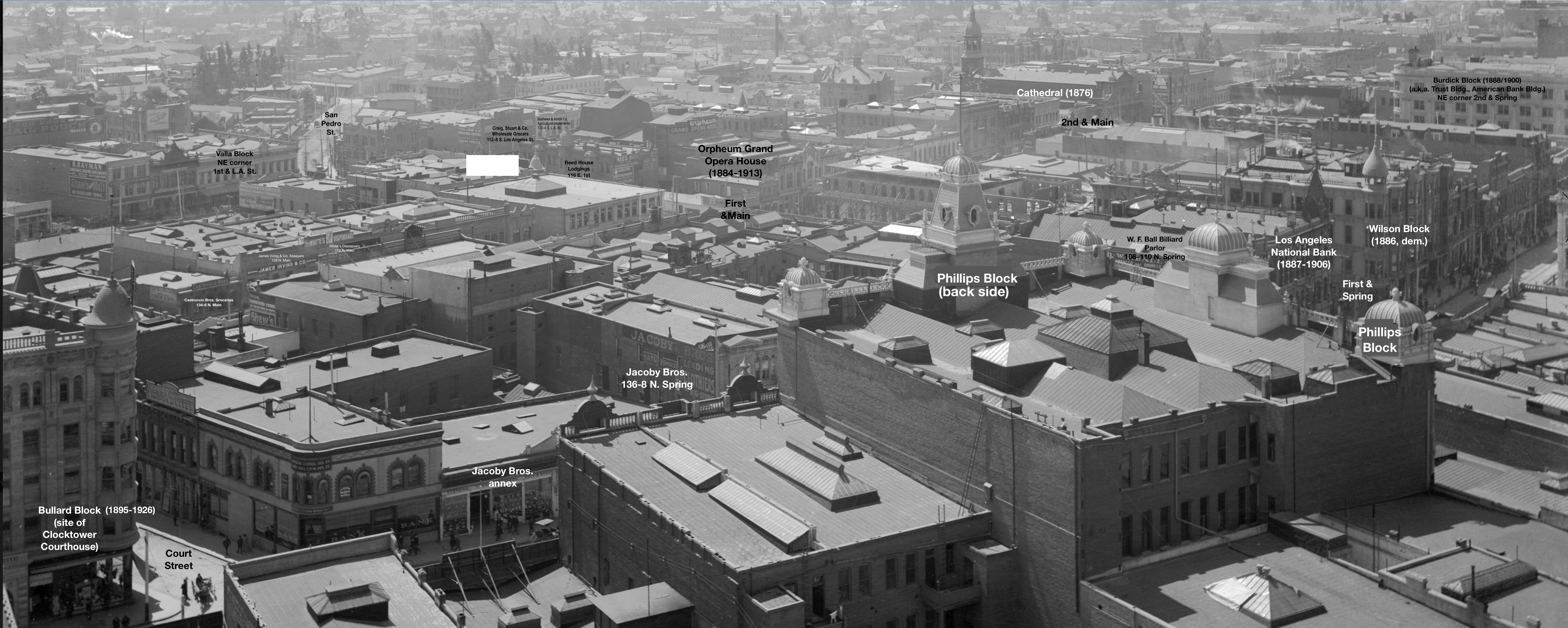
William Henry Jackson panoramic photo of Los Angeles business district, c.1900-1902. The view stretches from the Bullard Block just south of Temple and Spring (left, bottom) to the Burdick Block at 2nd and Spring, right. Portions of Main Street and Los Angeles Street are visible behind. The vast majority of the buildings in this view have been demolished. Today, about half of the area in view is City Hall and its grounds, and most of the rest of the area is home to other buildings in the Civic Center district.

== Buildings ==
=== Broadway ===
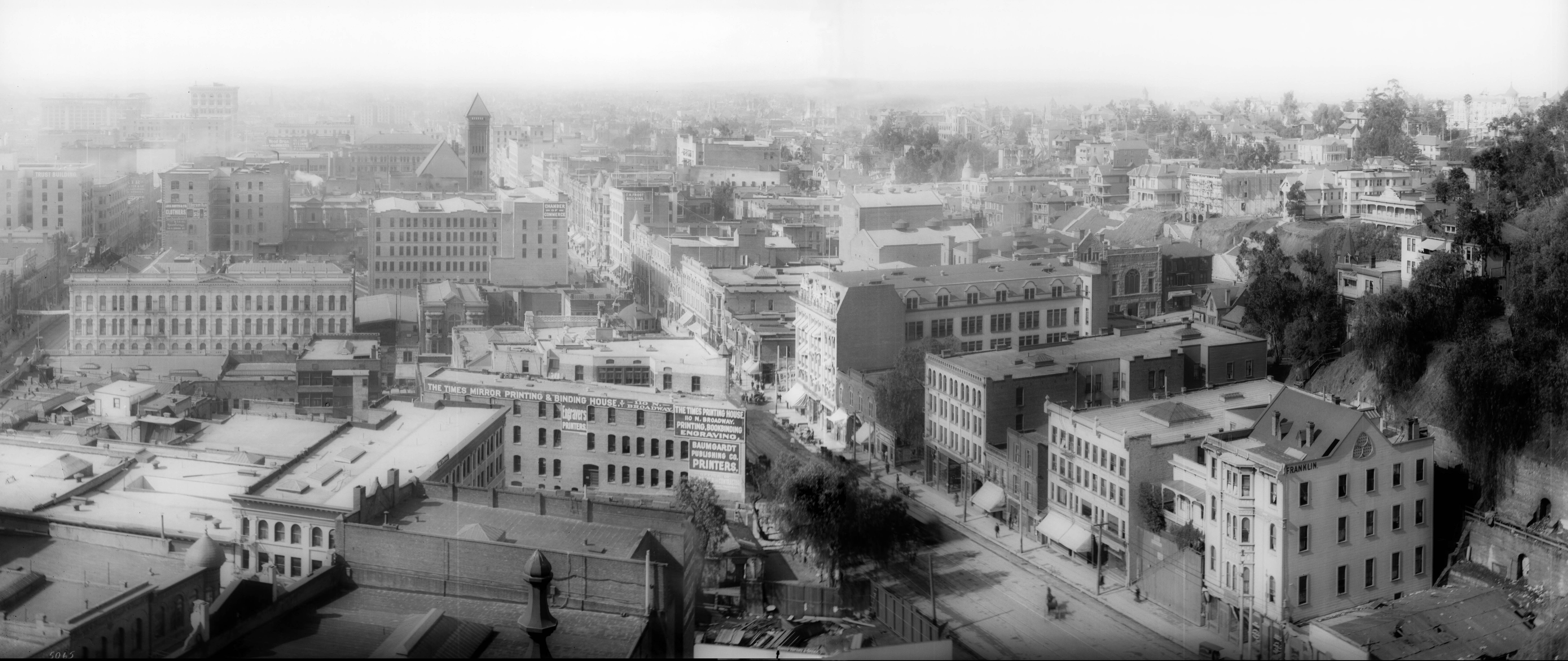
1905 view south on Broadway from Temple. Times Mirror printing house in foreground, marked 110 N. Broadway. The 1888 City Hall towers on Broadway's 200 block in the distance. Fort Moore Hill, now leveled, at right.

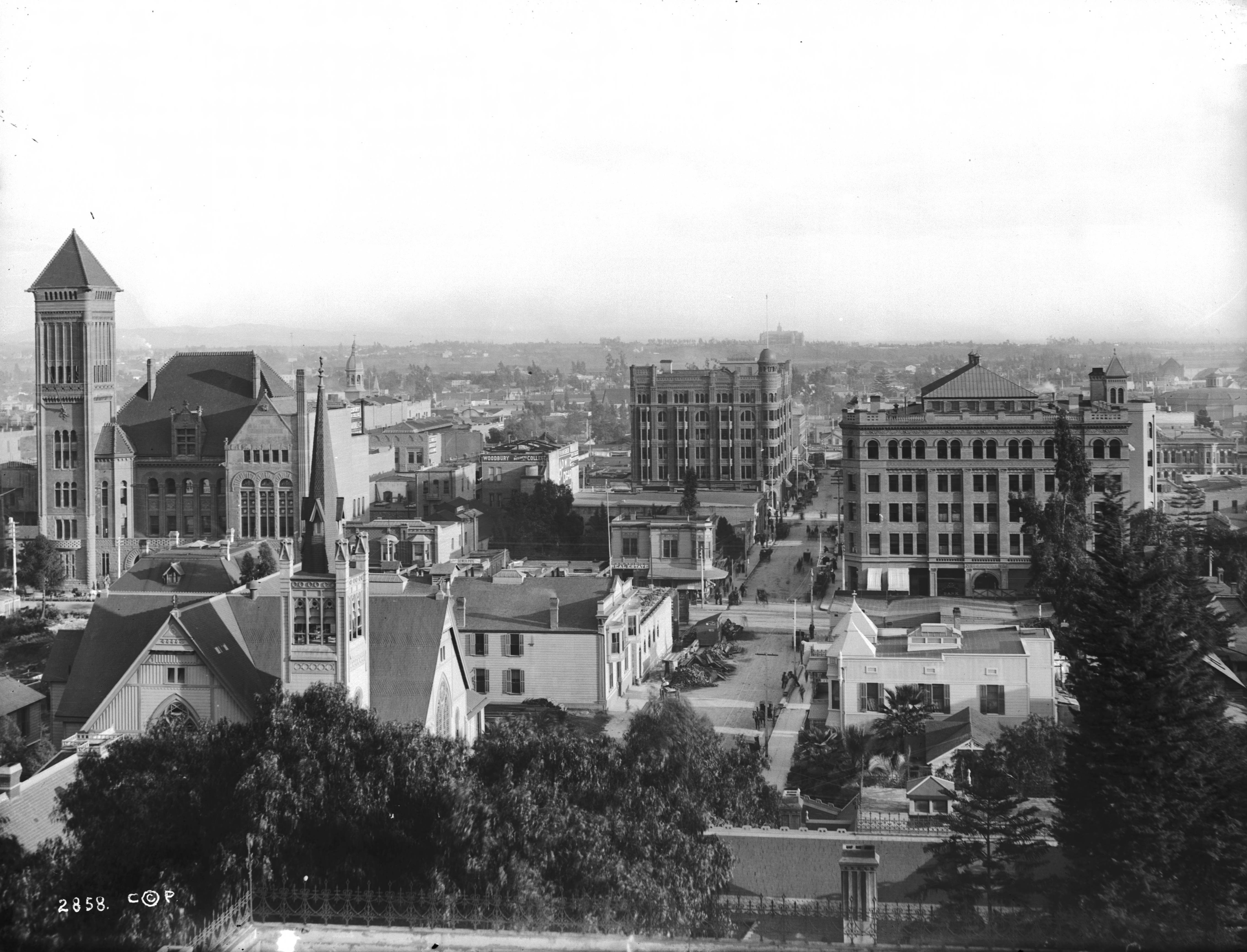
c.1893–1900, looking east at Broadway along Third from Bunker Hill

=== Temple and Broadway ===
Cable cars of the Temple Street Cable Railway ran along Temple Street starting in 1886 and were replaced with Pacific Electric streetcars in 1902.

==== Northwest corner ====
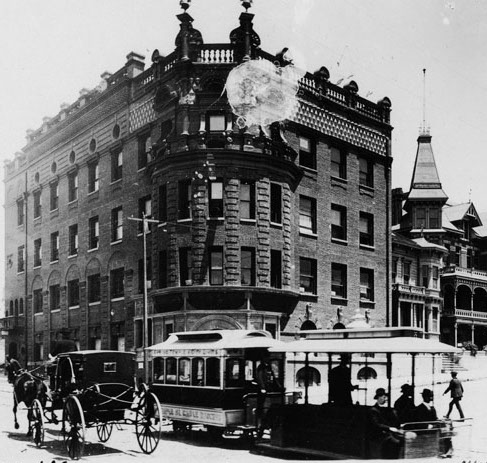
Women's Christian Temperance Union Temple, 1890
- The three-story brick Women's Christian Temperance Union building was erected in 1888 for $45,000. Also known as the Temperance Temple, it has been demolished and was replaced in 1957 by the Los Angeles County Central Heating and Refrigeration Plant.

==== Southeast corner ====
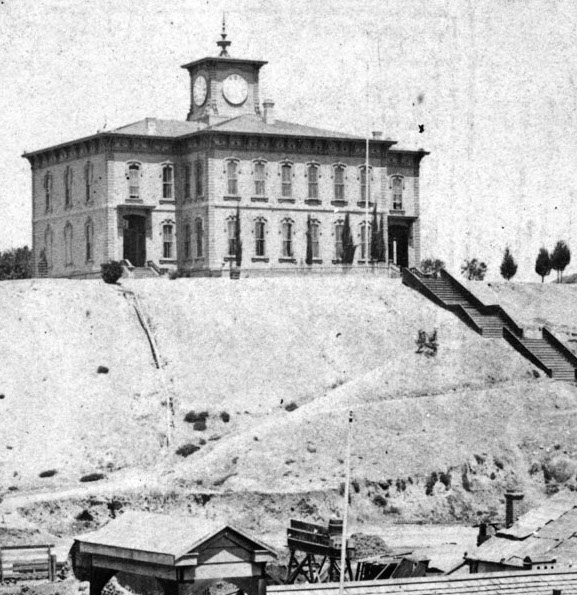
Los Angeles High School on Pound Cake Hill, 1870s

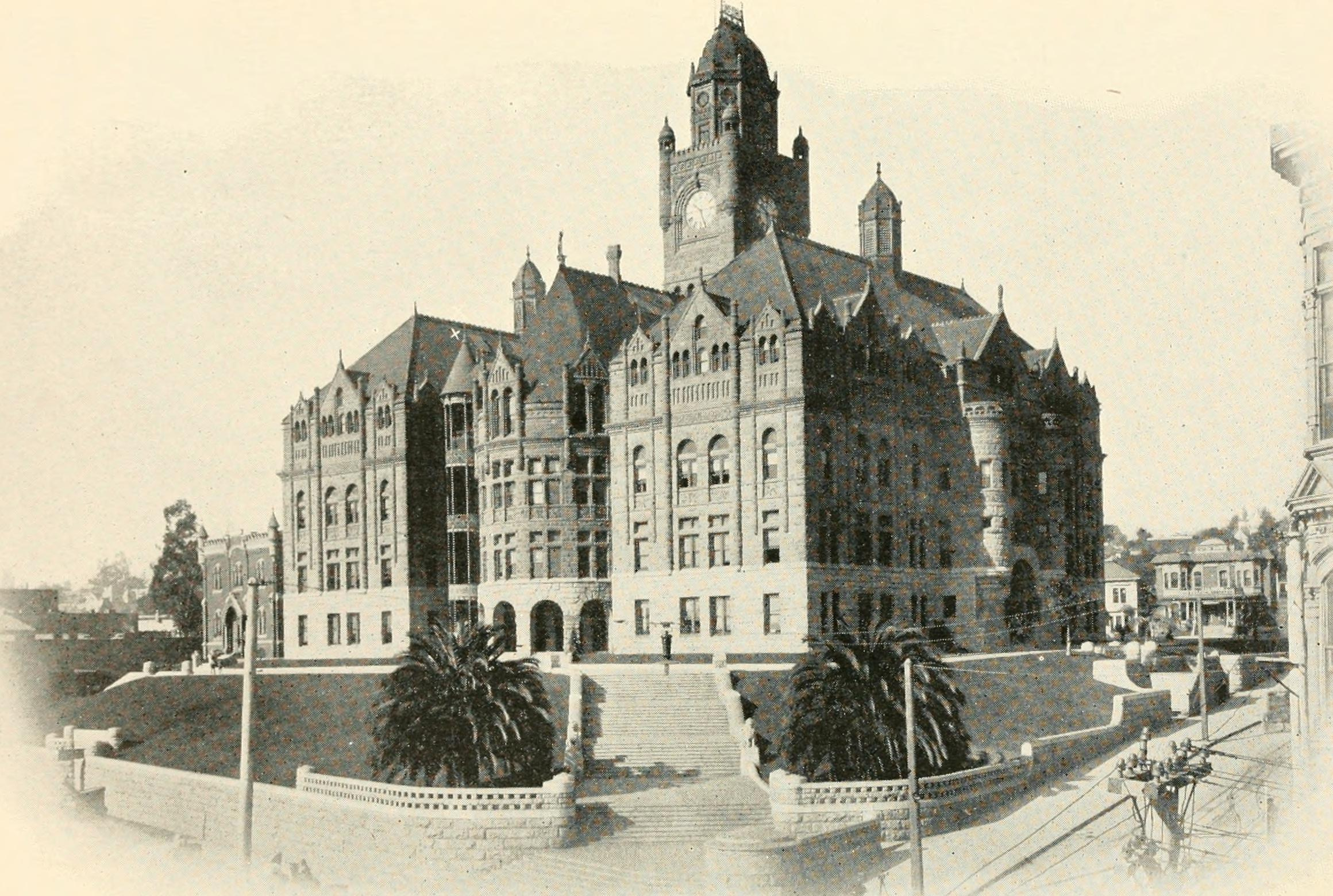
"Red Stone" Courthouse and Post Office (1891-1936)

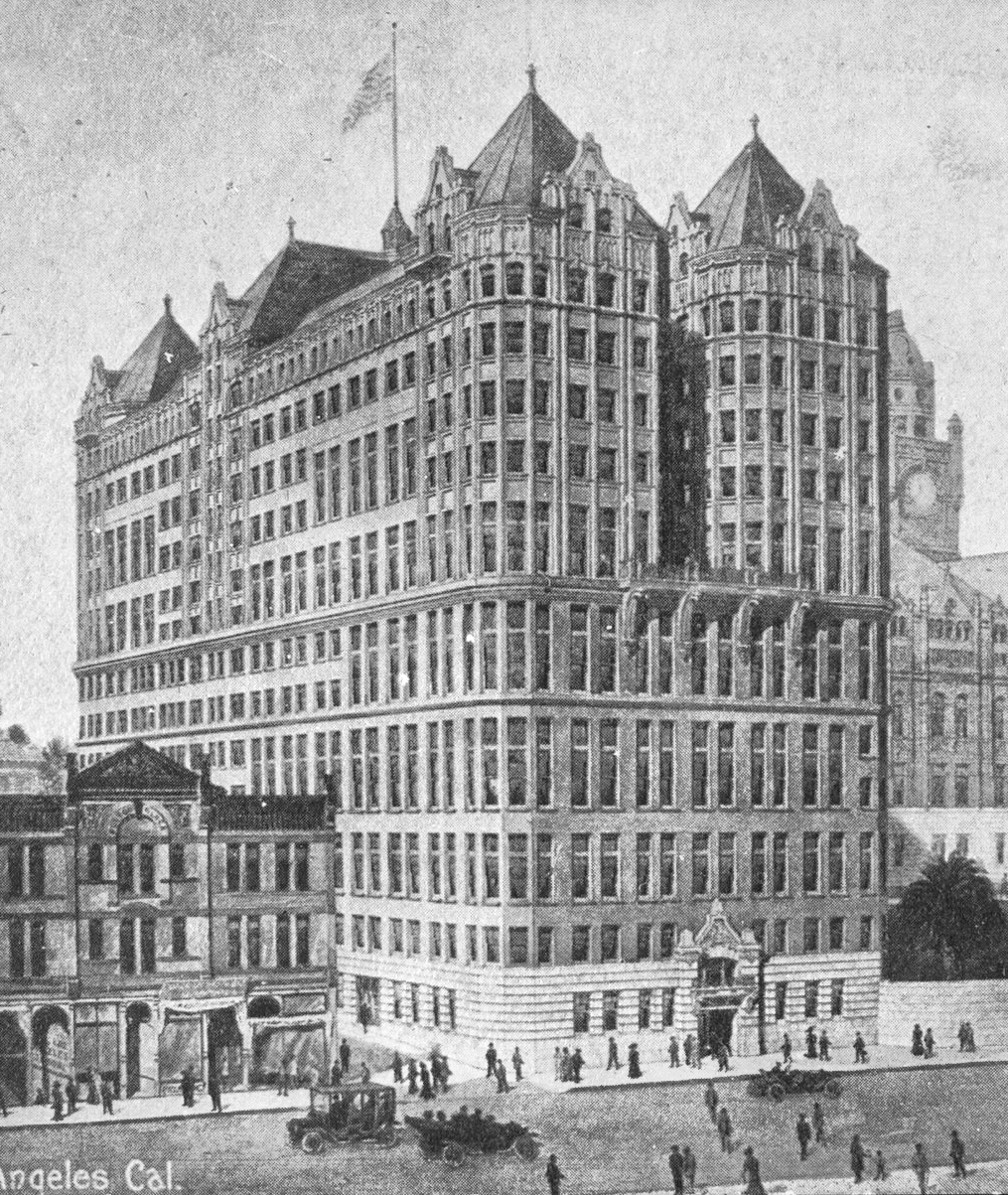
Hall of Records (1911–1973)

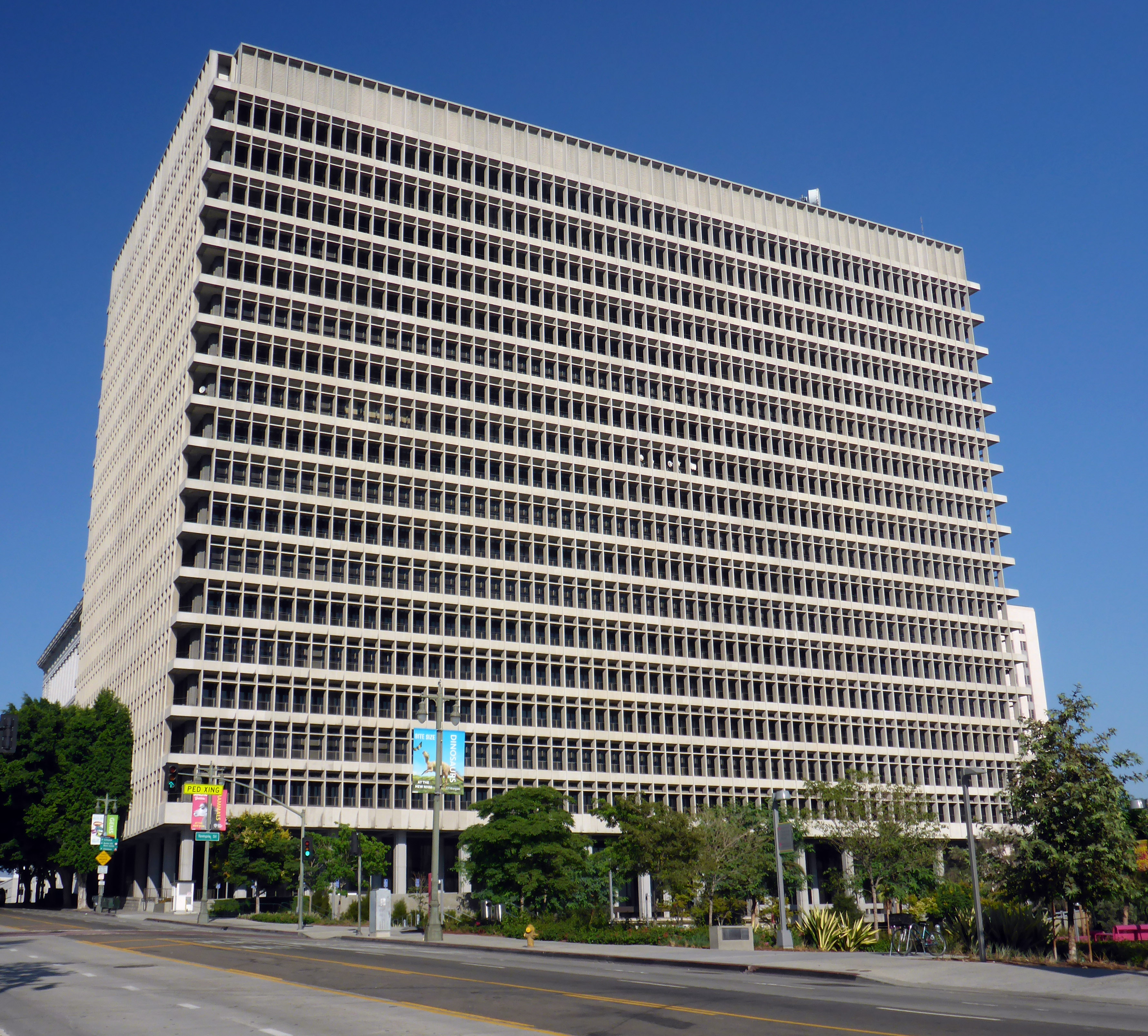
Clara Shortridge Foltz courthouse

This location was at the time known as Pound Cake Hill. The buildings located here faced New High Street to their east and Broadway to their west. They were as follows:

- Los Angeles High School, whose original location (1873-1887) was between New High on the west and Broadway on the east, south of Temple Street. It was moved to California and Sand streets, and in 1890 a new facility was built on Fort Moore Hill, immediately north of where Broadway today crosses the Hollywood Freeway. The Pound Cake Hill school was demolished and replaced by:
- First, the Red Stone Courthouse (or "Red Sandstone Courthouse"), which took over the function of courthouse from the Clocktower Courthouse (also called the Temple Courthouse). It was damaged beyond repair by the Long Beach earthquake of 1933 and was torn down in 1936.
- The Los Angeles County Hall of Records (1911) was built next to (south of) the Red Sandstone Courthouse in 1911. The building was deemed unsafe after the 1971 San Fernando earthquake and was demolished in 1973.

Currently on the site are:

- Clara Shortridge Foltz Criminal Justice Center (Los Angeles County Grand Jury), originally known as the Criminal Courts Building, opened in 1972
- A portion of Grand Park, which stretches mid-block between Temple and First, from City Hall at Spring Street, to the Music Center at Grand Avenue.

==== Southwest corner ====
- The second location of the Los Angeles County Hall of Records, opened 1962.

Adjacent to the south, mid-block, is a portion of Grand Park.

=== First and Broadway ===
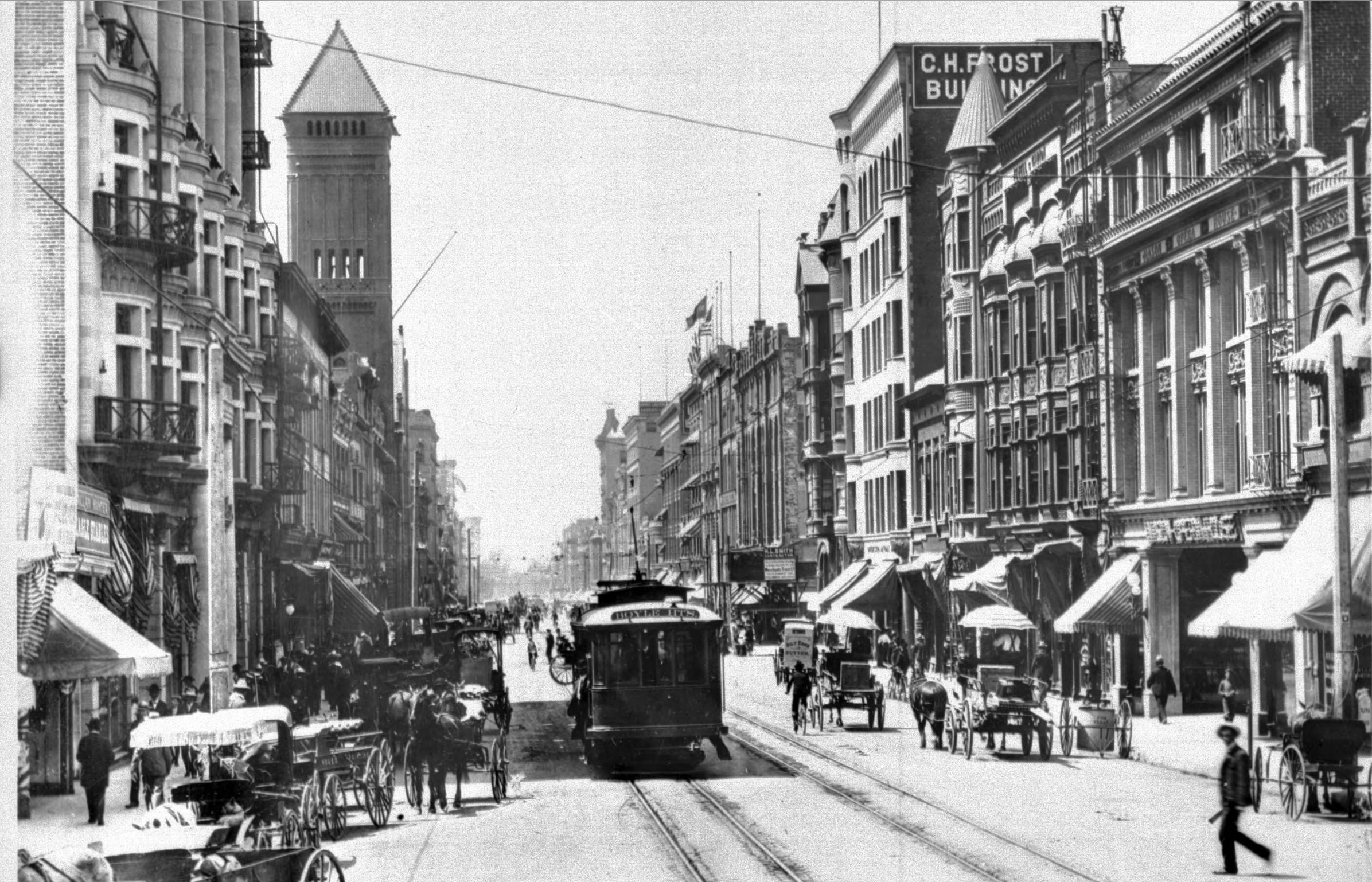
Looking south along Broadway from First, 1904-5. At right, from left to right: C.H. Frost Building, 141-3, the turreted Roanoke Bldg, Newell & Gammon Bldg., Mason Opera House. At left, Chamber of Commerce, 1888 City Hall.

==== Northeast corner ====
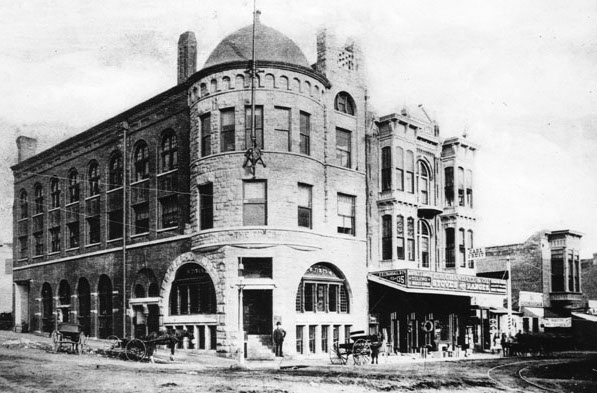
Los Angeles Times Building, 1886
- Los Angeles Times building, 1886. This building was razed after a 1910 bombing and a new headquarters was opened on this site in 1912. The newspaper later moved further south on Spring Street to the Los Angeles Times building, now part of Times Mirror Square, occupying the entire block between Broadway, Spring, First and Second streets.

==== Northwest corner ====
- Site of the Tajo Building (1896–mid-20th c.). Now the location of the Los Angeles County Law Library.

==== Southeast corner and east side of 100 block ====
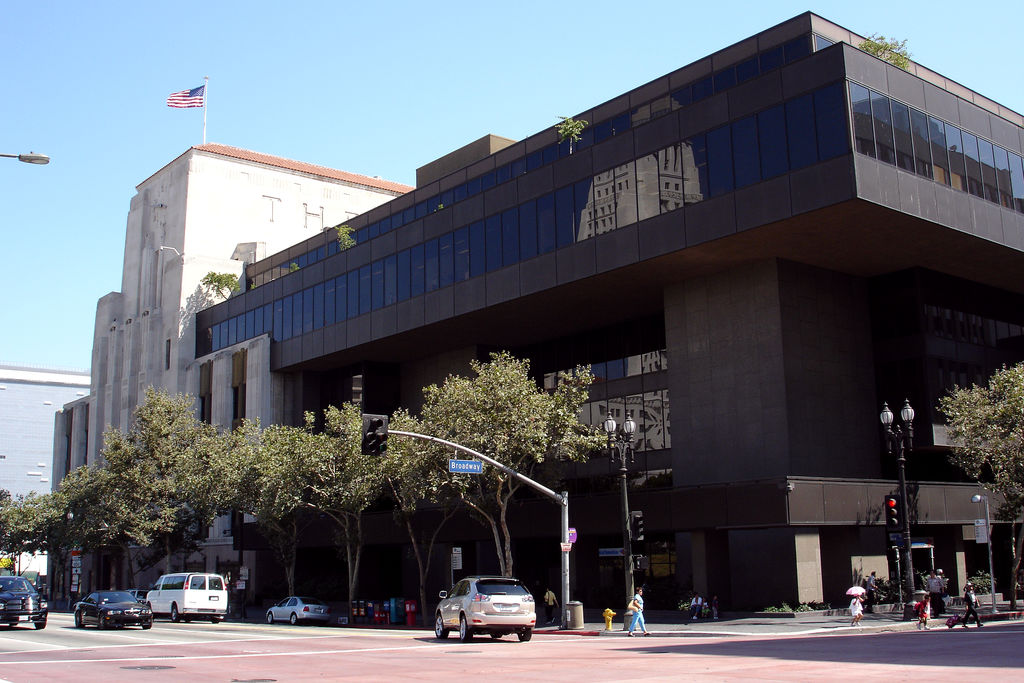
Times Mirror Square 1973 Pereira addition

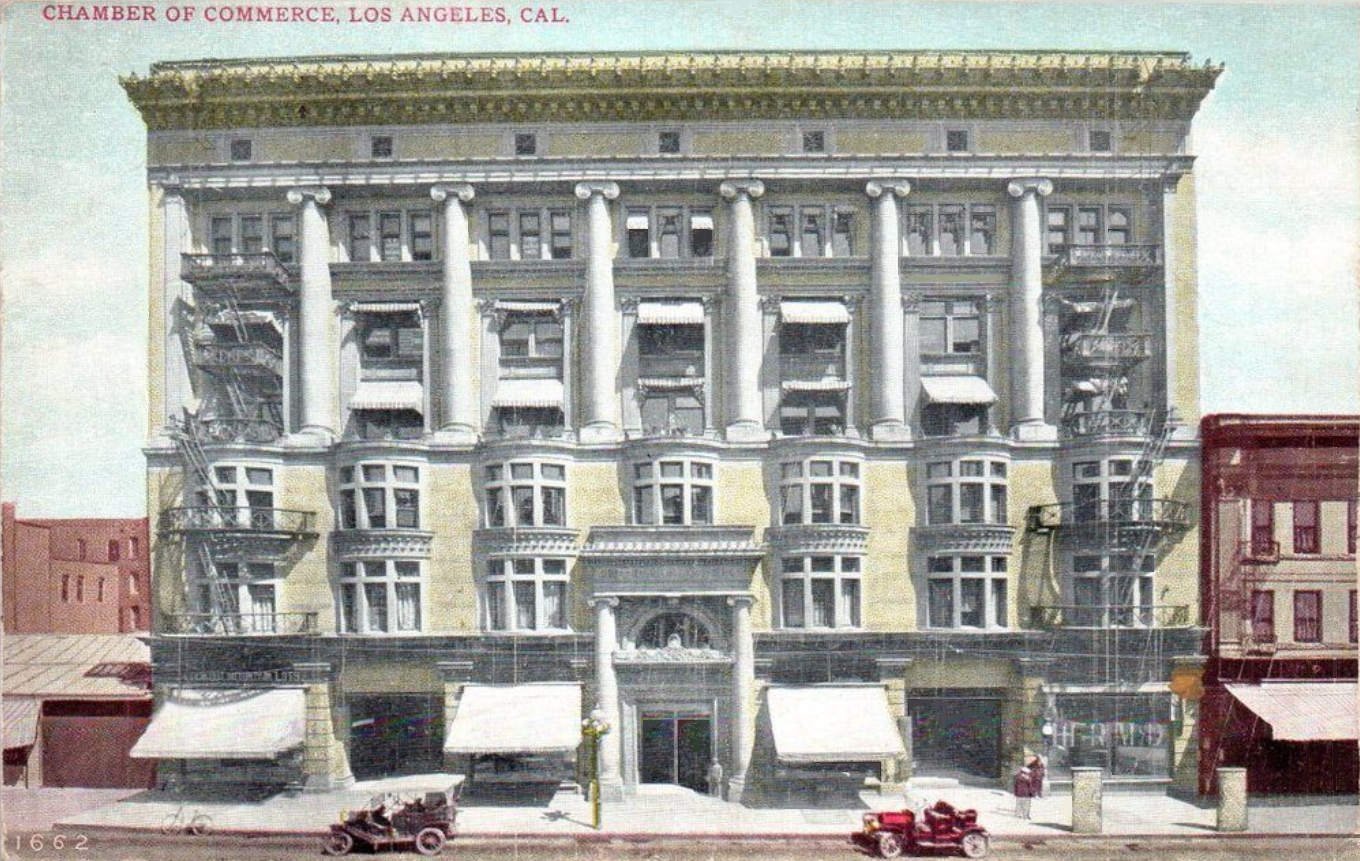
Postcard c.1910 of Chamber of Commerce
- Site of the Culver Block retail and office building. Now the site of the Times Mirror Square 1973 Pereira Addition, so called because it was designed by William Pereira.
- South of the Culver Block was the Los Angeles Chamber of Commerce Building, 128–130 S. Broadway, opened February 12, 1904, a landmark at the time featured on postcards and in books. 6 stories, 4 floors. Ground floor offices included those of the Los Angeles Herald and Consolidated Bank.

==== Southwest corner ====
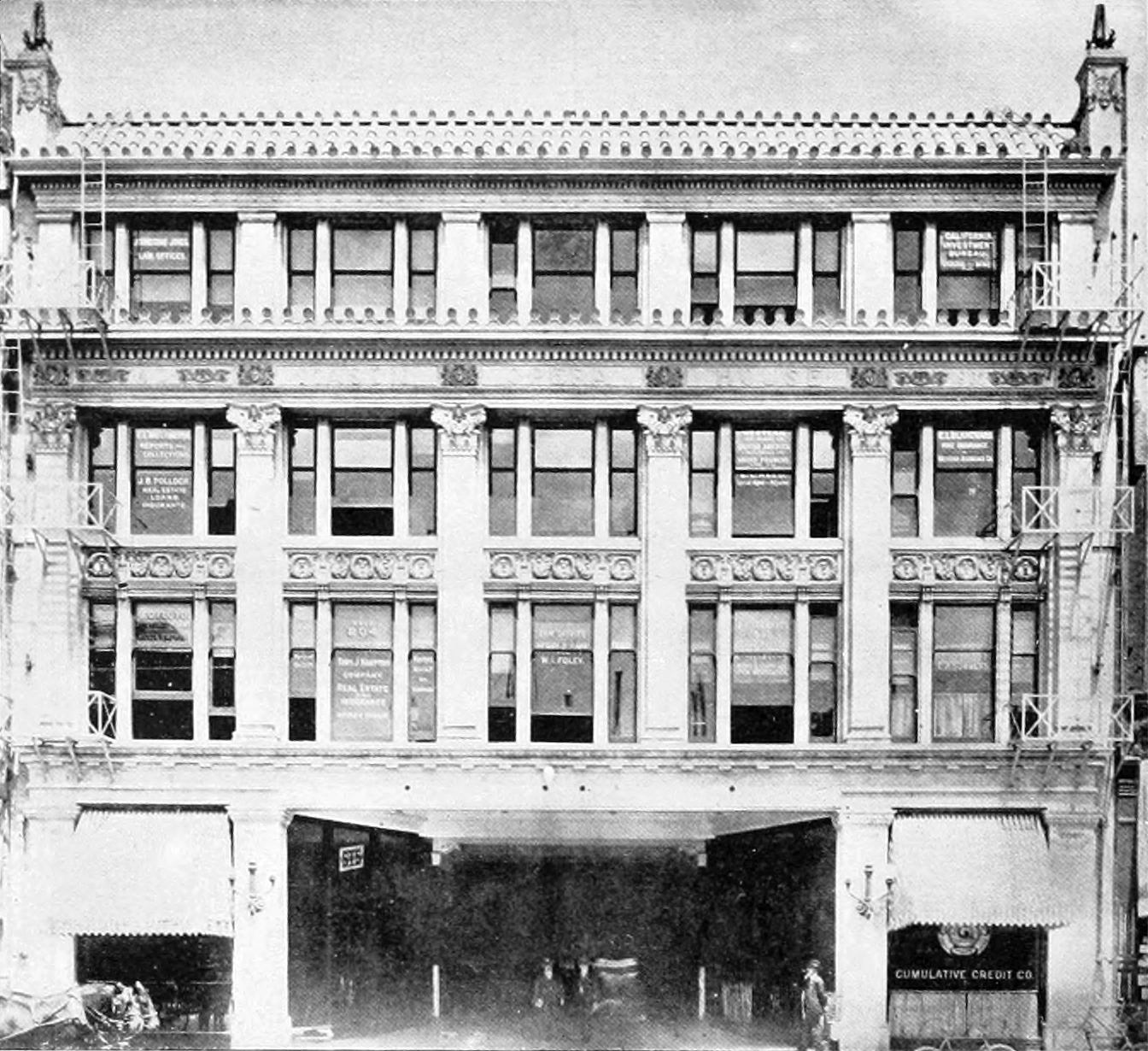
Mason Opera House

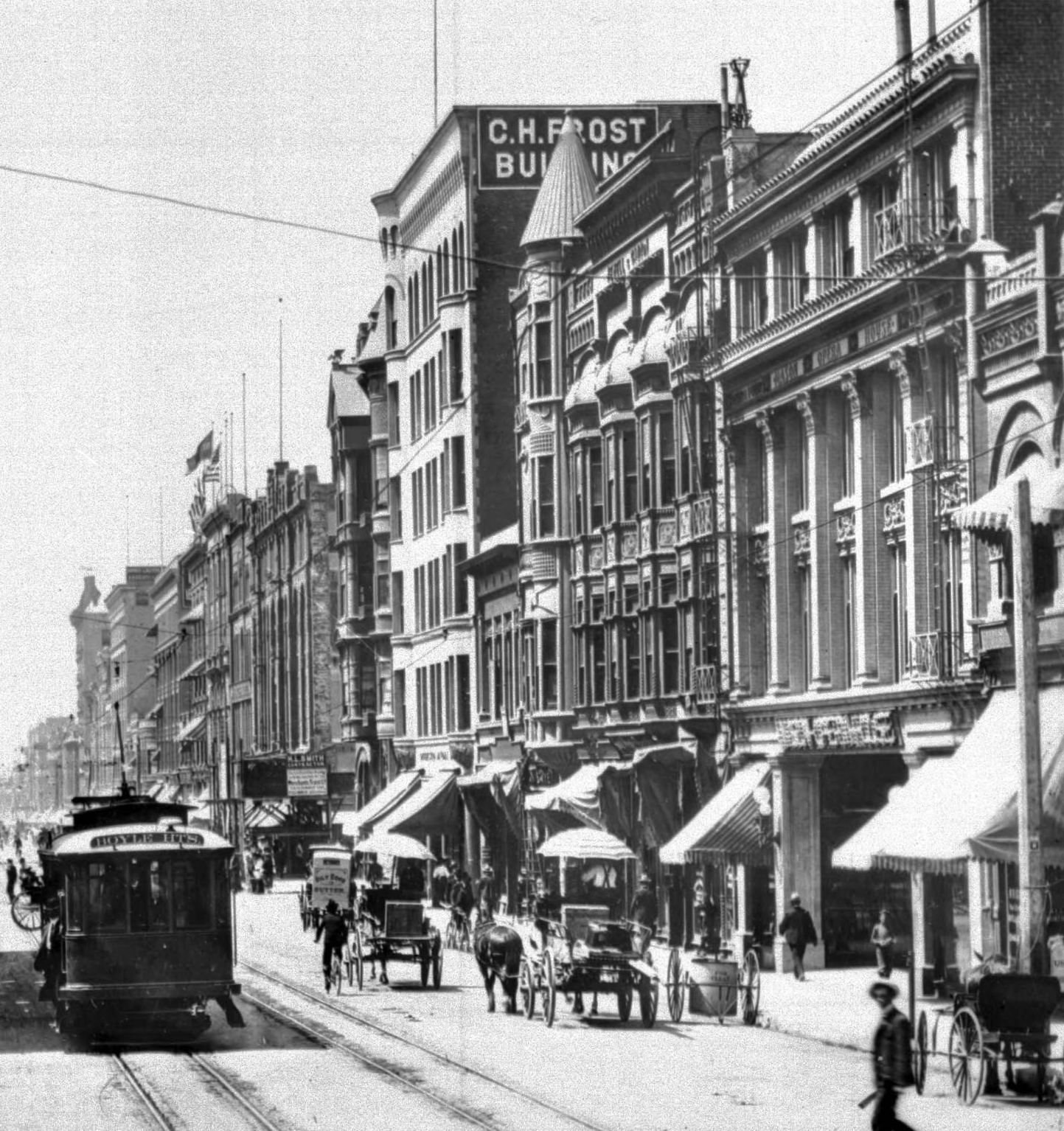
From left to right: C.H. Frost Building, Roanoke Bldg., Newell & Gammon Bldg., and Mason Opera House

The southwest corner, during Victorian times the site of unremarkable retail and office buildings, was from 1958 the location of the State Office Building, (1958-60, architect Anson C. Boyd, razed 2006). It was named the Junipero Serra State Office Building, and this moniker would be transferred to the former Broadway Department Store building at 4th and Broadway when it was opened to replace this building in 1998. It is now the location of the New U.S. Courthouse built in 2016, taking up the entire block between Broadway, Hill, First and Second.

Just south of the southwest corner was the Mason Theatre, 127 S. Broadway. Opened in 1903 as the Mason Opera House, 1,600 seats. Benjamin Marshall of the Chicago firm Marshall & Wilson designed the building in association with John Parkinson. Marshall is known for designing the Iroquois Theatre in Chicago. Remodeled in 1924 by Meyer & Holler. Later, as the Mason Theatre, it showed Spanish-language films. Demolished 1955.

145 S. Broadway,site of the C. H. Frost Building, later known as the Haig M. Prince Building. Built 1898, architect John Parkinson, Now the location of the new United States Courthouse built in 2016, taking up the entire block between Broadway, Hill, First and Second.

=== Second and Broadway ===
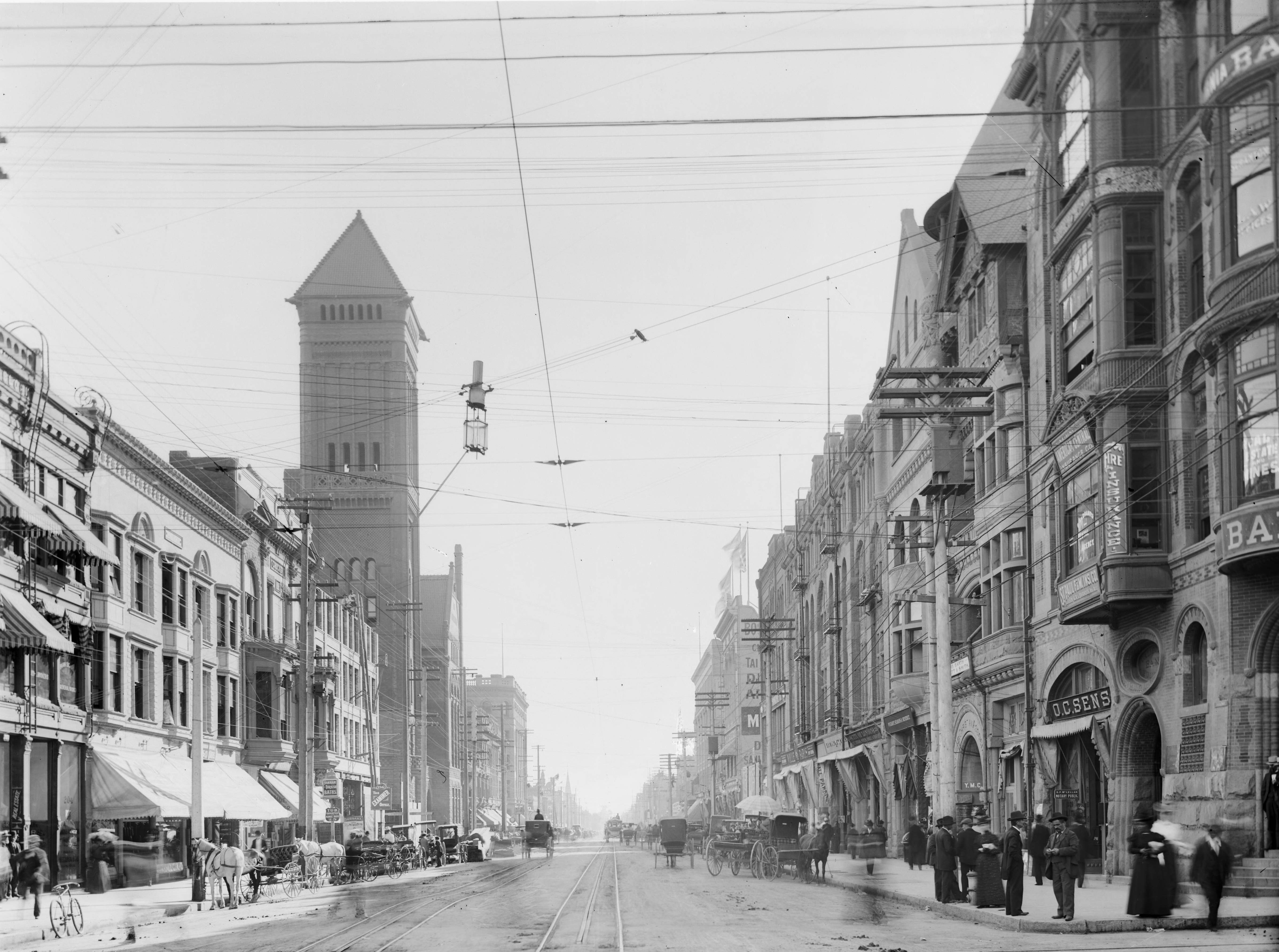
Broadway looking south from 2nd, 1895-1905

==== Northeast corner ====
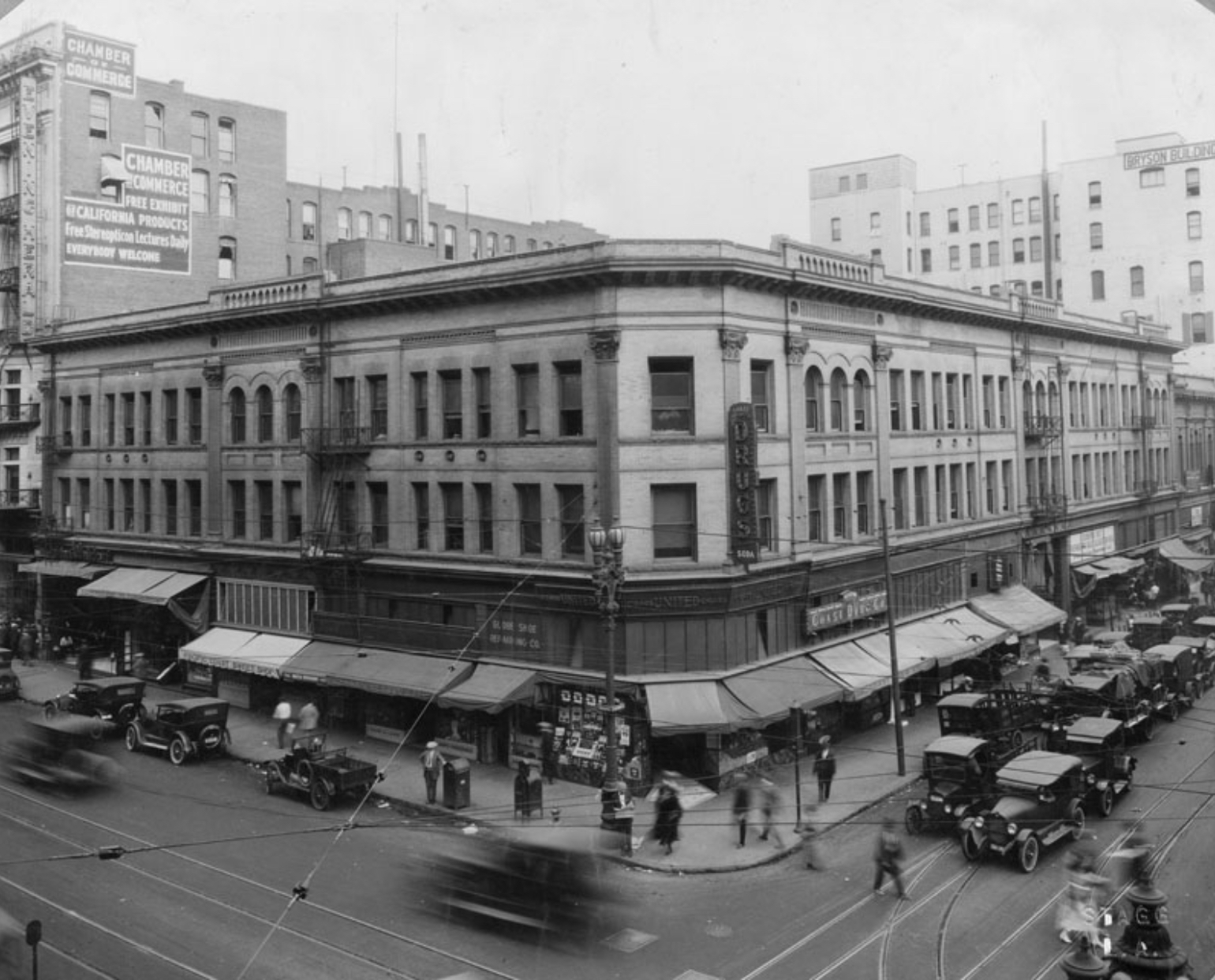
Hellman Building, 1918

One of several Hellman Buildings across Downtown L.A. — not to be confused with the still-existing Hellman Building at Fourth and Spring — was located here (#138) from 1897 to 1959. The site is now a parking structure, part of the Times Mirror Square complex.

==== Southwest corner and west side of 200 block ====
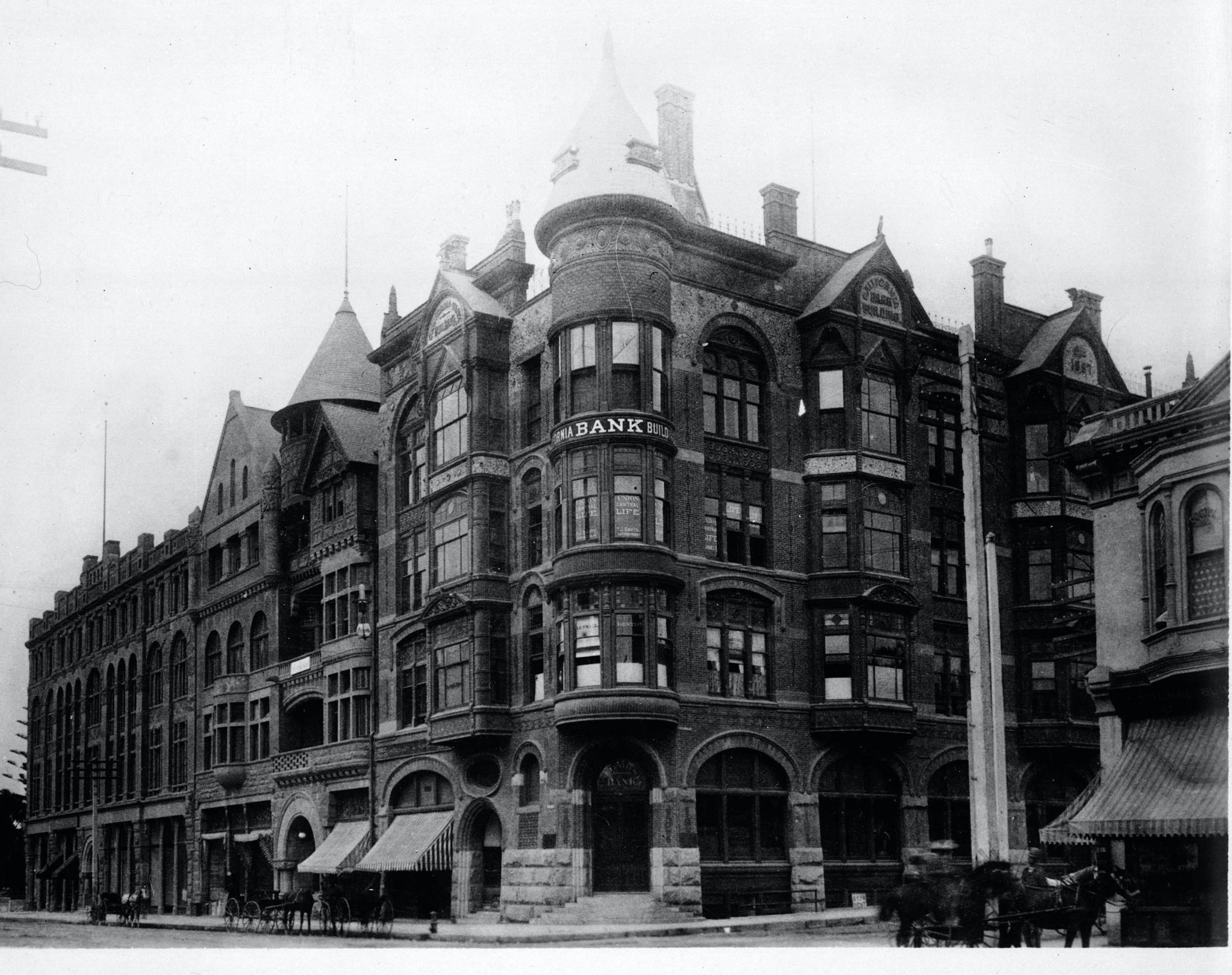
American National Bank Building, southwest corner, 1890. To the left are the turret and two gables of the YMCA Building (1889), then the Potomac Block (1890)

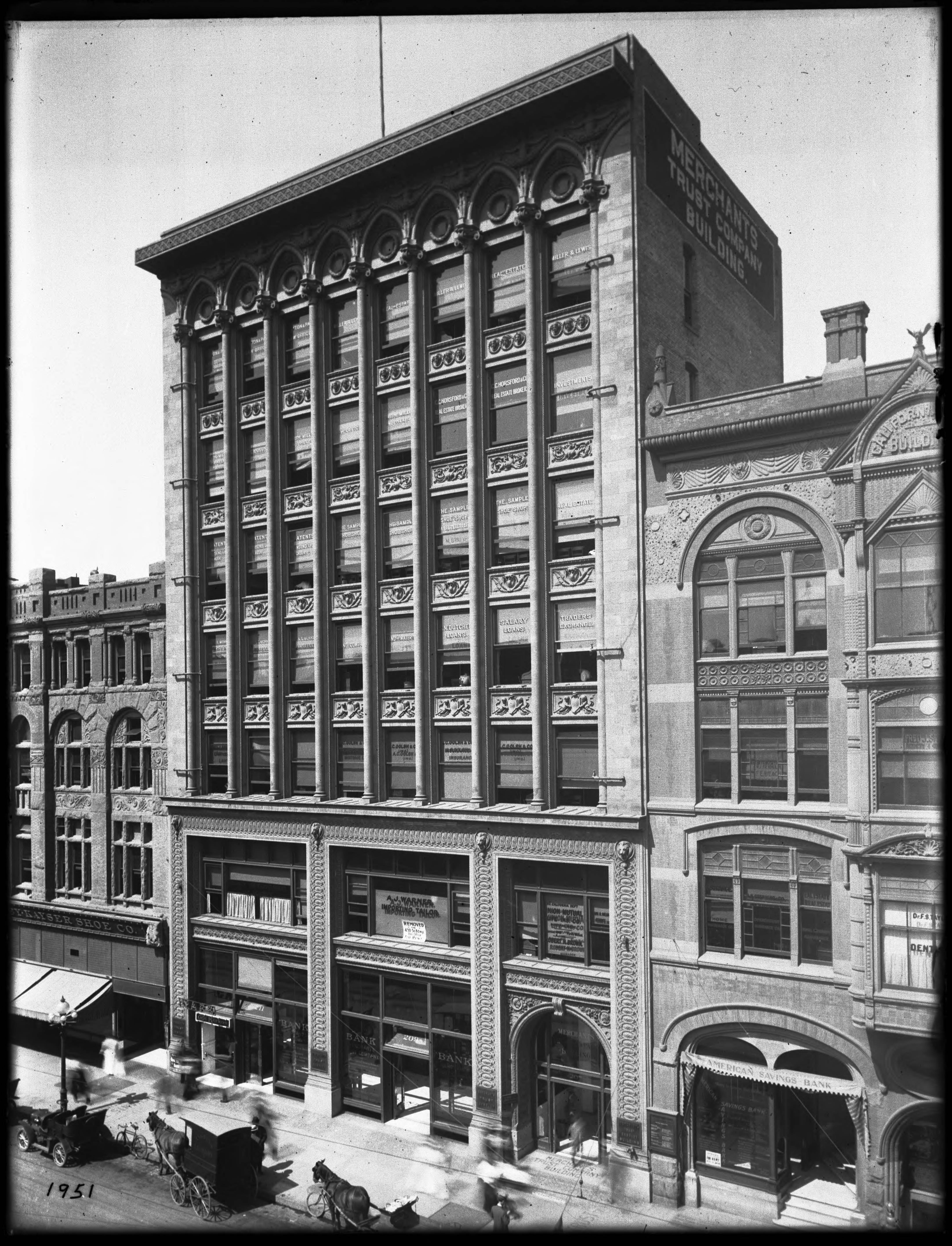
Merchants Trust Company Building, 1910

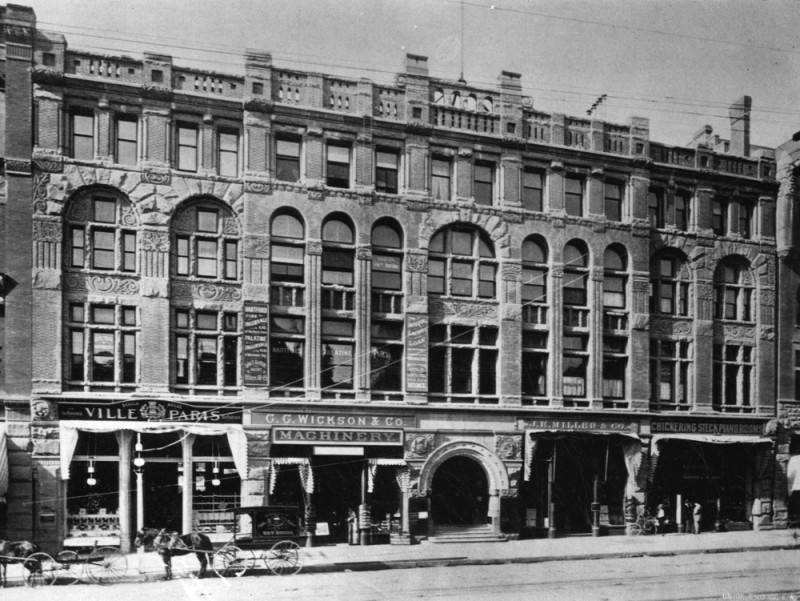
Potomac Block c.1890-1895

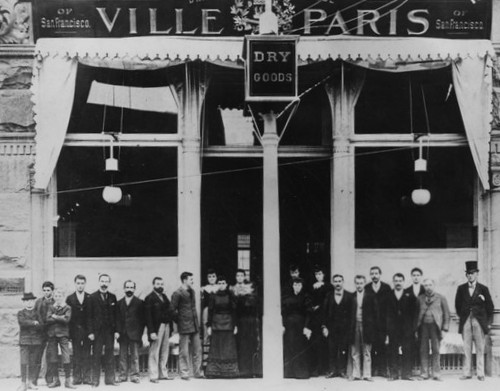
Ville de Paris department store, 1901

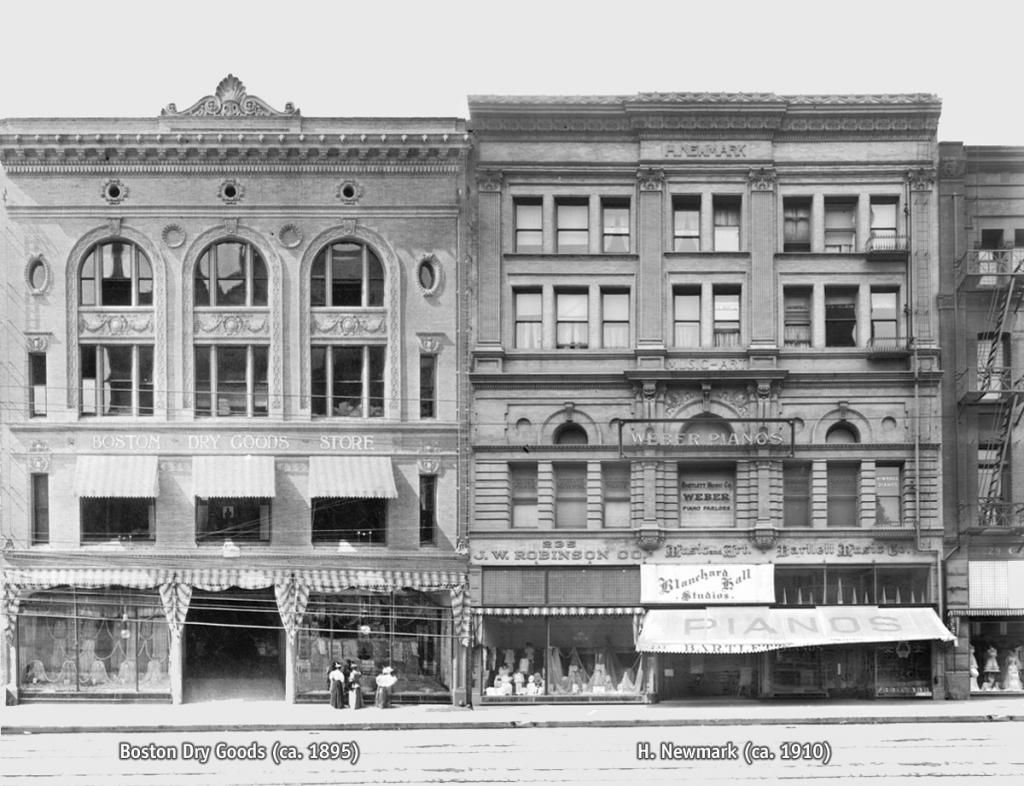
Boston Dry Goods and Harris Newmark buildings(Blanchard Hall), 1899

The west side of the 200 block of South Broadway had a key place in the retail history of Los Angeles from the 1893 through 1917, as it was home to several prominent early department stores such as the Ville de Paris, Coulter's department store from 1905–1917, and J. W. Robinson's "Boston Dry Goods" store from 1895–1915. All three stores would move to Seventh Street when it became the upscale shopping street between 1915 and 1917.

- On the southwest corner of 2nd and Broadway was Judge O'Melveny's house, built in 1870. This was replaced by the American National Bank (later California Bank) Building, which in turn was replaced by the California Building in 1911. Nos. 201-213 Broadway are now known as the Broadway Media Center.

Further south on the west side of Broadway, was 207–211, location of the:

- YMCA Building (#207–209–211), Romanesque Revival architecture, opened in July 1889, demolished in 1903.
  - The YMCA operated here at #207 from 1889 until 1903,
  - City of London opened here in August 1891, run by Messrs. Hiles and Niccolls, who came from the City of Paris department store. It carried curtains, window shades, comforters, and the like. It operated here until August 1895, when it moved next door to the Potomac Block at #213.

The YMCA Building was demolished to make way for the:

- Merchants Trust Co. Building.

===== Coulter's complex =====
The adjacent Potomac Block and Bicknell Block originally housed prominent retailers of the day, then were joined together in 1906 by Coulter's department store to form a complex, opening it as a new, 157,000 sq ft (14,600 m^{2}) store in June, 1905.

====== Potomac Block ======
The Potomac Block, 213–223 S. Broadway, was from 1905 to 1917 known as the B. F. Coulter Building. It was originally developed by lumberyard and mill owner J. M. Griffith. It was designed in 1888 by Block, Curlett and Eisen in Romanesque architectural style and opened on July 17, 1890.

Tenants included:

- Ville de Paris department store (at 221–223, from 1893 through 1906),
- City of London Dry Goods Co., which moved here from next door at #211 in August 1895 and advertised for this location through August 1899.

It was the first time major retail stores opened on South Broadway, in what would be a shift of the upmarket shopping district from 1890 to 1905 from around First and Spring to South Broadway. In 1904, Coulter's bought the Potomac Block, and combined it with the Bicknell block to create its new store that opened in 1905.

After Coulter's moved:

- 215 continued as a branch of Coulter's through 1927. Then, 215–217 was home to the Pacific Furniture House in the 1940s.
- 219 housed Fisch's Department Store in the 1940s.

The building was demolished in 1953 and is still the site of a parking lot.

====== Bicknell Block ======
The Bicknell Block (or Bicknell Building) at 225–229 S. Broadway, with back entrances at 224–228 S. Hill Street. was part of Coulter's from 1905 from 1917. After Coulter's moved in 1917, it housed the Western Shoe Co. (through 1922), later known as the Western Department Store (1922–1928). Lettering covered the face of the building from top to bottom through the end of the 1950s: "THE LARGEST SHOE DEPT. IN THE WEST".

===== Further south =====
- 231-235, the Harris Newmark Building, Blanchard Hall Music & Art Building 1899, Abram Edelman), Bartlett Music Co. (#233), annex to J. W. Robinson's (#235); Goodwill Industries store (#233-235, 1950s–60s). The building still stands, but all floors except the ground floor have been removed.
- 237-241, the Boston Dry Goods Building (completed 1895, demolished, architects Theodore Eisen and Sumner Hunt, designer of the Bradbury Building) The building was home to J. W. Robinson's "Boston Dry Goods" store from 1895 to 1915, Scott's Department Store (239–241, 1920s), Third Street Store (237–241, 1950s–60s). Demolished, currently the site of a parking lot.
- 251 was home to the I. Magnin speciality department store, which opened here on January 2, 1899; starting 1904, I. Magnin announced that the store would be known by the name of its manager, Myer Siegel.

==== Southeast corner and east side of 200 block ====
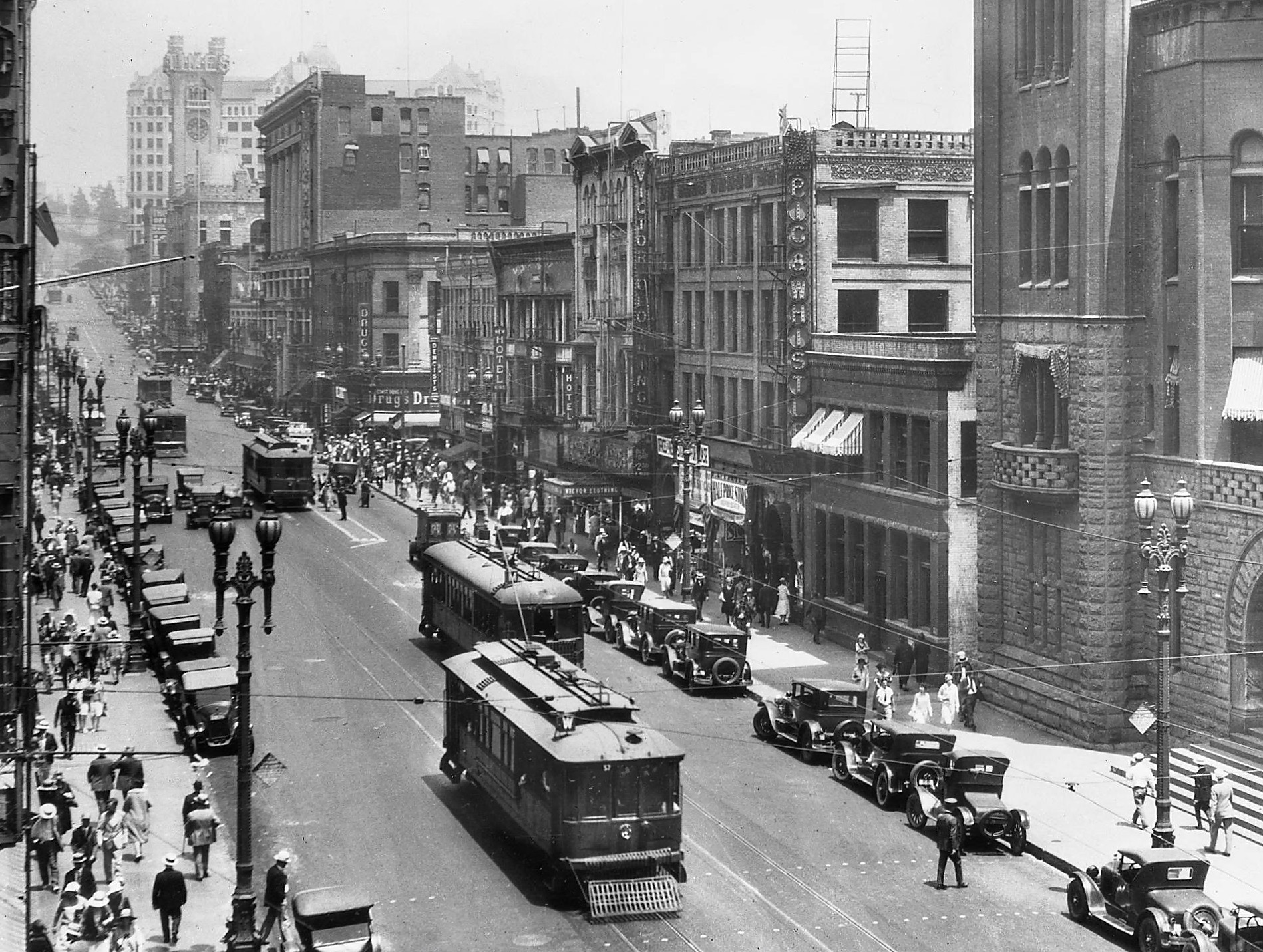
Looking north along Broadway, east side, past 2nd Street. From top left: Los Angeles Times Bldg., the 1911 Hall of Records behind it, the Chamber of Commerce Bldg., Hellman Bldg., Nolan, Smith and Bridge Bldg., Gordon Bldg., Crocker Bldg., Copp Bldg., 1888 City Hall
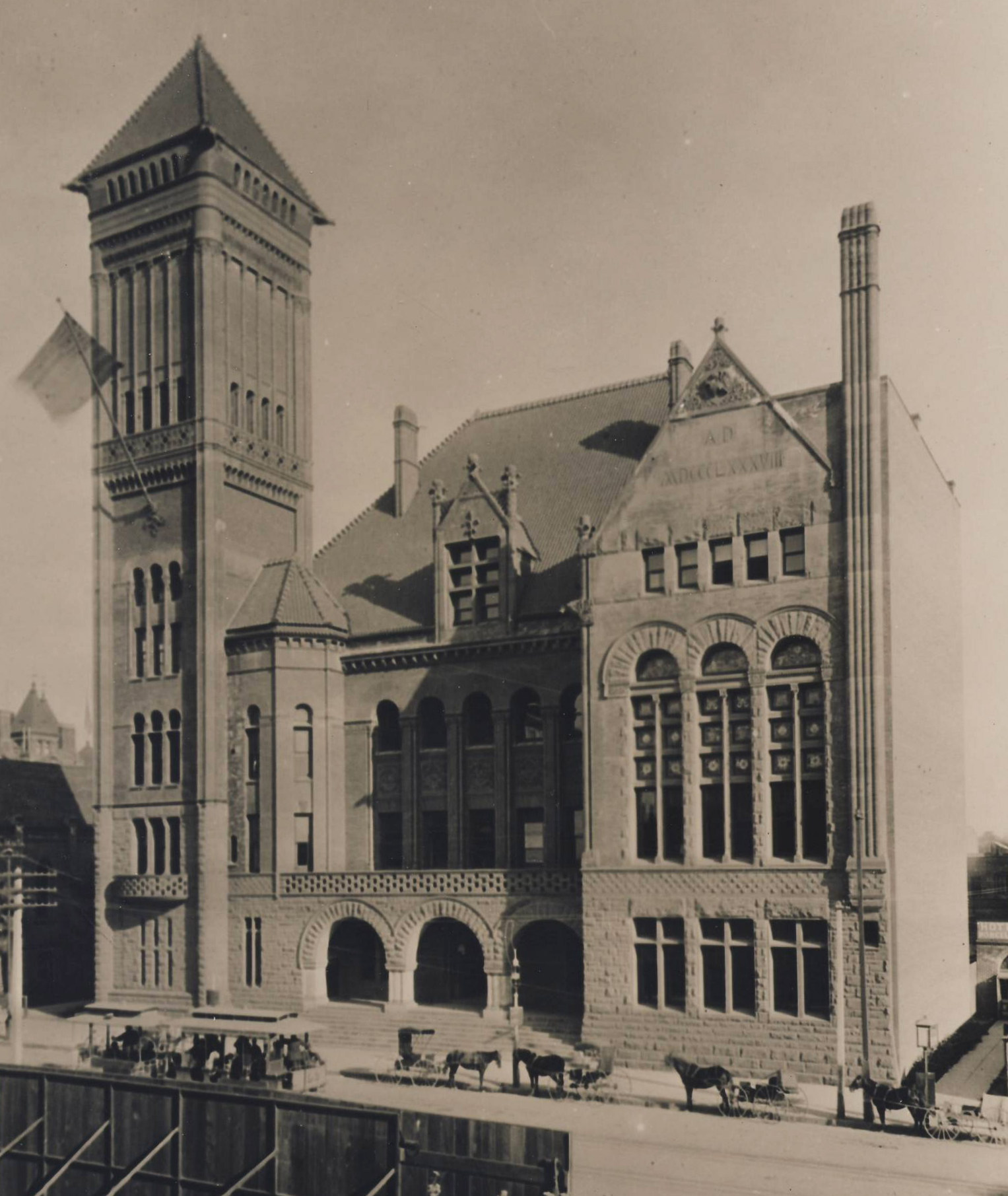
Los Angeles City Hall (1888–1928)

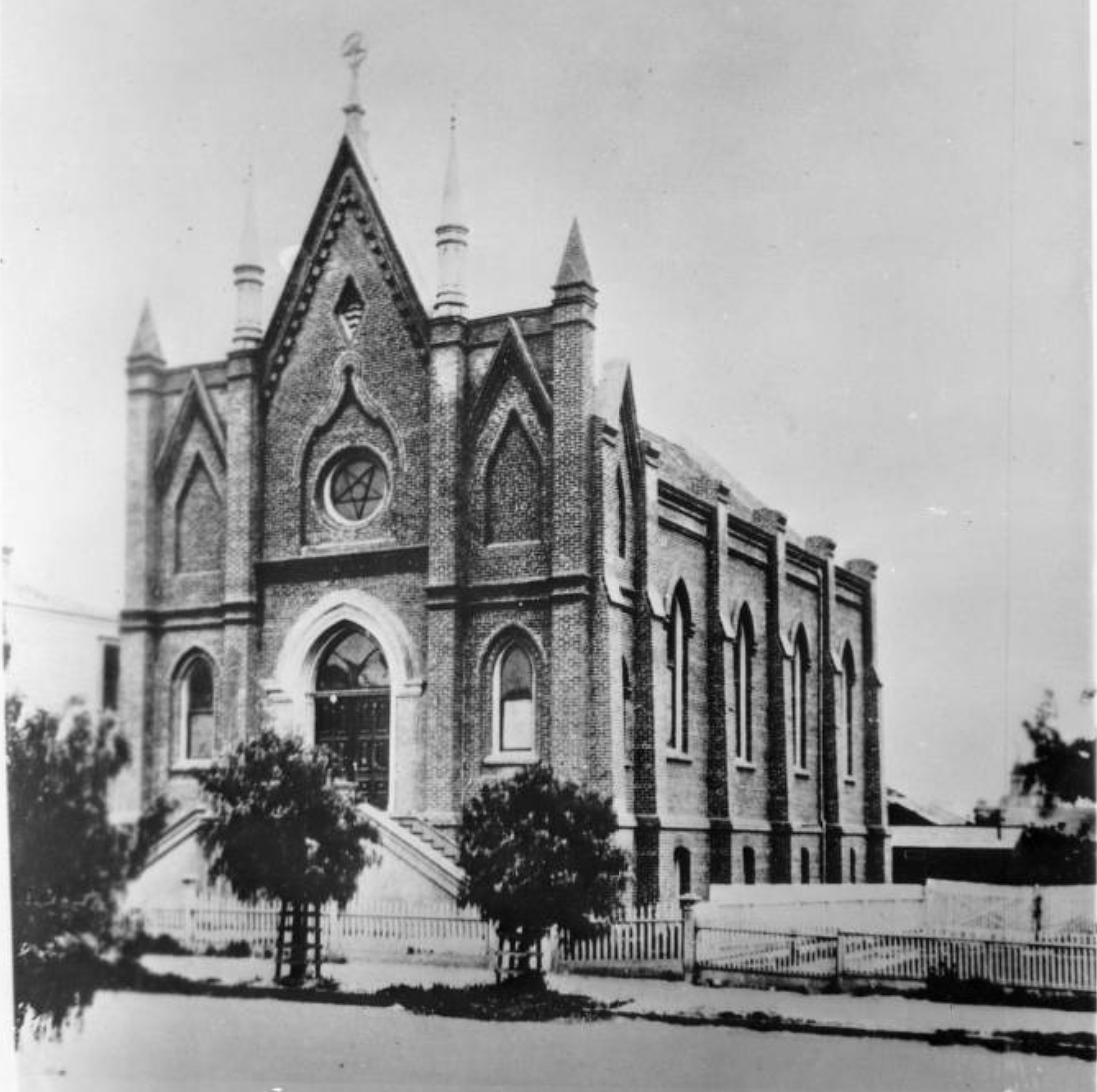
B'nai B'rith Temple (opened 1873)

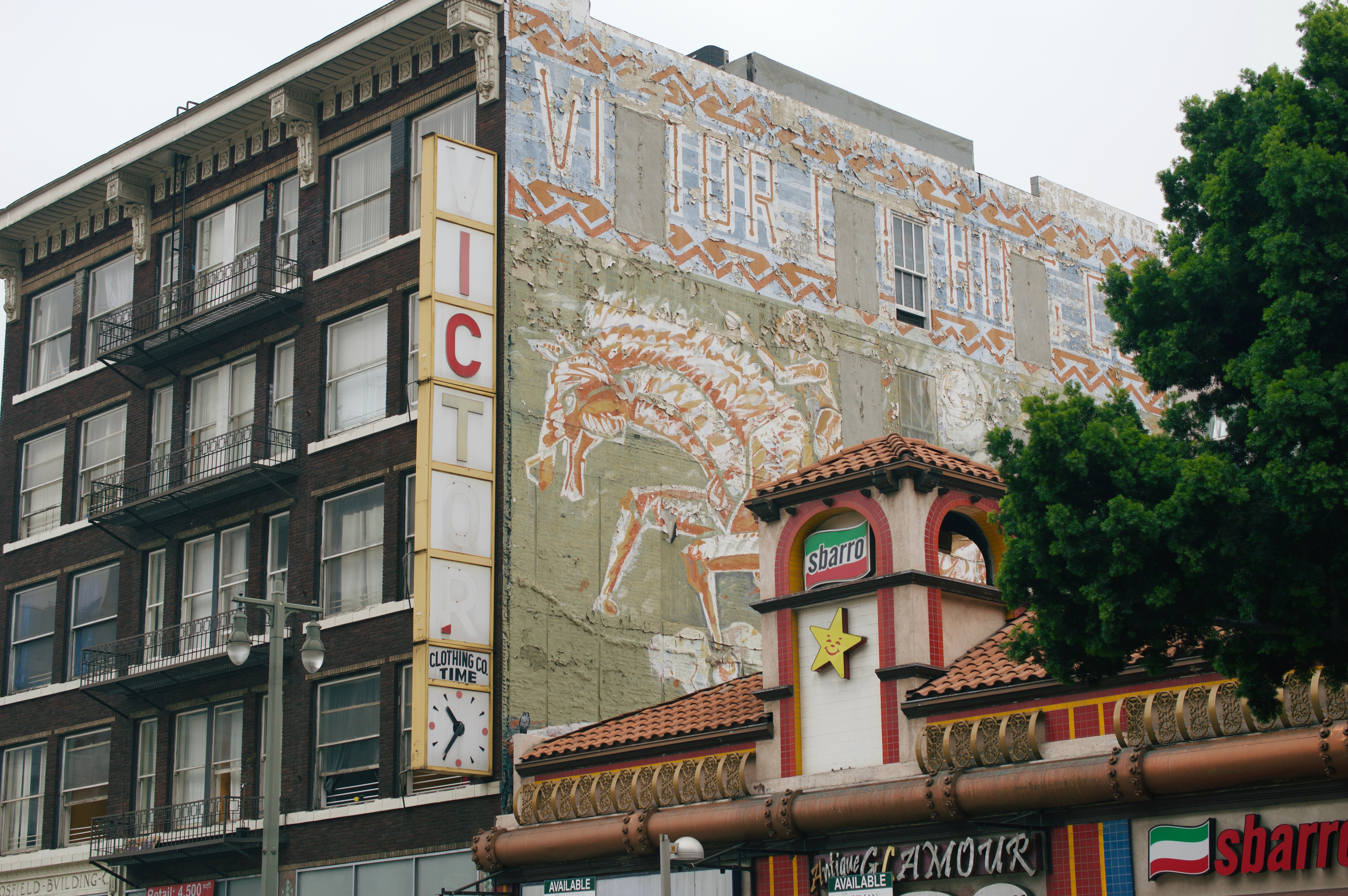
Victor Clothing Company Building

The southeast corner of 2nd and Broadway was the site of:

- First Presbyterian Church in 1894. The church was replaced sometime before 1906
- Nolan, Smith and Bridge Building, #200-4 S. Broadway, stores and a restaurant.
- Now the corner is the site of the Historic Broadway underground light rail station.

Mid-block were:

- Crocker Building, #212–6 Home to Victor Clothing from 1920 to 1964
- B'nai B'rith Temple (1873), 214 S. Broadway (post-1890 numbering), the city's first synagogue, razed to make way for the Copp Building, 218–224 S. Broadway, home to the original (1908) Pig 'n Whistle candy shop and tea room. The Pig 'n Whistle would open locations at 7th and Broadway and in Hollywood, where it would become a landmark restaurant that still operates today.
- City Hall (1888–1928; opened 1888, demolished 1929; 228–238 S. Broadway, architect Solomon Irmscher Haas, Romanesque Revival). Now a parking lot. Three stories, it had a 150-foot (46 m) campanile. Red and brown brick. Housed the Los Angeles Public Library for a time until it moved to the new Hamburger's department store building at Eighth and Broadway in 1908. The site is now part of the "(213) S. Spring" parking garage.
- #240-246 the Hosfield Building, location of the Natatorium (indoor swimming pool) in 1894 and the Imperial Restaurant in 1906. After 1964, location of Victor Clothing, notable for its changing murals reflecting local Chicano culture. Victor Clothing operated here until 2001, and was known for its frequent ads on Spanish-language television.

=== Third and Broadway ===
==== Northwest corner ====
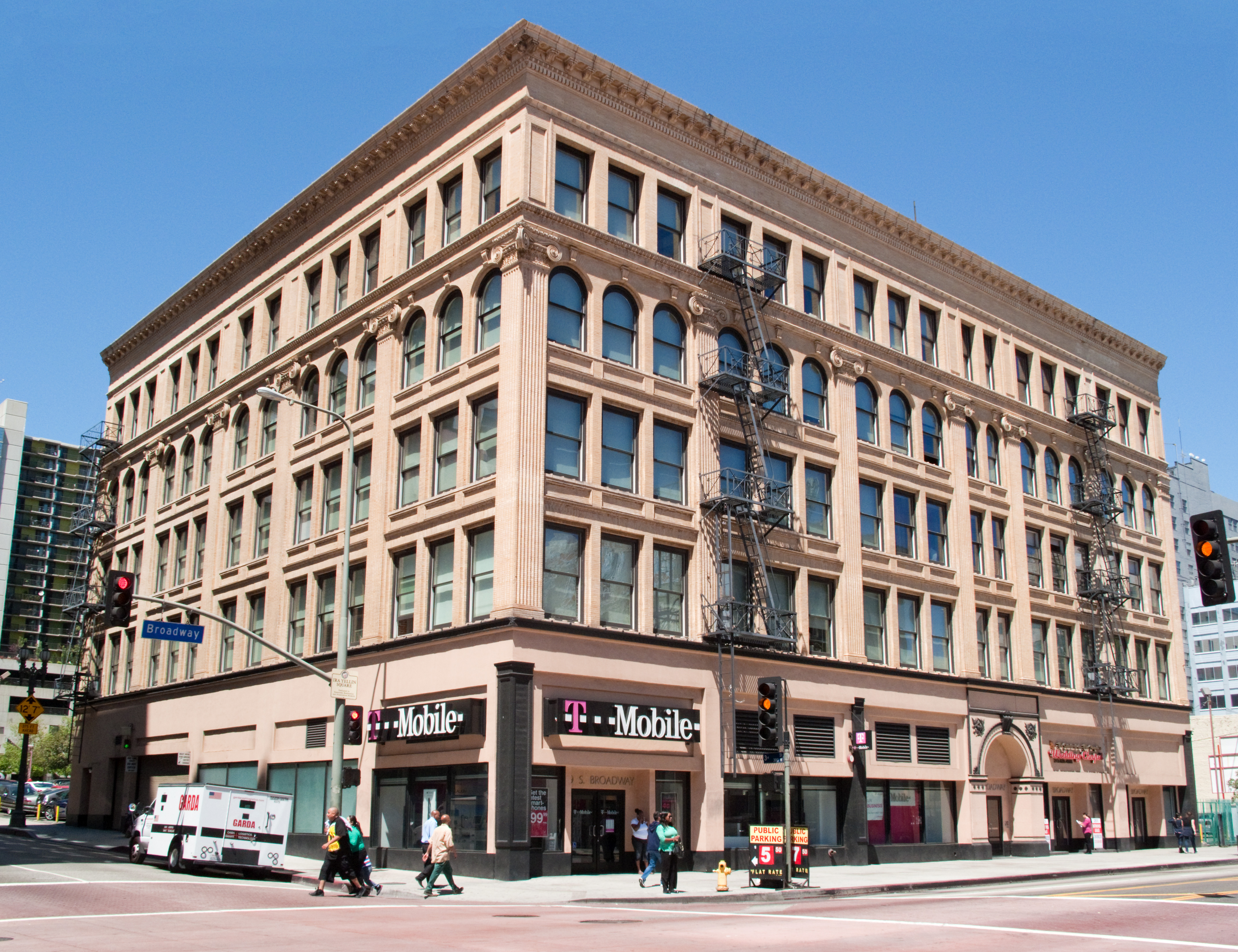
Irvine-Byrne Building (built 1895)

The corner is home to one of the oldest buildings outside the Plaza area, the 1895 Irvine-Byrne Building or Irvine Block or Byrne Building; now called the Pan American Lofts. The architect was Sumner Hunt. It was built in a hybrid Spanish Colonial Revival/Beaux-Arts style.

The building was home to the renowned I. Magnin clothing store that opened here on January 2, 1899; on June 19, 1904, I. Magnin announced that the Los Angeles store would henceforth be known as Myer Siegel. After a fire at the Irvine Byrne Building destroyed its store on February 16, 1911, Myer Siegel moved further south on Broadway.

It was "modernized" and converted to lofts in 2007 and given its present name. The halls and staircase have appeared in many films and television commercials.

From Third Street south to Olympic Blvd. (originally Tenth St.), and from Hill Street east to Los Angeles Street, including Broadway, is the Historic Core district, the city's main commercial and entertainment area in the first half of the 20th century.

==== Northeast corner ====
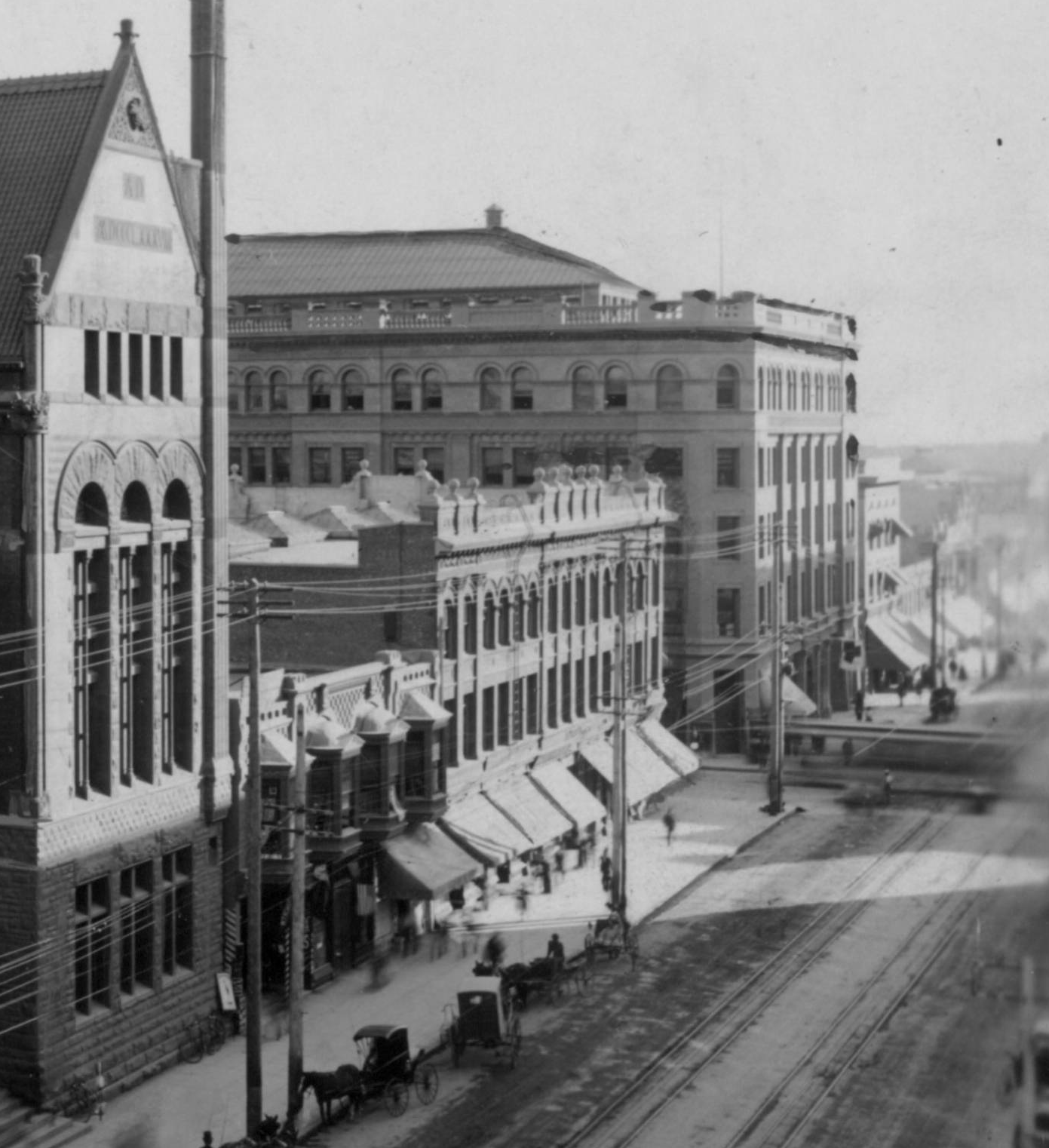
Broadway, east side, looking south past 3rd, c.1903-4. From left to right: 1888 City Hall, Rindge Block, Bradbury Building

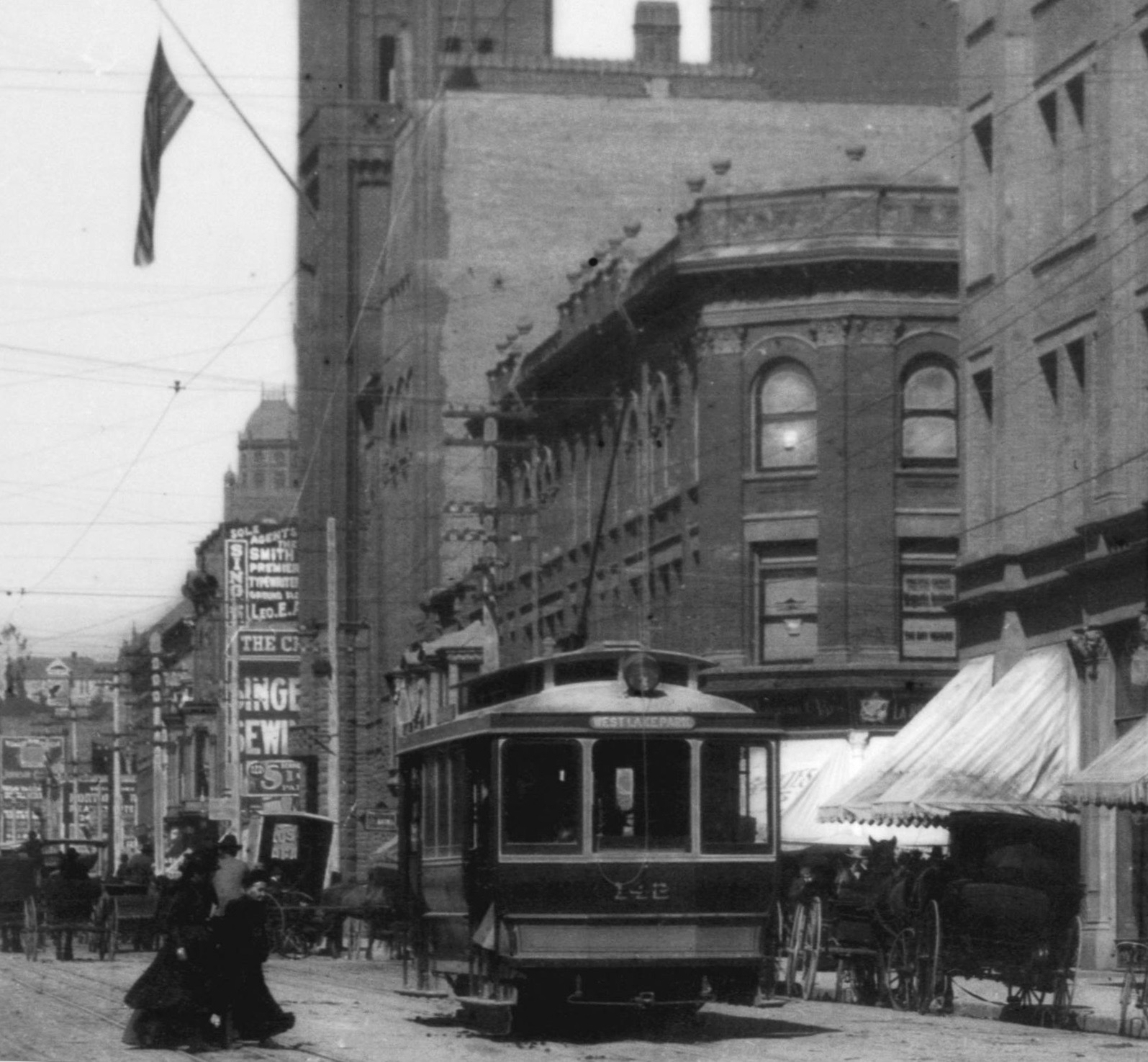
Broadway, east side, looking north past 3rd, c.1888. From left to right: 1888 City Hall, Rindge Block, Bradbury Building

On this corner:

- Originally the J. C. Graves house stood here; Graves bought the property in 1879 for $2,250. The house was sold and removed to 10th and Hope streets in 1888.
- Rindge Block (1898, sold in 1899 for $190,000 to Frederick H. Rindge, the "King of Malibu"), 248–260 S. Broadway, commercial building; the top floors were removed and only the ground floor remains.

==== Southwest corner ====
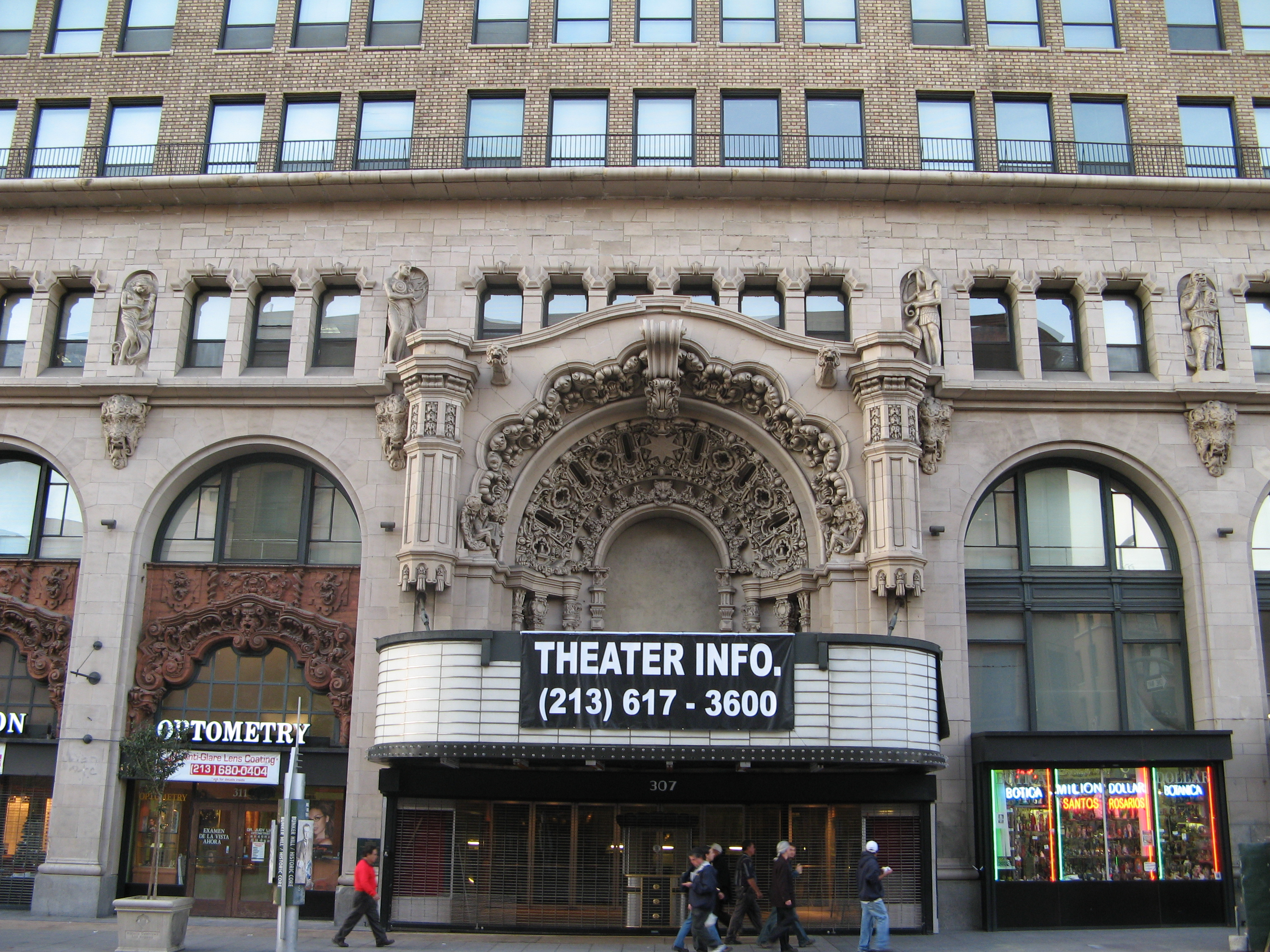
Million Dollar Theatre
- Million Dollar Theatre, (1917-8, architects Albert C. Martin and William Lee Woollett, Spanish Baroque Revival style, 2,345 seats), 307 (orig. 301–313) S. Broadway. It is the northernmost of the movie palaces that comprise the Broadway Theater District and is listed in the National Register of Historic Places. Built by Sid Grauman who would later open Grauman's Chinese Theatre in Hollywood. The theater was designed by architects with a fanciful facade in the Churrigueresque style. After more than 30 years as one of the city's most prestigious first-run movie palaces, the Million Dollar Theater presented Spanish-language films and variety shows from 1950 until the late 1980s. The theater had a seating capacity of 2,345 when it opened in 1918.
  - Before that, from c. 1895–1917, the Muskegon Block stood on the site, (built c. 1895), named after Muskegon, Michigan where its developer Thomas Douglas Stimson had made his fortune in lumber. From 1905–1917, the Ville de Paris department store was located next door at the Homer Laughlin Building, and the Muskegon Block housed retail tenants such as millinery, men's furnishings, jewelry, piano and music stores, as well as offices.

==== Southeast corner ====
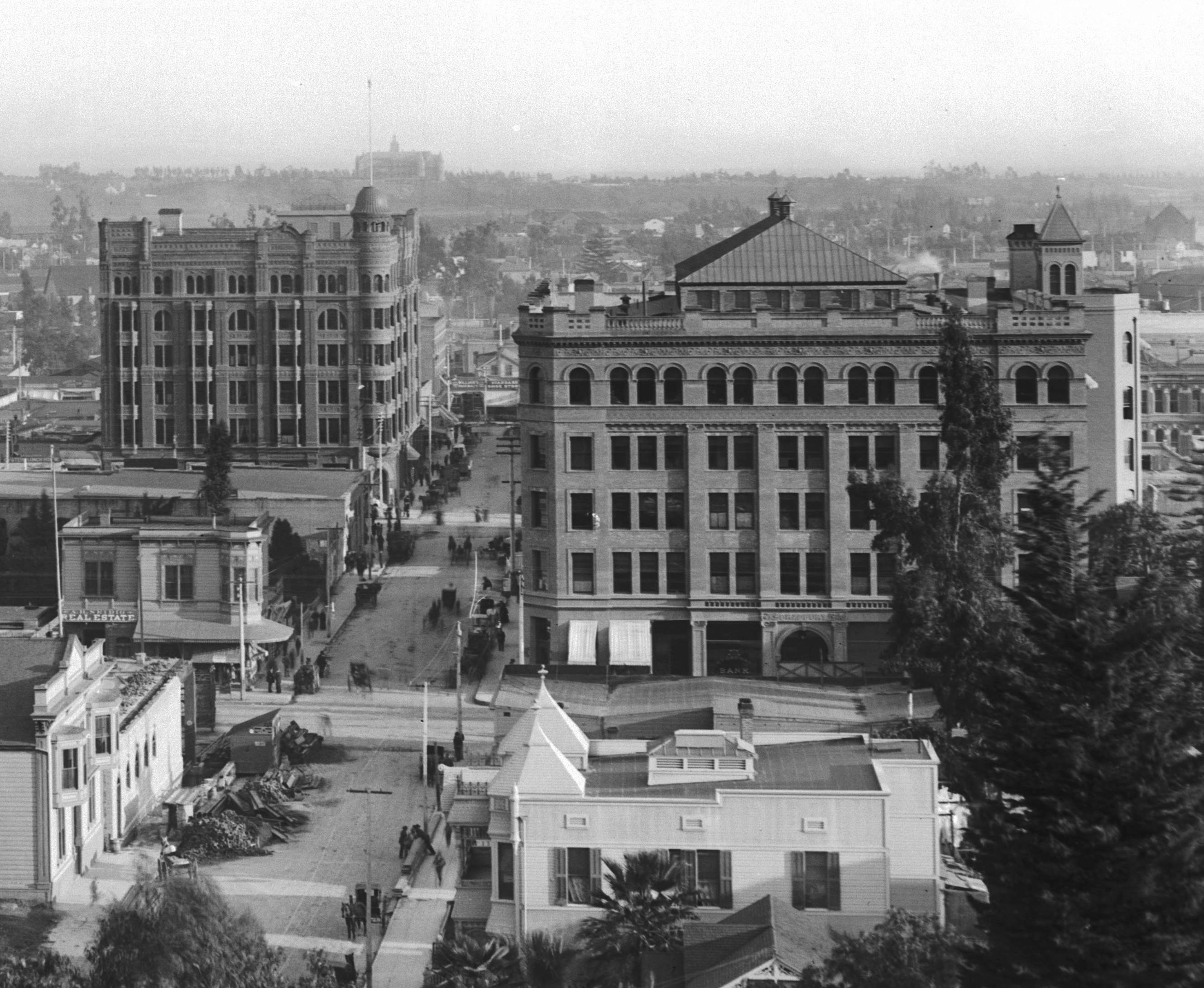
Bunker Hill to Bradbury Building and Stimson Block. 1894–5.

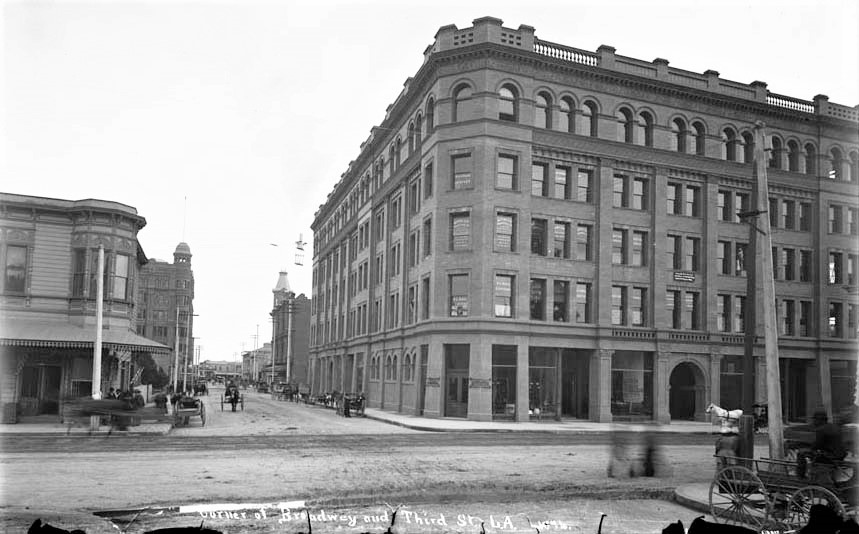
Bradbury Building, 1894
- Bradbury Building (1893, architects Sumner Hunt and George Wyman, Italian Renaissance Revival, Romanesque Revival, and Chicago School styles), the oldest remaining commercial building in Downtown Los Angeles. The Los Angeles Conservancy calls it an icon and a "unique treasure". Commissioned by gold-mining and real estate millionaire Lewis Bradbury. It is famous for its light-filled atrium, open cage elevators, marble stairways and ornate iron railings, and has appeared in many films including Blade Runner.

=== Gallery ===
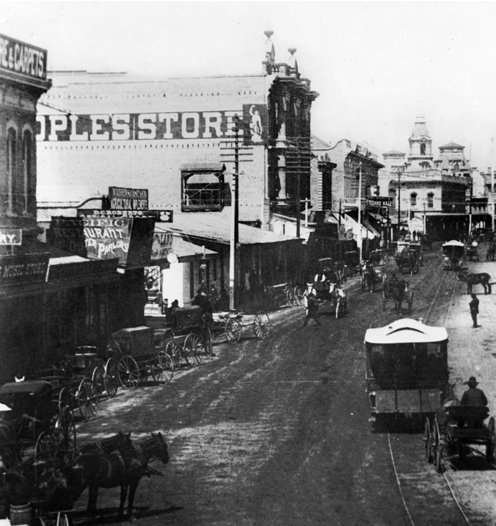
Looking northeast on Spring Street from First Street, 1880s. Asher Hamburger's Peoples Store at center. Towers of the Baker Block are visible in the distance.

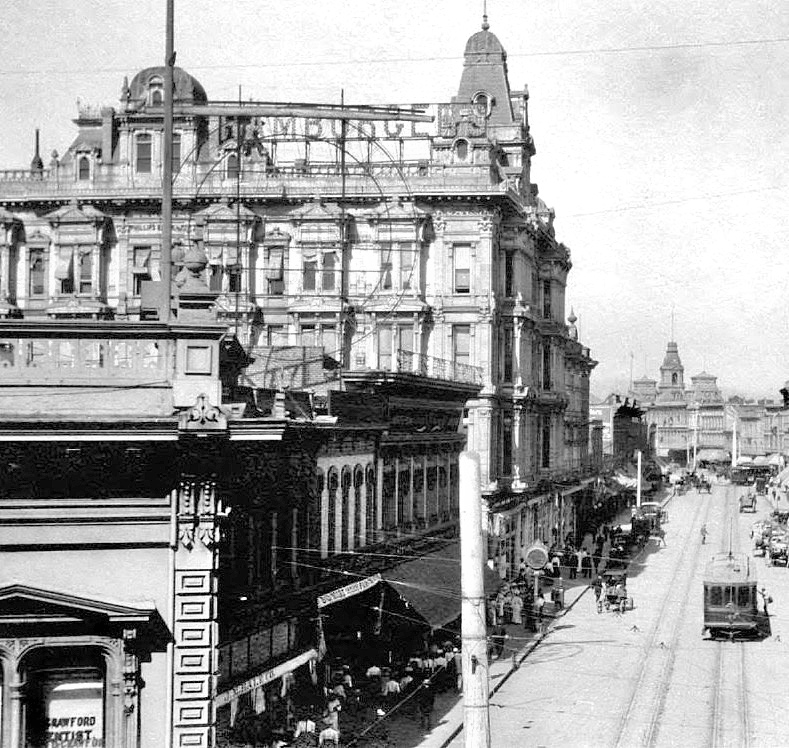
Looking northeast on Spring Street from First Street, 1890s. Hamburger's Peoples Store now in the Phillips Block at center. Electric streetcars replaced horsecars and the street is paved. Today, this is the site of City Hall.

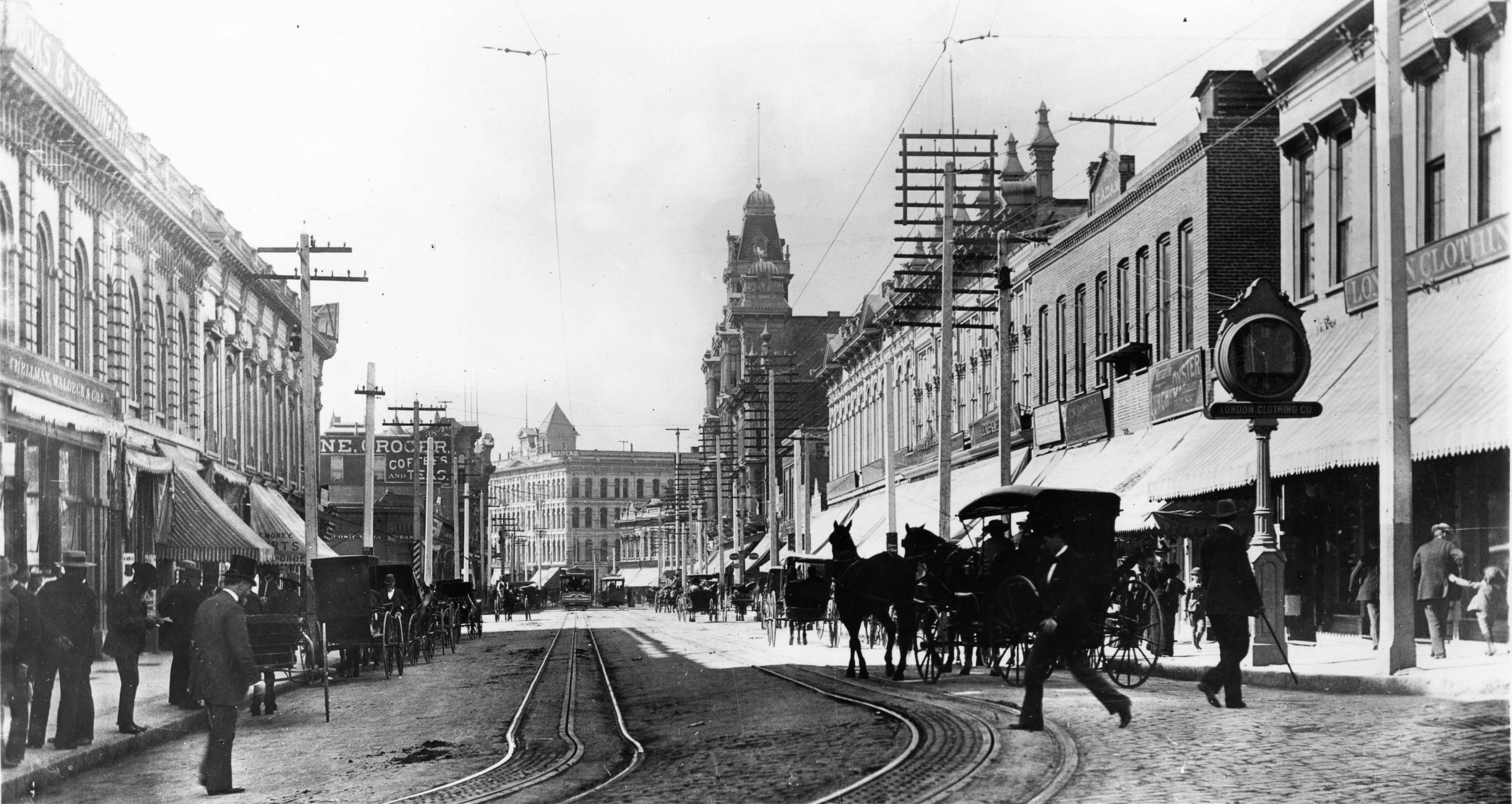
View south on Spring St. from Temple, c.1883–1894. The towers in the background are the Phillips Block; the two larger buildings to its right are the Jones Block and (with turrets) City of Paris. Far right: Allen Block and Harris & Frank's London Clothing Co., with its landmark clock.

=== West side of Spring south of Temple ===
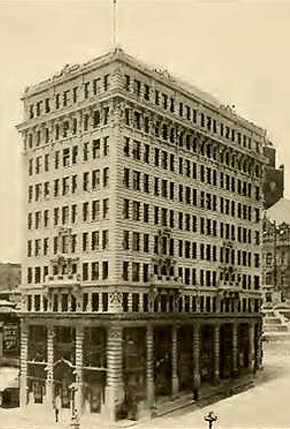
International Savings & Exchange Bank Building (1907) SW corner of Temple/Spring

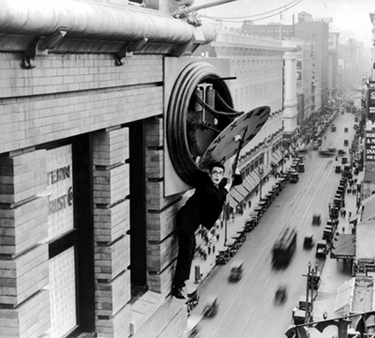
Replica of the Int'l Savings Building façade in the film Safety Last!

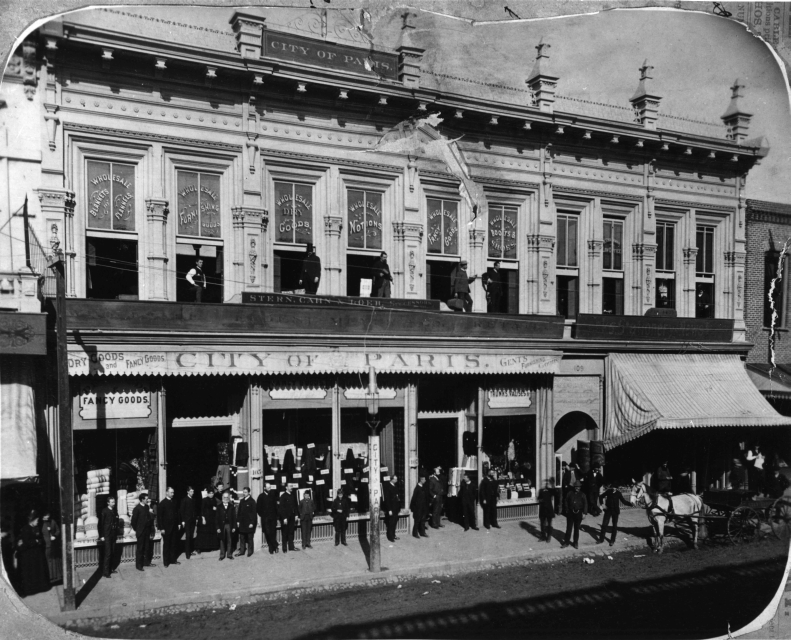
City of Paris department store, north of Phillips Block and south of Temple, sometime between 1883–1890. Note the cable car which ran 1885–1902.

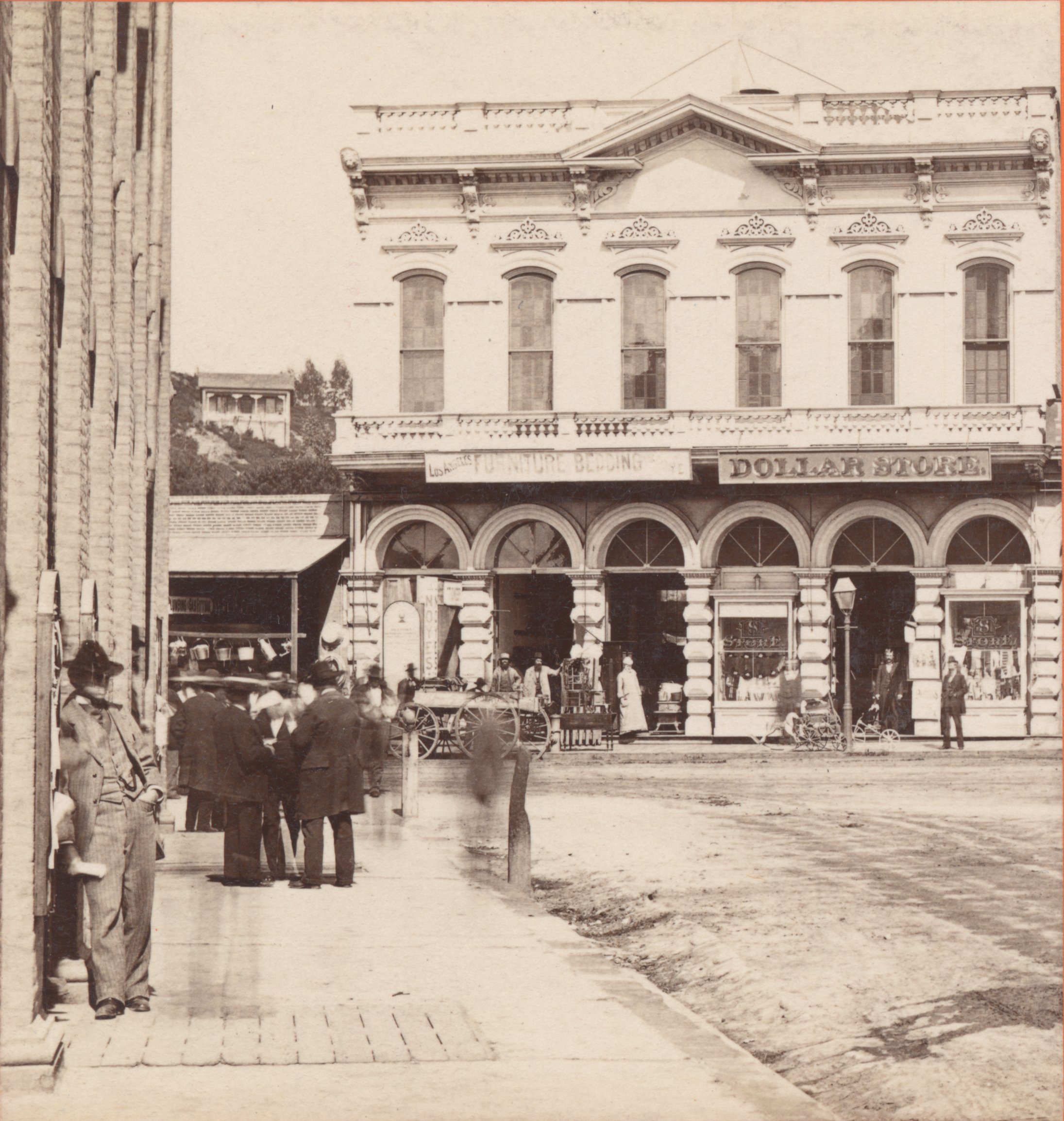
Jones Block, 171–201 N. Spring, west side across from Market St., southern building, c.1880-1885

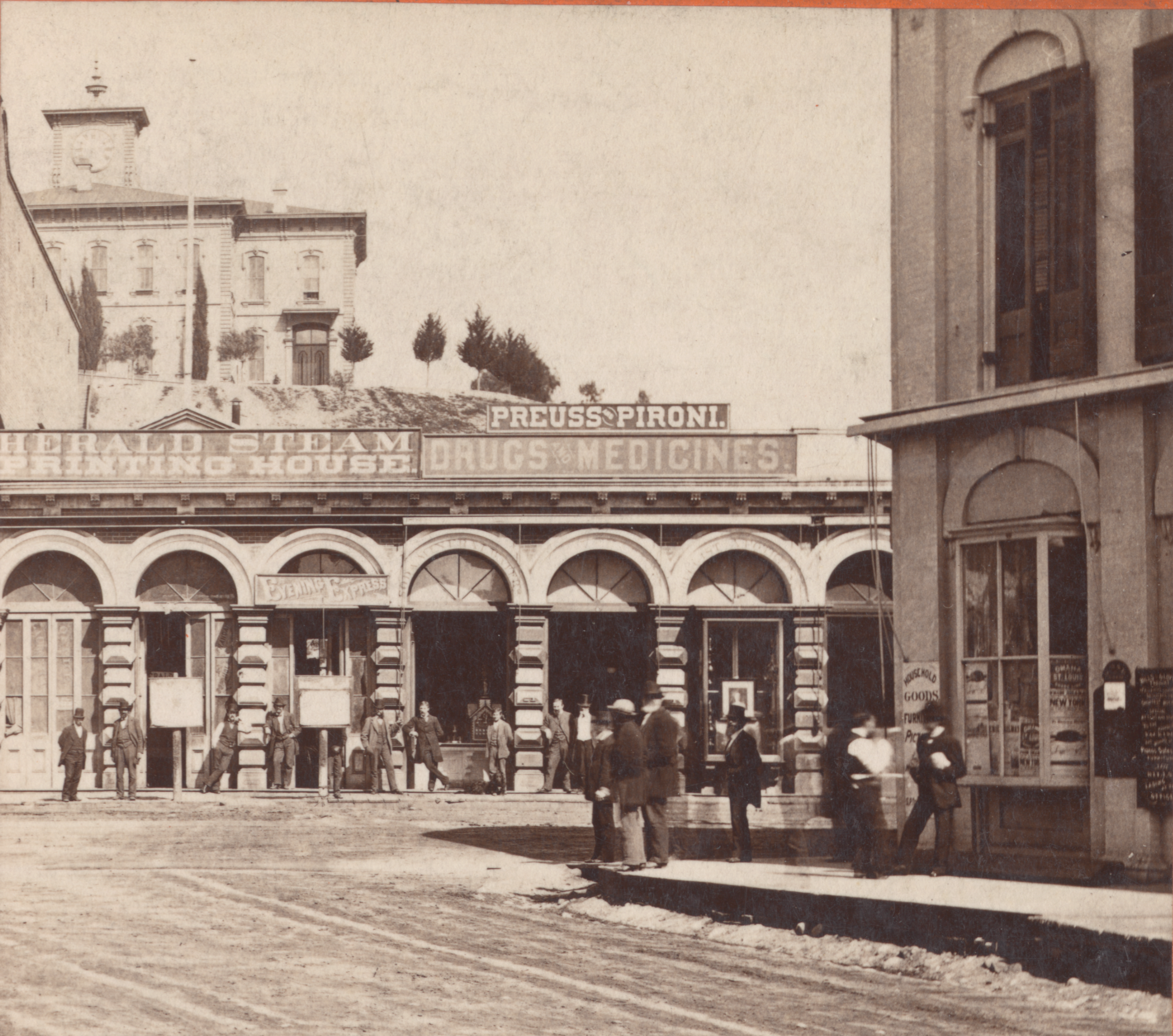
Jones Block northern building c.1880-1885. Los Angeles High School on Pound Cake Hill at back.

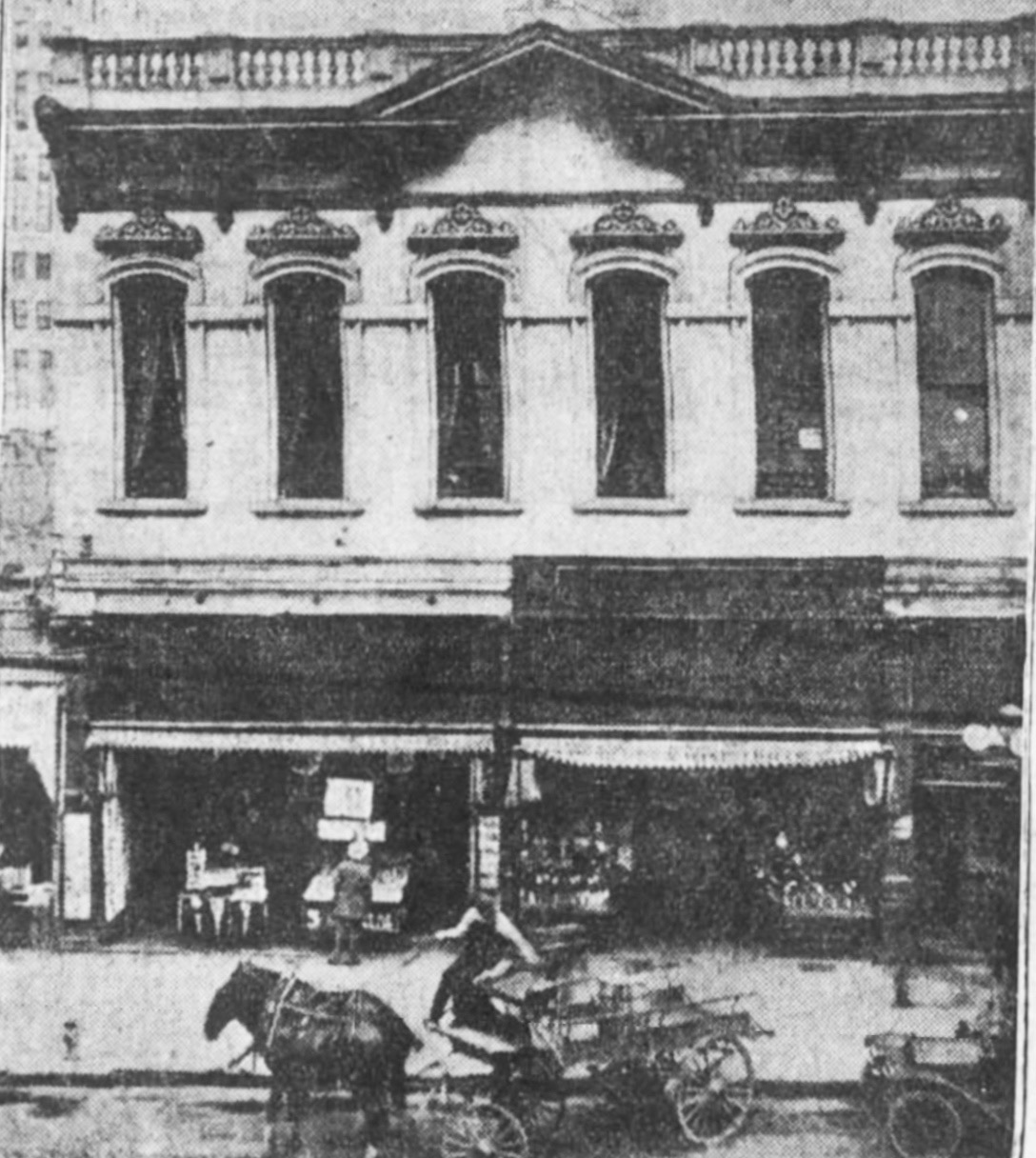
Jones Block sometime between 1886–1895 when home to J. W. Robinson's Boston Dry Goods store.

Along the west side of Spring Street were the following buildings. Spring was realigned in the 1920s and now runs west of these sites, and the sites where these buildings once stood are now part of the full city block on which City Hall stands:

- At the southwest corner of Spring and Temple was the Allen Block, between 1883 and 1894 location of Harris & Frank's London Clothing Co., with its landmark clock. The first J. W. Robinson's Boston Dry Goods store was also located in this block from 1883–1886 before moving to the Jones Block slightly south. The Allen Block was replaced by the International Savings & Exchange Bank Building (10 floors, 1907, H. Alban Reaves, Renaissance Revival and Italianate, demolished 1954-5)), southwest corner of Temple and Spring. A replica of its façade featured in the Harold Lloyd film Safety Last!, in a famous scene where Lloyd hangs off a clock near the building's roof. In its later years it housed city health offices and was called the "Old City Health Building".
- City of Paris department store, 203–7 N. Spring, west side between Temple and the Phillips Block. Spring Street now runs west of this site, which is part of City Hall.
- Jones Block
  - Built 1882 or 1883 and commissioned by Doria Deighton-Jones, demolished in the 1920s to create the City Hall block.
  - Post-1890 numbering 171–179 and 201 N. Spring St.,
  - Tenants included:
    - Los Angeles Herald offices and steam printing plant through 1888
    - J. W. Robinson's Boston Dry Goods at #171–173 from 1886 to 1895. Robinson's would become a major regional department store chain.
    - City of Paris department store at #177 during its final few years of operation, c.1895–1897.

===== Phillips Block =====
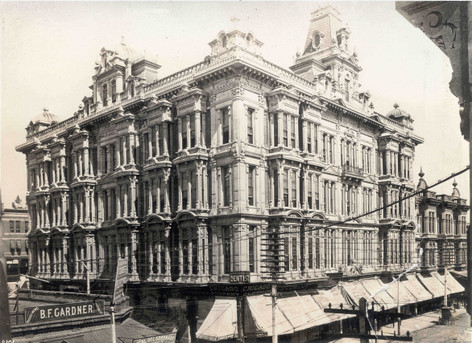
Phillips Block

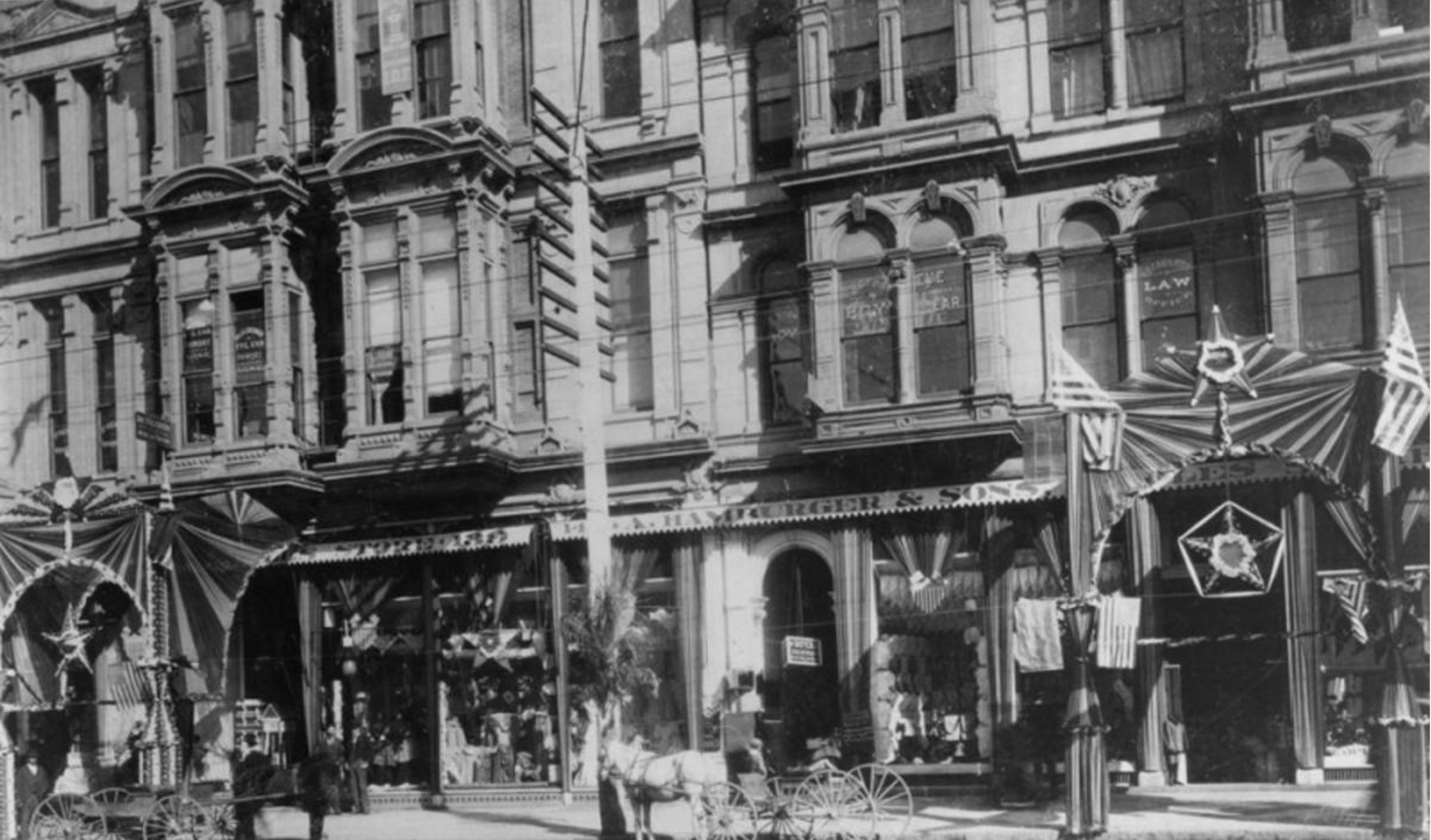
Entrance to Hamburger's department store (forerunner of May Co. California), located at the Phillips Block 1888–1908.

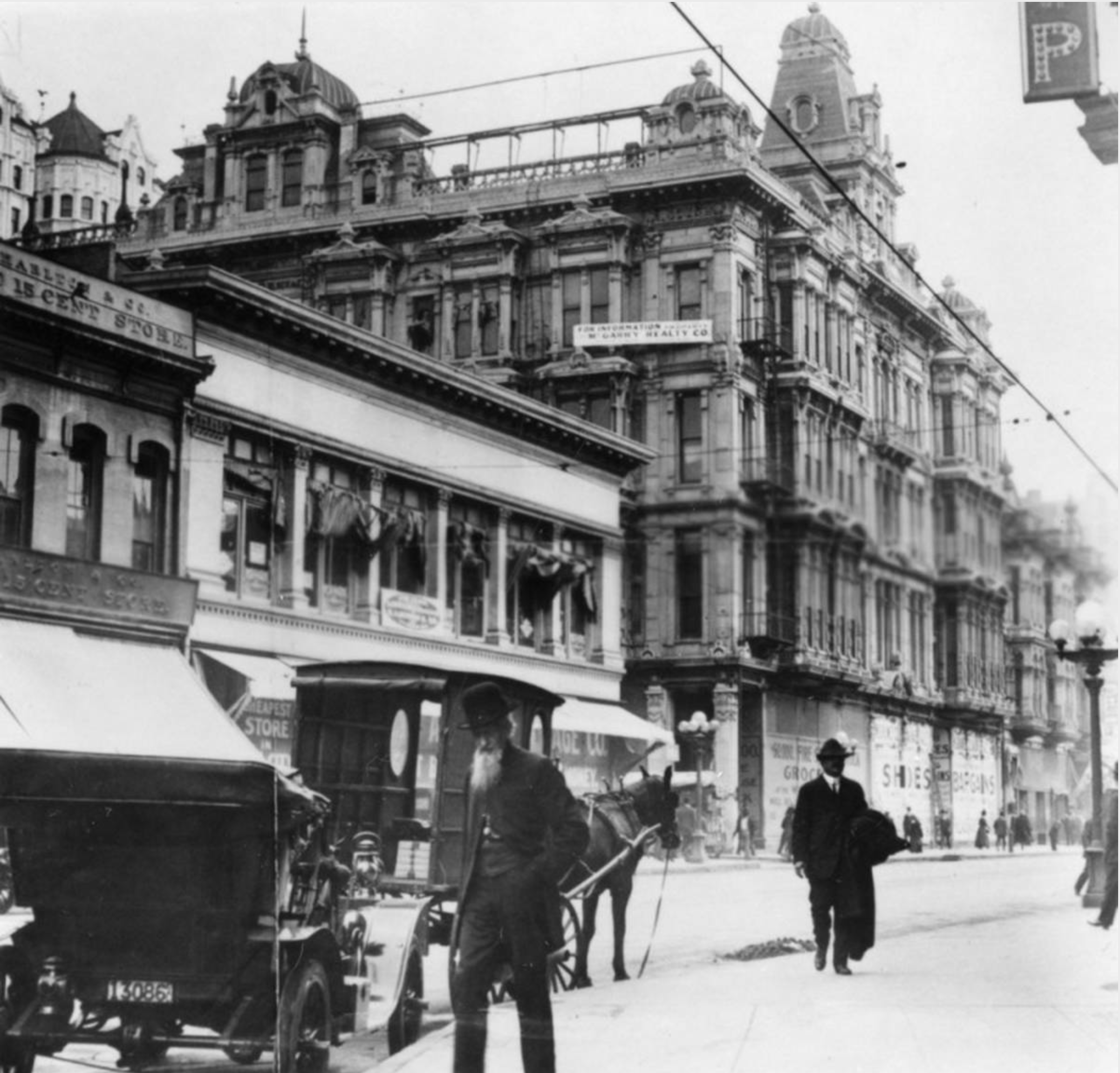
Phillips Block about 1900

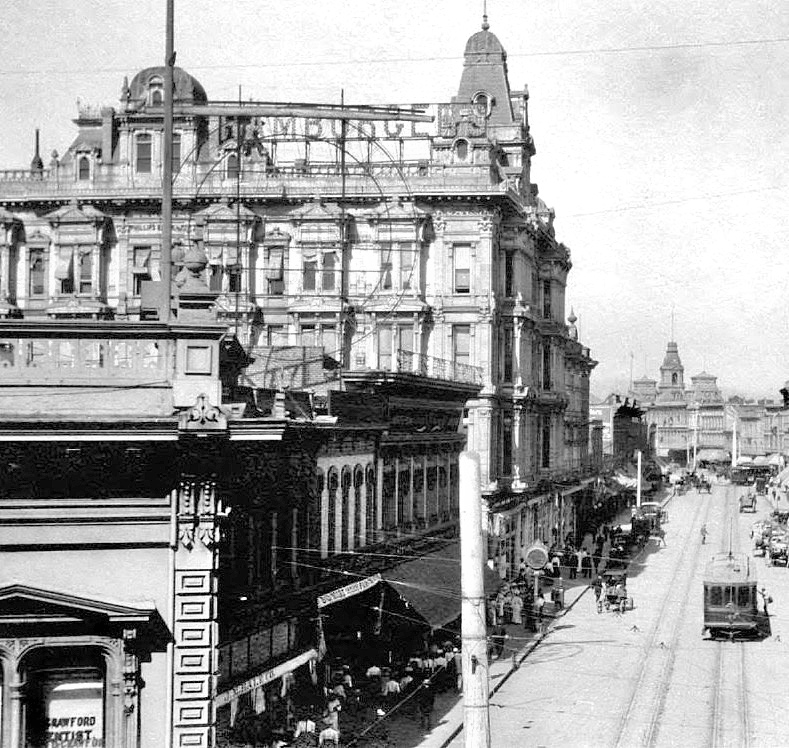
Looking north on Spring St. from First Street, 1890s with view of the Phillips Block.

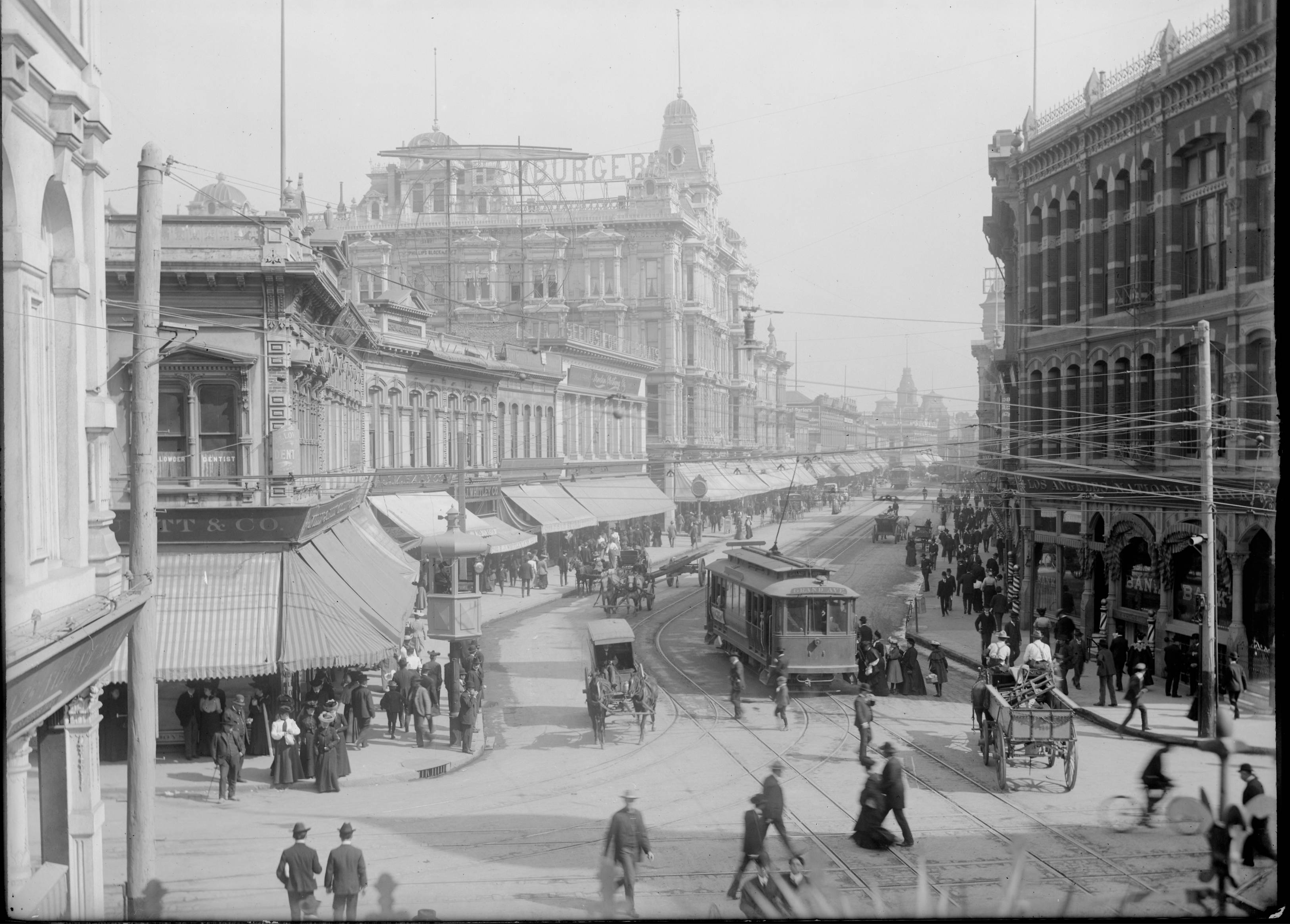
View north on Spring St. from First Street. Phillips Block visible in background, Harris & Frank's London Clothing Company at the SW corner of Franklin/Spring.

At the northwest corner of Franklin and Spring stood two buildings in succession, the Rocha Adobe, then the Phillips Block. The site now lies under the current course of Spring Street, which was straightened, i.e. realigned to run further west, in the 1920s.

- The Rocha Adobe (built 1820 as a residence for Antous Jose Rocha), 31–33 Spring Street (pre-1890 numbering), which from 1853–1884 served as the City Hall, and a building in the yard behind it served as the city and county jail. It was demolished and in its place was built:
- Phillips Block (four-and-a-half stories, opened in 1888, Burgess J. Reeve, French Renaissance Revival architecture), 25–37 N. Spring St. (pre-1890 numbering) at the northwest corner of Franklin St., backing up to New High Street to the west. Owned by Pomona Valley rancher Louis Phillips, it cost $260,000. There was 120 feet (37 m) of frontage on Spring Street, 218 feet (66 m) on Franklin, and 121 feet (37 m) along New High Street. This building was the second four-story structure in Los Angeles. It was sometimes called Phillips Block No. 1 (there was a "Phillips Block No. 2" at 135–145 Los Angeles Street, on the west side between Market and First streets). In July 1888, Asher Hamburger opened the Peoples Store here, later known as Hamburger's; it became the largest retail store in the Western United States. In 1908 it moved to 8th and Broadway, and in 1923 Hamburger sold it to May Co. and it became May Company California. The Phillips Block was demolished in the mid-1920s to make way for the realigned Spring Street and today's City Hall.

===== Franklin to First =====
At the southwest corner of Franklin Street from 1894–1905 was Harris & Frank's London Clothing Co. with its landmark clock. Harris & Frank went on to become a chain of junior department stores for men's clothing across the region.

=== East side of Spring south of Temple ===
===== Temple Block =====
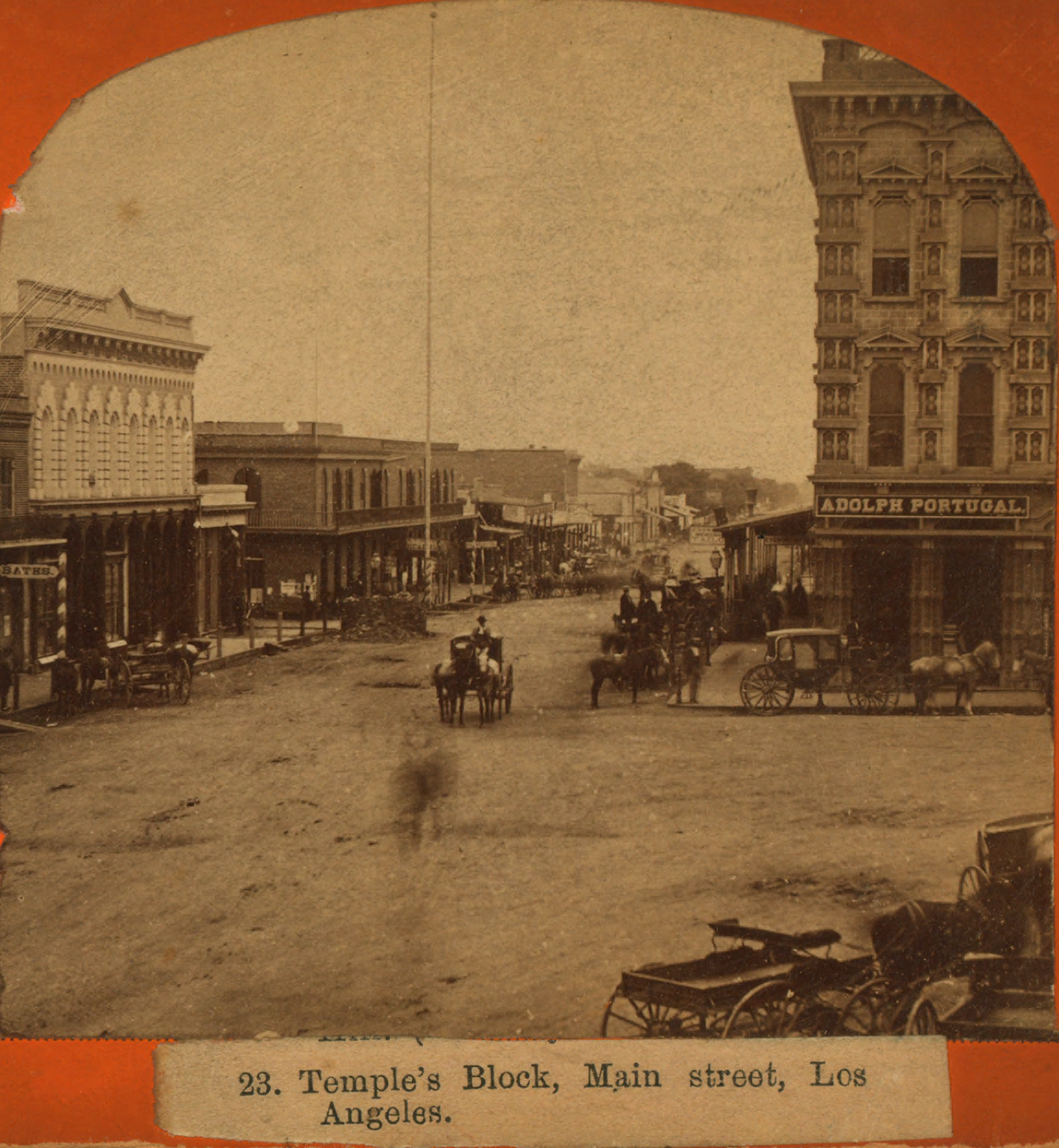
Looking south on Main St. towards Temple Block with Adolph Portugal dry goods store, mid-1870s

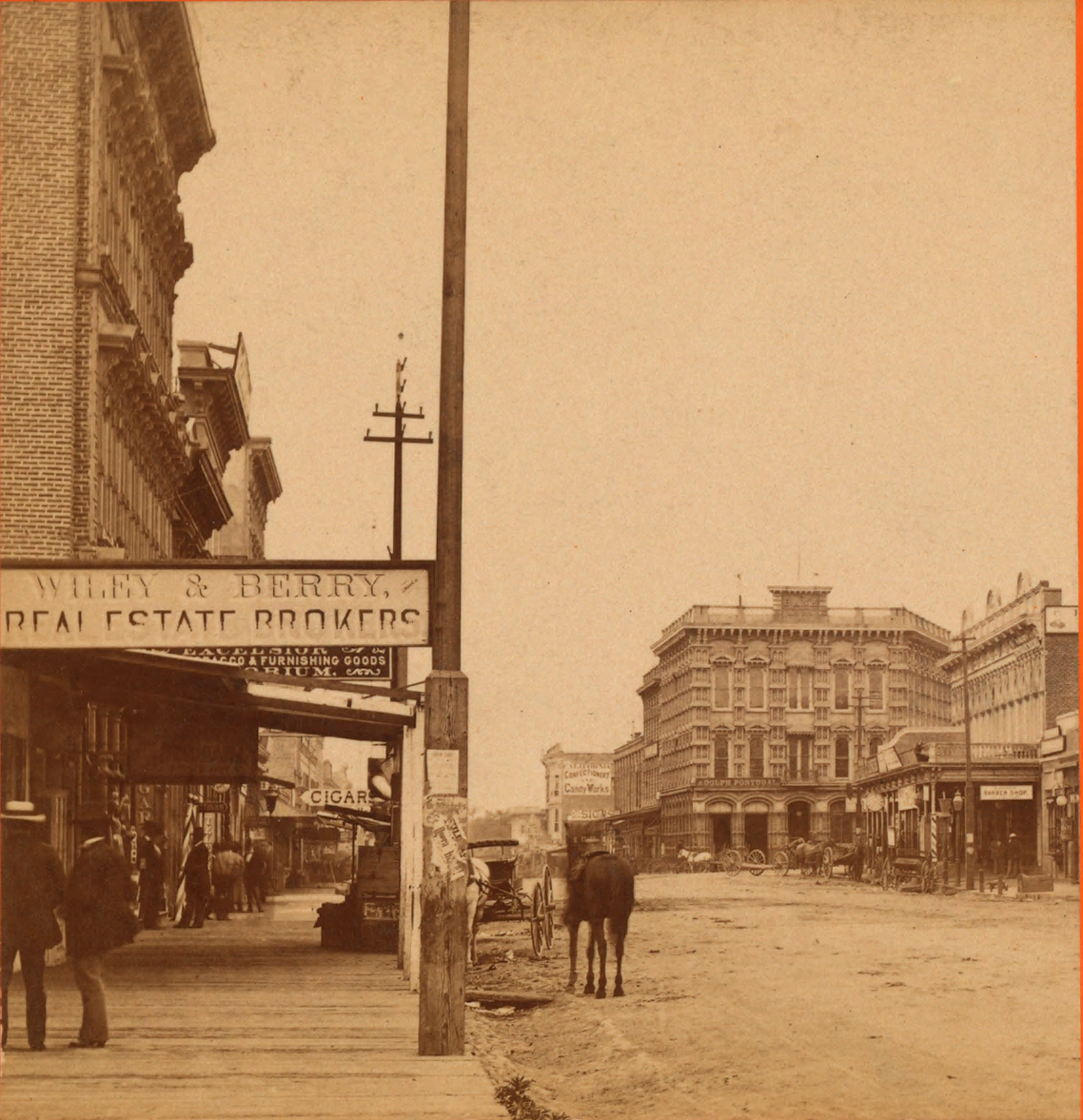
Further north on Main St., looking south towards Temple Block, mid-1870s

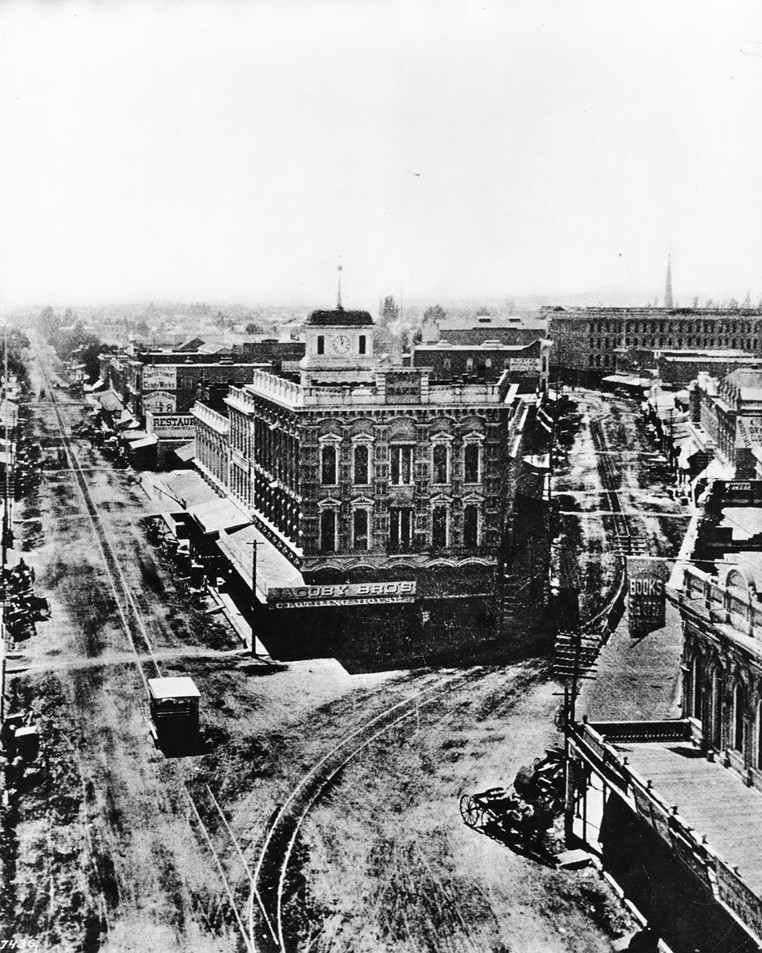
Temple Block c.1885. Courthouse clocktower visible immediately behind Temple Block. Main St. (l), Spring St. (r)

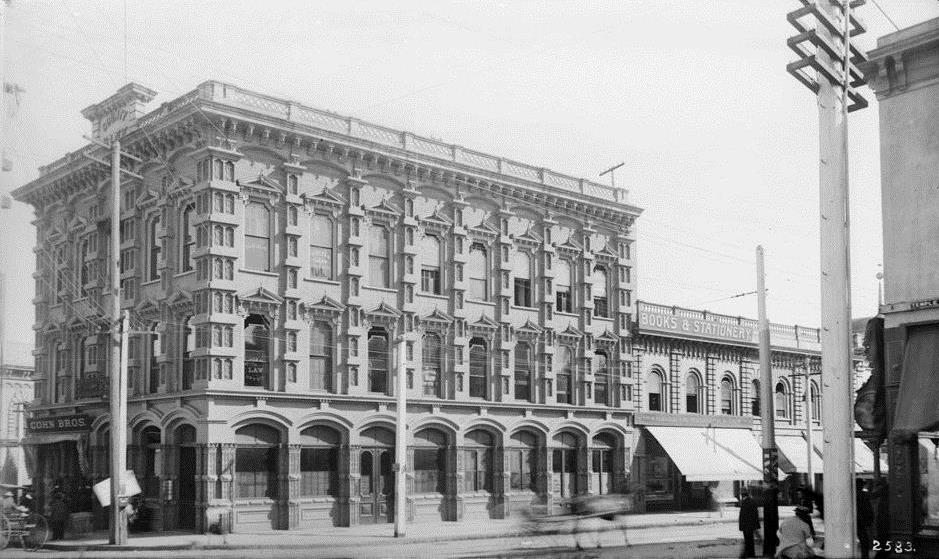
Spring St. side of Temple Block, sign for Cohn Bros. store, mid-1890s.

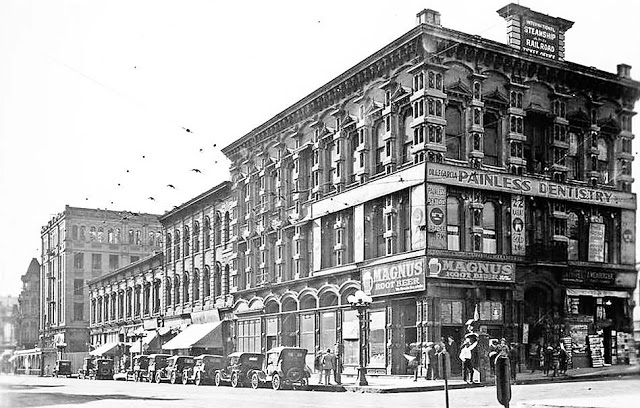
NE portion of Temple Block at SW corner of Temple (r) and Main (l), 1924

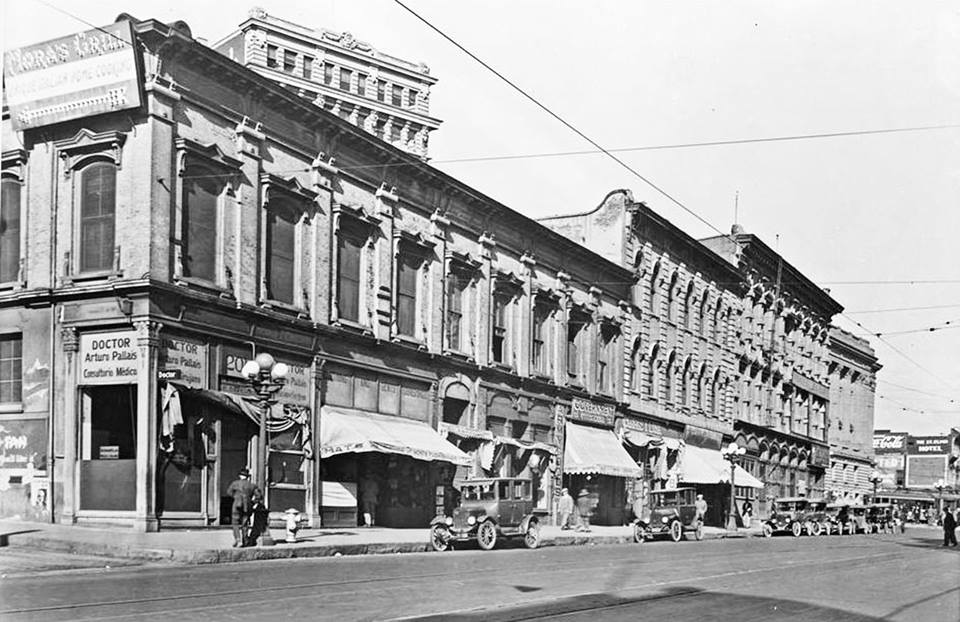
Eastern side of Temple Block, looking north along the west side of Main Street towards Temple St. (r), 1924

The triangular space where Spring and Main Streets came together at the south side of Temple Street was the site of Temple Block: actually a collection of different structures that occupied the block bounded by Spring, Main and Temple. The first or Old Temple Block built by Francisco (F. P. F.) Temple in 1856, was of adobe, two stories, facing north to Temple. This was incorporated into a later, expanded Temple Block in 1871, and then demolished. George P. McLain wrote that upon his arrival in the town in 1868, Temple Block had been the undisputed center of commerce and social life in the town. Even into the early 1880s, it was considered the city's most stately building. It housed many law offices, including those of Stephen M. White, Will D. Gould and Glassell, Chapman and Smith. The block had a key role in the retail history of Los Angeles, as it was the first home to several upscale retailers who would become big names in the city: Desmond's (1870–1882) and Jacoby Bros. (1879–1891). It was also home to the Odd Fellows, the Fashion Saloon, the Temple and Workman Bank, Slotterbeck's gun shop, the Wells Fargo office. The northeast corner was home to Adolph Portugal's dry goods store (1874-1879?), Jacoby Bros. (1879–1891) and Cohn Bros. (1892–1897), in succession.

In 1925-7 this block and other surrounding areas were demolished to make way for the current Los Angeles City Hall.

Along the south side of Temple Block was Market Street, a small street running between Spring and Main.

===== Clocktower Courthouse/Bullard Block =====
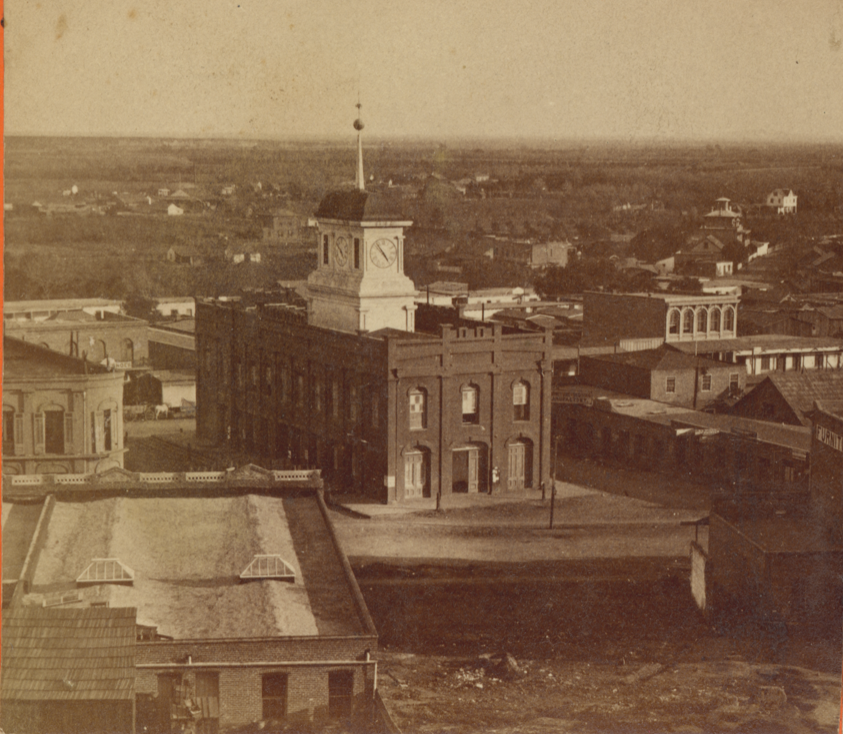
Clocktower Courthouse viewed from Fort Hill (from the west)

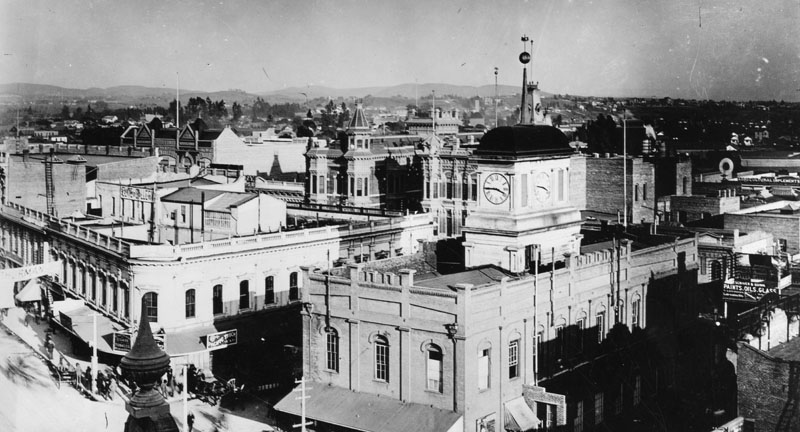
View from Spring St. of Clocktower Courthouse (r), southside of Temple Block (l), United States Hotel (back)

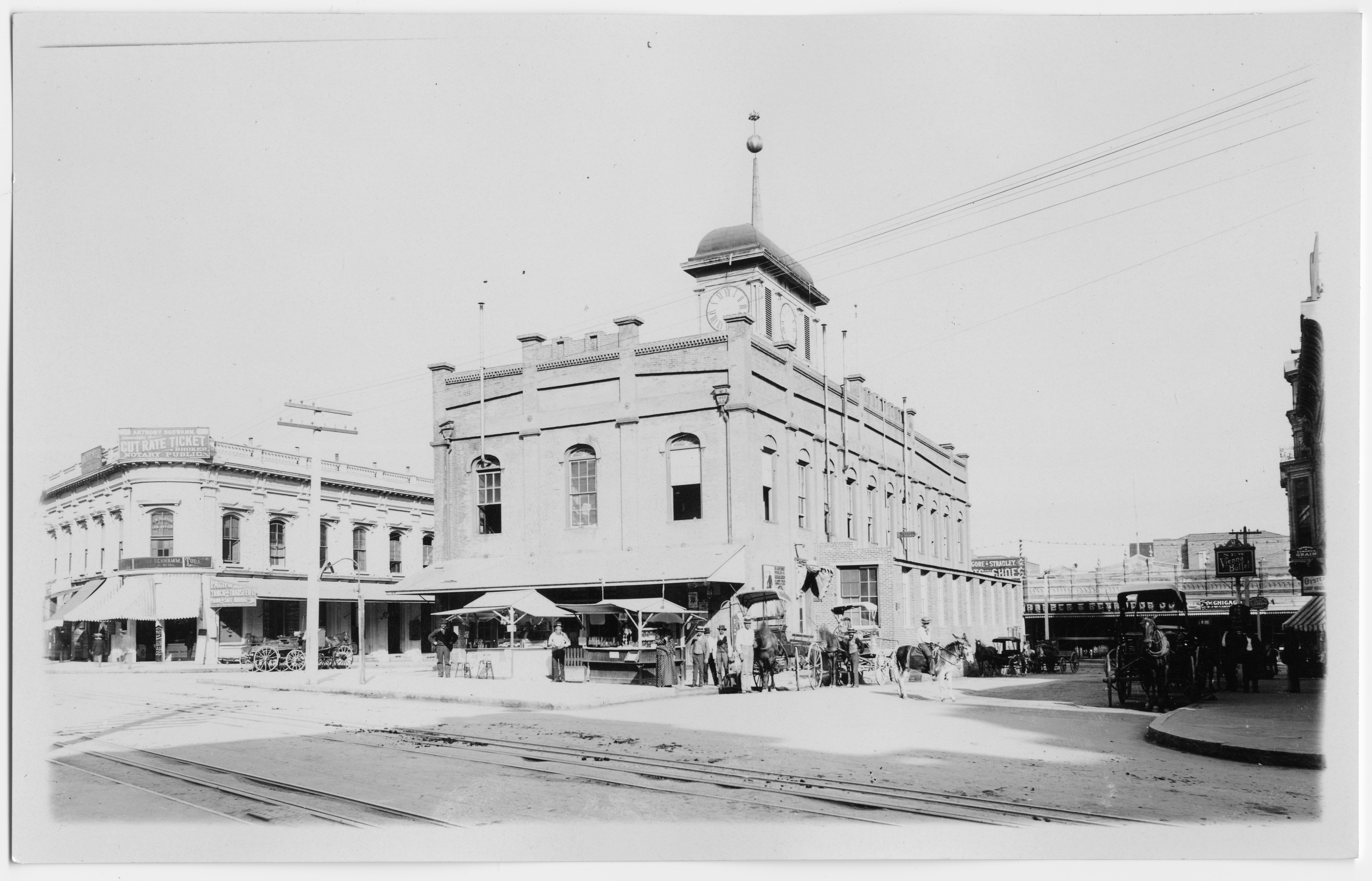
Clocktower (Temple) Courthouse, Market and Theater

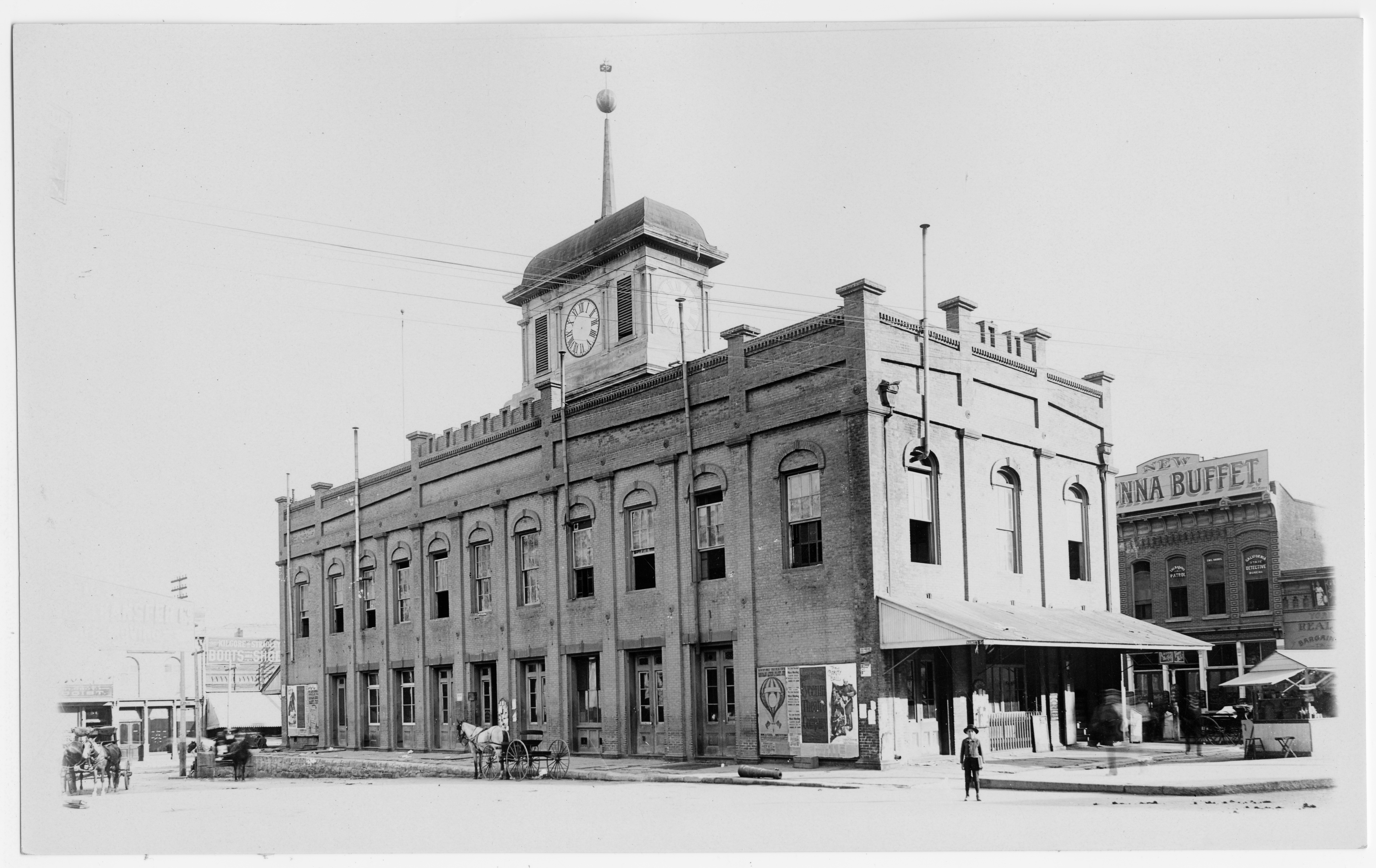
Clocktower Courthouse, view from Spring St. looking SE, with the Vienna Buffet on Court St. visible

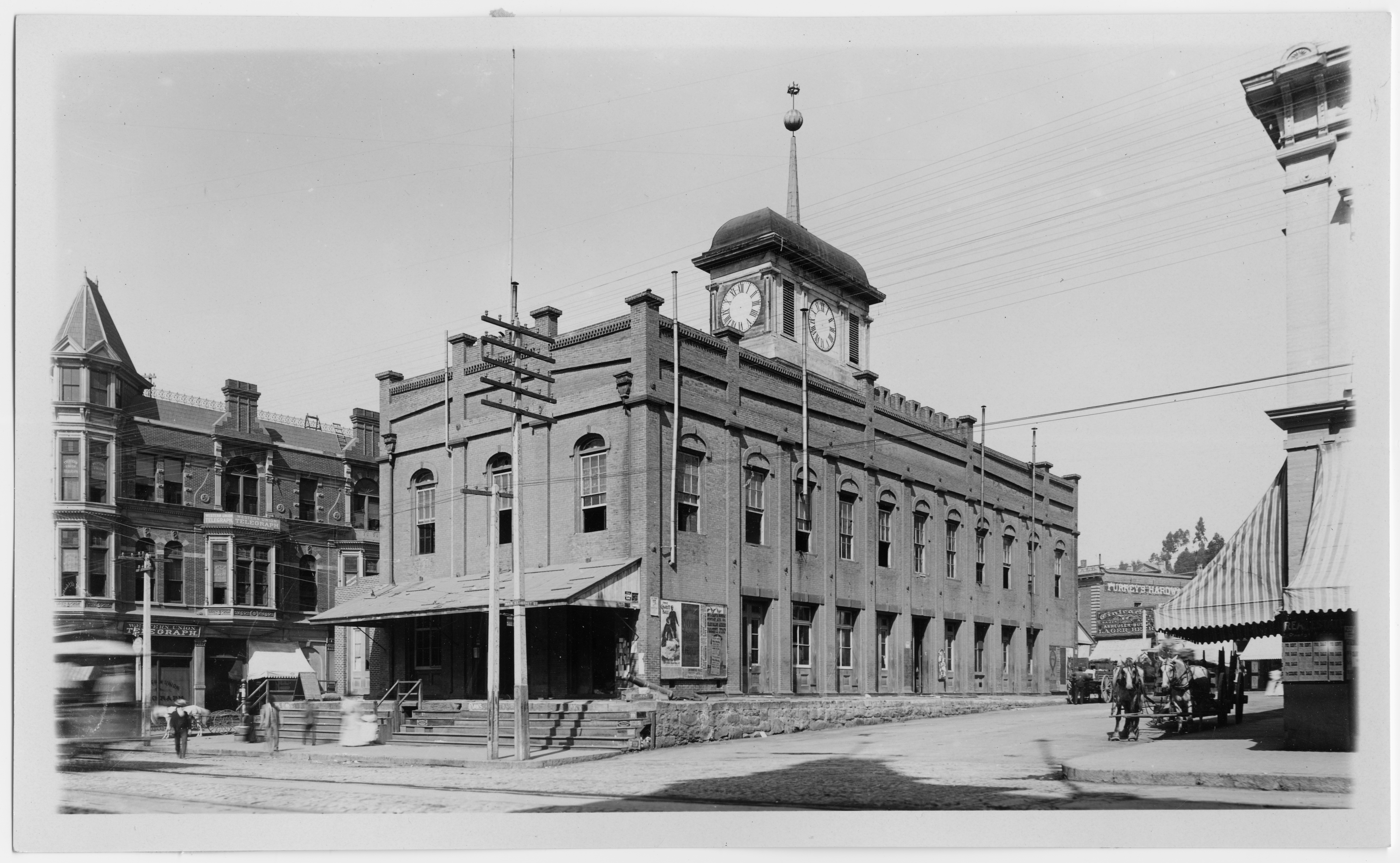
Clocktower Courthouse

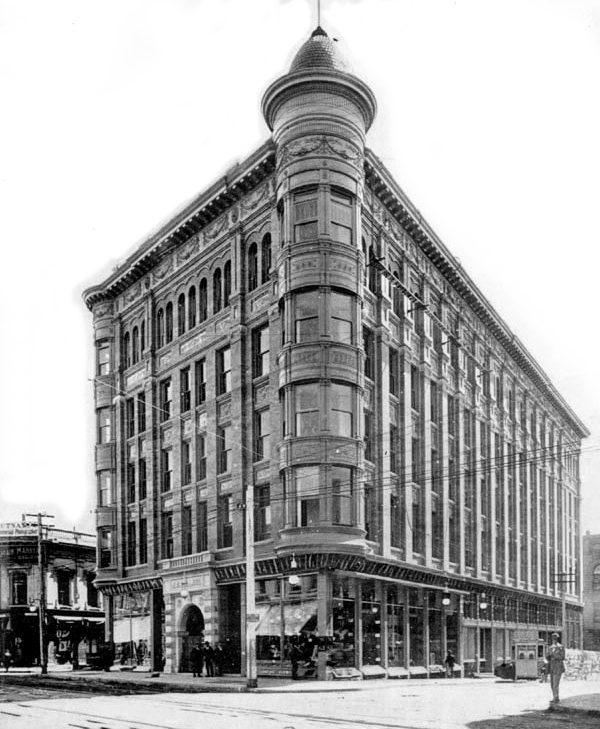
Bullard Block c.1900. It replaced the Clocktower Courthouse in 1895.

Taking up the small block immediately south of Temple Block between Market and Court streets, facing both Spring and Main streets, were two buildings in succession:

  - Clock Tower Courthouse: Just south of Temple Block across tiny Market Street was a building known by many names including Temple Courthouse, Temple Market, Temple Theater, Old County Courthouse, etc. Also built by John Temple, in 1858, originally as a market (ground floor) and theater (upper floor). Demolished 1890s. Served as a market and retail as well as the County Courthouse 1861-1891 until the Red Sand Courthouse was finished. Topped by a rectangular tower with a clock on all four sides. The Clock Tower Courthouse was demolished in 1895 and replaced by:
  - Bullard Block, built in 1895-6, architects Morgan & Walls, 154–160 N. Spring, NE corner of Court Street. Replaced the Clocktower Courthouse. Housed The Hub Clothing Co., a large department store for apparel. See also the photo below of "La Fiesta". Demolished 1925-6 to make way for current Los Angeles City Hall.

===== Court south to First =====
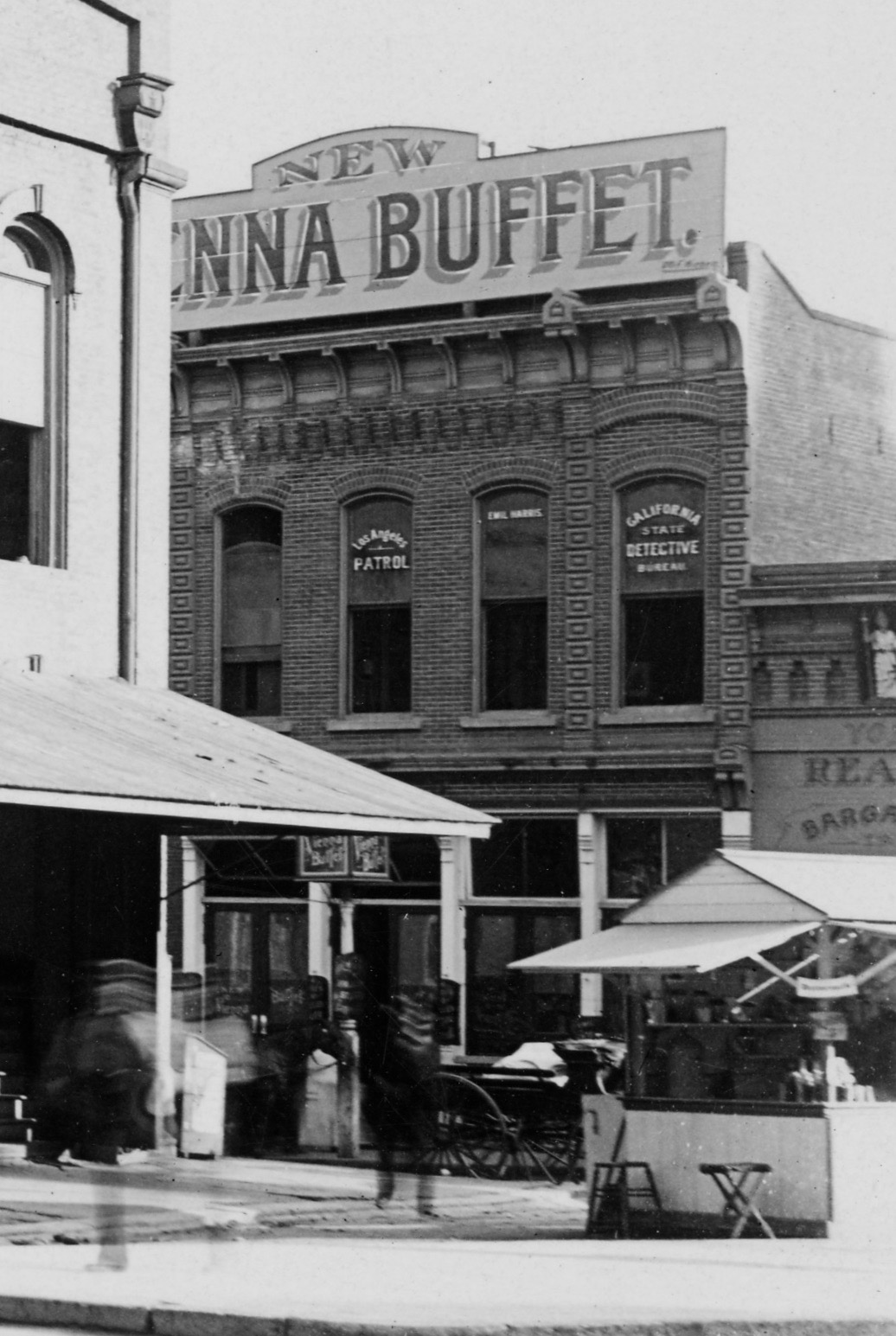
Vienna Buffet, which played a role in the city's LGBTQ history, seen sometime between 1891–1902

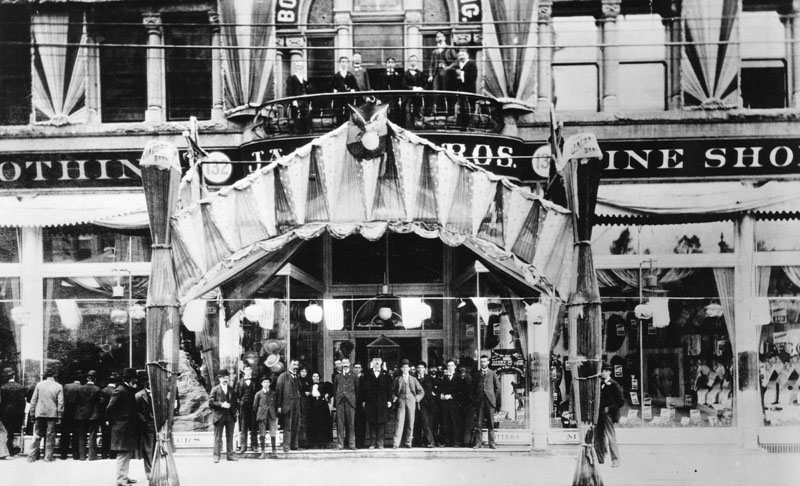
The "palatial" Jacoby Bros. store, 128–134 N. Spring Street, around 1896
- Court Street, a small street running between Spring and Main. At 12-14-16 Court Street (pre-1890 numbering). 112–116 Court St. (post 1890 numbering) was the Tivoli Theatre which opened and closed in 1890. From 1891 through 1902, the venue was the (New) Vienna Buffet, a restaurant with live music where scandal occurred, and gatherings of gay men including what were then called "she boys". Then from 1902–c.1910, the site was the Cineograph Theatre, a vaudeville venue. From 1918–1925 it was marked the Chinese Theatre with the Sun Jung Wah Co. performing Chinese plays.
- H. Jevne & Co. grocers were located at 38–40 (after 1890: 136-138) N. Spring (the older "Wilcox Block", also known as the Strelitz Block) from 1890-1896 before moving to the Wilcox Building when it opened at 2nd and Spring.
- Jacoby Bros. dry goods store was located at 128–134 N. Spring St. from 1891-1900, and added the Jevne premises in 1896 (thus encompassing all of 128 through 138 N. Spring). The store moved to Broadway south of 3rd St. in 1900, another signal that the upscale shopping district was moving southwest away from this area at that time.

=== First and Spring ===
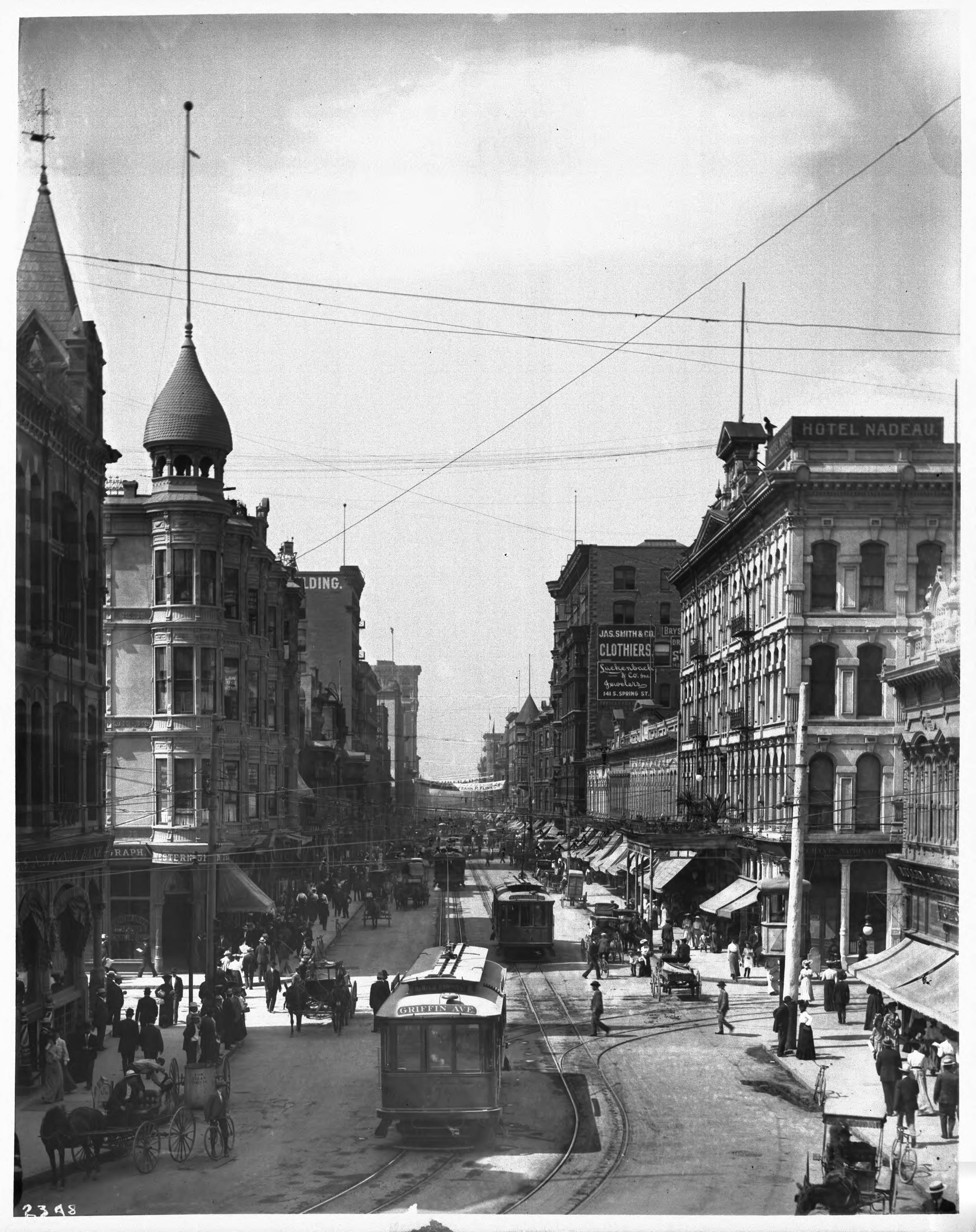

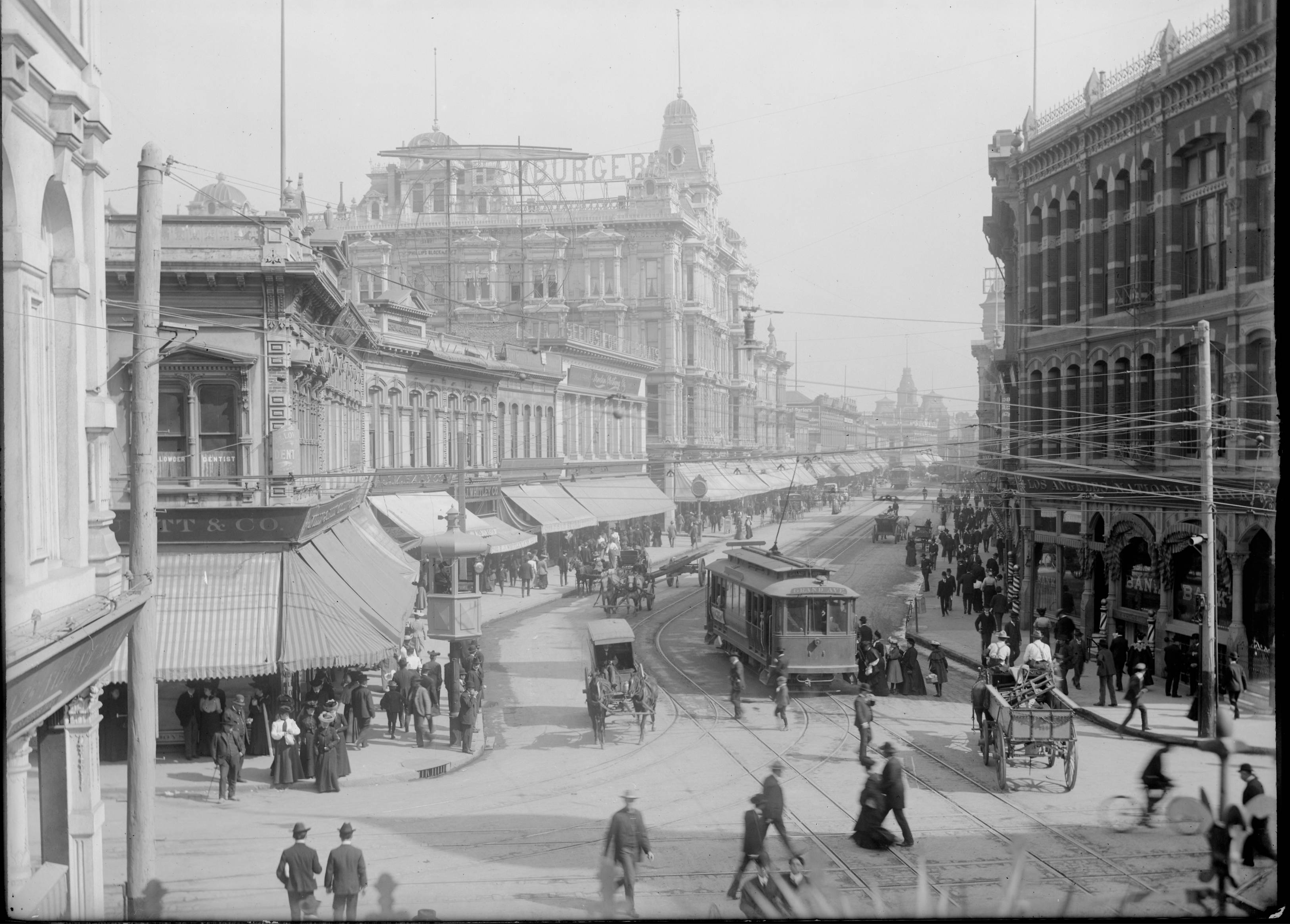
View north on Spring St. from First Street. Los Angeles National Bank building in foreground, right. Larronde Block in foreground, left. Phillips Block visible in background. Note the electric streetcar to Grand Ave.

The image at above left looks south past the intersection of First and Spring sometime around 1900–1906. The spire of the Wilson Block is prominent on the left, as is the Nadeau Hotel on the right. In the foreground we can see the Los Angeles National Bank to the left and the Larronde Block to the right. From First to Second streets, Spring Street is still a busy shopping district, though Broadway is also just becoming popular for more upscale shopping. An electric streetcar heads to Griffin Avenue in Montecito Heights, on what would become Line 2 of the Los Angeles Railway. Today, this view would be of the 2009 LAPD Headquarters taking up the entire block on the left and on the right, the 1935 Los Angeles Times Building, and behind it, the 1948 Crawford Mirror Addition building.

==== Northwest corner of First and Spring ====
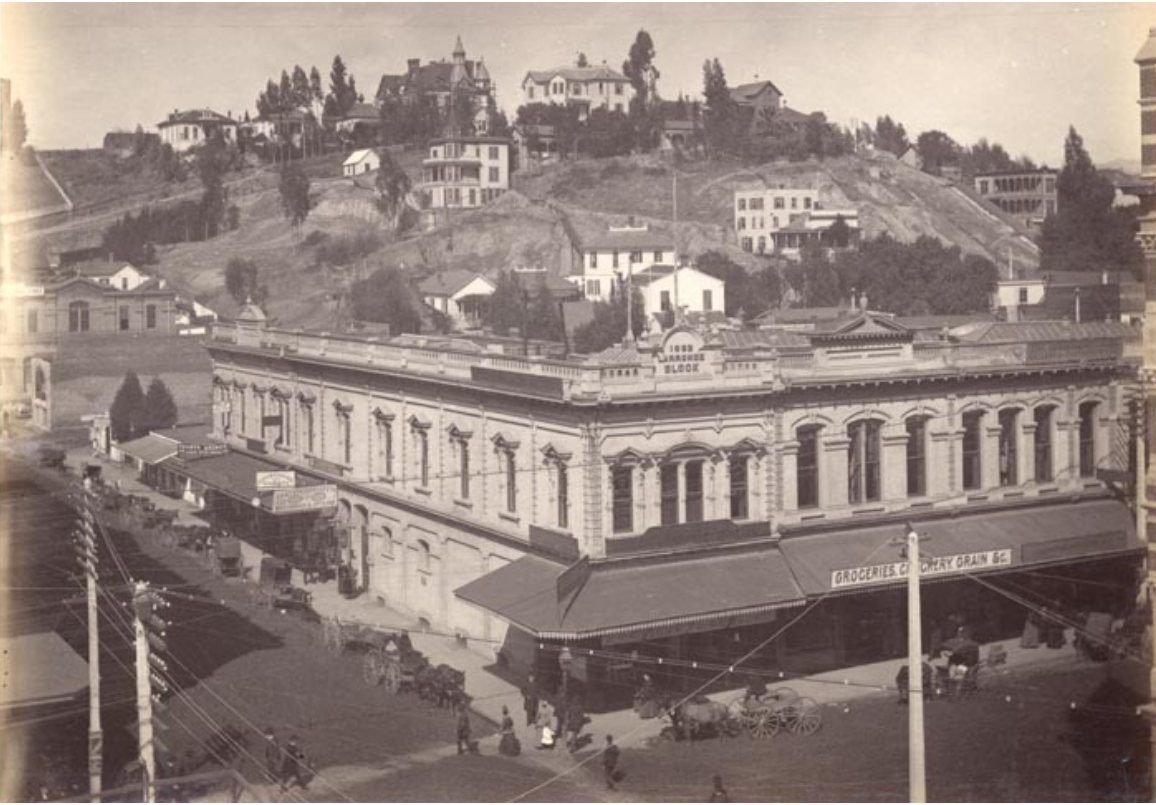
Larronde Block in 1898. Photo by I. W. Taber

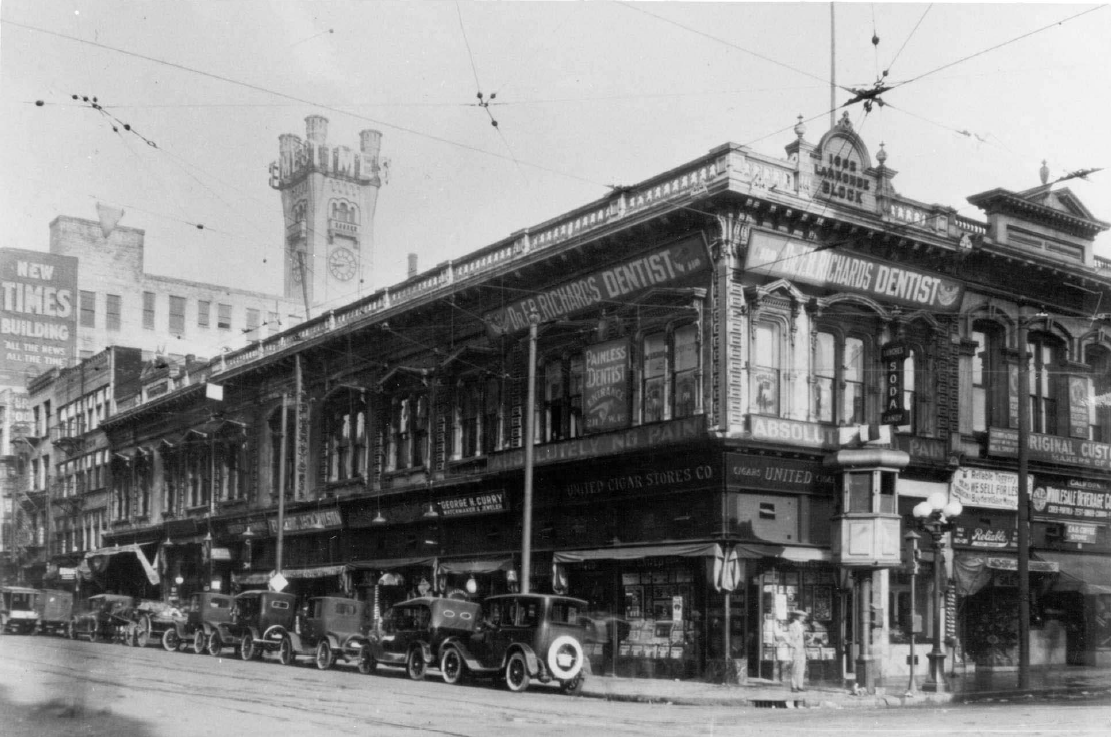
Larronde Block, undated photo, probably 1910s

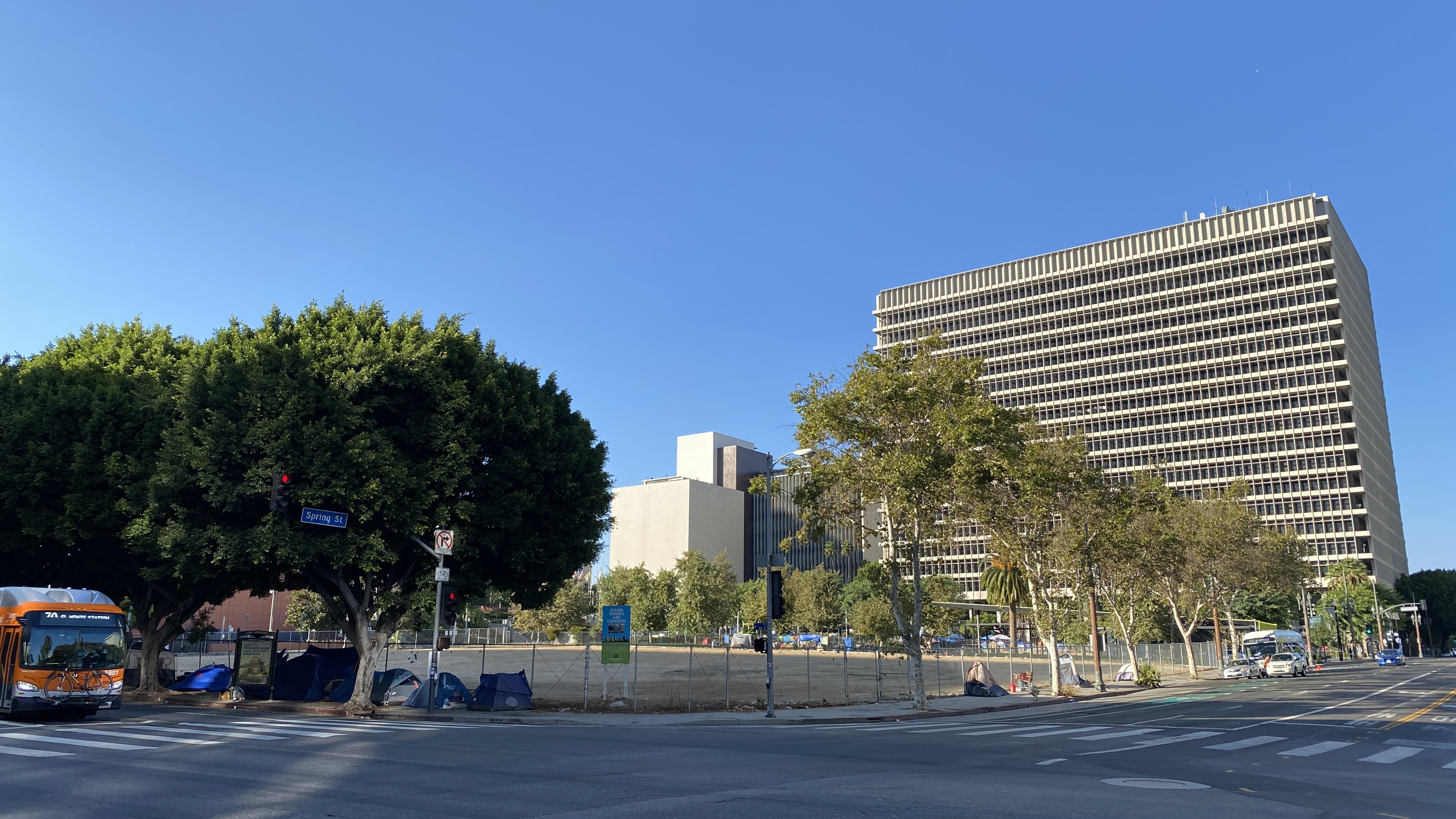
NW corner of 1st/Spring, 2020, an empty lot. Back right: County Courthouse (1972)
- Larronde Block, built in 1882 at a cost of $10,000, 211 W. 1st St., also 101–105 N. Spring, two stories, offices and retail shops, including:
  - Mullen & Bluett, a major clothing store, 101–105 N. Spring, from its founding in 1889 through 1910.
- California State Building (completed 1931, opened 1932, architect John C. Austin, 1931, demolished 1976).
- The lot is currently vacant

==== Northeast corner of First and Spring ====
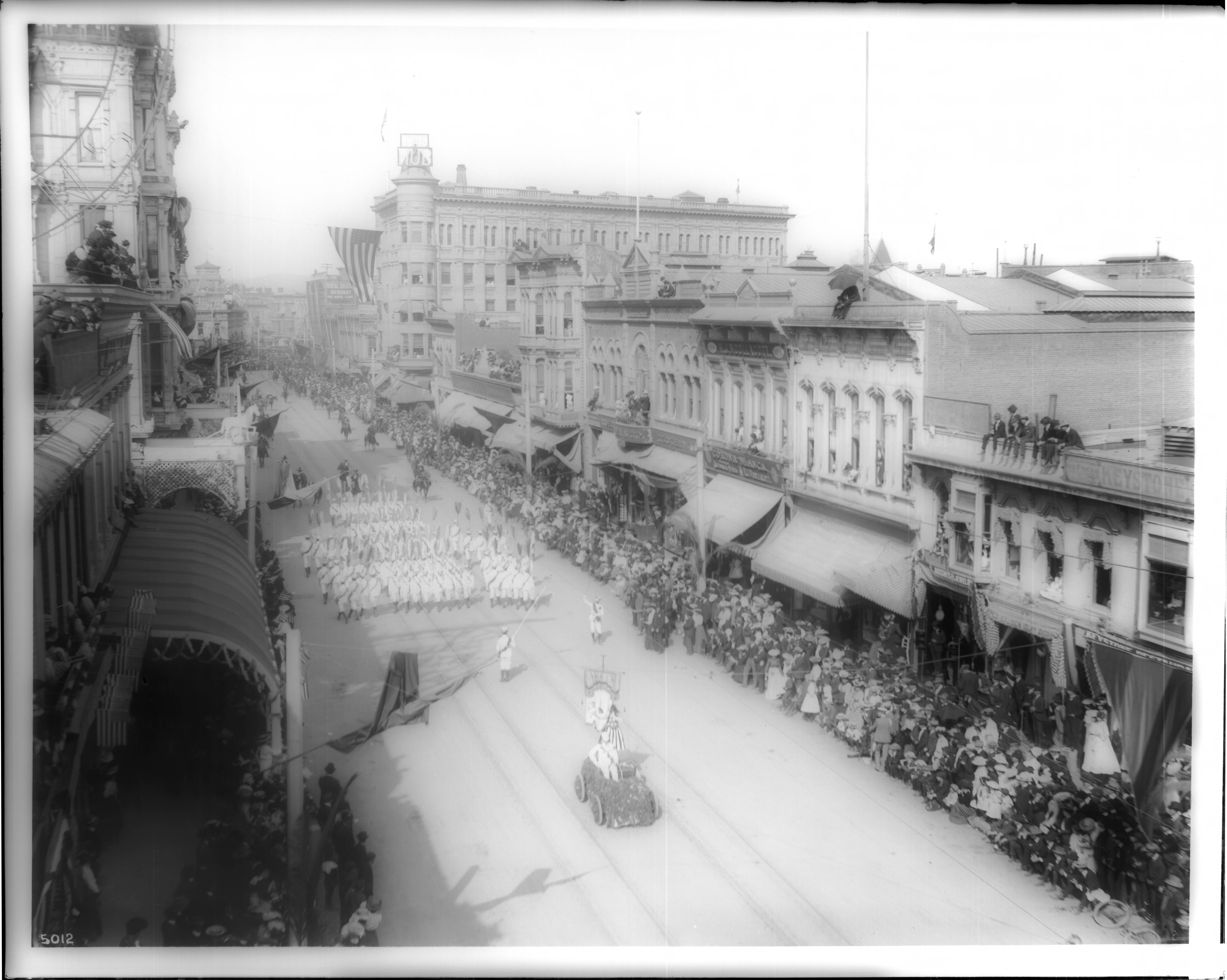
The east side of Spring Street, north of First, during the Fiesta de Los Angeles in 1903. The Bullard Block is in the distance at the top, center left.

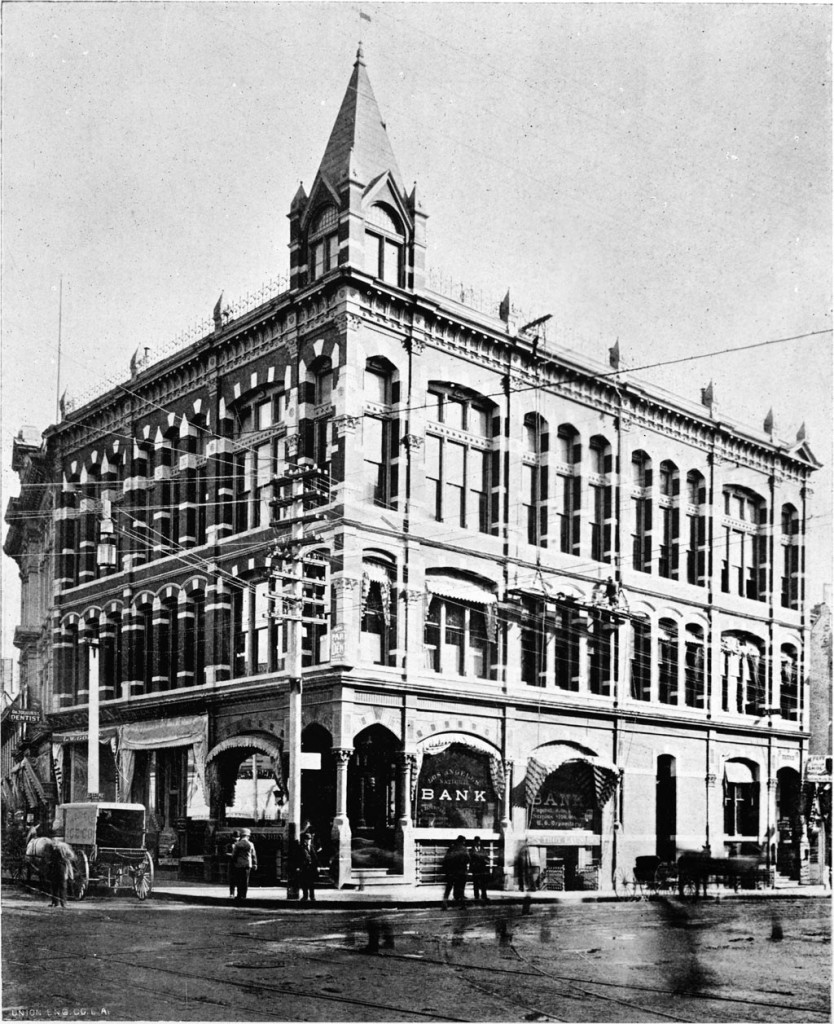
Los Angeles National Bank Building

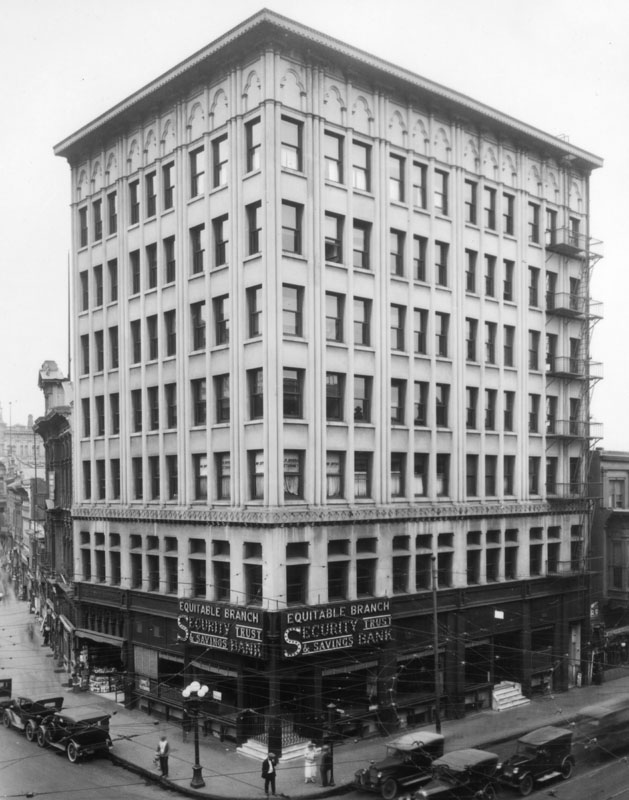
Equitable Savings Bank Building

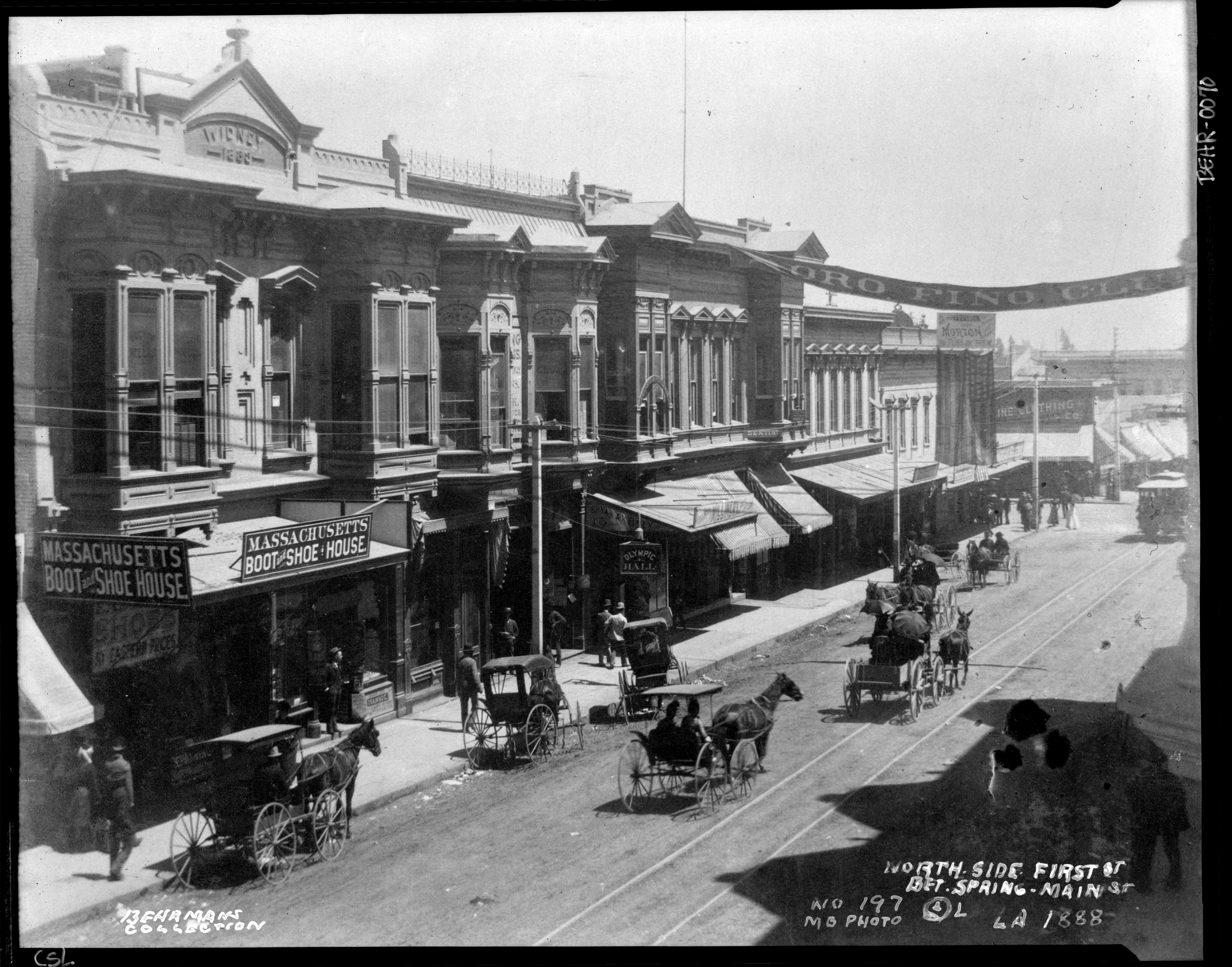
North side of First Street between Spring and Main streets. Widney Block. c.1888
- Los Angeles National Bank Building (1887-1906), demolished and replaced by the
- Equitable Building (Equitable Savings Bank, 1906-1920s)

==== First Street from Spring to Main ====
First Street east of Spring: Widney Block (i.e. Joseph Widney), built in 1883, along the north side. The main Olmsted & Wales bookstore was located in the block in the mid-1880s.

==== Southwest corner of First and Spring ====
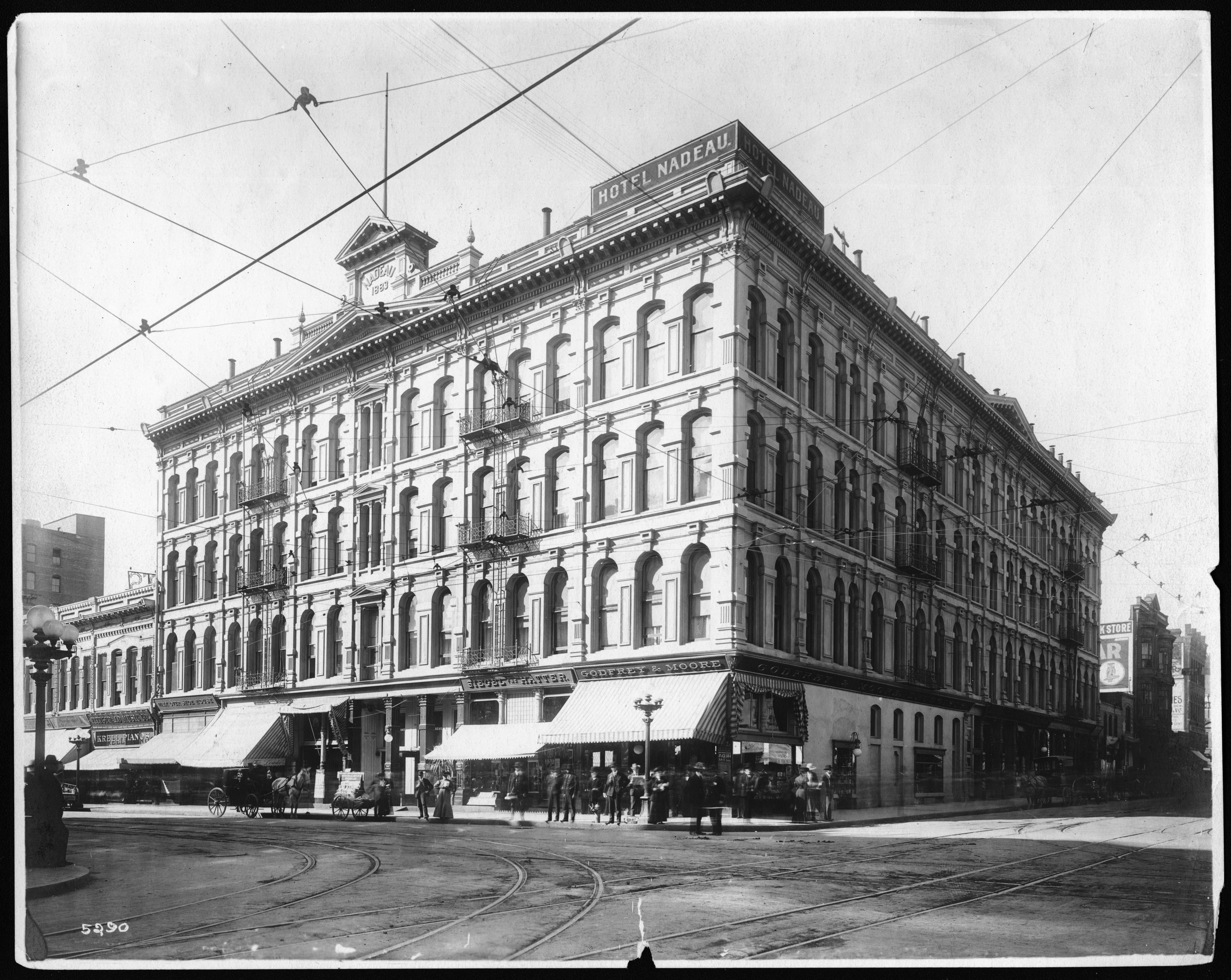
Nadeau Block housing the Nadeau Hotel (1882–1932)

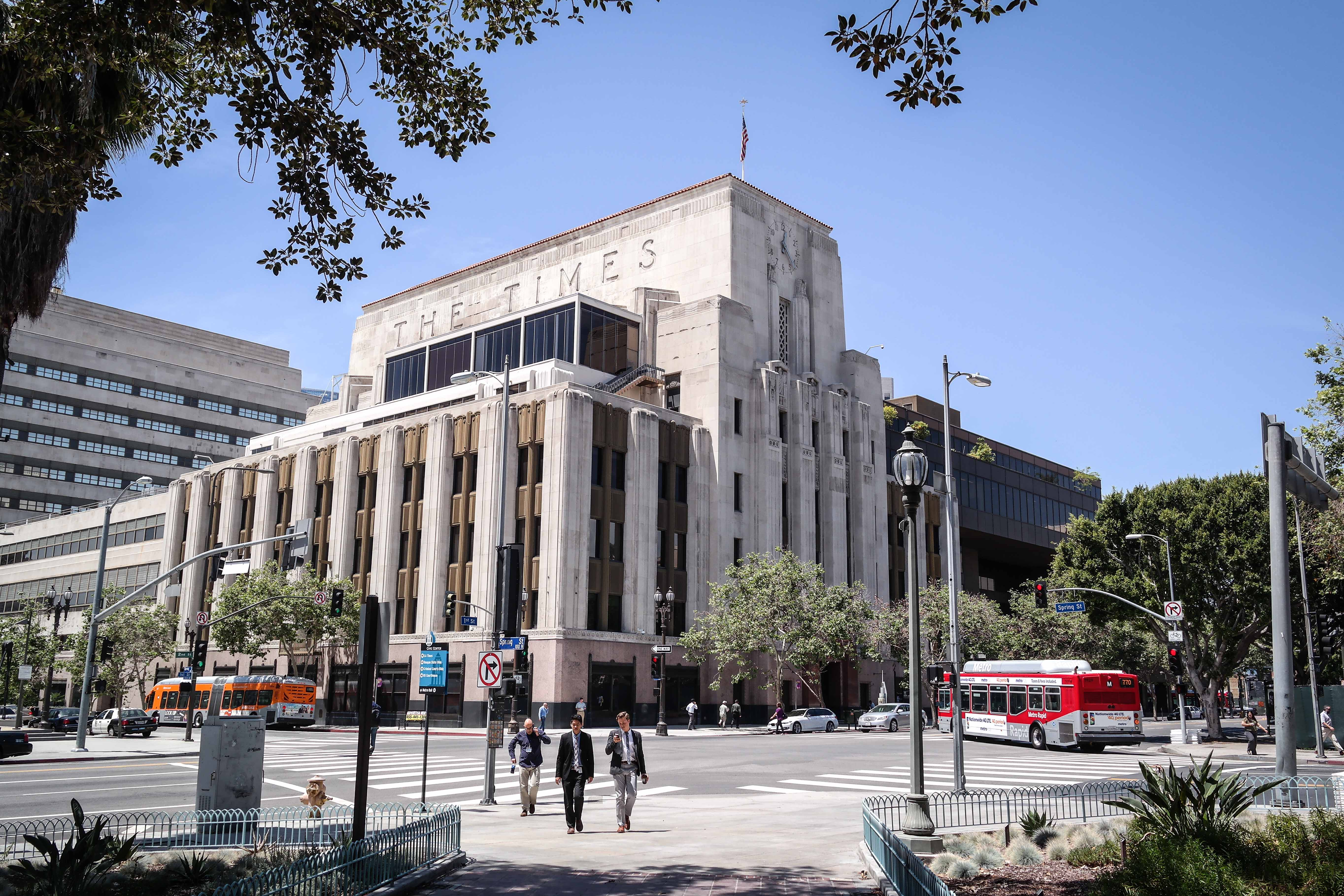
L.A. Times Building, opened 1935, view in 2006.
- Nadeau Block or Nadeau Hotel, built 1881-2, demolished 1932, designed by architects Kysor & Morgan, located at the southwest corner of Spring and First streets. It was the first four-story building in the city.
- This corner is now the site of the Los Angeles Times Building, opened 1935, part of the Times Mirror Square complex taking up the entire block between Spring, Broadway, First and Second streets, formerly the headquarters of the Los Angeles Times, currently vacant.

==== Southeast corner of First and Spring ====
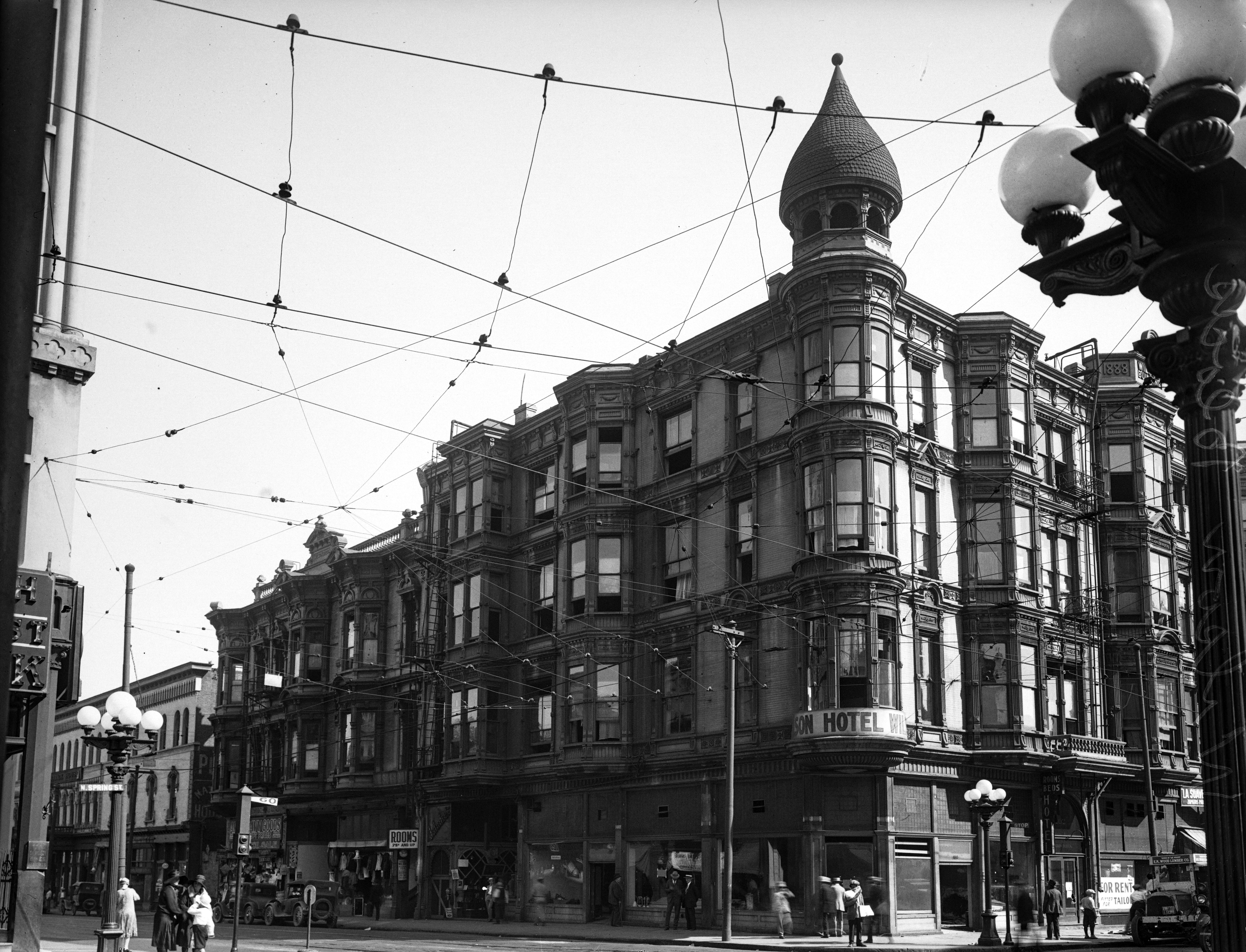
Wilson Block in 1920

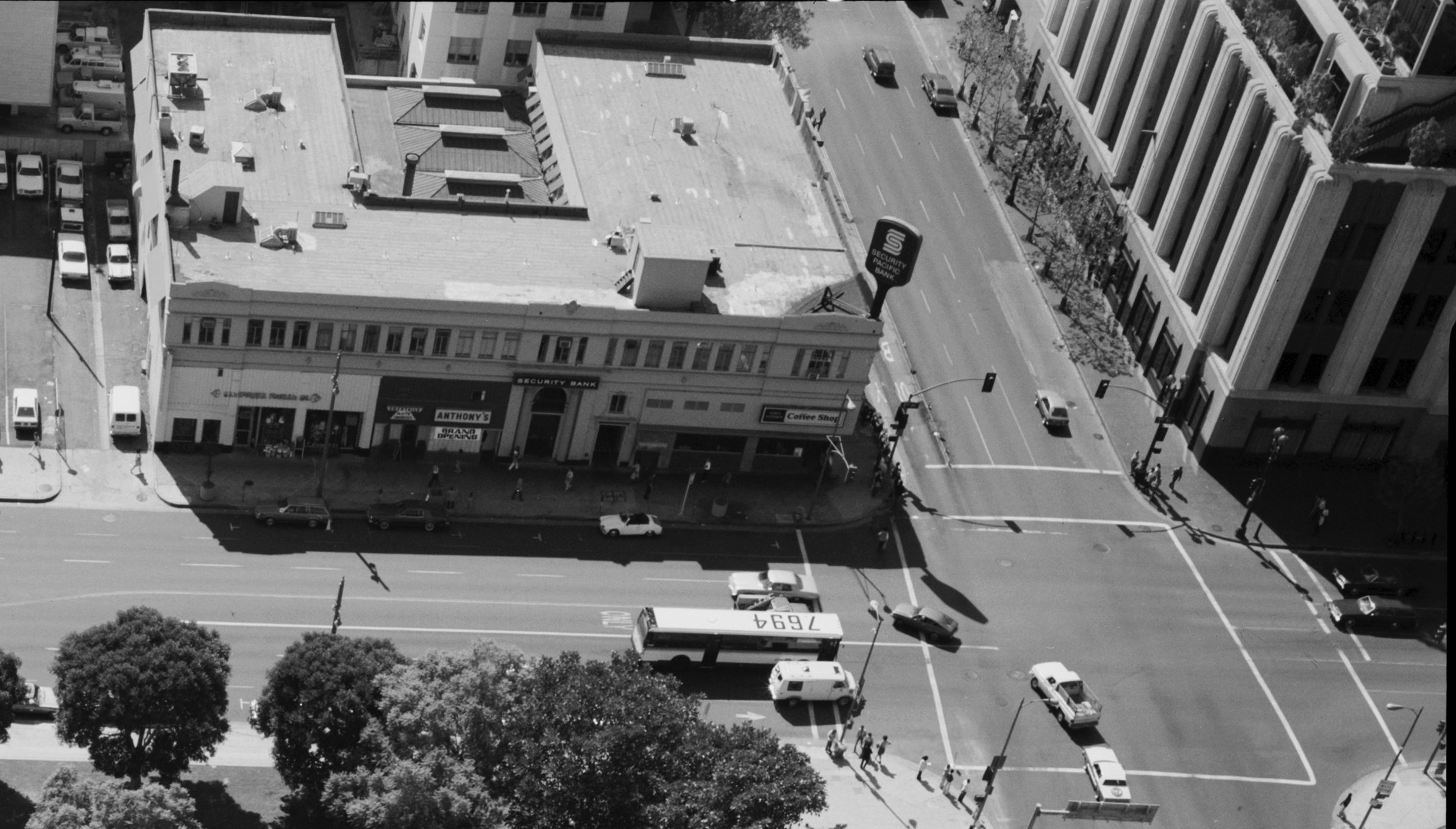
The c.1927 two -story commercial block with the Security Pacific branch, seen from the City Hall tower

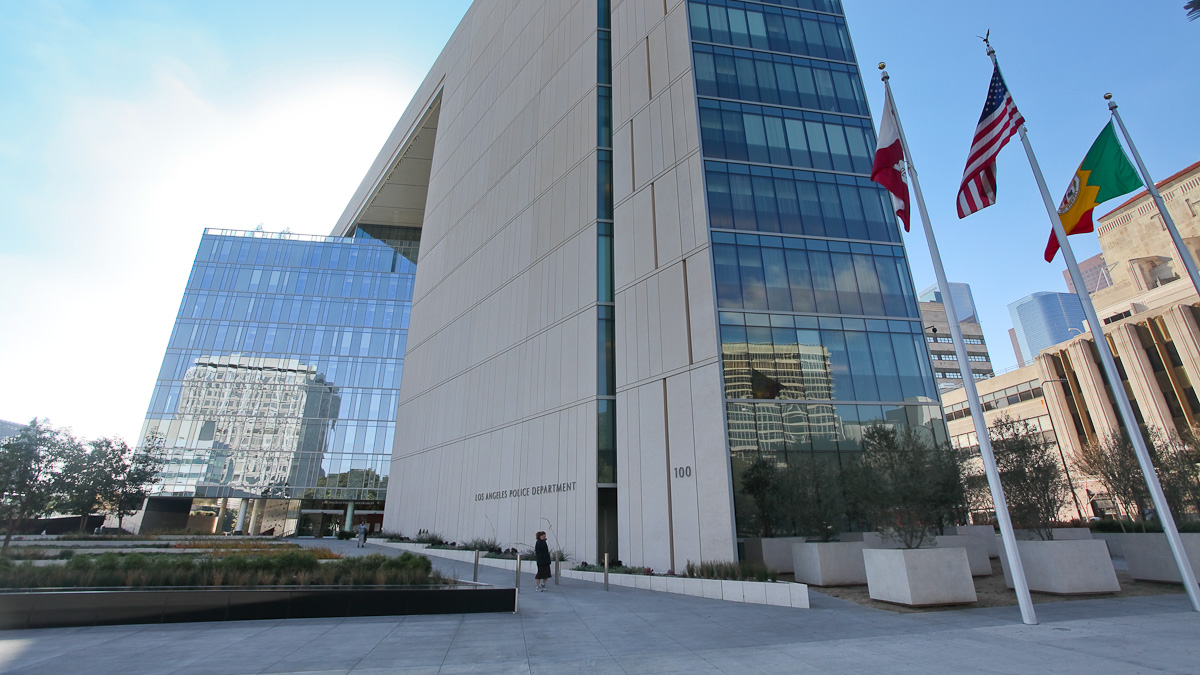
The 2009 L.A.P.D. Headquarters Building

Four buildings have stood here in succession:

- The George S. Wilson homestead
- Wilson Block, sometimes called the city's first skyscraper. Built 1886-8. Demolished around 1927. The corner is now occupied by the Los Angeles Police Department Headquarters Building, completed in 2009. The site is now home to:
- A replacement two-story retail building, home to the "Equitable" branch of Security Pacific National Bank, then the Security Trust and Savings Bank. (the Equitable Building was across the street to the north).
- Since 2009, the Police Headquarters Building taking up the entire block between First, Second, Spring and Main streets.

=== Second and Spring ===
==== Northwest corner of Second and Spring ====
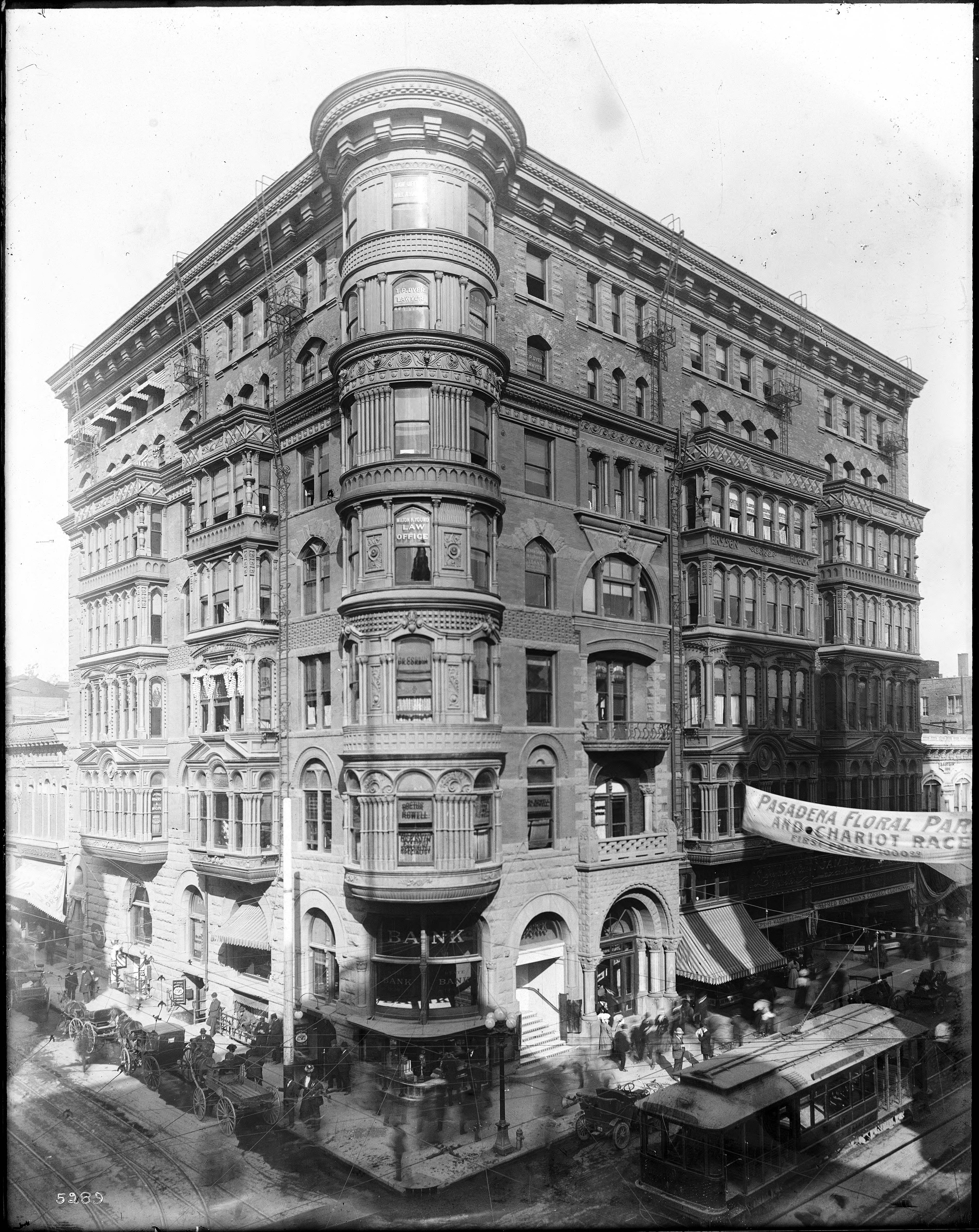
Bryson or Bryson-Bonebrake Block or Building erected 1886-8, photo 1905

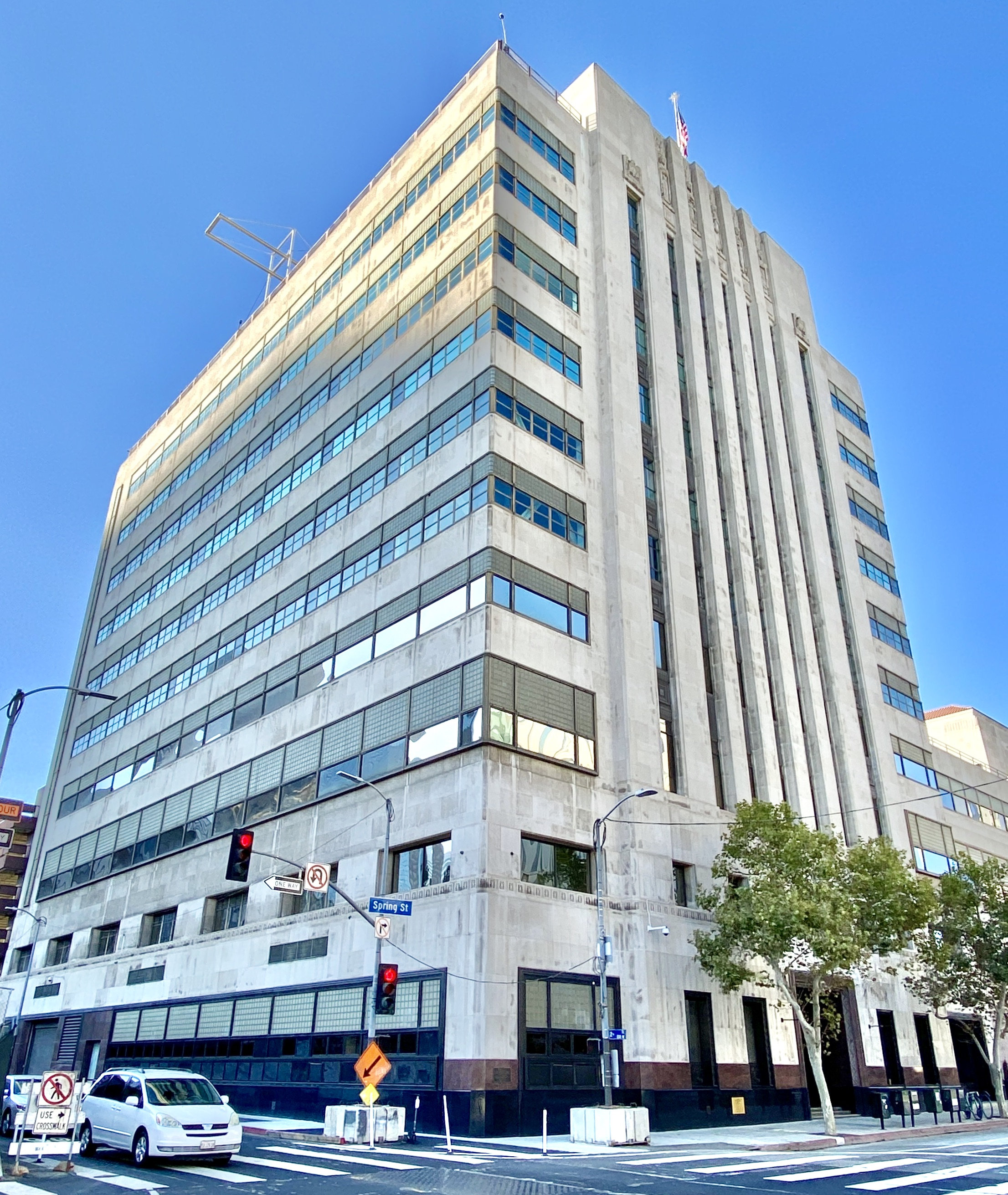
The 1948 "Crawford Addition" building at Times Mirror Square, NW corner of 2nd & Spring, September 2020
- The Bryson Block, also known as the Bryson-Bonebrake Block or Bryson Bonebrake Building, northwest corner 2nd and Spring, constructed 1886-1888 for $224,000 on the site of a public school and an early city hall, as a 126-room bank and office building. Romanesque architecture. Two stories added 1902-1904. Demolished 1934. Architect Joseph Cather Newsom (Newsom & Newsom). Pacific Coast Architecture Database states it was "nothing short of amazing, displaying a riotous and eclectic amalgam of features". Built for mayor John Bryson and Major George H. Bonebrake, President of the Los Angeles National Bank and the State Loan & Trust Co. Desmond's department store was located here from 1890 to 1900.

It was replaced by the 1948 Crawford Addition building, part of the Times Mirror Square complex, currently vacant.

==== Northeast corner of Second and Spring ====
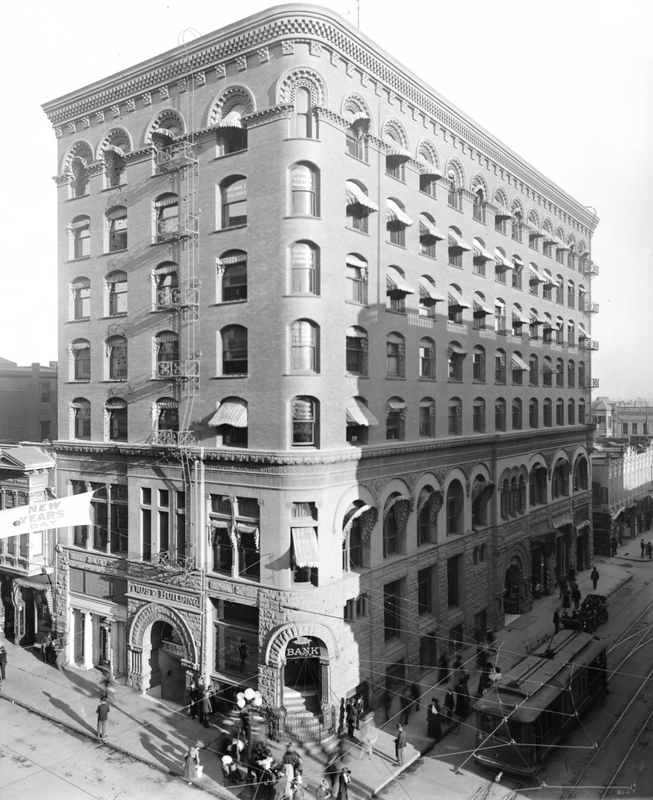
1902 photo of the Burdick Block, on the NE corner of 2nd & Spring, built 1888; top floors added 1900.

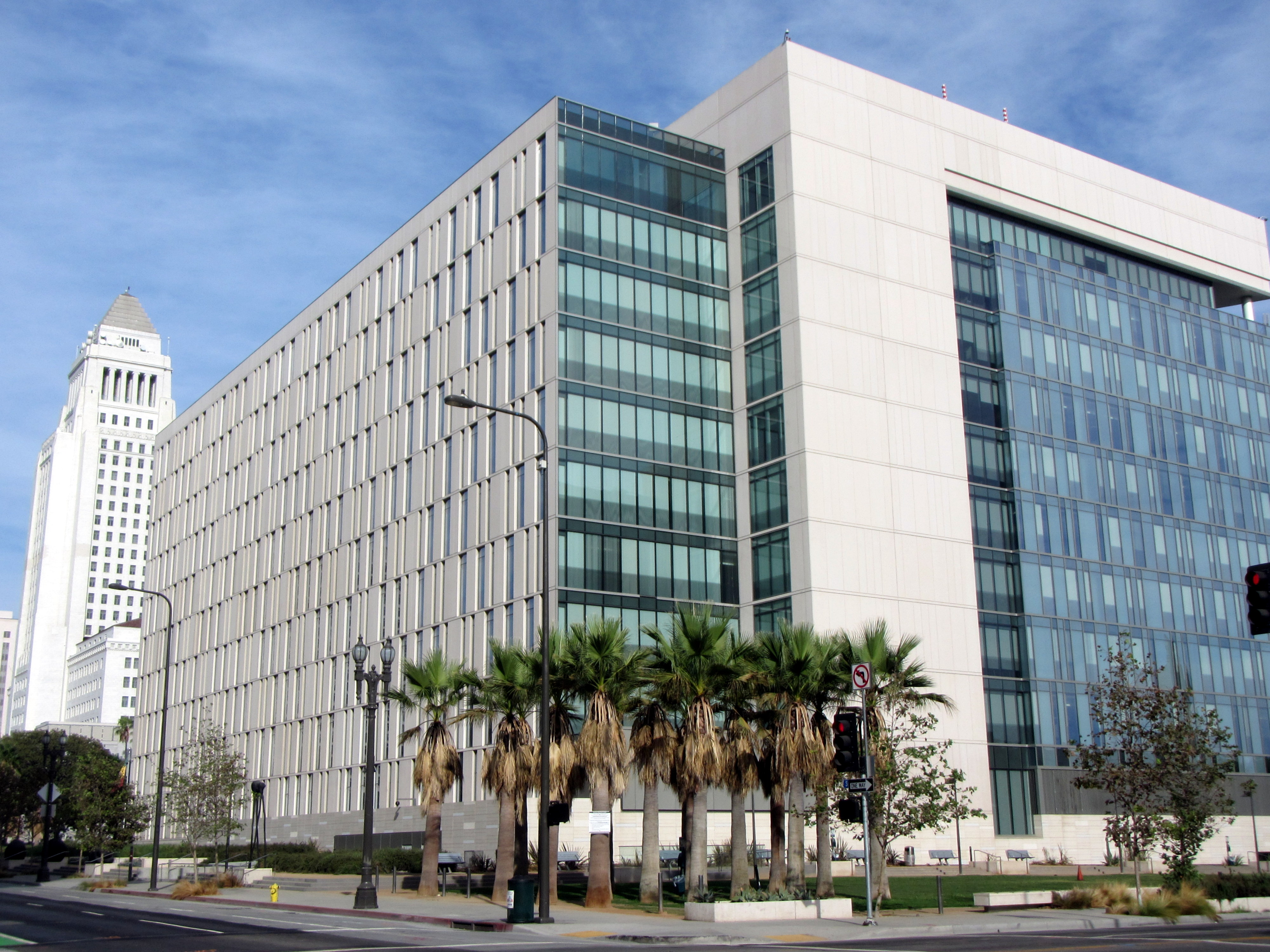
L.A.P.D. Headquarters, opened 2012, NE corner of 2nd & Spring.
- Burdick Block, a.k.a. the Trust Building, 127 W. 2nd St., 1888 (J. N. Preston & Son), top stories added 1900 (John Parkinson). In 1910, refitted and rechristened the American Bank Building. Now site of the Los Angeles Police Department Headquarters which occupies the entire block from First to Second and from Spring to Main, completed 2009.

==== Southwest corner of Second and Spring ====
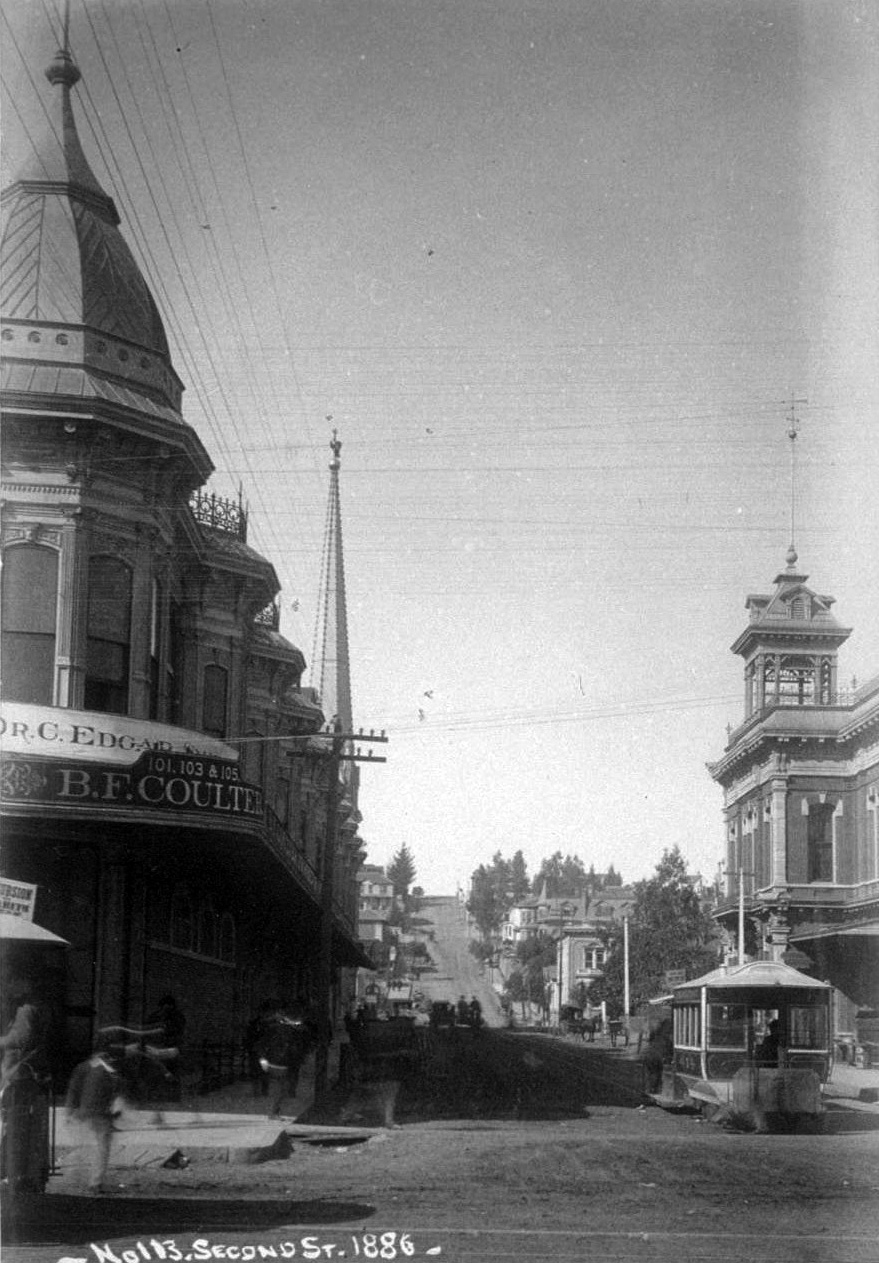
View west on 2nd at Spring. Hollenbeck Block (left) when it was only two stories, note Coulter's store; 2nd City Hall (right), 1886

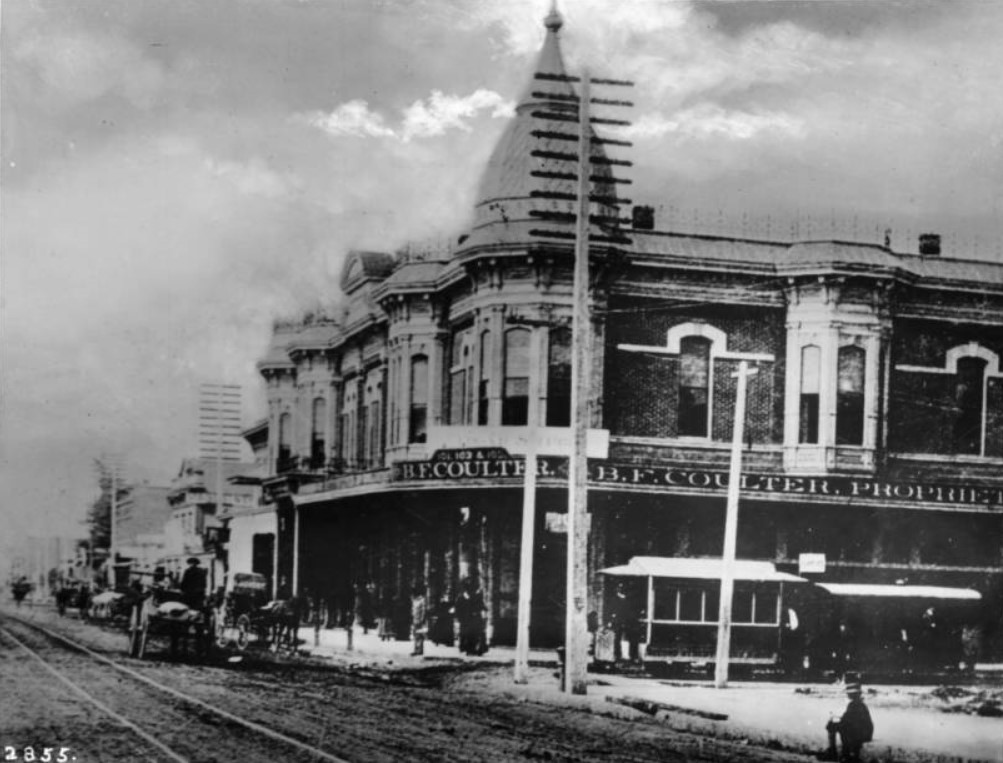
View south on Spring at 2nd, Hollenbeck Block when it was two stories, Coulter's store, 1886

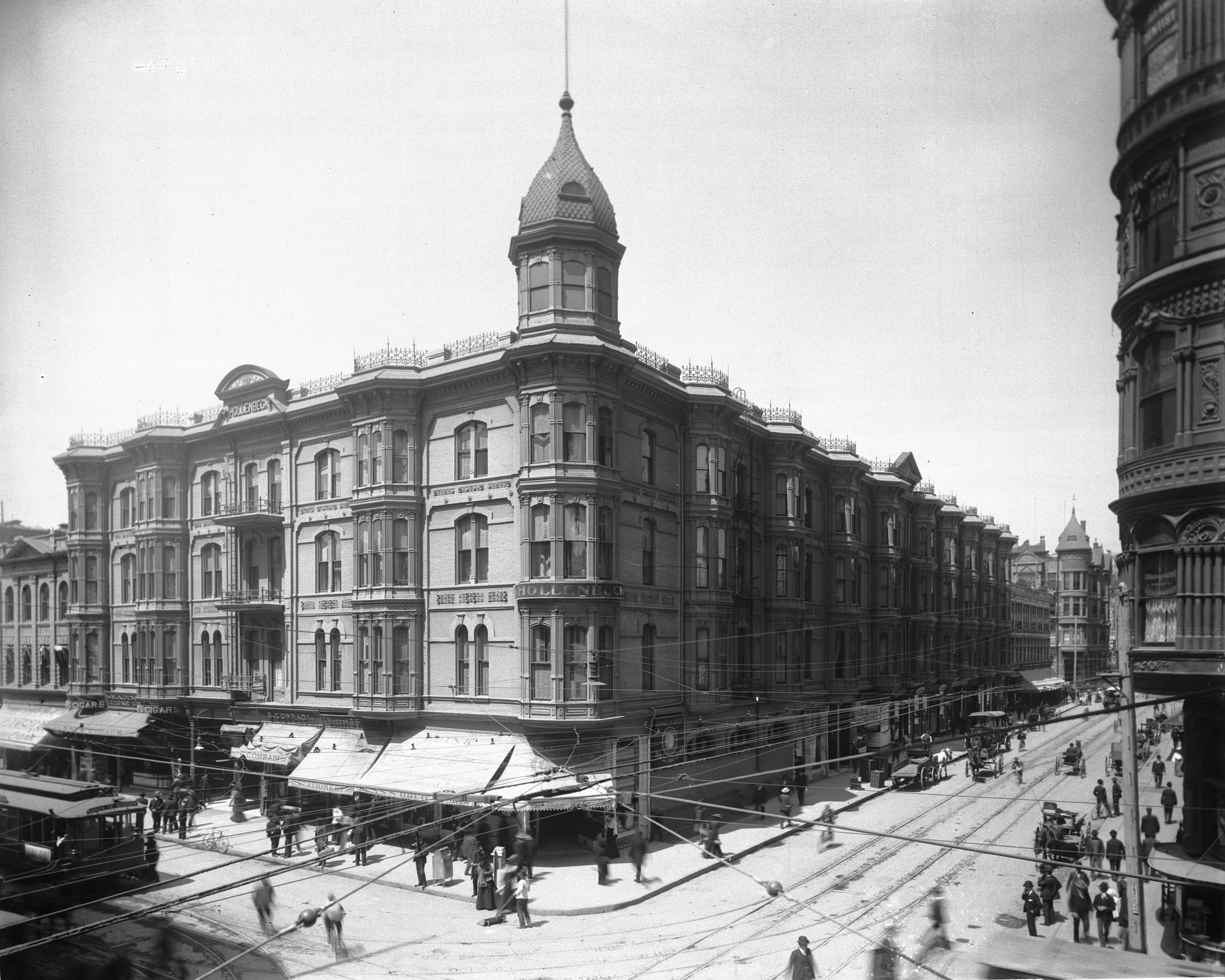
Hollenbeck Block (1884-1933), SW corner of 2nd & Spring. c.1900-1905.

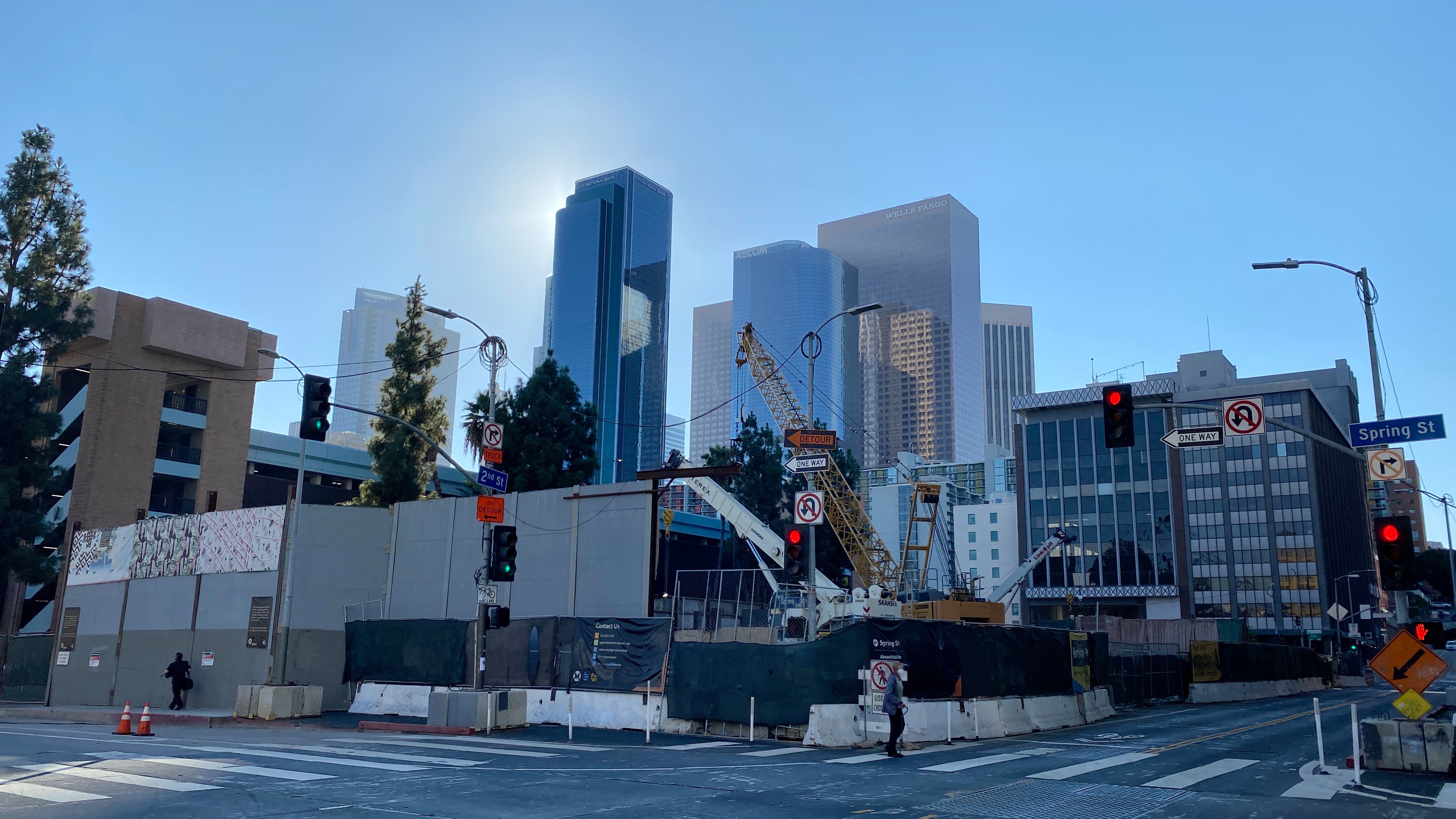
Historic Broadway station under construction, September 2020

- The Hollenbeck Block was located on the southwest corner of Spring and Second streets. It was built in 1884 by John Edward Hollenbeck and housed the Hollenbeck Hotel and, on the corner, from 1884–1898, Coulter's 6,000 sq ft (560 m^{2}) store, which would become a leading Los Angeles department store. Built 1884, demolished in 1933. Architect Robert Brown Young. Currently the construction site of Historic Broadway station, an underground station of the Los Angeles Metro Rail light rail subway.

==== Southeast corner of Second and Spring ====
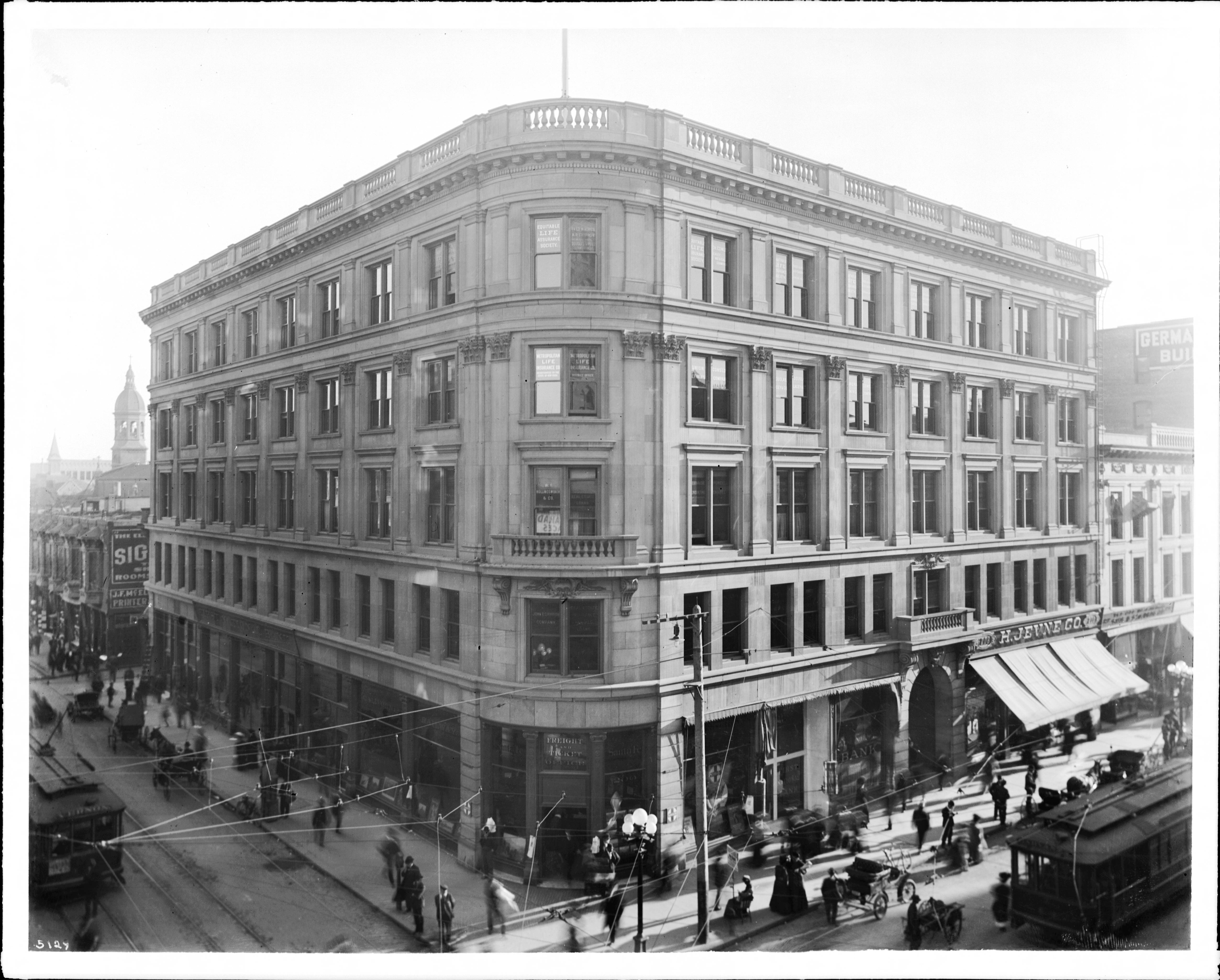
Wilcox Building, built 1895-6, photo from 1905

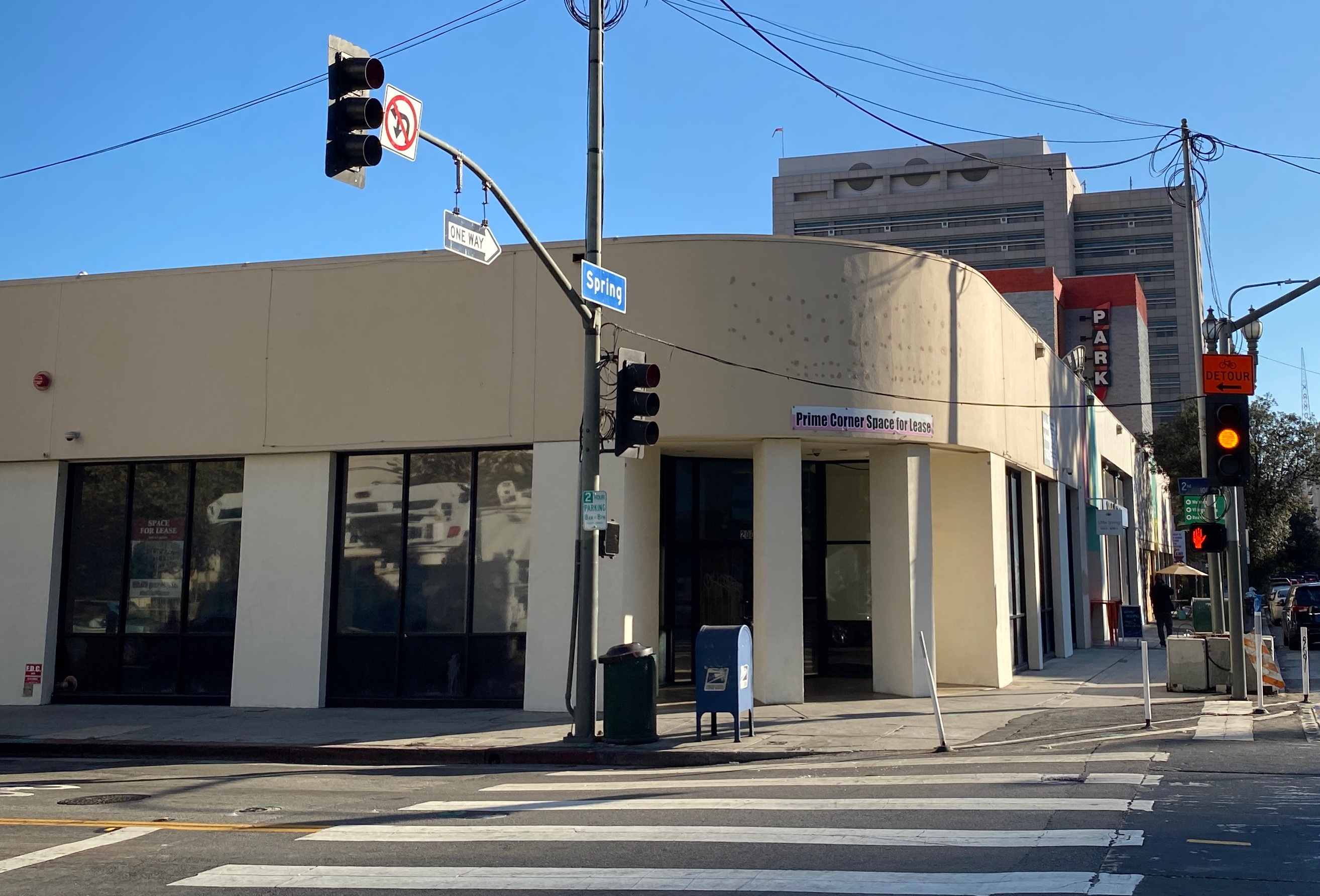
The Wilcox Building in September 2020

- Wilcox Building, built 1895-6, architects Pissis and Moore, five stories. All but the ground floor were removed in 1971 after damage from the 1971 Sylmar earthquake. It housed the larger of two branches of the H. Jevne & Co. gourmet grocery store, as well as the California Club until 1904, when the latter moved to Fourth and Hill streets. The Southwestern School of Law was on its top floors 1915–1924.

=== 200 block ===
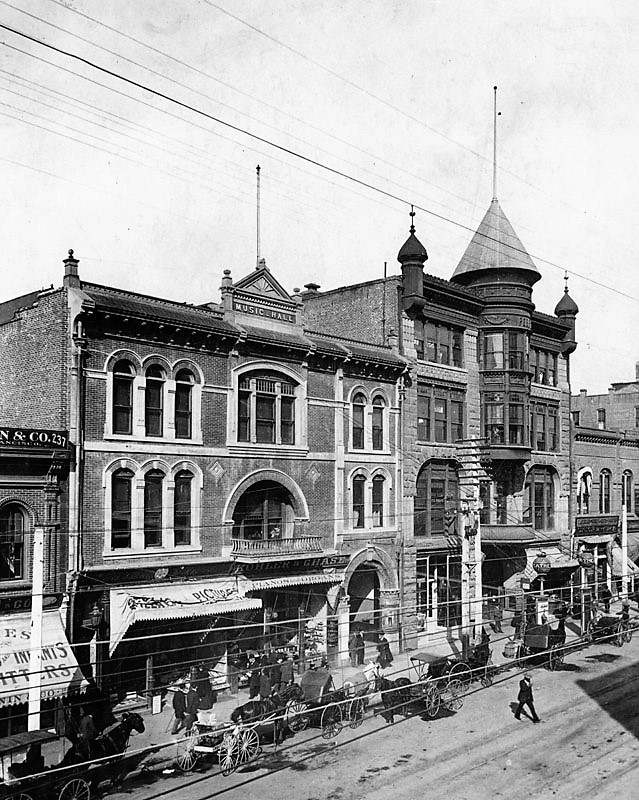
Music (Turnverein) Hall (l) and Los Angeles (Lyceum) Theatre (r). West side of Spring between 2nd and 3rd, 1895.

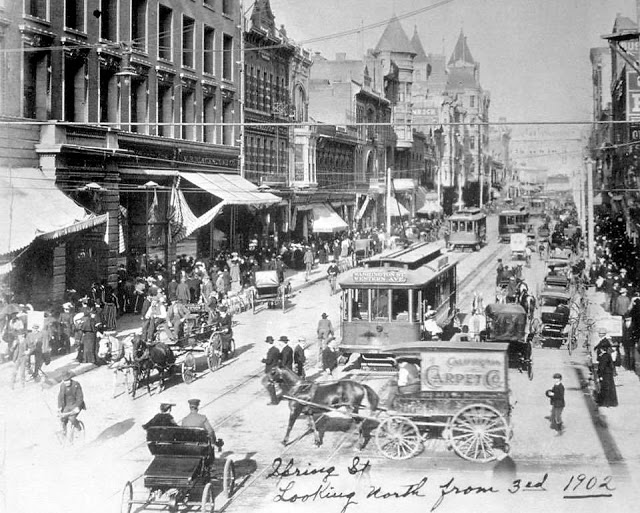
Looking north on Spring from 3rd St., 1902

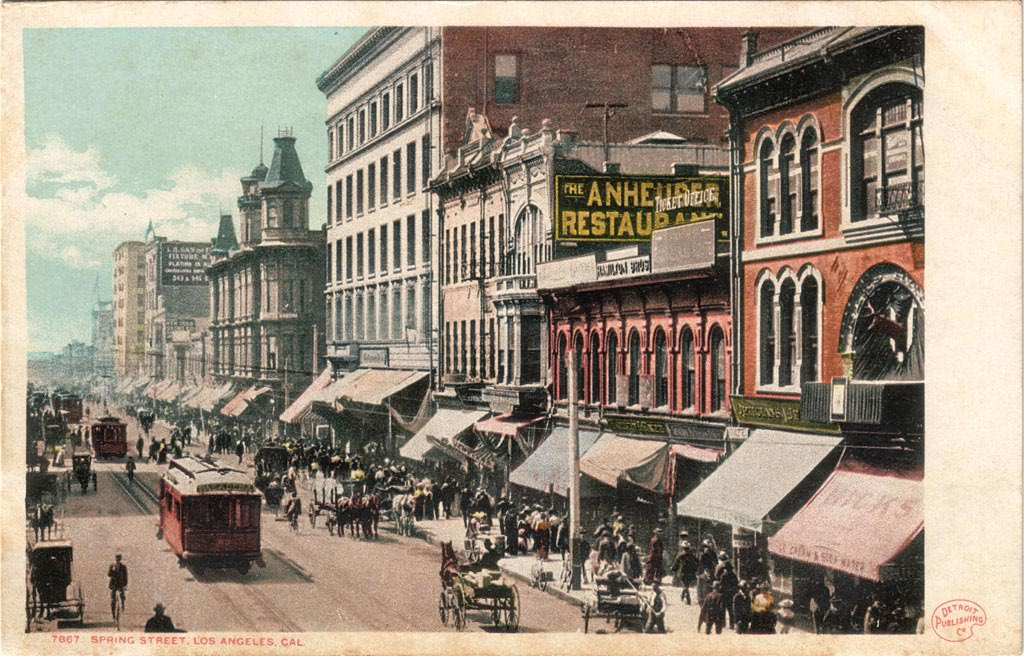
Looking south on Spring between 2nd and 3rd, c.1905. In the background at center: towers of the Hotel Ramona. To its right, the Douglas Building, Woollacott Block, Anheuser restaurant, Hamilton Bros. shoe store block, and portion of the Turnverein Hall

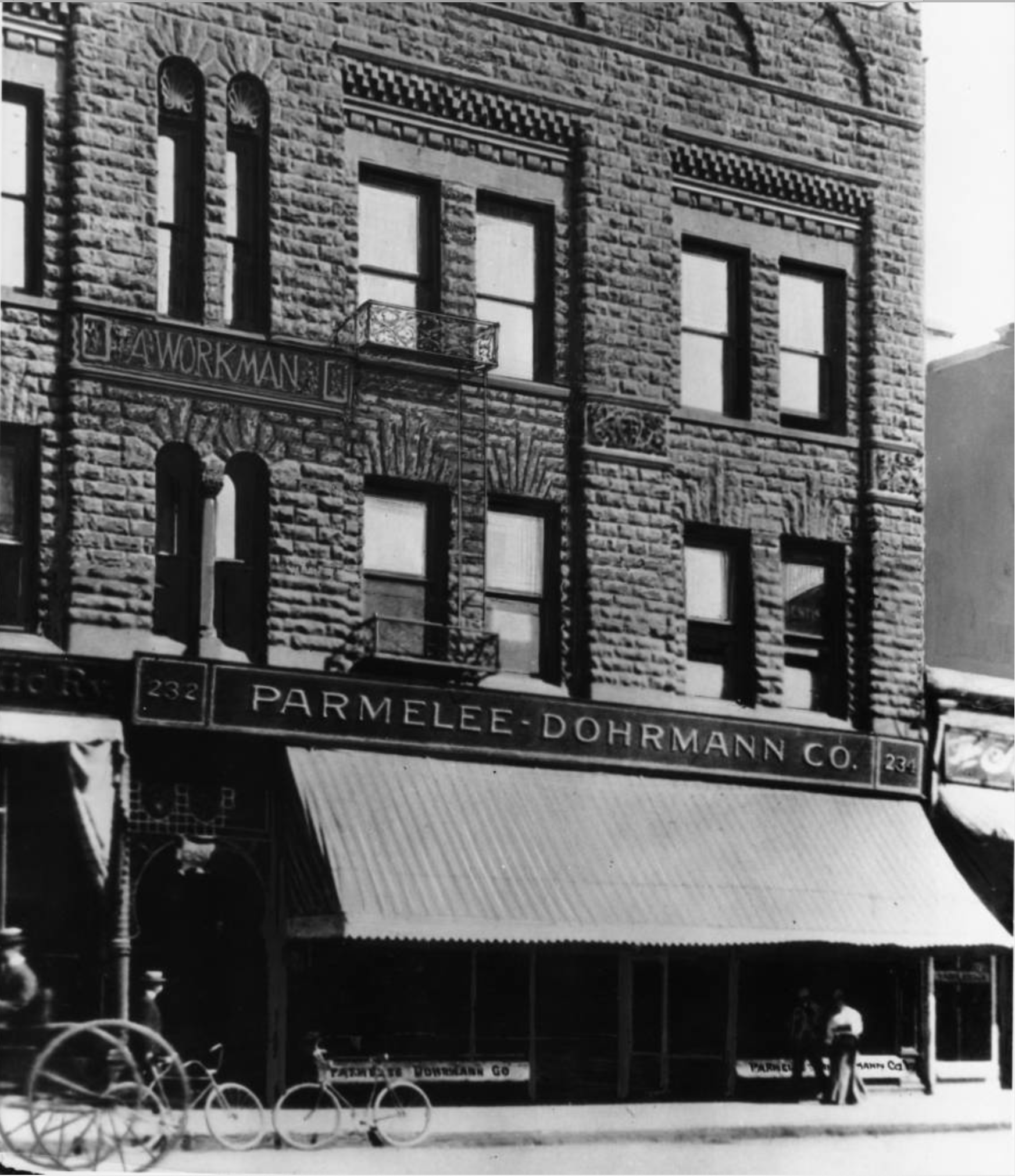
Parmelee-Dohrmann store at the Workman Block, 232–234 S. Spring, photo c.1900-1906

On the west side:

- #217 (pre-1890 numbering: #119), the Parisian Cloak and Suit Co., 1888–1892; then 221 S. Spring until 1899. One of the city's prominent retailers of women's clothing during that era.

Two theatres together called the Perry Buildings:

- at #225–9 was the Lyceum Theatre, opened in 1888 as the Los Angeles Theatre (not to be confused with the Los Angeles Theatre on Broadway, still standing). From 1903-1911 this venue operated as the Orpheum Theatre. As the Orpheum Circuit was a chain and changed venues several times, the "Orpheum Theatre" in Los Angeles was first at the Grand Opera House venue on Main Street, then at this venue, and finally at the venue now known as the Palace Theatre on Broadway.
- at #231–5 was the Turnverein Hall (opened 1879), a theatre, renamed the Music Hall in 1894, Elks Hall in the early 1900s and Lyceum Hall in 1915. Demolished.
- #237–241, Hamilton Bros. block, Hamilton Bros. (later Hamilton & Baker, C. H. Baker) shoe store at #239.
- #243, Anheuser-Busch saloon, later known as The Anheuser Restaurant.
- #245–7, Woollacott Block

On the east side:

- Stowell Block at #224–228. In 1894 the Los Angeles Athletic Club was located here from 1893 until 1895.
- Workman Block at #230–234. 232–234 were home to Parmelee-Dohrmann from 1899 through 1906. It was the city's premier store for china, crystal and silver, as well as — at that time — selling appliances like stoves and refrigerators. In 1906, the store moved to the 5th and Broadway area.

=== Third and Spring ===
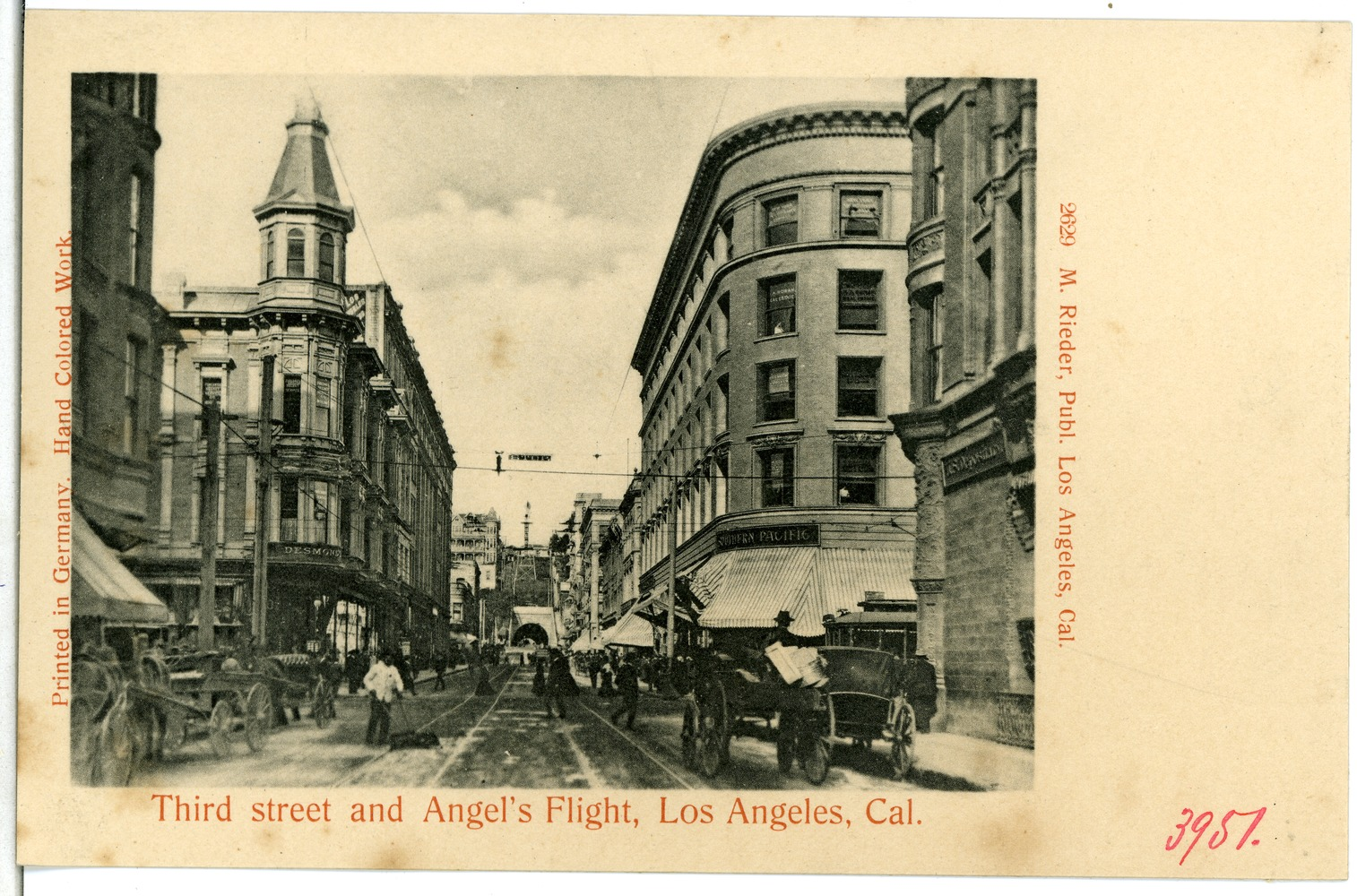
1903, looking west on Third past Spring: Desmond's store located 1900–1906 in the turreted Ramona Block on the SW corner, left, and Southern Pacific Railroad office in the Douglas Building, still standing today, on the NW corner, right. At far background, Angel's Flight at 3rd and Hill.

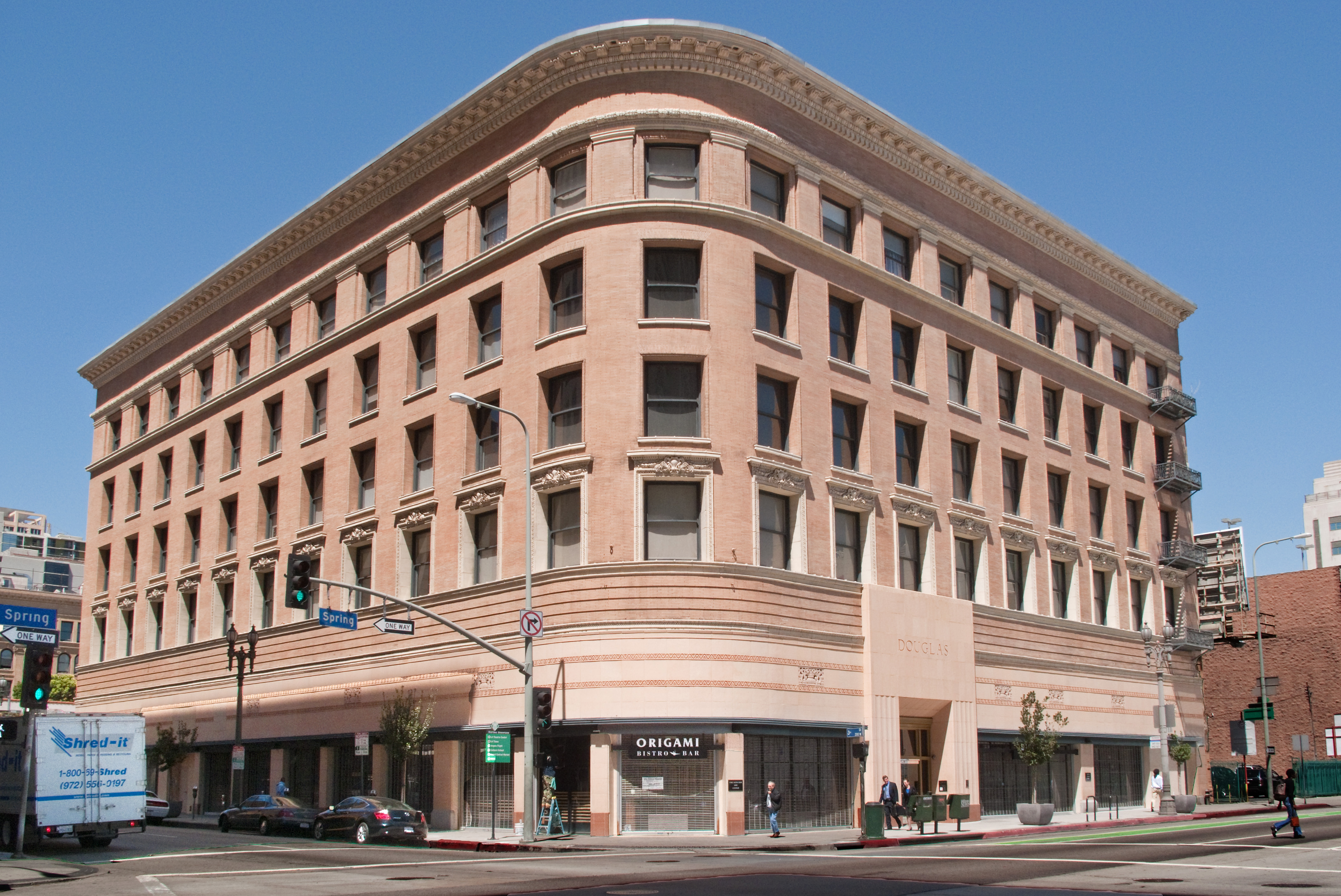
Douglas Building (1899– ), NW corner

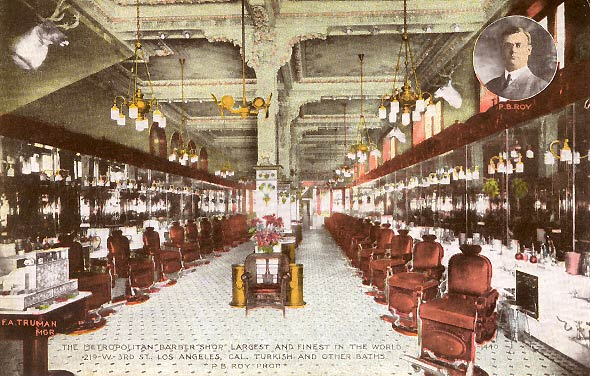
Metropolitan Barber Shop, 215 W. 3rd (demolished)

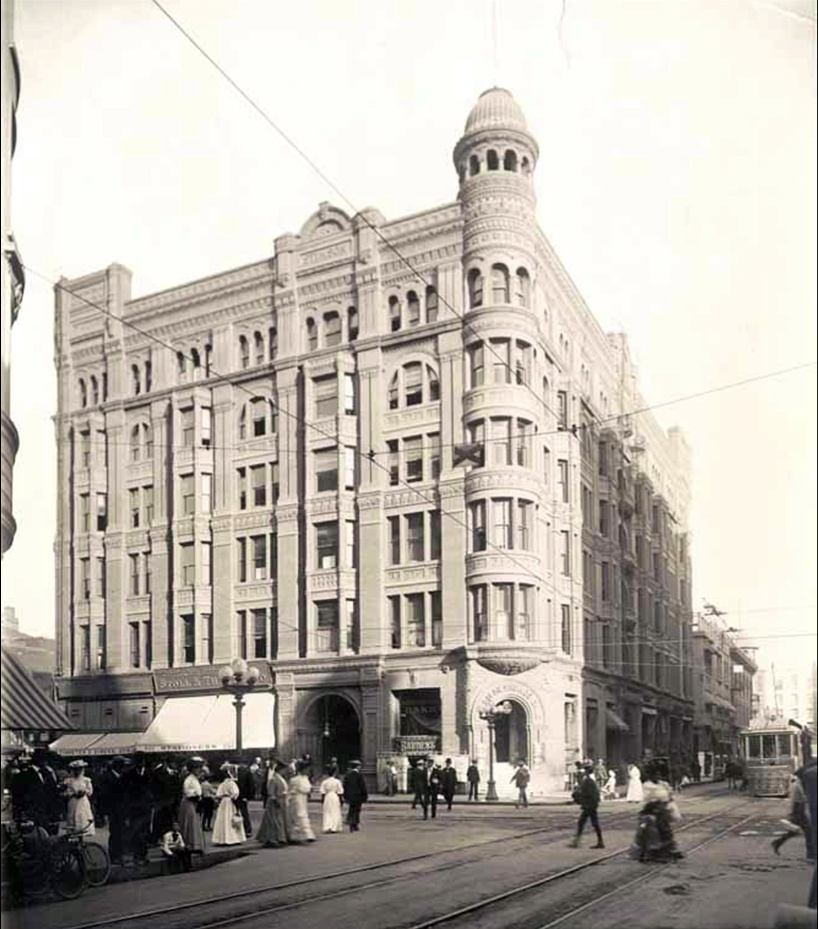
Stimson Block, NE corner (1893–1963)

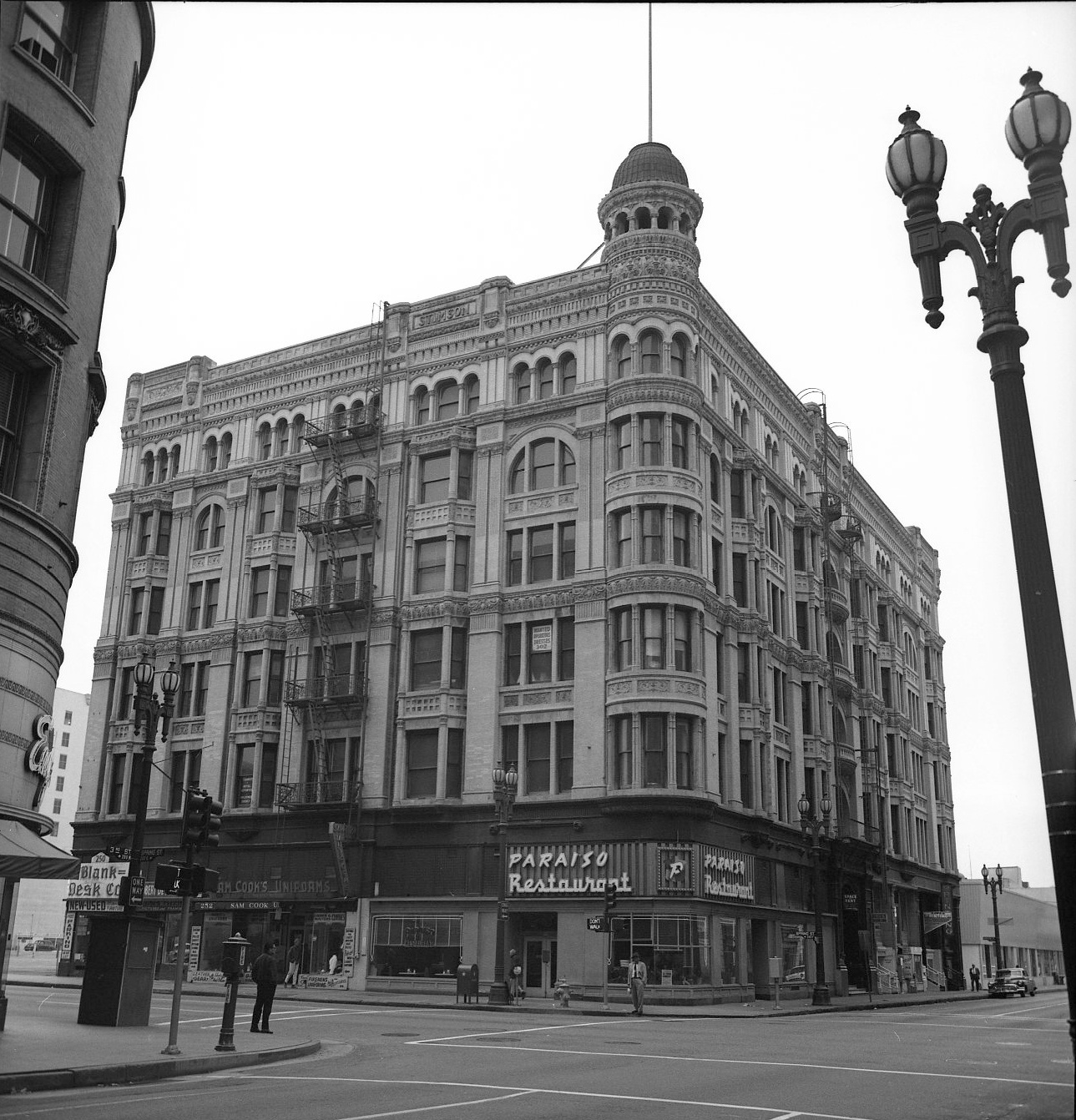
Stimson Block in the mid-20th century

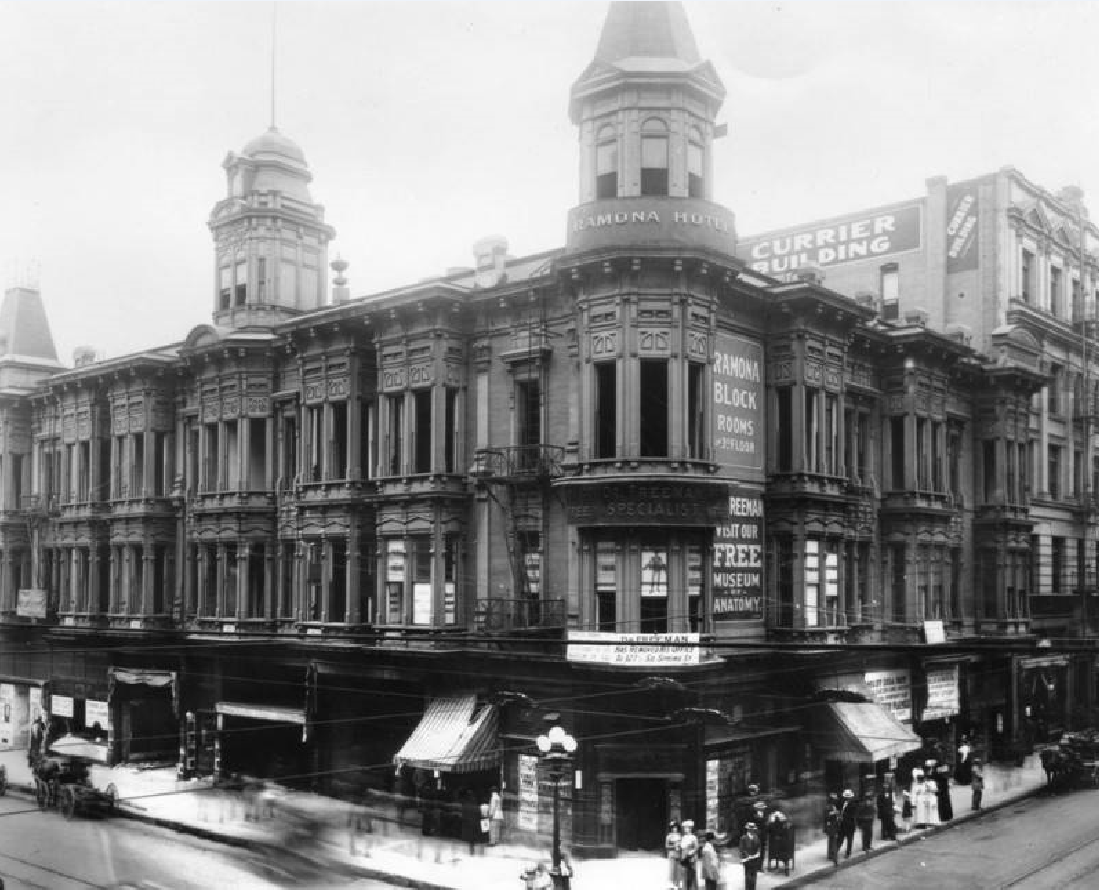
Hotel Ramona, SW corner (1885–1903)

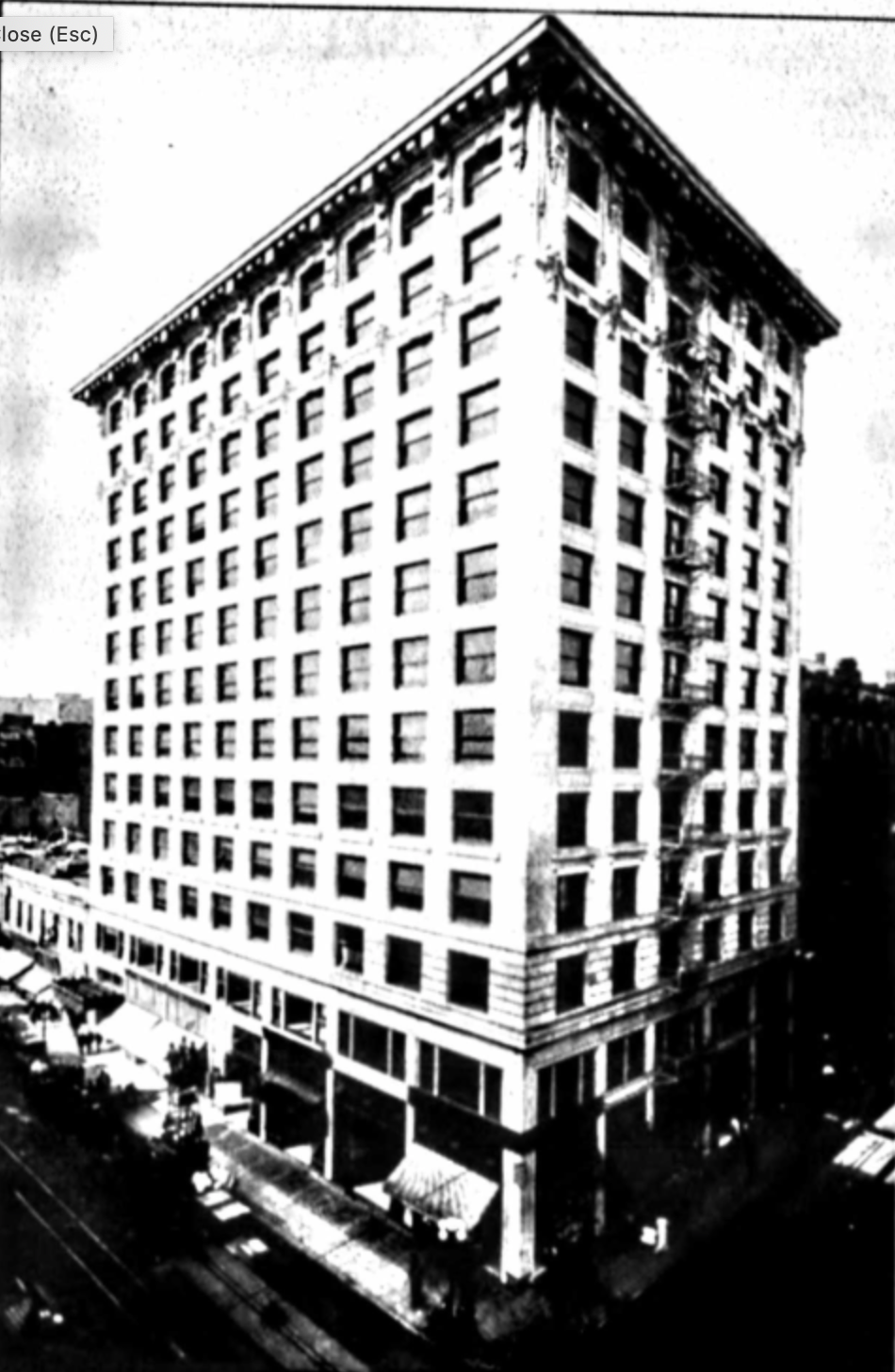
Washington Bldg. (1912) at SW corner

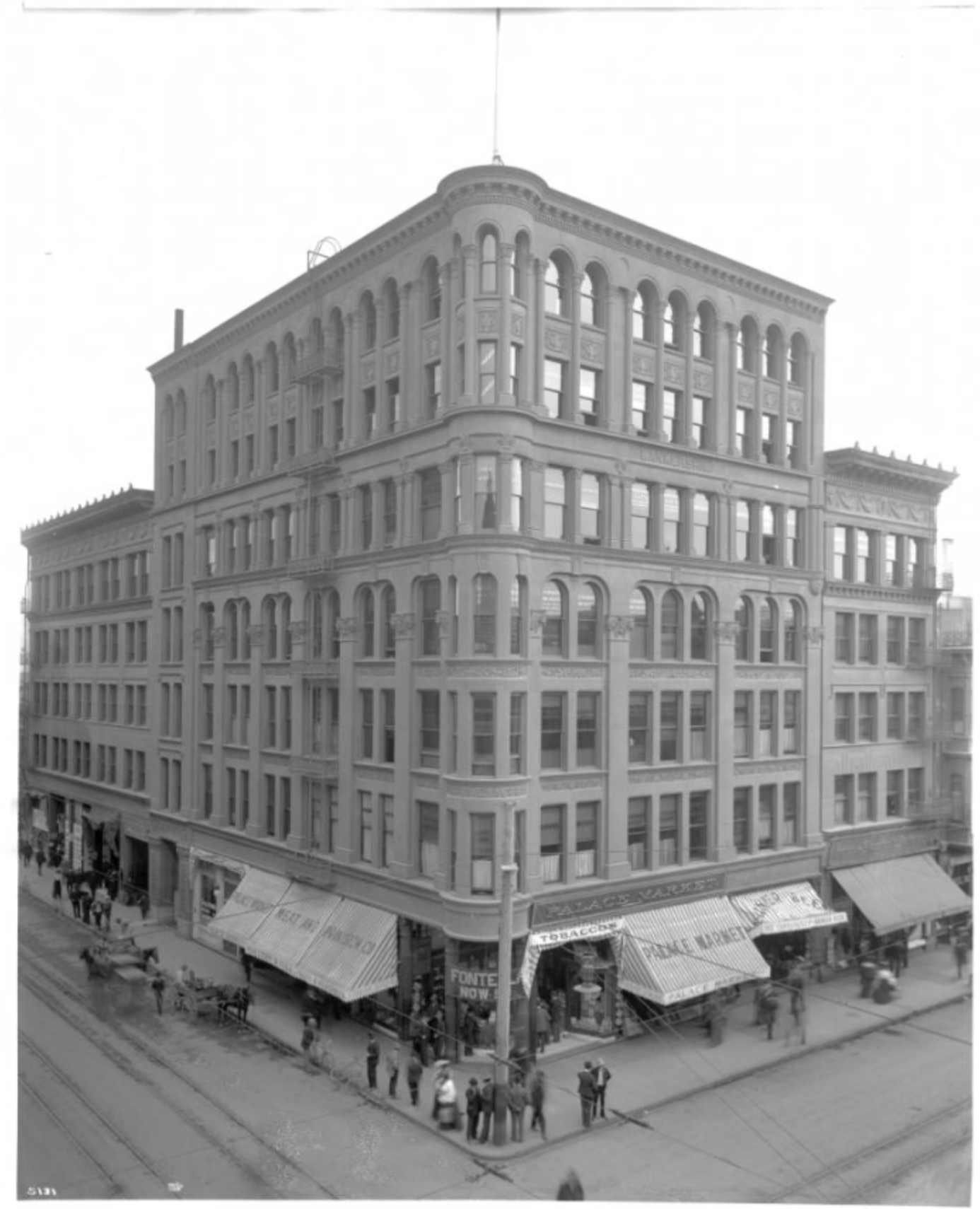
Lankershim Building (1896–1959), SE corner

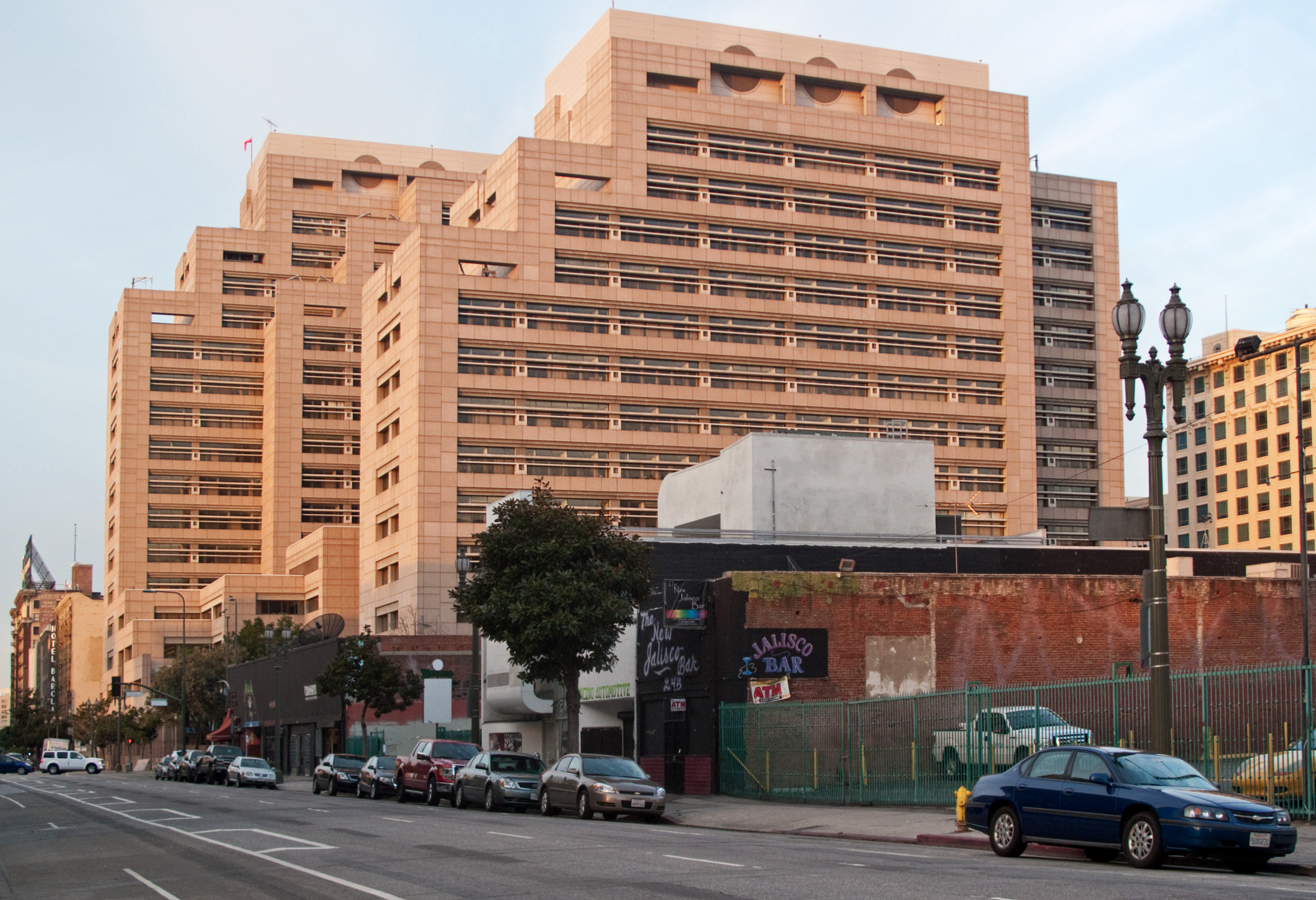
Ronald Reagan State Office Bldg. occupies the SE corner of 3rd & Spring today. Spring runs along its right side; this view looks south on Main St.

==== Northwest corner of Third and Spring ====
- Hammel and Denker Block (opened 1890, demolished 1899); Henry Hammel and Andrew H. Denker were business partners in hotels and ranching. Thomas Douglas Stimson bought it in 1893, thus owning two buildings at this intersection: this one and the Stimson Block (see below). Leading dry goods retailer Frank, Grey & Co. opened here in 1890 and the store was later taken bought by, and turned into a branch of J. M. Hale.
- The Hammel & Denker Block was demolished and replaced by the Douglas Block in 1899 and still standing, now condos.
- To the west of the Douglas Block stood the Metropolitan Barber Shop, originally at 214 W. 3rd, in 1908 it moved to 215-9 W. 3rd. The Los Angeles Herald claimed it to be the largest barber shop in the world at that time and the most expensive ever constructed, with 30 chairs, chandeliers and mahogany furnishings.

==== Northeast corner of Third and Spring ====
- Stimson Block or Stimson Building, built 1893, architect Carroll H. Brown (also designed the Stimson House), demolished 1963. The city's tallest building when it opened. Built for lumber magnate Thomas Douglas Stimson. Now site of a parking lot.

==== Southwest corner of Third and Spring ====
- The Callaghan Block or Ramona Block housing the Hotel Ramona, (1885, Burgess J. Reeve, classic bay-windowed style). Demolished in 1903 and replaced by the Washington Building, built 1912, Parkinson and Bergstrom, still standing.

==== Southeast corner of Third and Spring ====
- Site of the Lankershim Building (1896-7, Robert Brown Young, demolished 1959). Now the site of the Ronald Reagan State Building.

=== Main Street ===
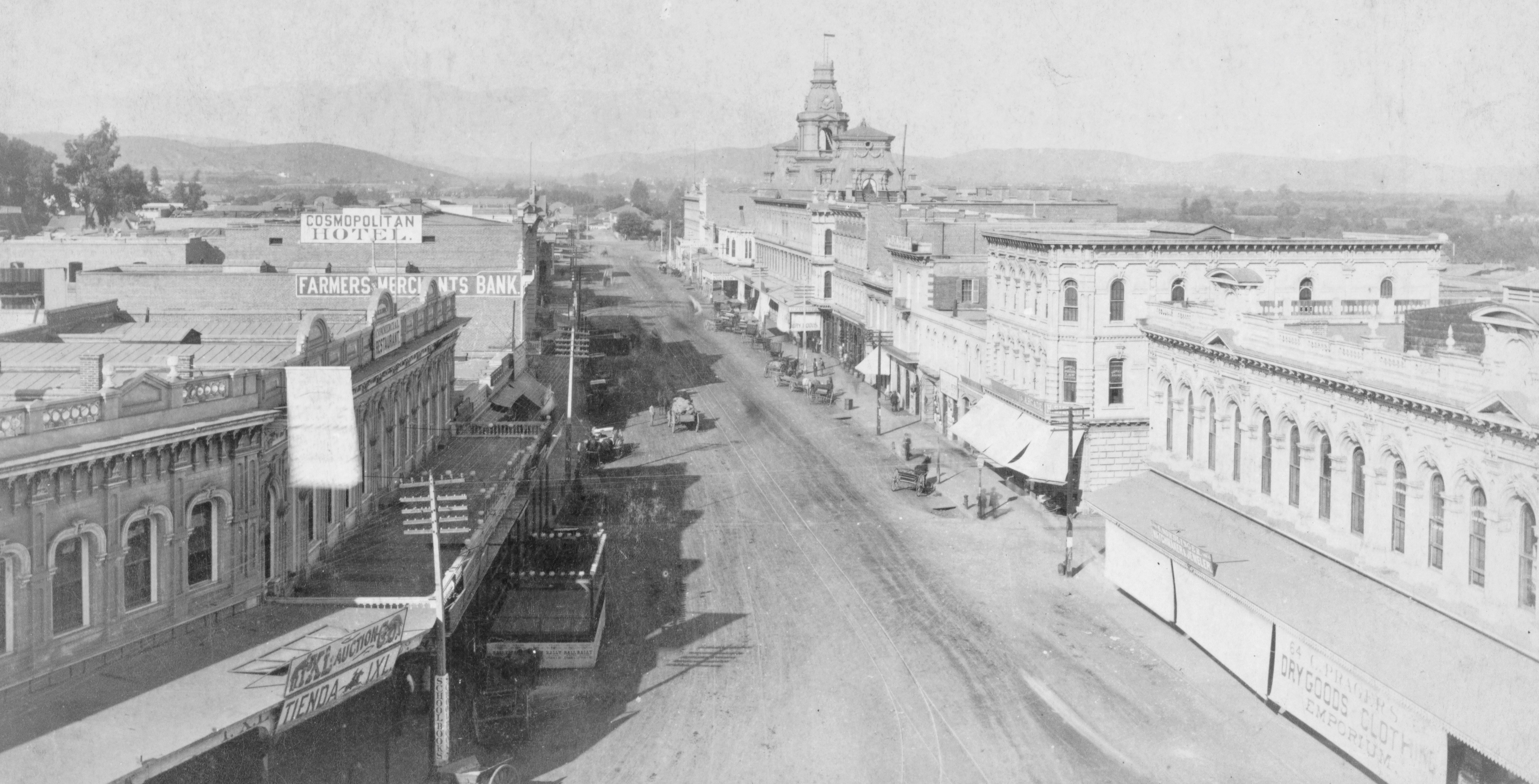
Main Street looking north from Temple, photo by T.E. Stanton, 1886. The Baker Block is the prominent building towards the back. Left side: Cosmopolitan Hotel, Farmers and Merchants Bank , Downey Block with Commercial Restaurant.

=== Main from Plaza south to Arcadia ===
==== Gallery (west side) ====
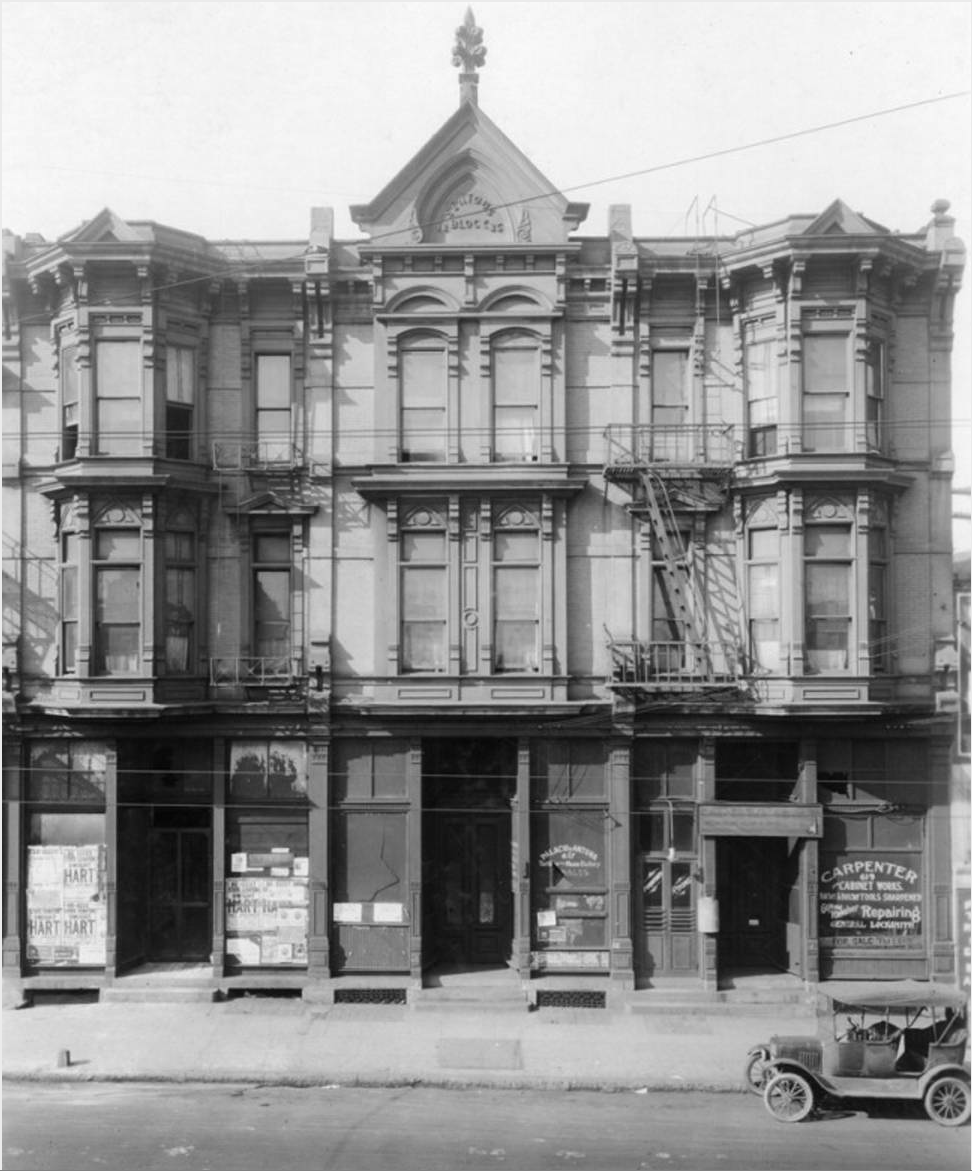
Sentous Block a.k.a. Sentous Building, 1920

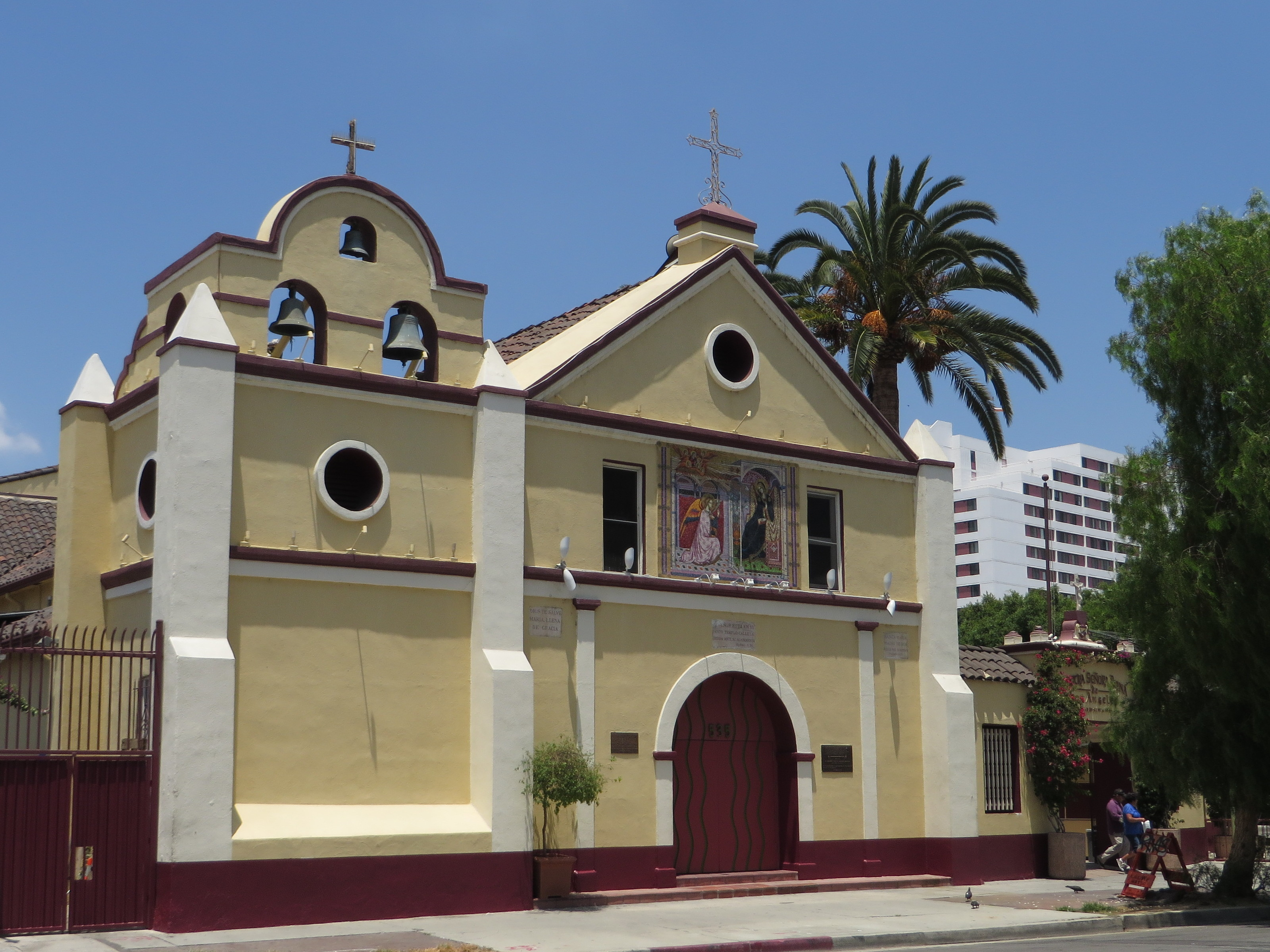
La Placita Church (La Iglesia de Nuestra Señora la Reina de los Ángeles)

Vickrey-Brunswig Building

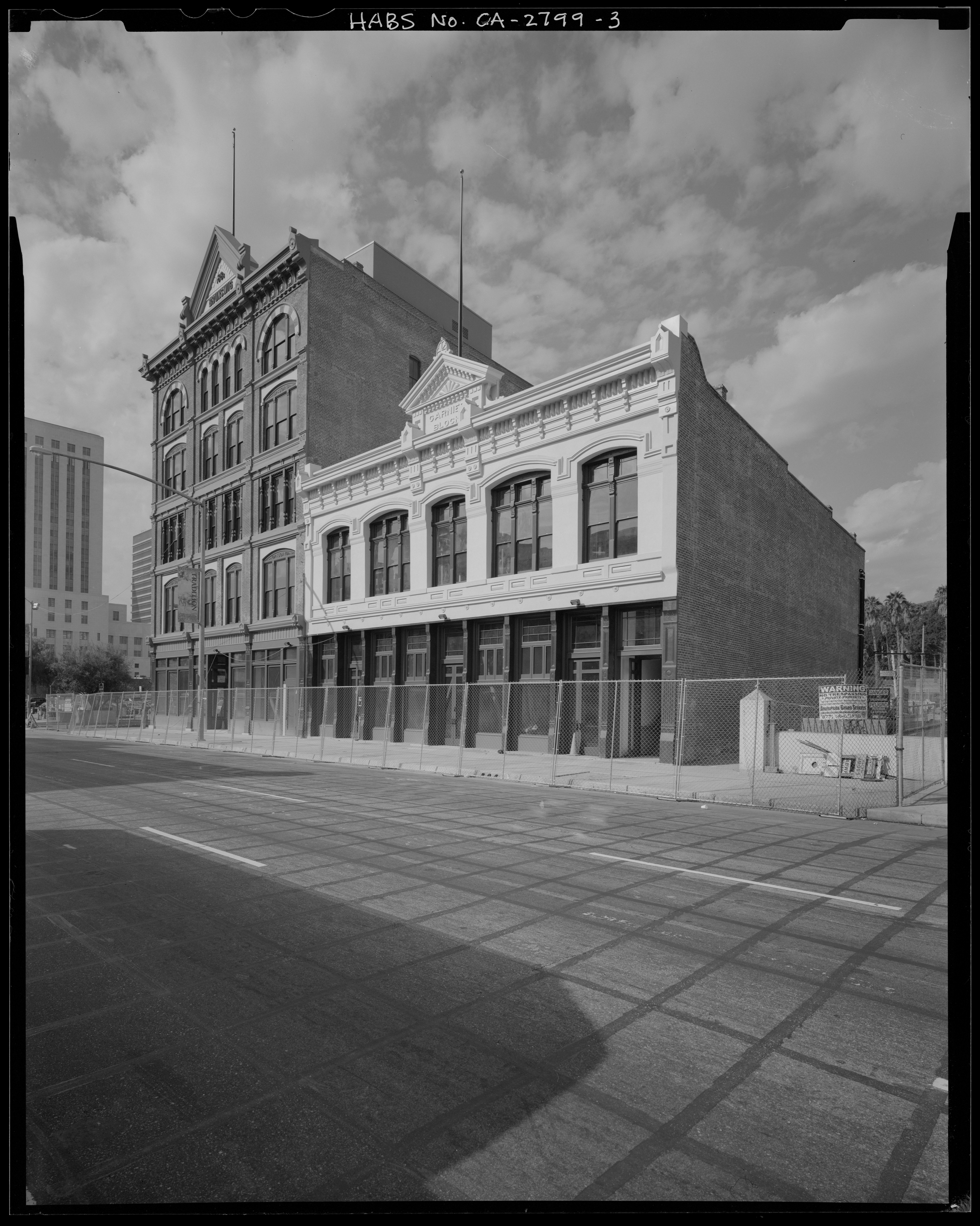
Vickrey-Brunswig Building and Plaza House

==== Gallery (east side) ====
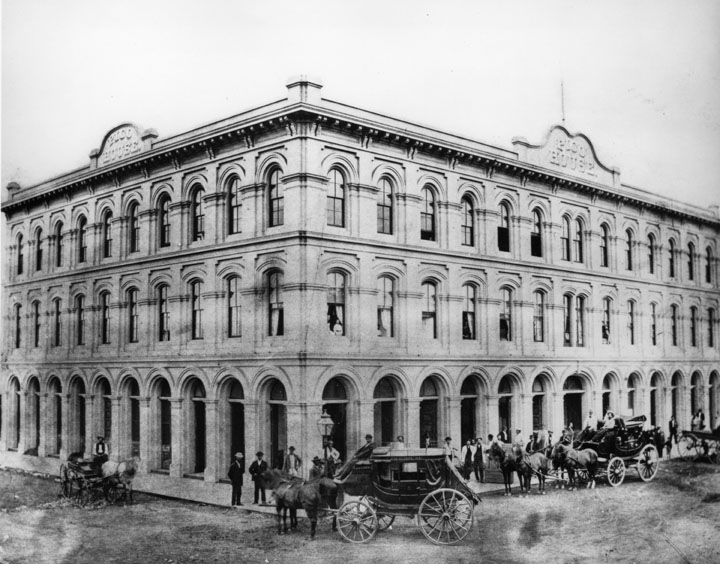
Pico House in 1875

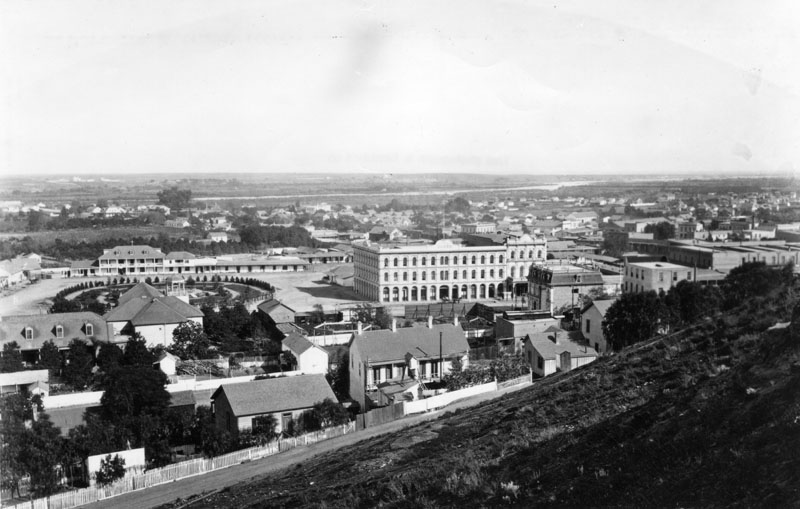
Pico House and the Plaza in 1876, photo taken from Fort Moore

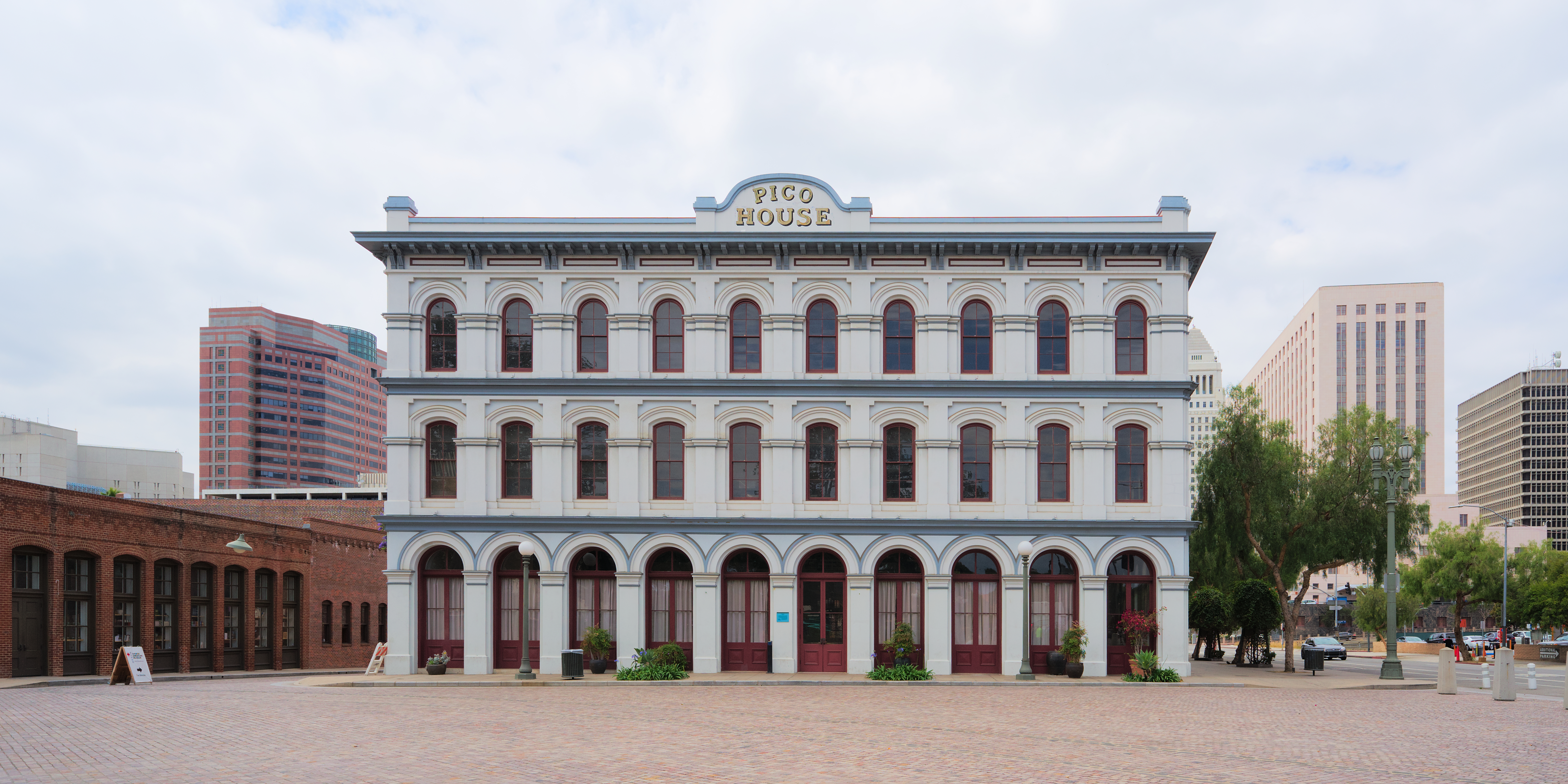
Pico House today

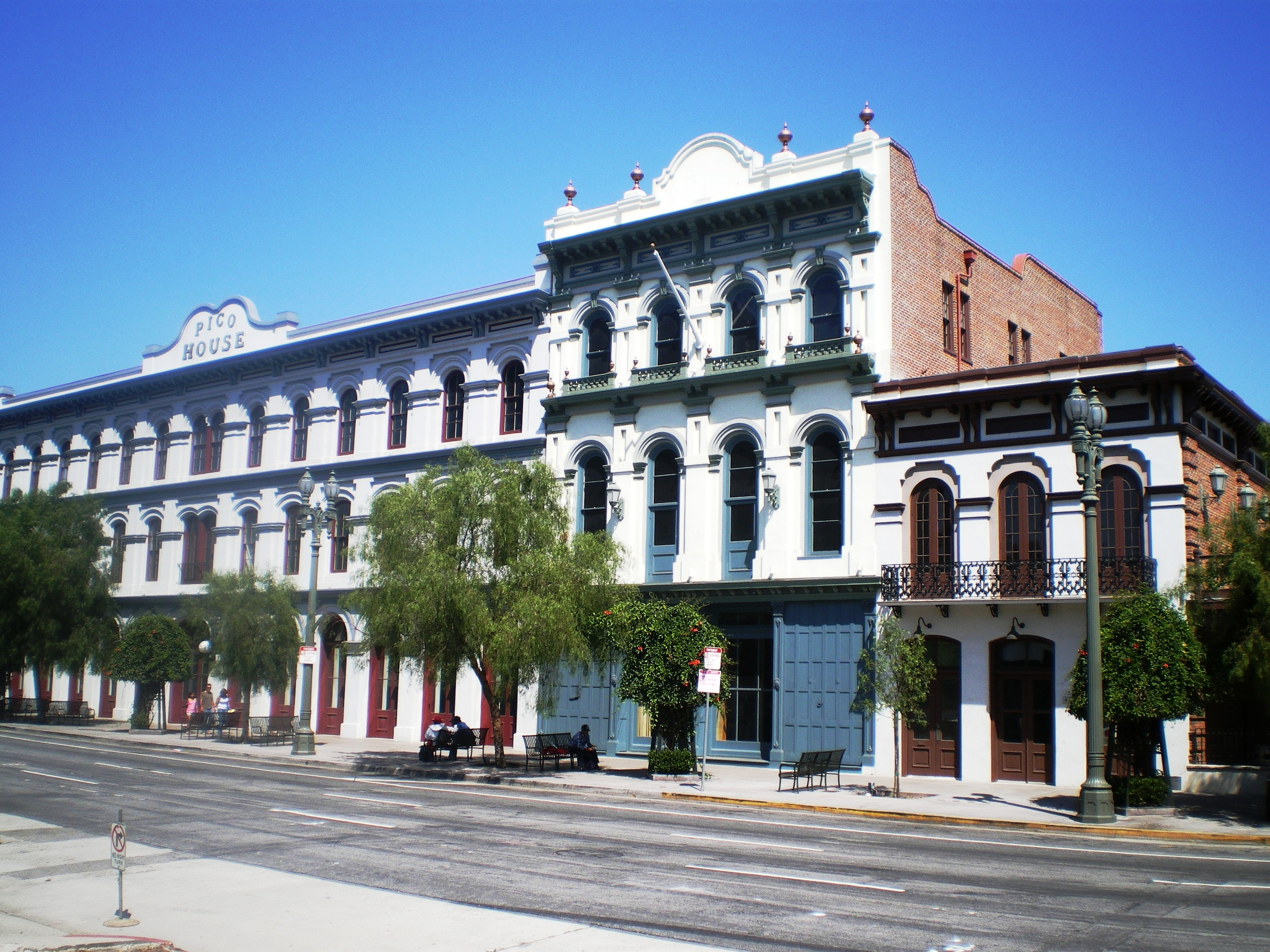
Pico House, Merced Theater and Masonic Hall

==== Pico House ====
Pico House was a luxury hotel built in 1870 by Pío Pico, a successful businessman who was the last Mexican Governor of Alta California. With indoor plumbing, gas-lit chandeliers, a grand double staircase, lace curtains, and a French restaurant, the Italianate three-story, 33-room hotel was the most elegant hotel in Southern California. It had a total of nearly eighty rooms. The Pico House is listed as a California Historical Landmark (No. 159).

==== Masonic Hall ====
Masonic Hall at 416 N. Main St., was built in 1858 as Lodge 42 of the Free and Accepted Masons. The building was a painted brick structure with a symbolic "Masonic eye" below the parapet. In 1868, the Masons moved to larger quarters further south. Afterward, the building was used for many purposes, including a pawn shop and boarding house. It is the oldest building in Los Angeles south of the Plaza.

==== Merced Theater ====
The Merced Theater, completed in 1870, was built in an Italianate style and operated as a live theatre from 1871 to 1876. When the Woods Opera House opened nearby in 1876, the Merced ceased being the city's leading theatre. Eventually, it gained an "unenviable reputation" because of "the disreputable dances staged there, and was finally closed by the authorities."

==== Plaza House ====
This two-story building at 507–511 N. Main St. houses part of the LA Plaza de Cultura y Artes, which includes the Vickrey -Brunswig Building next door. It is inscribed on its upper floor, and on 1890s maps it is marked, "Garnier Block" (not to be confused with the Garnier Block/Building on Los Angeles Street, one block away). Commissioned in 1883 by Philippe Garnier, once housed the "La Esperanza" bakery.

==== Vickrey-Brunswig Building ====
This five-story brick building facing the Plaza at 501 N. Main St. houses LA Plaza de Cultura y Artes, which also occupies the Plaza House next door. It was built in 1888 and combines Italianate and Victorian architecture; the architect was Robert Brown Young.

==== Site of Sentous Building ====
The Sentous Block or Sentous Building (19th c., demolished late 1950s) was located at 615-9 N Main St., with a back entrance on 616-620 North Spring St. (previously called Upper Main St., then San Fernando St.). Designed in 1886 by Burgess J. Reeve. Louis Sentous was a French pioneer in the early days of Los Angeles. The San Fernando Theatre was located here. The site is now part of the El Pueblo parking lot.

=== West side of Main from Republic south to Temple ===
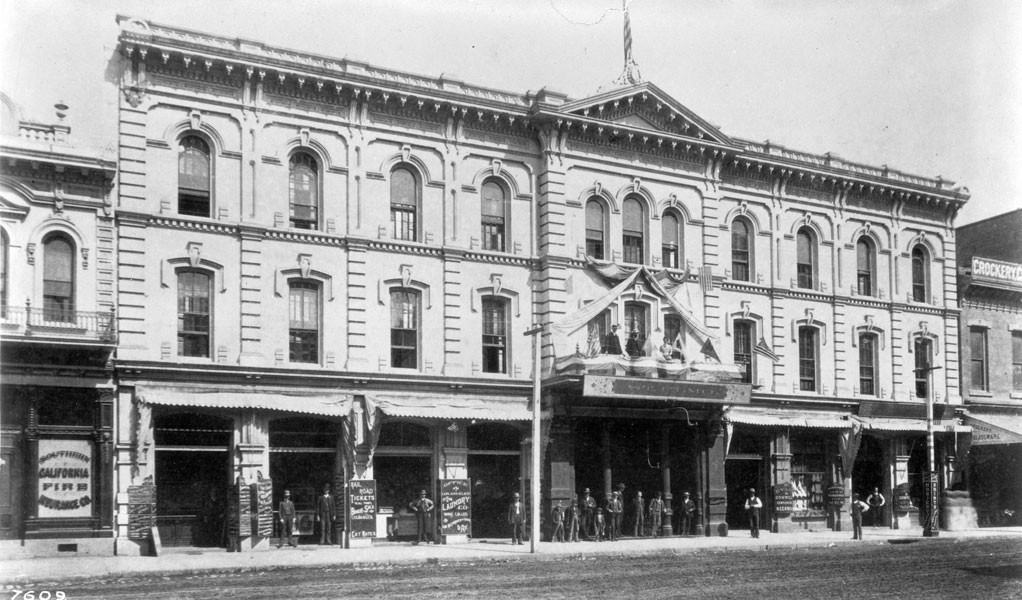
St. Elmo (orig. Lafayette) Hotel circa 1890

This block is part of the site of the current Spring Street Courthouse. Buildings previously located here include:

- Lafayette Hotel, 343 N. Main, opened in the 1850s, c. 1882 renamed the Cosmopolitan Hotel, then the St. Elmo Hotel. Razed in 1933.
- Farmers and Merchants Bank of Los Angeles location from 1874 through 1883, after leaving their original quarters in the Pico Building. Architect Ezra F. Kysor.

==== Northwest corner of Temple and Main ====
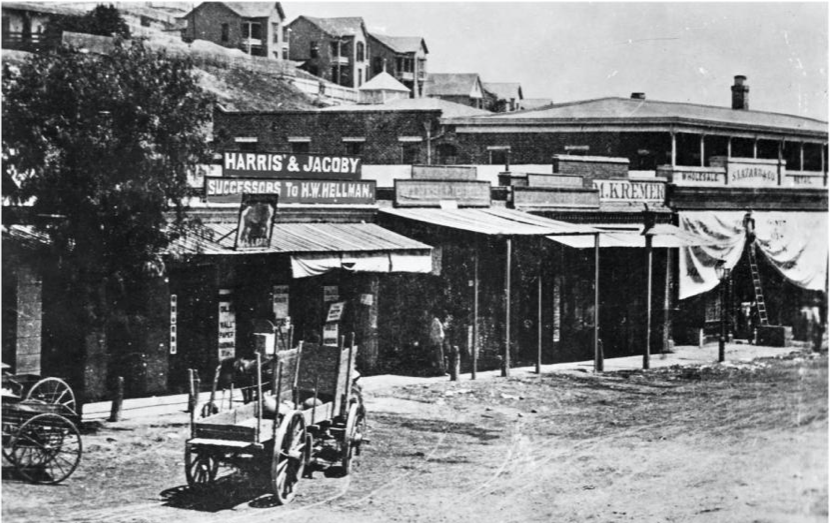
View to the NW of Old Downey Block, c. 1870, before Downey Block was built in 1871: "Harris & Jacoby", forerunners to Harris & Frank and Jacoby Bros., and M. Kremer, forerunner of the City of Paris, the city's first department store

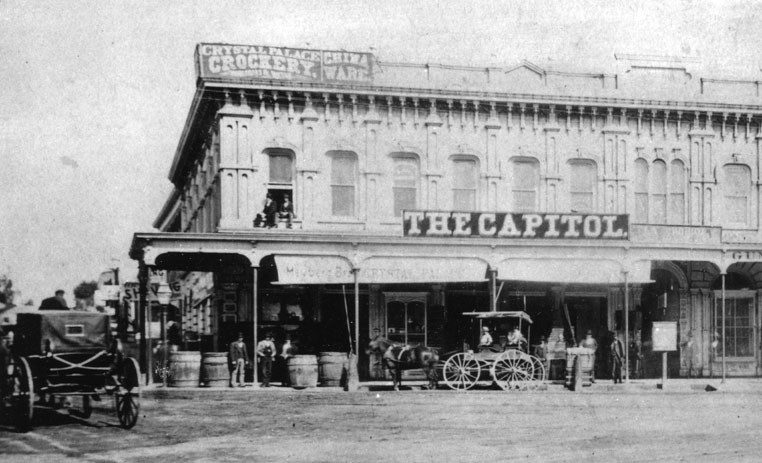
South end of the Downey Block, at the NW corner of Temple/Main, 1880s

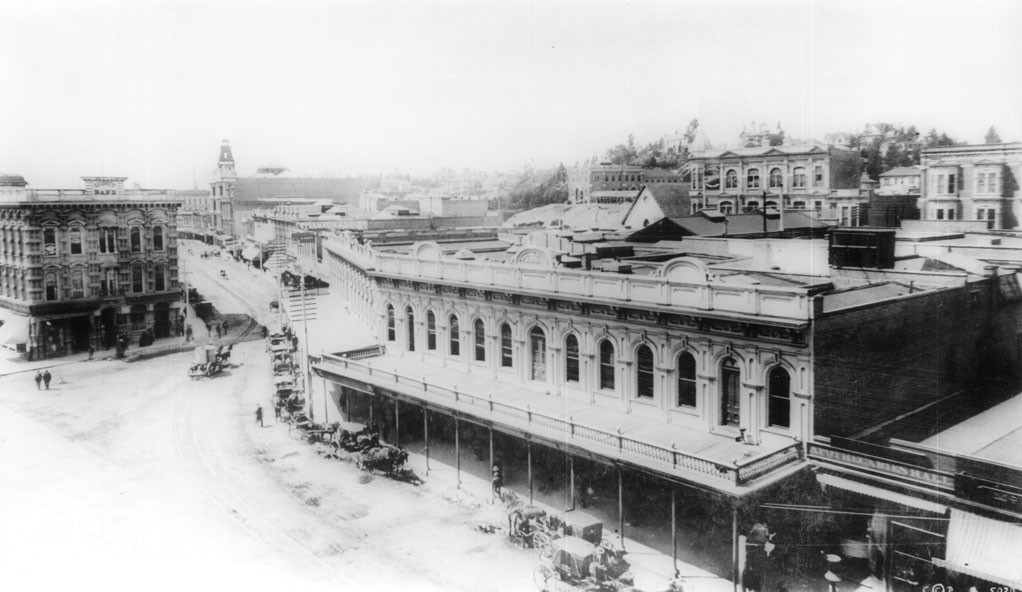
North end of the Downey Block along the west side of Main St., 1887. Temple Block at left; Spring Street runs towards the Phillips Block (tower) in the background at center-left.

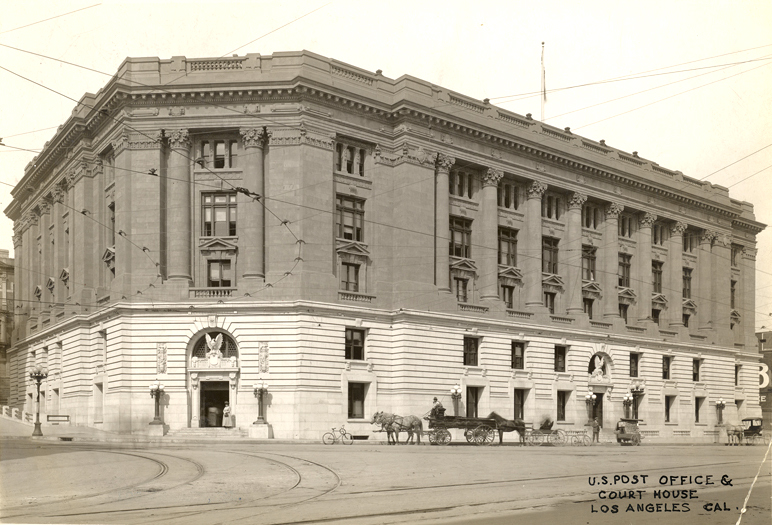
1910 Post Office and Courthouse which replaced the Downey Block NW corner Temple and Main

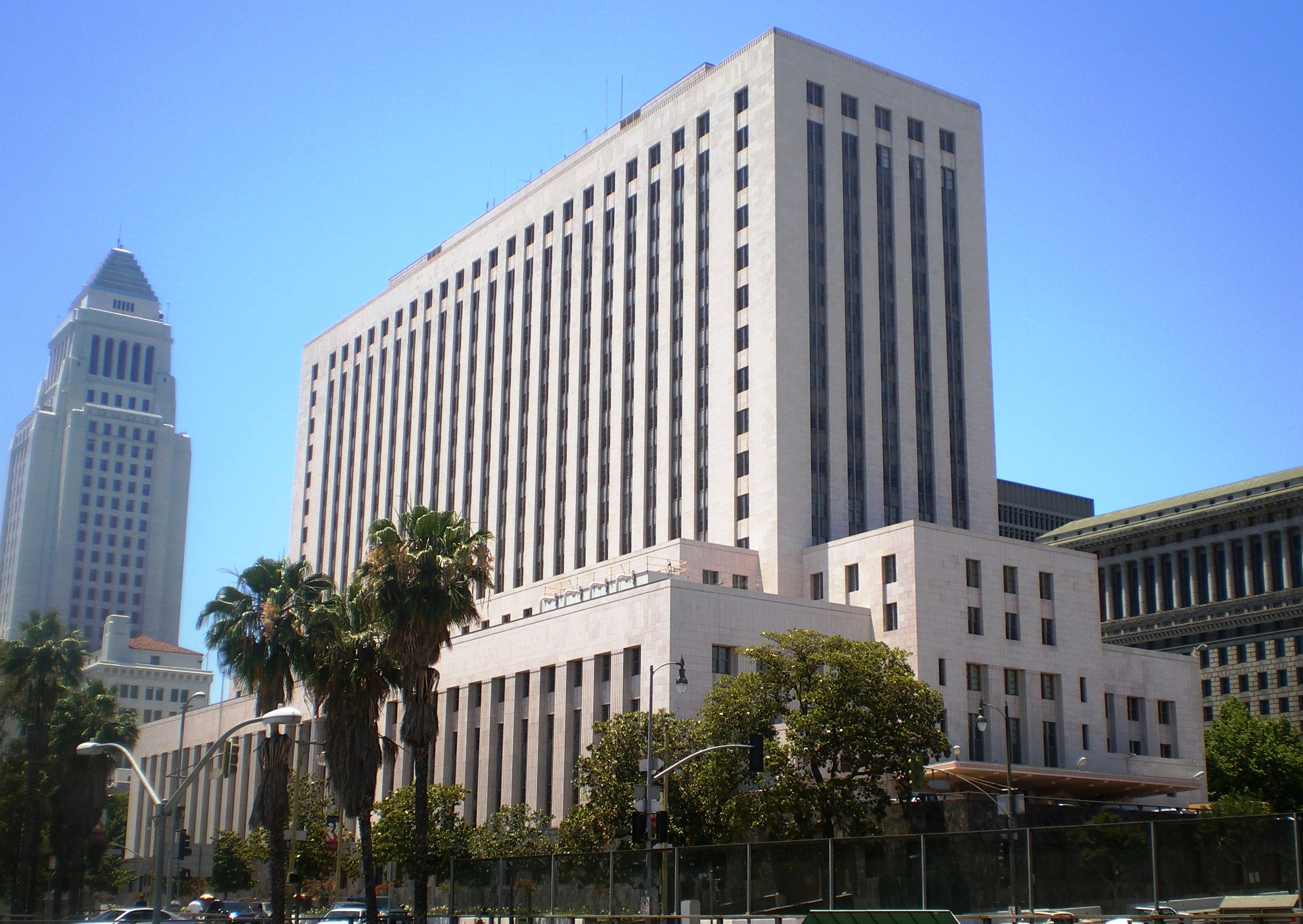
The 1940 Spring Street Courthouse, NW corner Temple/Main, 2008

On this corner stood four buildings in succession, the first two of which had a key role in the history of retail in Southern California, as it was home to a number of upscale retailers who would later grow to be big names in the city, and some, regional chains.

- Old Downey Block (?-1871), northwest corner of Temple and Main, Replaced by the Downey Block (1871-1910). Retailers that got their start here included Harris & Jacoby, forerunners to the Harris & Frank clothing chain and the large Jacoby Bros. department store; and M. Kremer, forerunner of the Los Angeles City of Paris.
- Downey Block (1871–1910), replaced by the New Post Office in 1910. Retailers who were located here included Coulter's (1878-9), Jacoby Bros. (1878-9), and Quincy Hall (1876–1882), forerunner of Harris & Frank.
- New Post Office also known as the Federal Building (1910–1937). Razed in 1937 and replaced by a new Federal Building now known as the Spring Street Courthouse, opened in 1940.
- Spring Street Courthouse, opened in 1940.

=== East side of Main from Arcadia south to Commercial ===
==== Baker Block ====
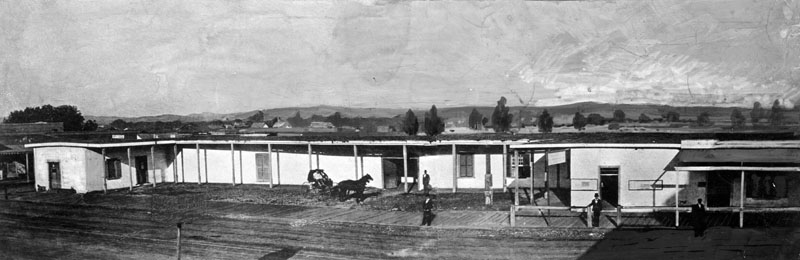
Abel Sterns adobe c. 1857. Built in 1835-1838, demolished in 1877 to make way for the Baker Block

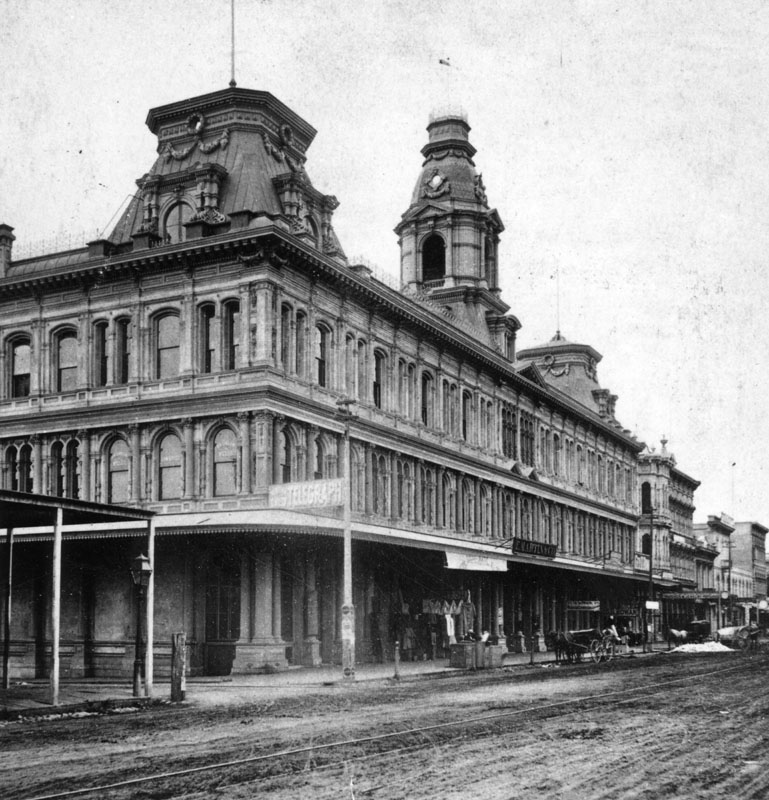
Baker Block, built 1878, demolished 1942, site now under US 101 freeway. Photo c. 1880

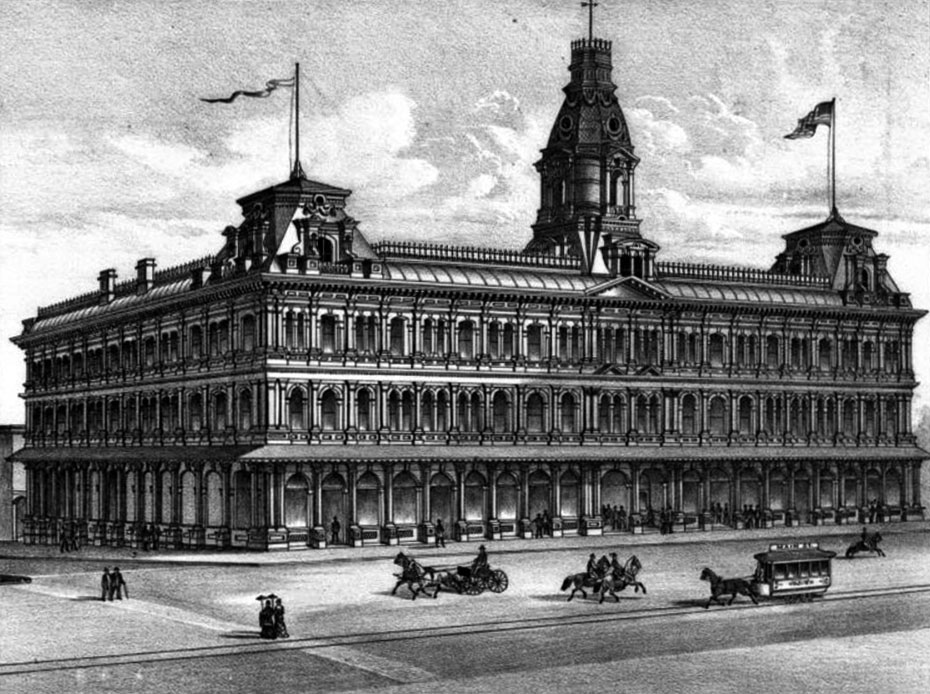
Lithograph of the Baker Block
- Baker Block, 334–348** N. Main at the southeast corner of Arcadia Street, opened late 1878, Second Empire architecture. The Baker Block was erected on the site of Don Abel Stearns' adobe mansion also called El Palacio, built in 1835-1838 and demolished in August and September of 1877; Col. Robert S. Baker who had the Baker Block built, had married Stearns' widow, Arcadia Bandini de Stearns Baker. When built, it was called the "finest emporium of commerce south of San Francisco". The ground floor housed retail tenants such as Coulter's (1879–1884), George D. Rowan and Eugene Germain. The second floor was offices, and the third floor held the city's most upscale apartments. In 1919, Goodwill Industries bought the building and opened its store and operations. That is not to say though, that nobody fought to save the building. The Metropolitan Garden Association tried to move the Baker Block to another location for use as a public recreation center, while city councilman Arthur E. Briggs raised funds to convert the building into a city history museum. Nonetheless, in 1941, Goodwill sold the building to the city, which demolished it in 1942. Currently, the US 101 freeway, and the new, more southerly route of Arcadia Street, run over most of the site.

==== South of Baker Block ====
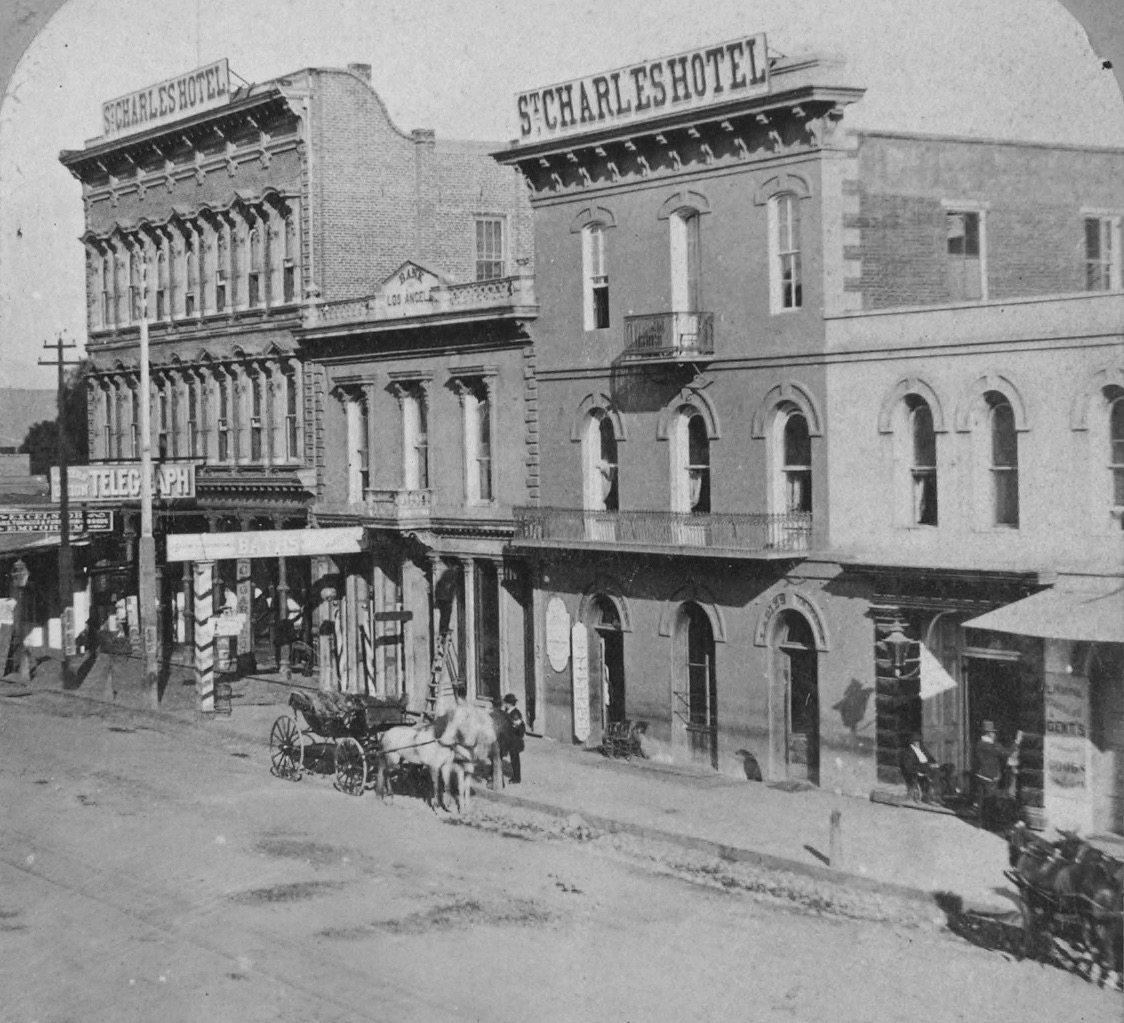
c. late 1870s: Grand Central Hotel branded as part of the St. Charles, Bank of Los Angeles in the Pico Bldg., St. Charles hotel proper, 312 bldg. and L. Harris store, forerunner of Harris & Frank

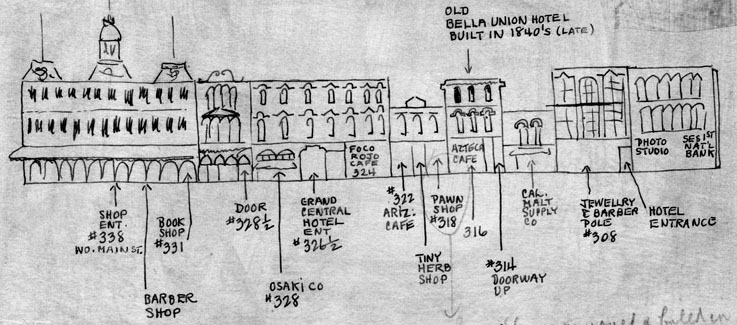
Sketch of east side of the 300 block of North Main Street, between Arcadia and Commercial streets, as it appeared circa 1880

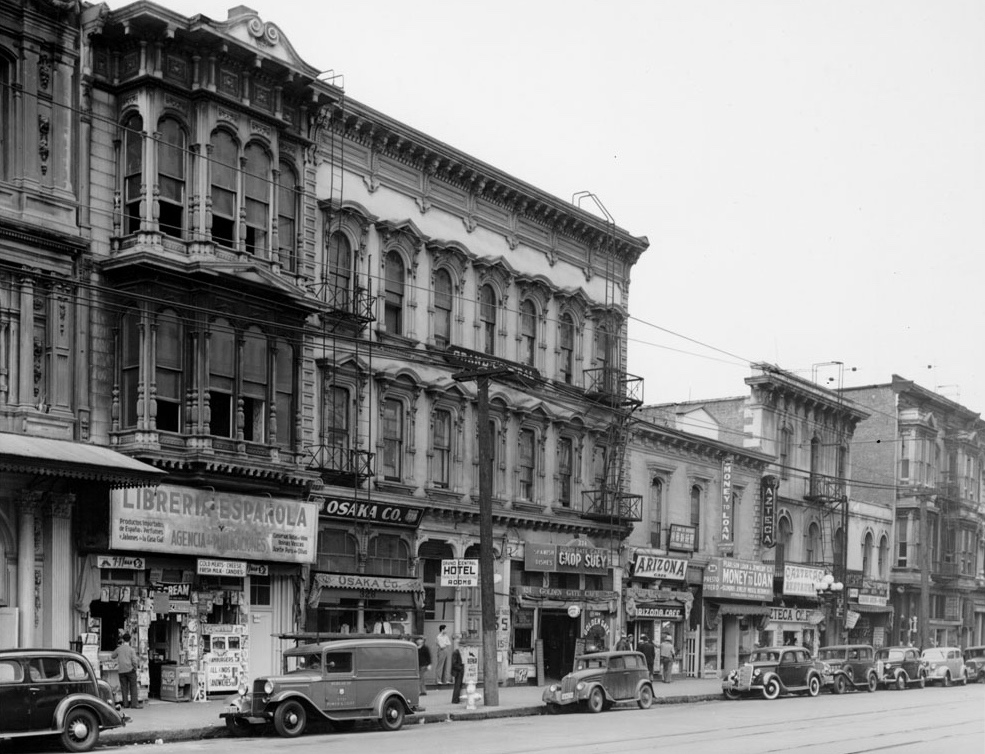
Downey ("Libería Española"), Grand Central ("Osaka Co.", "Chop Suey"), Pico ("Arizona Cafe", "Money to Loan"), Bella Union/St Charles ("Azteca"), 312 and 306-8 buildings, 1930s.

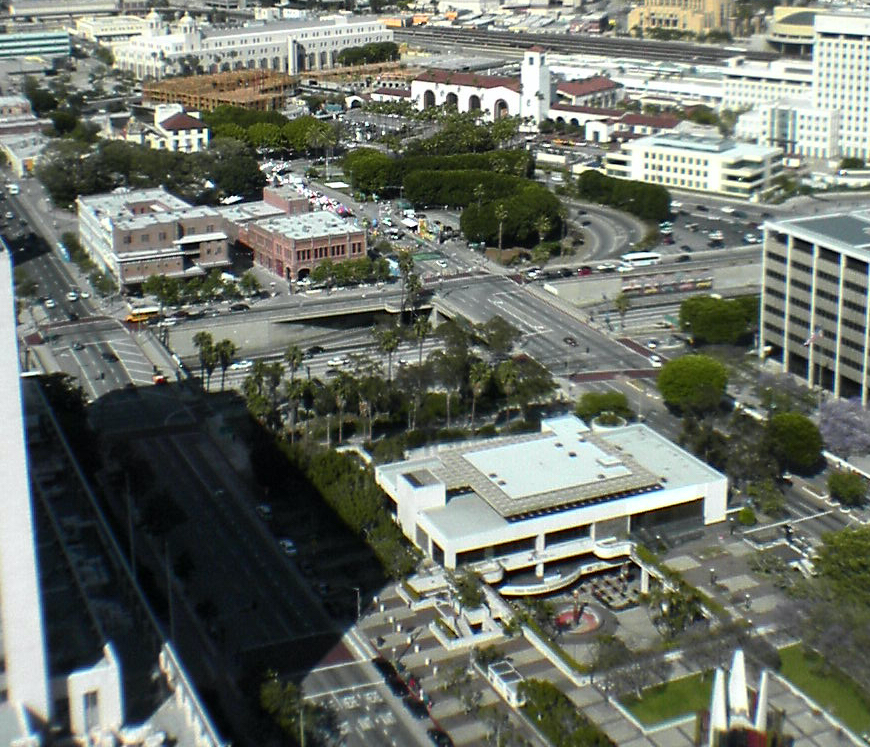
2005 view. Main St. runs along the left (west) side from the Plaza area (top left), over US 101 (site of the Baker Block) and along the western edge of the Los Angeles Mall (bottom center), site of the buildings described below (Downey Building through Ducommun Block).

South of the Baker Block stood buildings that are now the site of the northwestern-most part of the Los Angeles Mall:

- Downey Building (not to be confused with the "Downey Block"), 324–330** N. Main, opened 1878, three stories, captured in a 1957 color photo standing alone as the last building on the block, demolished that year. In the 1930s photo above, it is home to the Librería Española.
- Grand Central Hotel, opened 1876, demolished.
- Pico Building, 318-322** N. Main, opened 1867, the city’s first bank building, to house the new Hellman, Temple & Co. bank, then in 1871 the first location of Hellman’s own bank Farmers and Merchants Bank of Los Angeles, forerunner of Security Pacific National Bank. Later tenants included the Los Angeles County Bank (1874-1878), Charles H. Bush, jeweler and watchmaker (1878-1905), Louis E. Pearlson’s jewelry, loan and pawnshop (from 1905), as well as several barber shops and then a succession of owner-operated restaurants. The last occupants were a jewelers and the Mexican restaurant Arizona Cafe #2. Demolished 1957 to make way for a parking lot.
- Bella Union Hotel, later the St. Charles Hotel, 314–316** N. Main. Opened 1835, demolished 1940. Home to the Azteca Cafe in the 1930s.
- 312 N. Main, two stories, home to a saloon in the mid-1890s
- 306–308 N. Main, three stories, home to offices (at #308) and Bright's Cheap Store (#306) in 1882.

- Ducommun Block or Ducommun Building, 300-2-4** N. Main (200-2-4* N. Main). In the 1880s, home to the Ducommun hardware store, a furniture store and Prager Dry Goods. In the early 20th century, site of the Security Pacific National Bank. Home to the Federal Theatre from c. 1913–1917.

The Los Angeles Mall replaced these blocks; it is a small shopping center at the Los Angeles Civic Center, between Main and Los Angeles Streets on the north and south sides of Temple Street, connected by both a pedestrian bridge and a tunnel. It features Joseph Young's sculpture Triforium, with 1,500 blown-glass prisms synchronized to an electronic glass bell carillon. The mall opened in 1974 and includes a four-level parking garage with 2,400 spaces.

=== East side of Main from Commercial south to First ===
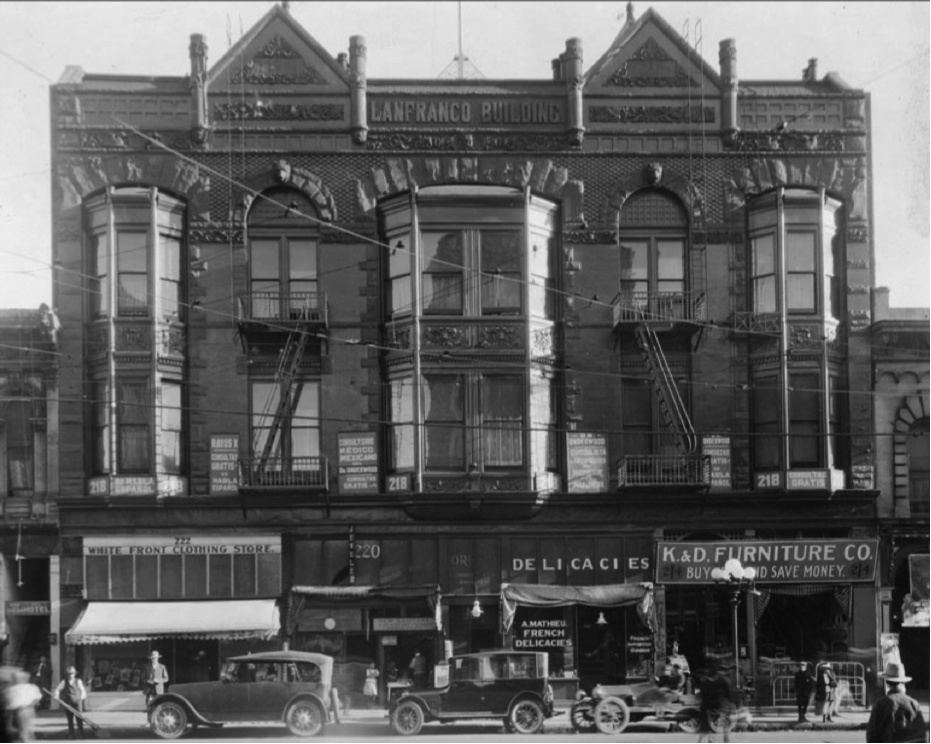
The 1888 New Lanfranco Block, early 1920s

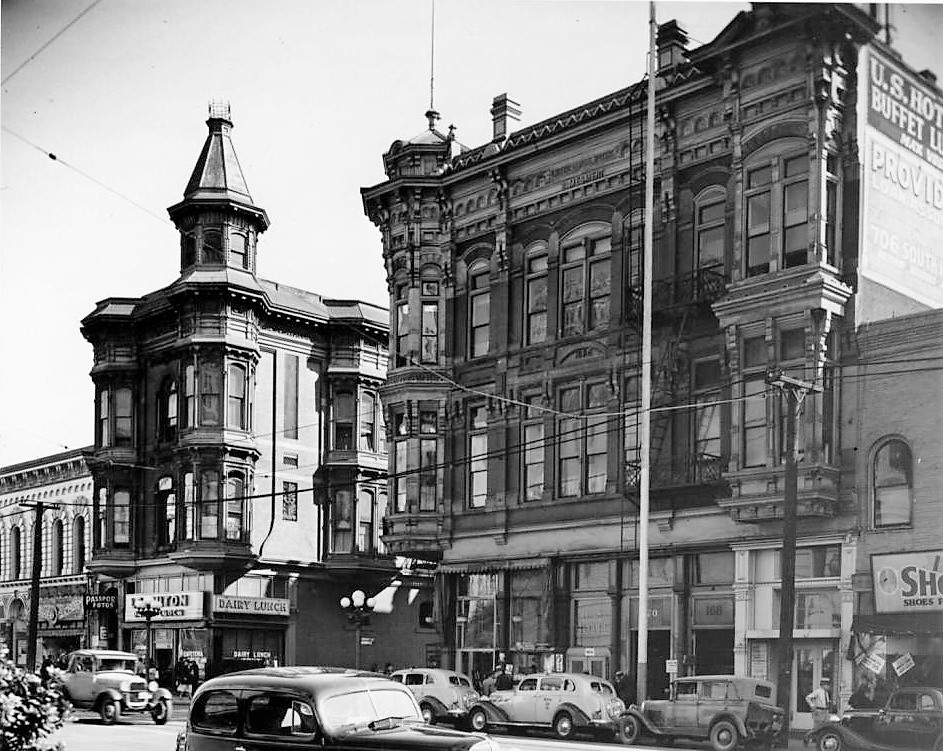
Main and Requena: United States Hotel right, Victorian 200–202 N. Main at left (Southern Pacific ticket office in 1888)

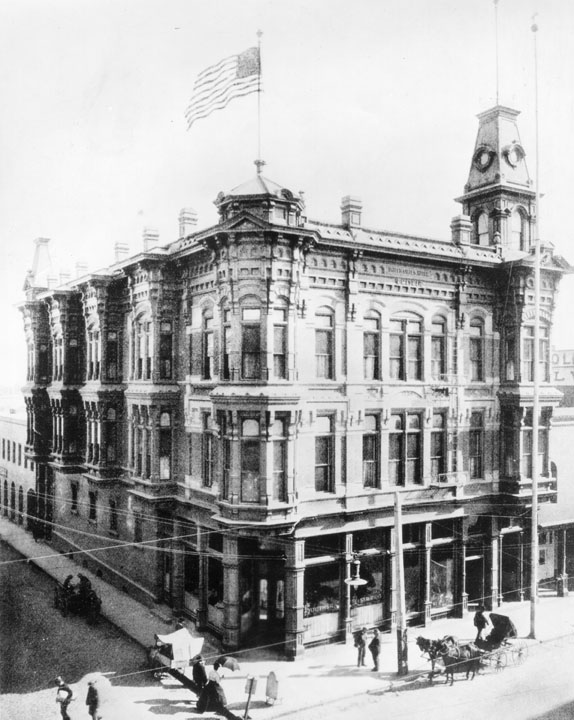
United States Hotel, SE corner Requena/Main. c. 1880

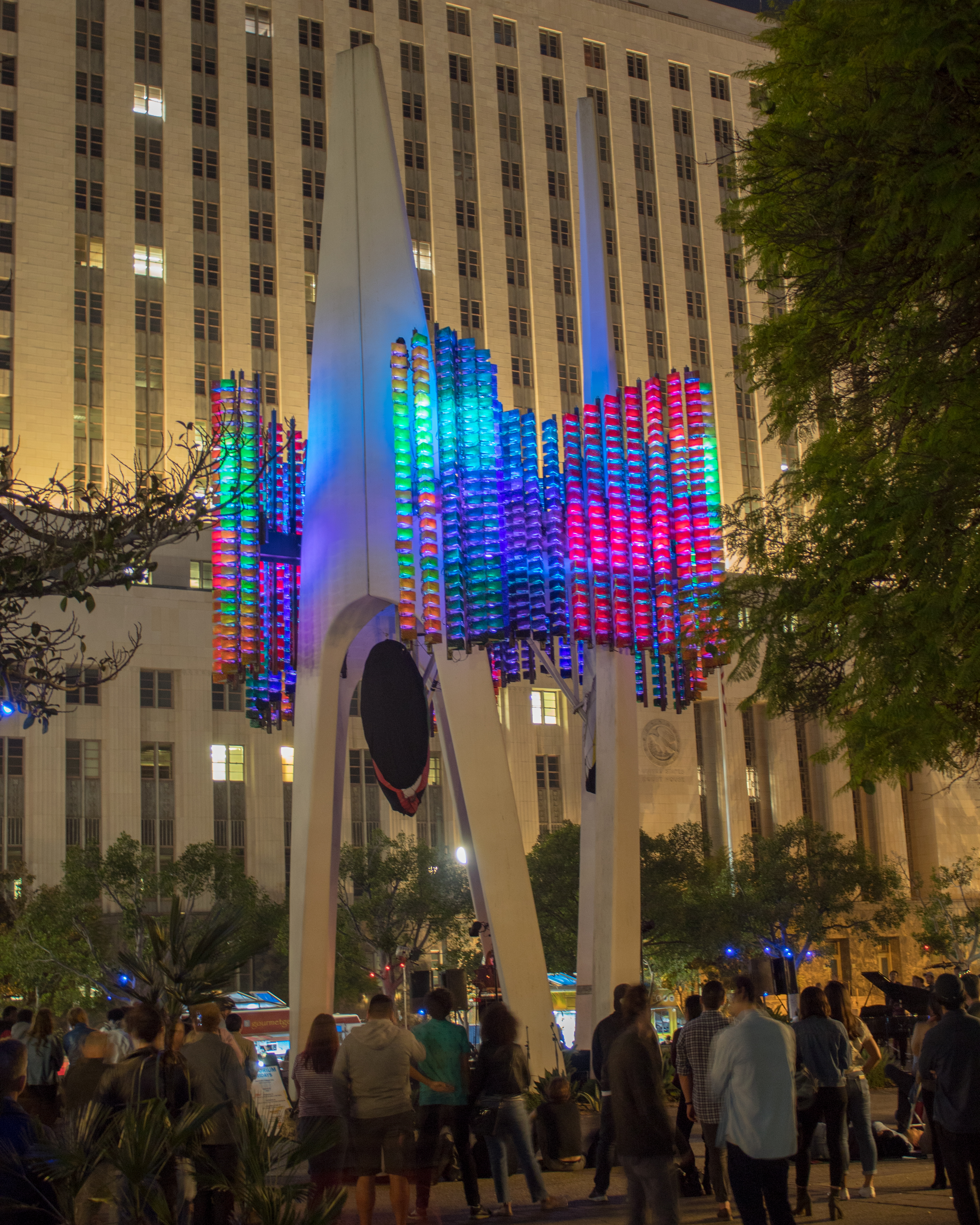
Triforium sculpture at the Los Angeles Mall just N of the NE corner of 1st/Temple, 2018.

Currently, this site is the southernmost end of the Los Angeles Mall; Triforium is approximately on the site of Commercial Street.

- #240 Farmers and Merchants Bank was located here in 1896
- #236 Los Angeles Savings Bank was located here in 1896
- #226-8 Commercial Bank, renamed First National Bank in 1880, was located here in 1896.First National Bank was located here in 1896.
- #214–222 (pre-1890 numbering: 74): New Lanfranco Block, built 1888, architects Curlett, Eisen & Cuthbertson Site of the Old Lanfranco Block, demolished in 1888.
- #200–202 (NE corner of Requena) Southern Pacific ticket office as of 1888-9
- #158–172: United States Hotel, southeast corner of Main and Requena St. (a.k.a. Market St.). Built 1861-2, demolished 1939. When built it was one of three hotels in the city, alongside the Bella Union and the Lafayette Hotel. It was ornate and Italianate in style, with a "profusion of brackets, corbel tables and oriel windows. On one end, a tower with a mansard roof lit by l'oeil de boeuf windows, poked up another story to signal the hotel's location to travelers.” Today, location of the south plaza of the Los Angeles Mall.

=== West side of Main from Temple south to First ===
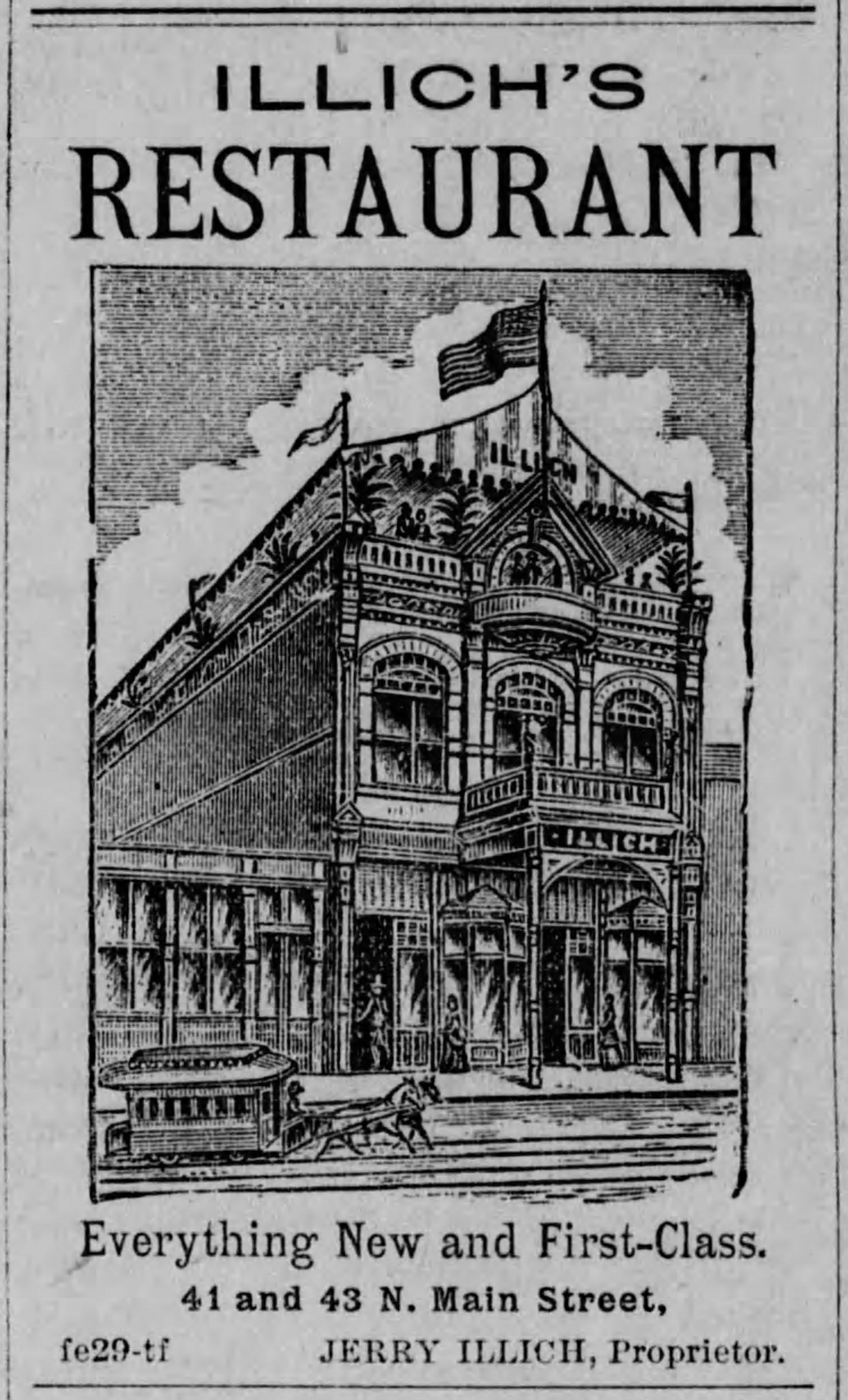
Illich's Restaurant ad from March 1890

This block is, since 1928, the site of Los Angeles City Hall

- Before 1926, Spring Street and Main Street met at Temple Street. From Temple, Main and Spring streets proceeded south; Spring at a more southwesterly angle. This created a narrow triangle with the triangle's northern point at Temple. Proceeding south along Main on the right-hand side one would pass the east side of Temple Block.
- Junction with Market Street
- Clock Tower Courthouse until demolished in 1895, or the Bullard Block built in its place after 1895.
- Junction with Court Street
- Illich's Restaurant and Oyster Parlors, 41–43 (pre-1890 numbering) 145–7 (post-1890) N. Main St.. Starting in the 1870s as a small chophouse, Illich's grew to be the largest restaurant in the city. Owner Jerry Illich was born in Dalmatia. He was connected with the Maison Doree restaurant at 4th and Main and later opened his own restaurant in 1896 on west 2nd Street between Broadway and Hill.
- Northwest corner of First and Main streets.

=== East side of Main from First to Second ===
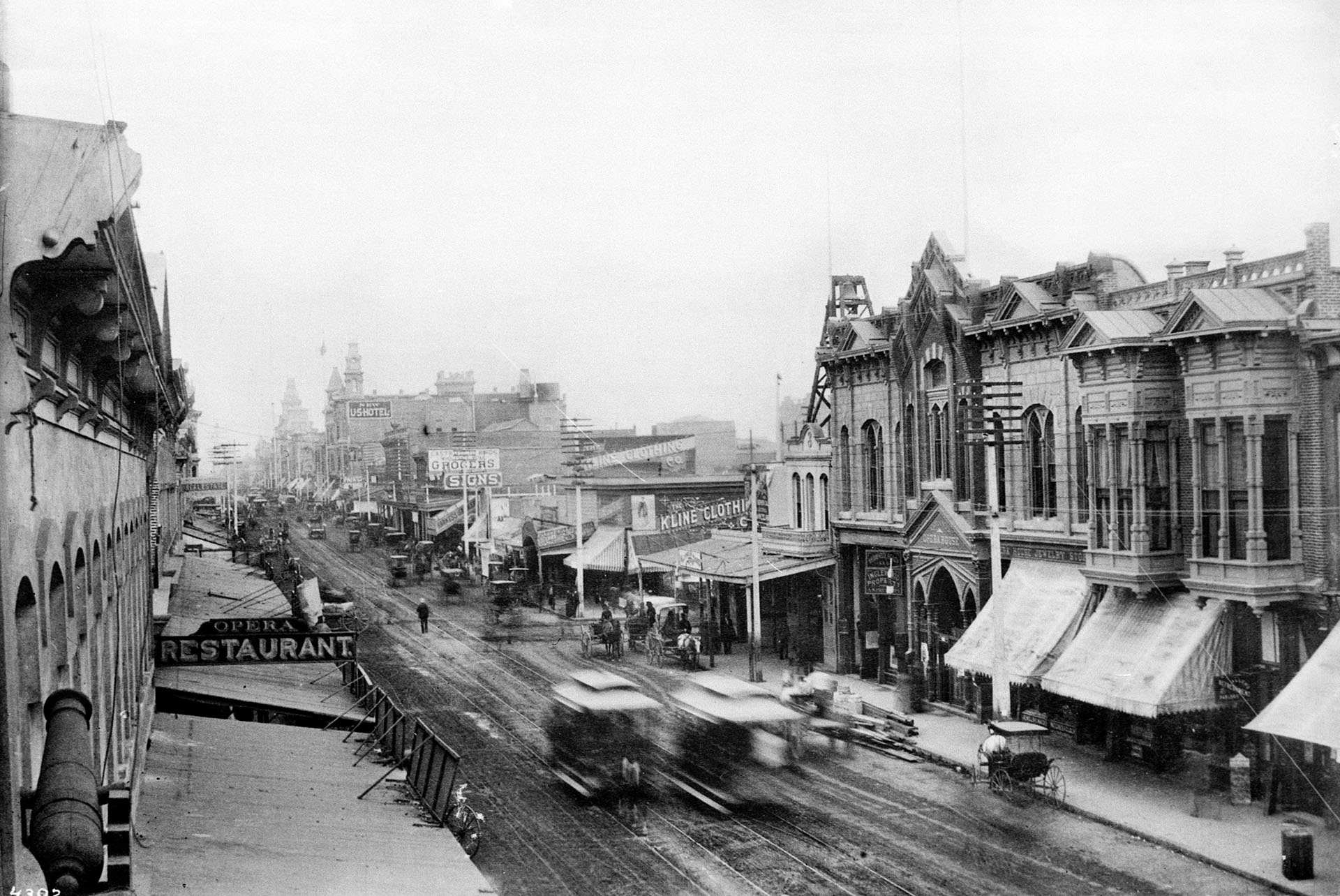
Two horsecars pass in a blur c. 1889. Looking north along Main from just south of 1st Street. Grand Opera House at right. Towers of the United States Hotel at back, behind which the towers of the Baker Block.

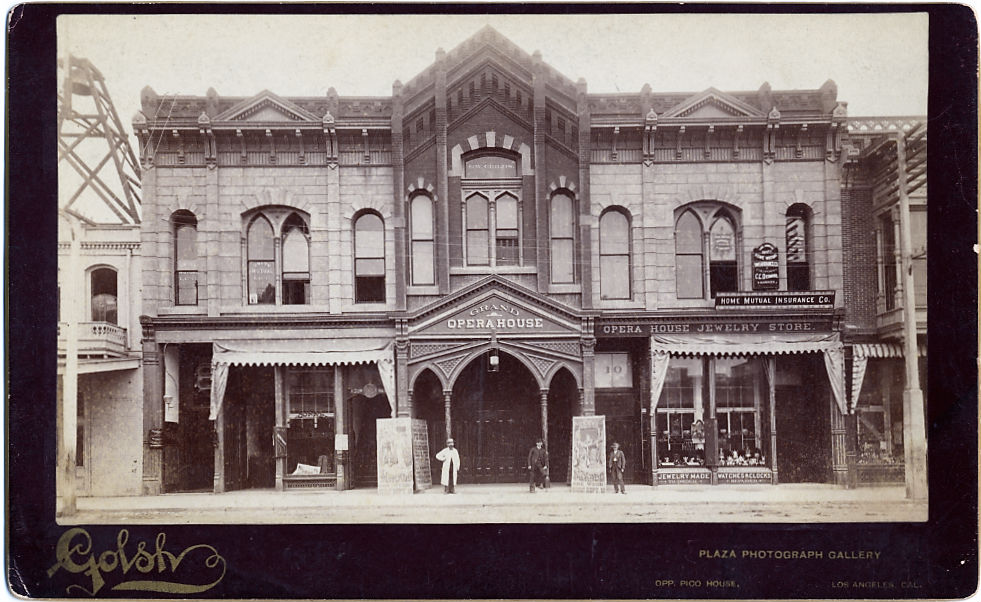
Grand Opera House, 110 S. Main, c. 1884–1893

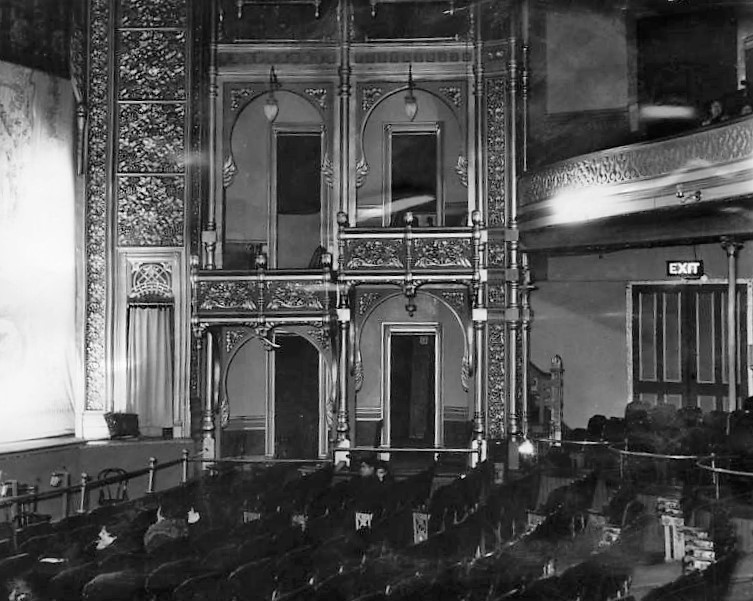
Orpheum Theatre when located at the Grand Opera House building, c. 1898

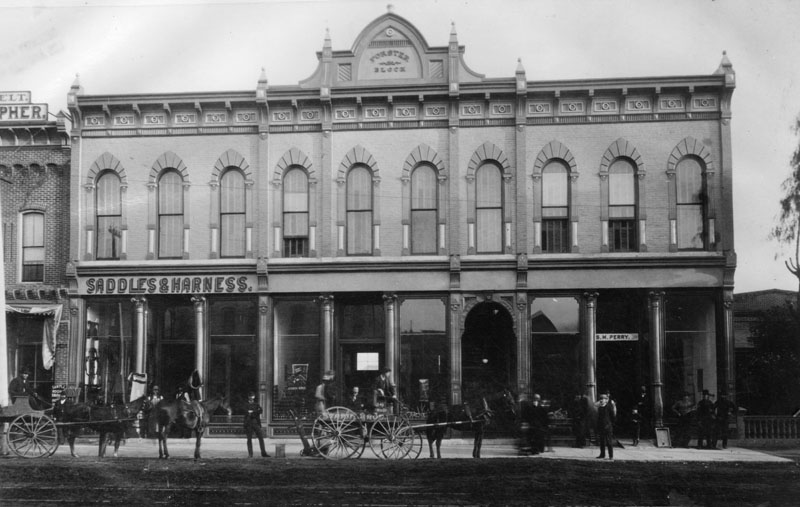
Forster Block
- Grand Opera House (1884, demolished 1936, capacity 1311, 110 S. Main, in later years known as the Orpheum (Dec. 1894–Sep. 1903), Clune's Grand (c. 1912), The Grand (c. 1920s), and Teatro México (1930s). (The Orpheum Circuit (circuit meaning "chain") moved the Orpheum name to a different venue in 1903 at 227 S. Spring, and again in 1911 to what is now the Palace Theatre). This theater was the site of the first commercial showing of motion pictures in the city. Demolished in 1936 to make way for a parking lot.
- Forster Block, 122–128 S. Main St. (post-1890 numbering), 22–28 S. Main St. (per-1890 numbering), was a two-story building built in the early 1880s, five doors south of the Grand Opera House. It housed a coffee house of the Women's Christian Temperance Union at #26, heavily damaged in an 1885 fire, and a saddlery.

=== Third from Spring to Main, Third and Main ===
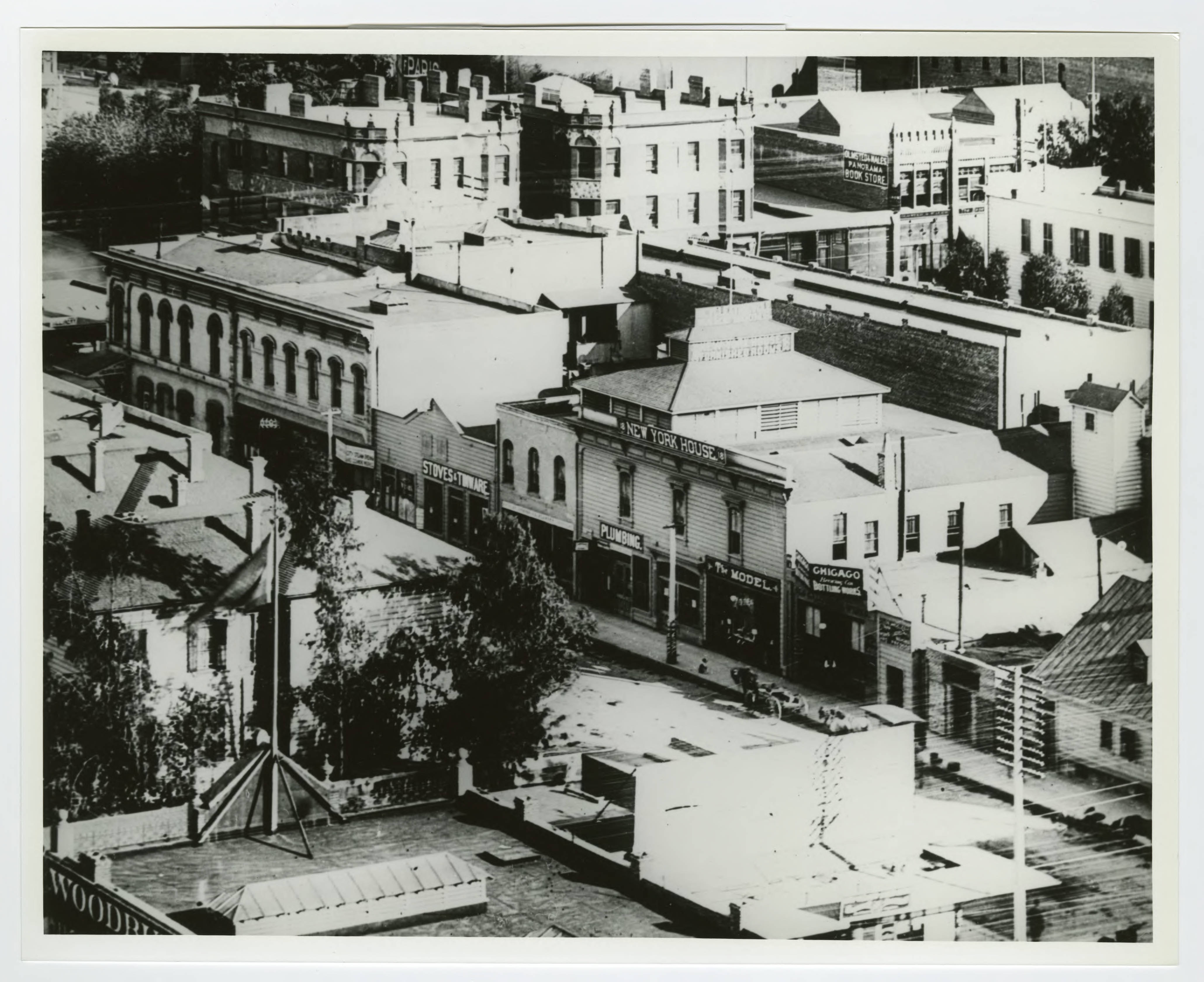
c. 1887 view looking east along south side of 3rd Street incl. former New York Brewery, towards Main (across top). Back left: The Thom Block. Back right: Olmsted & Wales bookstore in the Panorama Building.

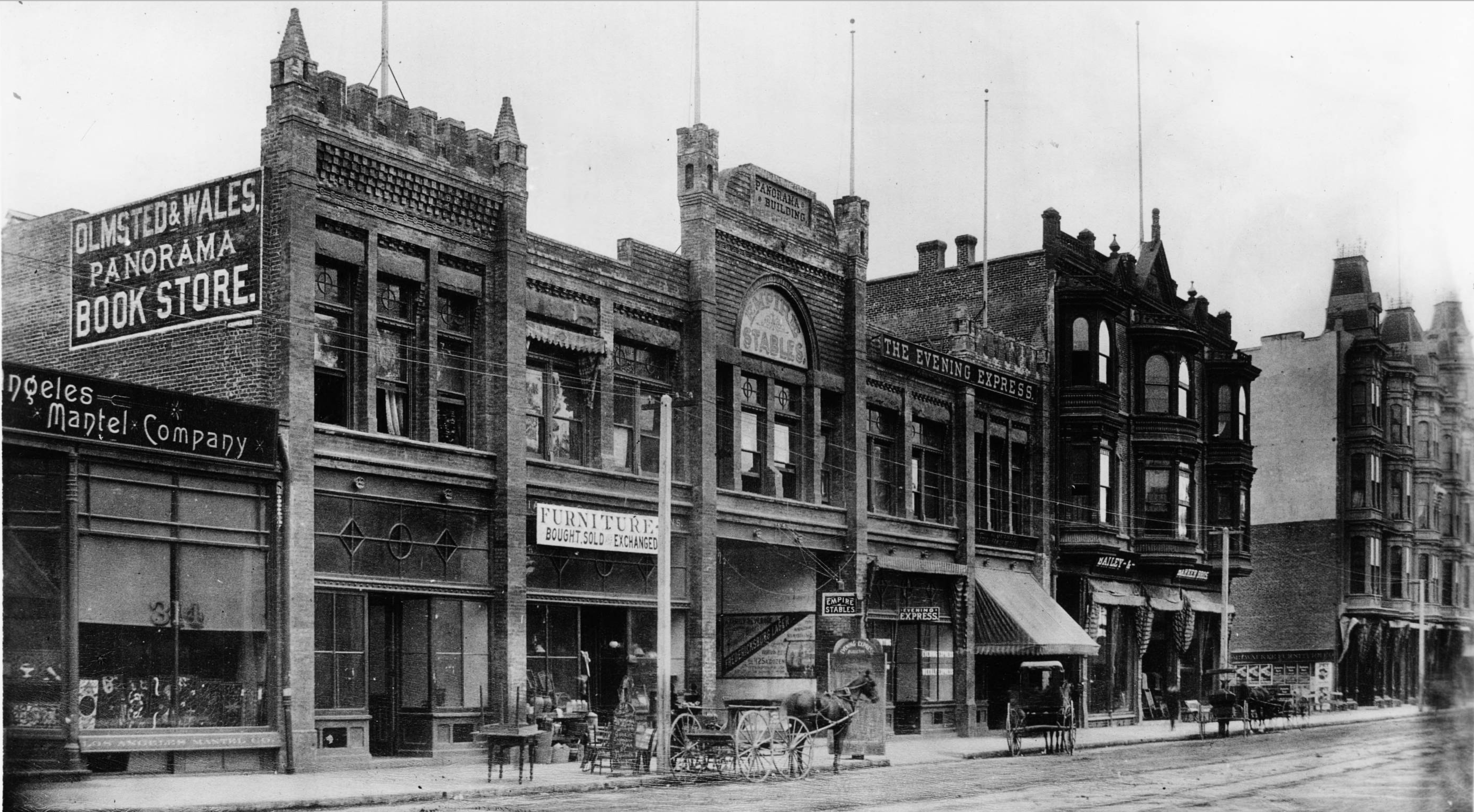
Panorama Building, E side of Main between Mayo (3rd) and 4th, c. 1890. The center entrance led through to the panorama exhibition space in the back. Note the Olmsted & Wales Panorama Bookstore, and the offices of the Evening Express. At right, the Hotel Westminster at the NE corner of 4th/Main.

On the corner of Third and Main:

- Wells Fargo and Co. offices, northwest corner of 3rd/Main as of 1894
- The Thom Block, southeast corner of Mayo/Third and Main as of 1894
- Schwartz Block and Jackson House, southwest corner of 3rd/Main as of 1894

=== Buildings along Los Angeles Street ===
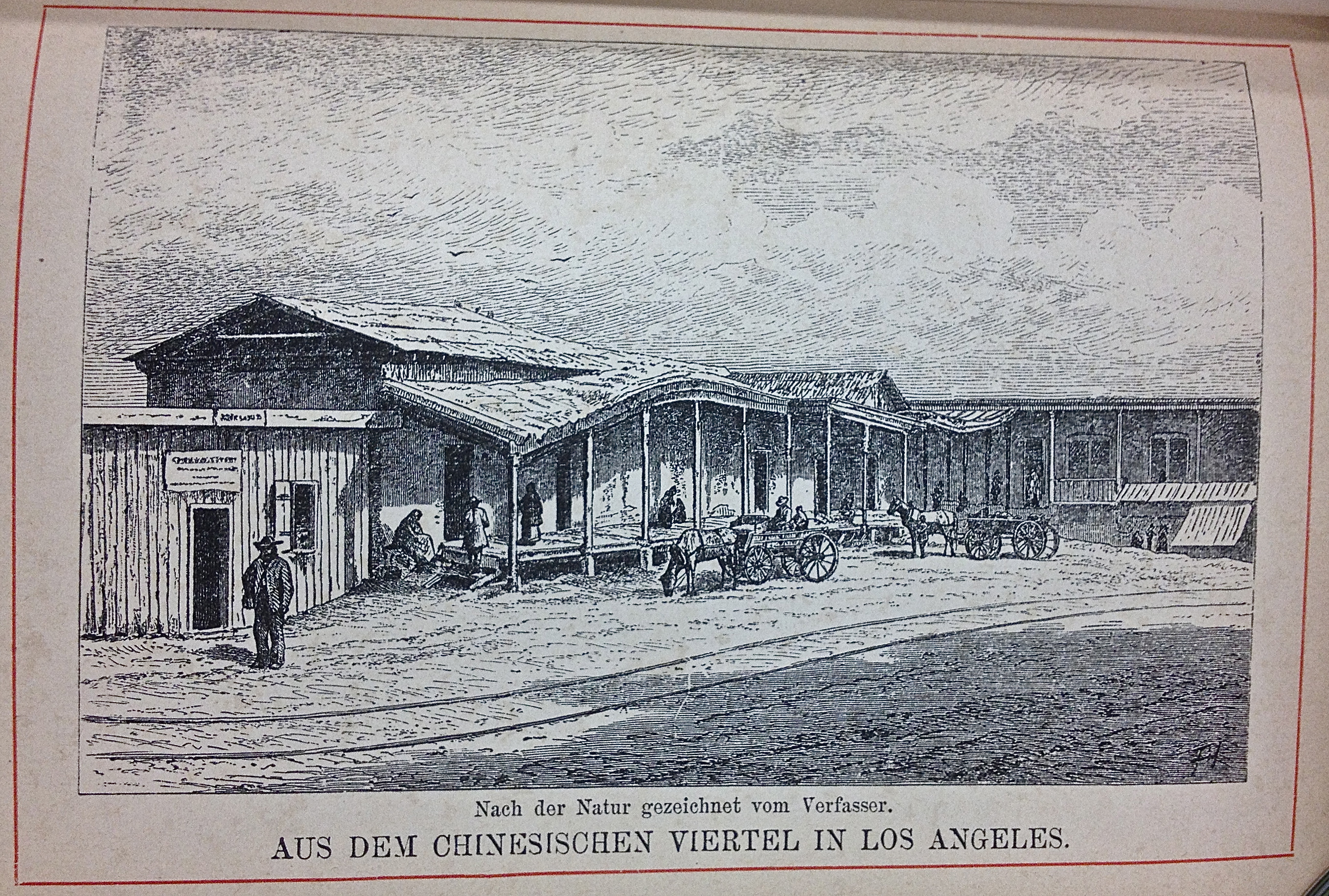
Old Chinatown stretched from Sanchez Street across Los Angeles Street to what is now Union Station. c.1885.

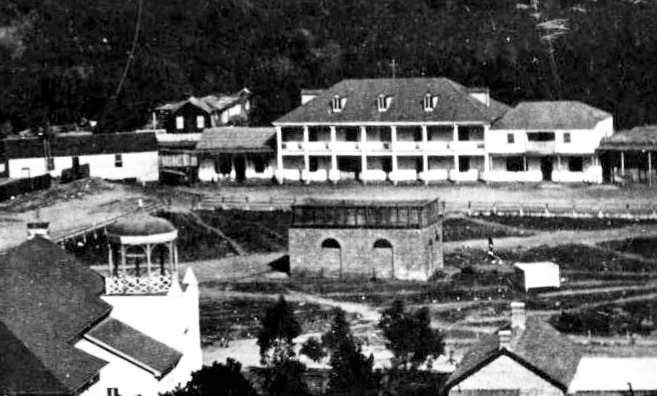
Lugo Adobe lining the eastern edge of Los Angeles Plaza. The street in front of the adobe was part of Los Angeles St. starting in the 1880s.

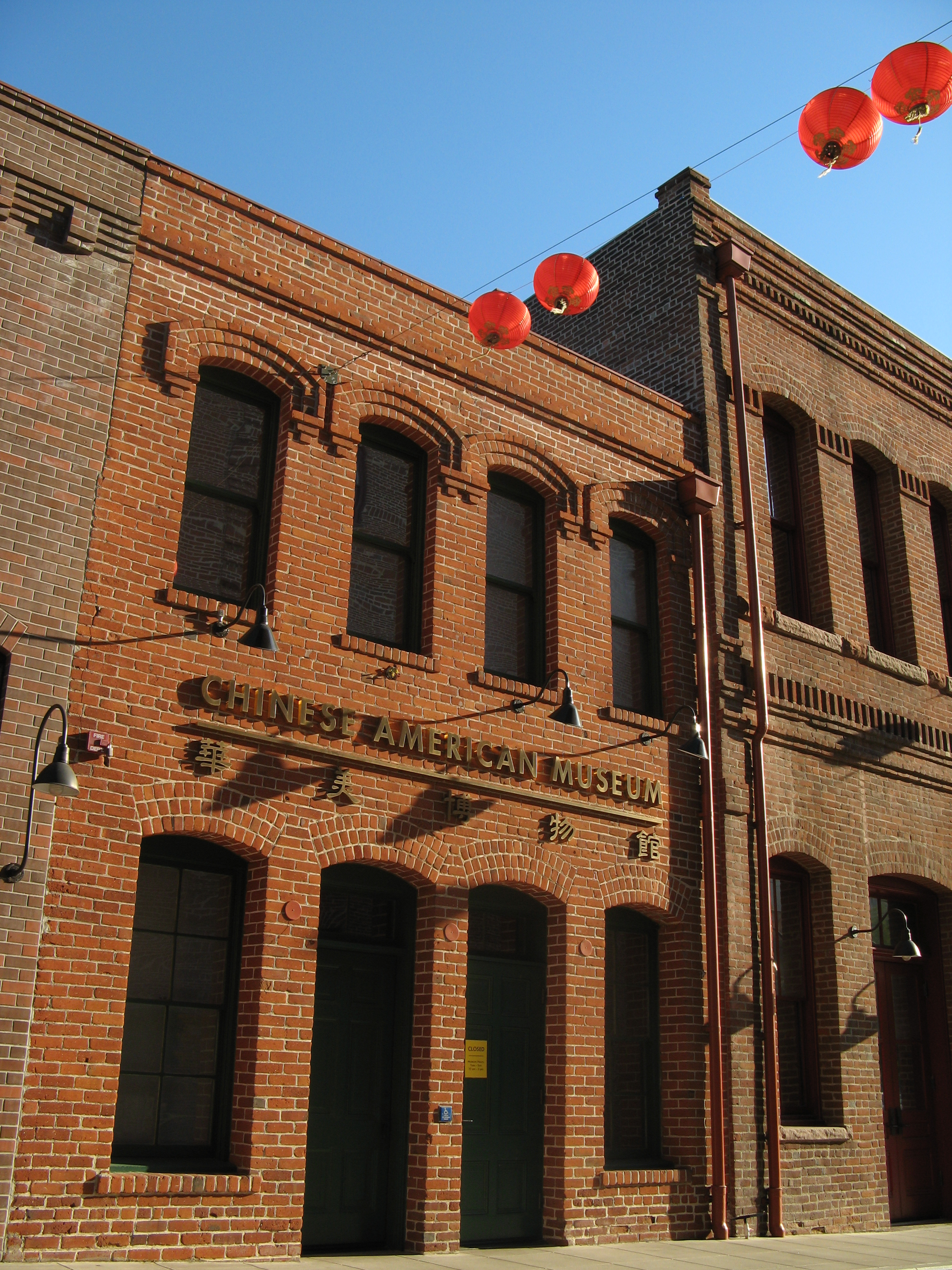
Chinese American Museum in the Garnier Building

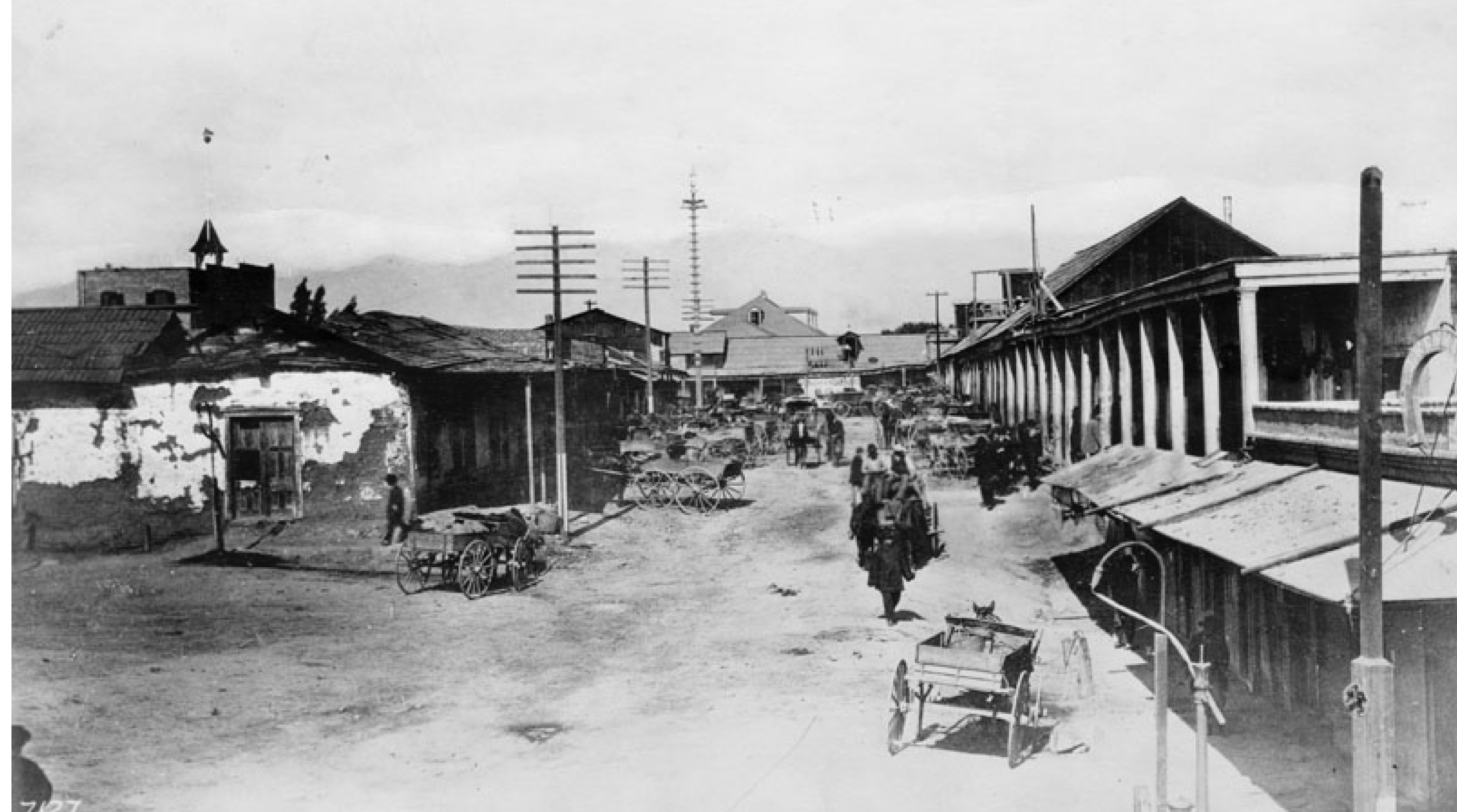
1882 view, looking north from Broad Place along Calle de los Negros to the Ignacio Del Valle adobe in the far background. At left, with the peeling paint, is the Coronel Adobe (SE corner of Arcadia). A few years later, both adobes would be demolished and Los Angeles St. would be extended northward to (and past) the Plaza.

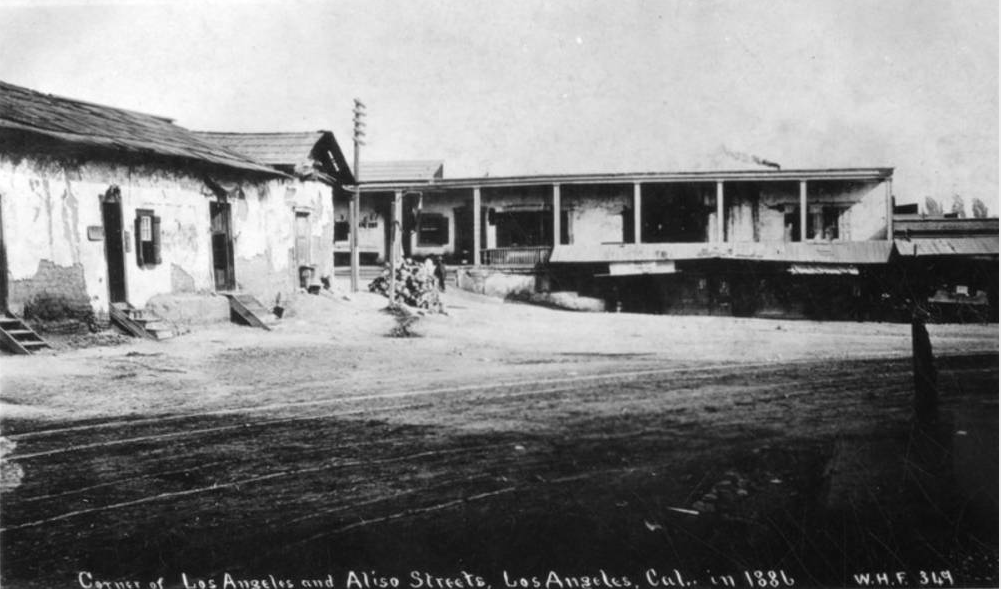
Looking east on Arcadia towards houses lining the east side of Broad Place. Aliso Street runs form their right side towards the background. Calle de los Negros runs to the left in front of them. The Coronel Adobe is at left.

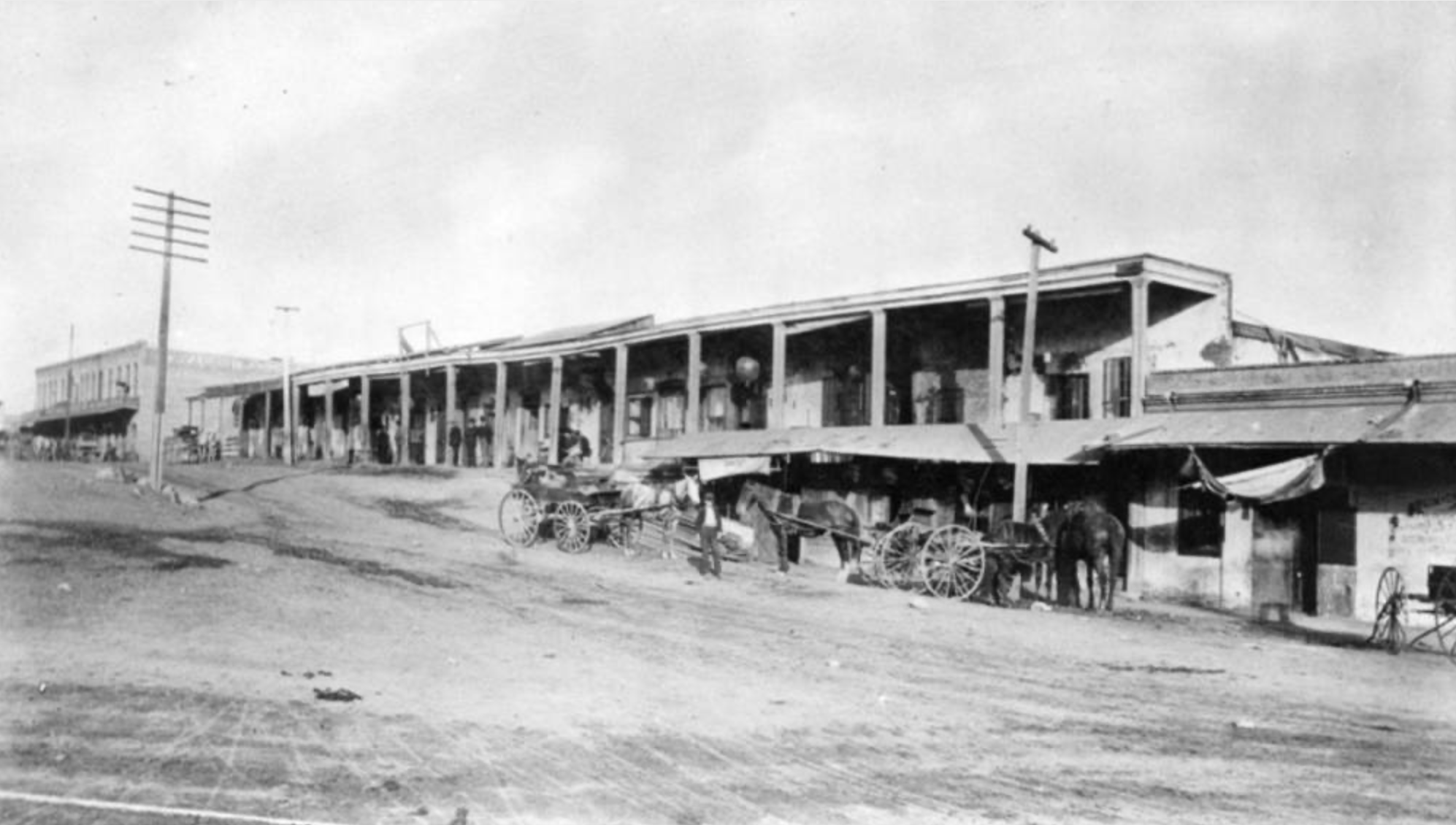
Adobes in Calle de los Negros

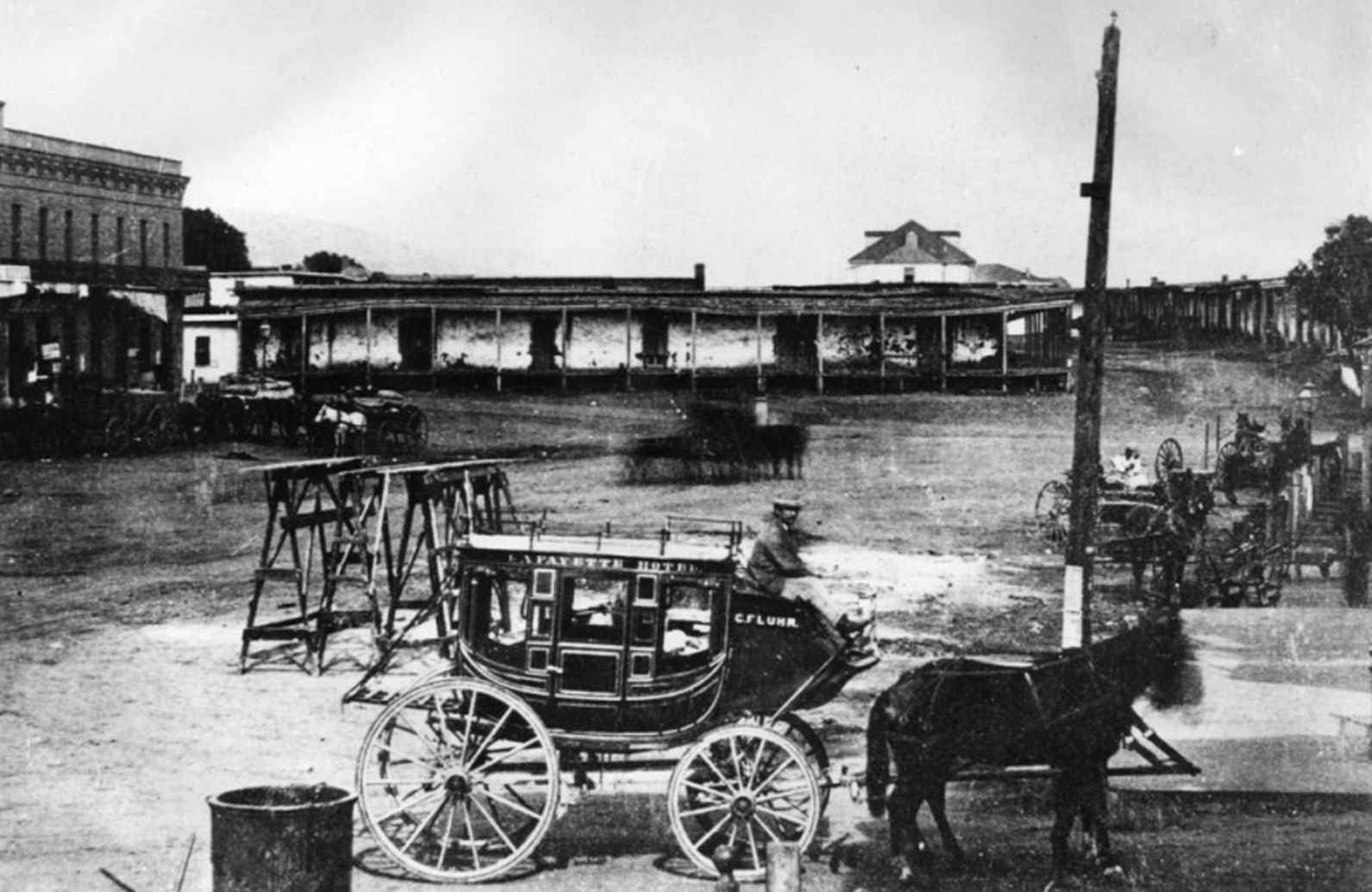
Broad Place at north end of Los Angeles Street c.1870s. At back, Coronel Adobe (l), Calle de los Negros (r)

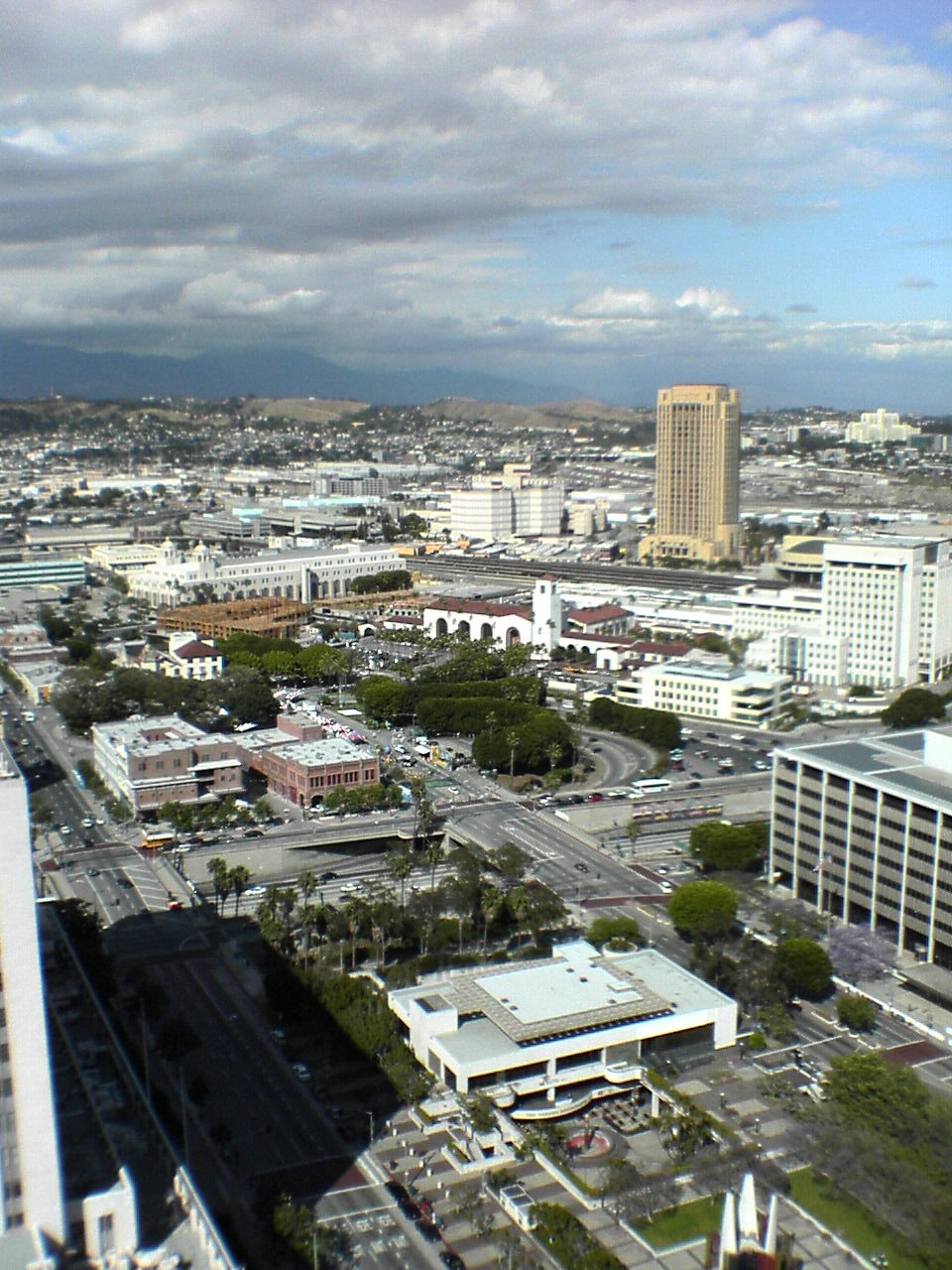
2005 view. Brick buildings at center-left are at the south end of the Plaza. Los Angeles St. runs along the Plaza's right (east) side, south towards the eastern edge of Los Angeles Mall (bottom center). The circular cluster of trees and freeway onramp to the right of the Plaza is the Lugo Adobe site. Behind them is Union Station.

=== Northern end of Los Angeles Street ===
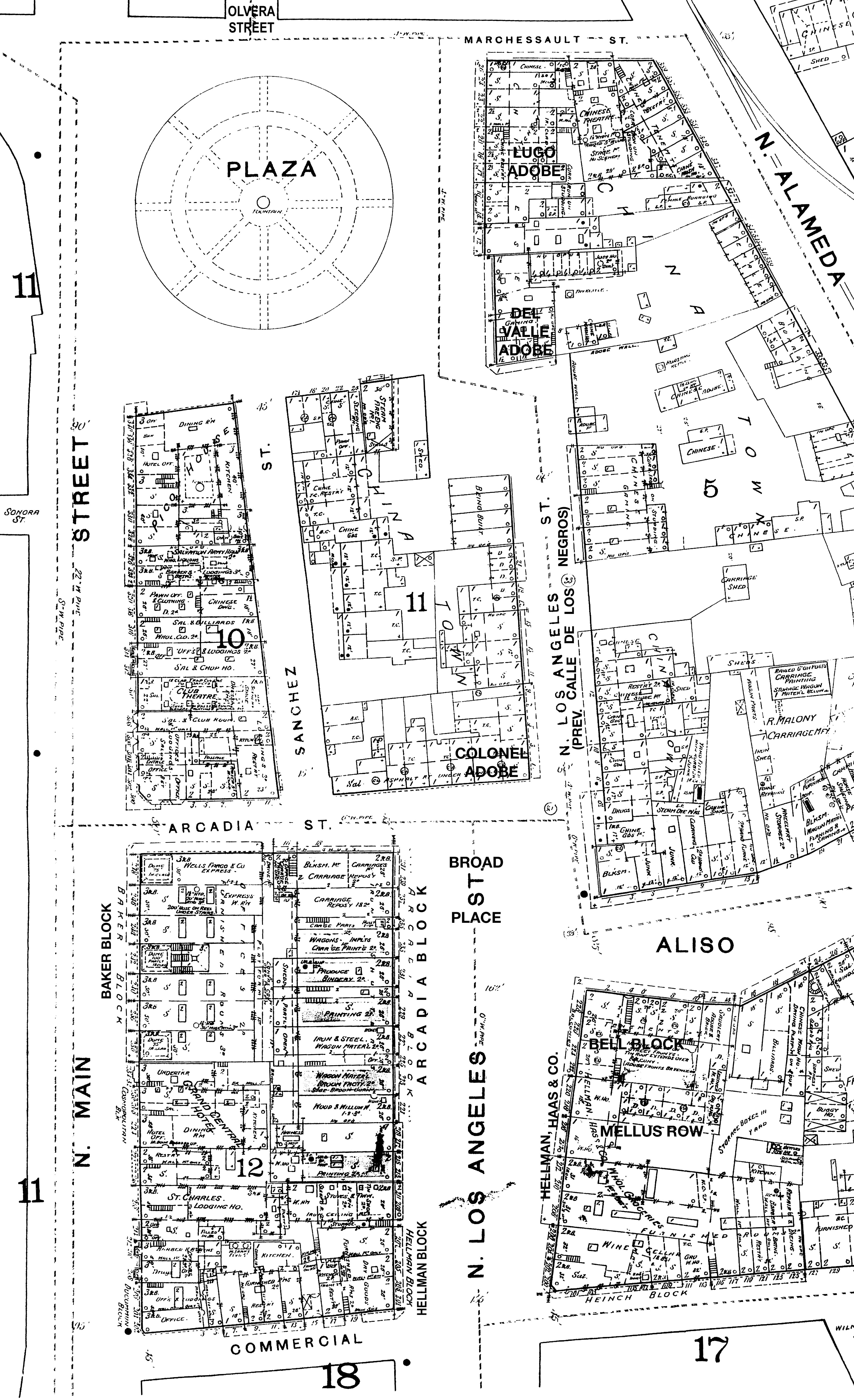
In 1888, Calle de los Negros had just been renamed, and here is marked Los Angeles Street (only the section from Arcadia to the Plaza). In that same year, but not yet reflected on the map, the Coronel Adobe would be removed to allow Los Angeles Street to continue straight north to the Plaza from Broad Place.

The Coronel Adobe was demolished in 1888 and 1896 Sanborn maps show that the Del Valle adobe had been removed, and Los Angeles Street had been extended to form the eastern edge of the Plaza, thus passing in front of the Lugo Adobe. Calle de los Negros remained for a few more decades, behind a row of houses lining the east side of Los Angeles Street between Arcadia and Aliso streets. This was also the western edge of Old Chinatown from around the 1880s through 1930s. It reached eastward across Alameda St. to cover most of the area that is now Union Station. It proceeded one more block past the Plaza, with the buildings on the east side of Olvera Street forming its western edge, until terminating at Alameda Street.

===== Eastern edge of Plaza =====
Since the early 1950s, Los Angeles Street has formed the eastern edge of the Plaza, but the buildings lining its eastern edge, including the Lugo Adobe, were removed. The site is now Father Serra Park.

===== From the Plaza north to Alameda =====
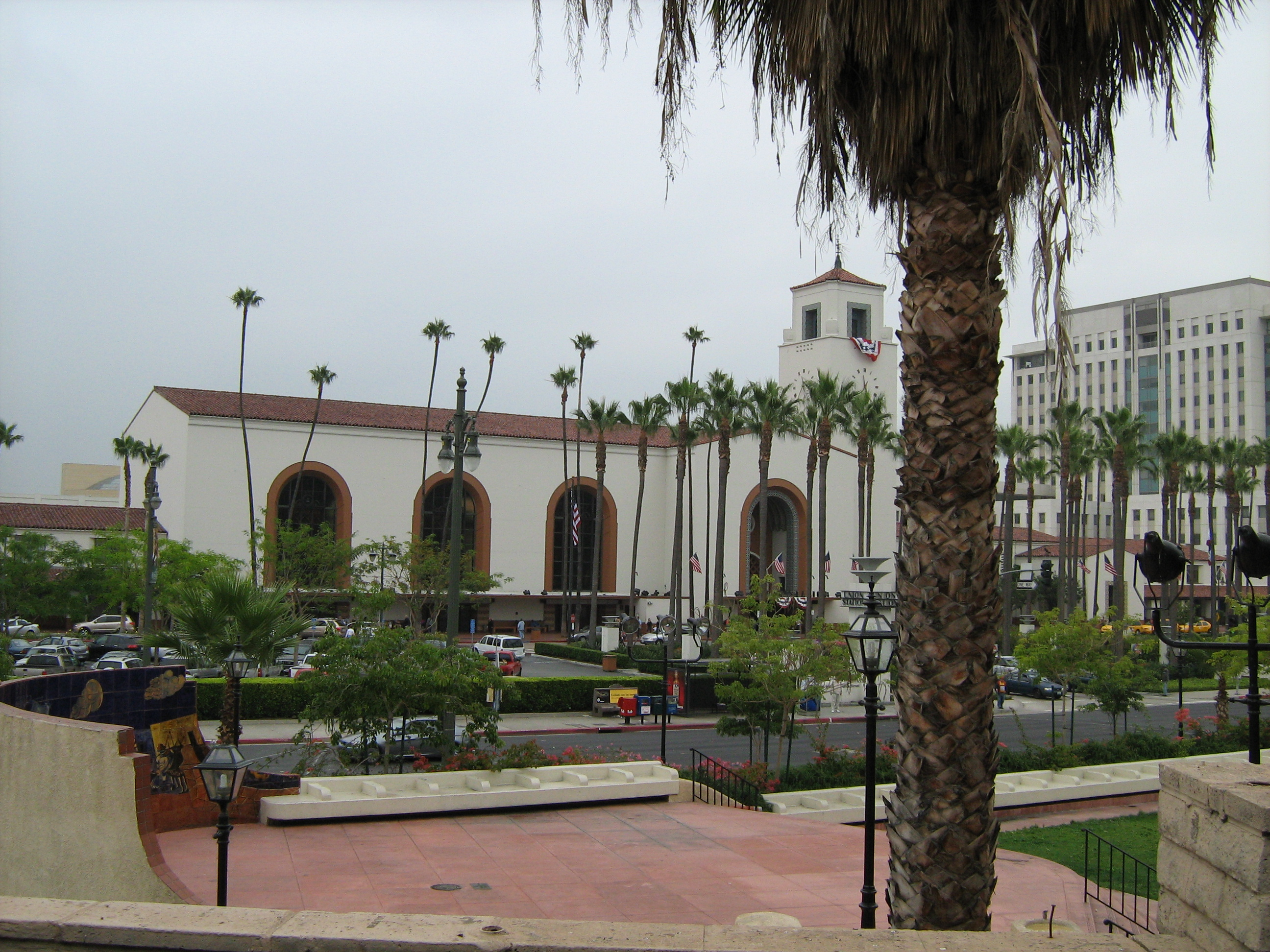
Placita Dolores, where from 1888 until the 1950s, Los Angeles Street used to run a short block north of the Plaza to terminate at Alameda St.

When it was extended past the Plaza in 1888, Los Angeles Street terminated one short block north of the Plaza at Alameda Street. Now, Los Angeles Street turns east at the north side of the Plaza to terminate at Alameda Street at a right angle, directly across from the Union Station complex. What was the short block of Los Angeles Street north of the Plaza is now part of Placita Dolores, a small open plaza which surrounds a statue of Mexican charro entertainer Antonio Aguilar on horseback.

==== Calle de los Negros ====
Until the late 19th century, Los Angeles Street did not form the east side of the Plaza; it ran south only from Broad Place at the intersection of Arcadia Street. Here, the Coronel Adobe blocked the path north one block to the Plaza, but just slightly to the right (east) of the path of Los Angeles Street was Calle de los Negros (Spanish-language name; marked on post-1847 maps as Negro Alley or Nigger Alley), a narrow, one-block north–south street likely named after darker-skinned Mexican afromestizo and/or mulatto residents during the Spanish colonial era.. At the north end of Calle de los Negros stood the Del Valle adobe (also known as the Matthias or Matteo Sabichi house), at the southern edge of which one could turn left and enter the plaza at its southeast corner. Calle de los Negros was famous for its saloons and violence in the early days of the town, and by the 1880s was considered part of Chinatown, lined with Chinese and Chinese American residences, businesses and gambling dens.

The neglected dirt alley was already associated with vice by the early 1850s, when a bordello and its owner both known as La Prietita (the dark-skinned lady) were active here. Its other businesses included malodorous livery stables, a pawn shop, a saloon, a theater and a connected restaurant. Historian James Miller Guinn wrote in 1896, "in the flush days of gold mining, from 1850 to 1856, it was the wickedest street on earth...In length it did not exceed 500 feet, but in wickedness, it was unlimited. On either side it was lined with saloons, gambling hells, dance houses and disreputable dives. It was a cosmopolitan street. Representatives of different races and many nations frequented it. Here the ignoble red man, crazed with aguardiente, fought his battles, the swarthy Sonorian plied his stealthy dagger, and the click of the revolver mingled with the clink of gold at the gaming table when some chivalric American felt that his word of “honah” had been impugned."

By 1871, the alley was notorious as a "racially, spatially, and morally disorderly place", according to historian César López. It was here that a growing number of Chinese immigrant railroad laborers settled after the completion of the transcontinental railroad in 1869. There, William Estrada notes, the "Chinese of Los Angeles came to fill an important sector of the economy as entrepreneurs. Some became proprietors and employees of small hand laundries and restaurants; some were farmers and wholesale produce peddlers; others ran gambling establishments; and some occupied other areas left vacant by the absence of workers in the gold rush migration to California." The Chinese population increased from 14 in 1860 to almost 200 by 1870. Guinn stated that the alley stayed "wicked" through and after its transition to the city's Old Chinatown.

Calle de los Negros was reconfigured in 1888 when Los Angeles Street was extended north, with a small, shallow row of houses remaining between the new section of Los Angeles street's eastern edge and the western edge of the new, shortened alley. The site of Calle de los Negros is now the Pueblo parking lot and a cloverleaf-style entrance to the US 101 freeway.

==== Coronel Adobe ====
The Coronel Adobe was built in 1840 by Ygnacio Coronel as a family home. It stood at the northwest corner of Arcadia Street and Calle de los Negros; Los Angeles Street terminated at its southern end. The area gradually became an area for gambling and saloons, and upper-class families left to live elsewhere. Around 1849, they sold the house to a "sporting fraternity", which operated a popular 24-hour gambling establishment with games including monte, faro, and poker; up to $200,000 in gold could be seen on the tables at a time. Arguments ensued and murders were frequent. The building later became a dance hall where "lewd women" were employed, aimed at the Mexican-American population. After that, still in the 1850s, it became a grocery and dry goods store (Corbett & Barker), then a storage house for iron and hard lumber for Harris Newmark Co. It was then leased to a Chinese immigrant. In 1871, it was the site of the Chinese massacre of 1871. The Adobe was torn down in 1888 in order to extend Los Angeles Street north past the Plaza.

==== Garnier Building ====
At 419 N. Los Angeles Street, at the northwest corner of Arcadia, is the Garnier Building, built in 1890, part of the Los Angeles' original Chinatown. The southern portion of the building was demolished in the 1950s to make way for the Hollywood Freeway. The Chinese American Museum is now located in the Garnier Building. It should not be confused with another Garnier Block/Building on Main St. a block away now commonly known as Plaza House.

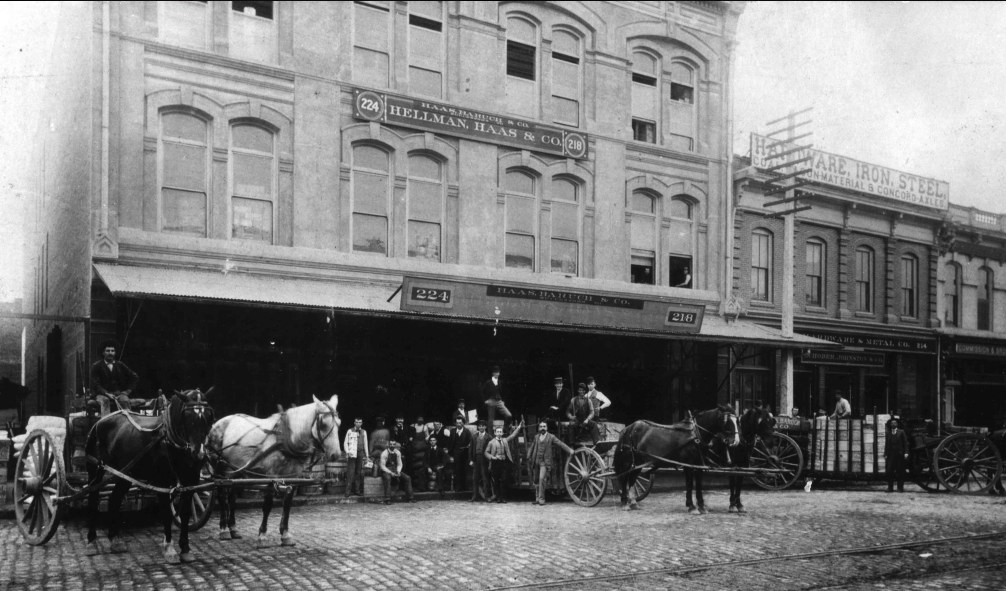
Haas, Baruch & Co., successor to Hellman, Haas & Co., SE corner of Aliso St. c.1890s

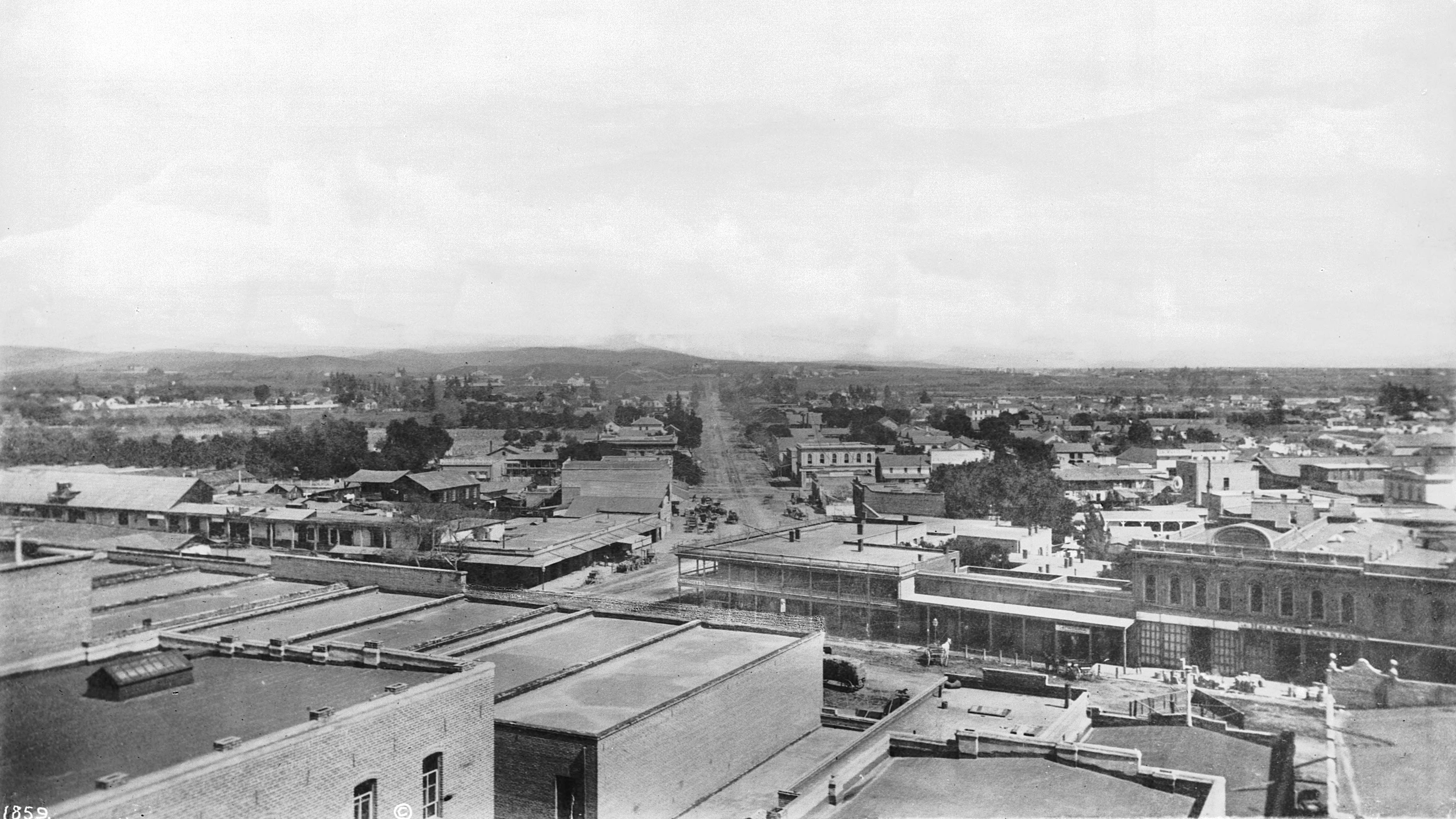
1885 view of the east side of Los Angeles St. with Bell Block at center with its two story porch, to its right Mellus Row, then Hellman, Haas & Co. At center is Aliso St. heading east (top center of photo).

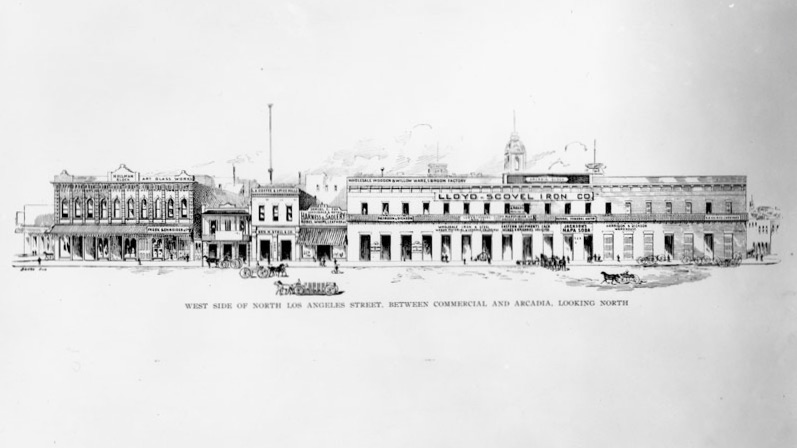
West side of Los Angeles street from Arcadia to Commercial, 1890s. Hellman Block at left, Arcadia Block at right

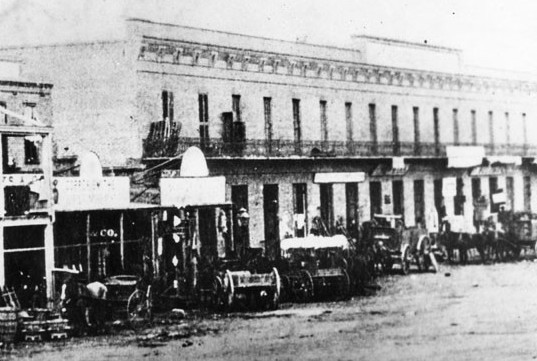
Arcadia Block, 1870s. SW corner of Los Angeles and Arcadia streets.

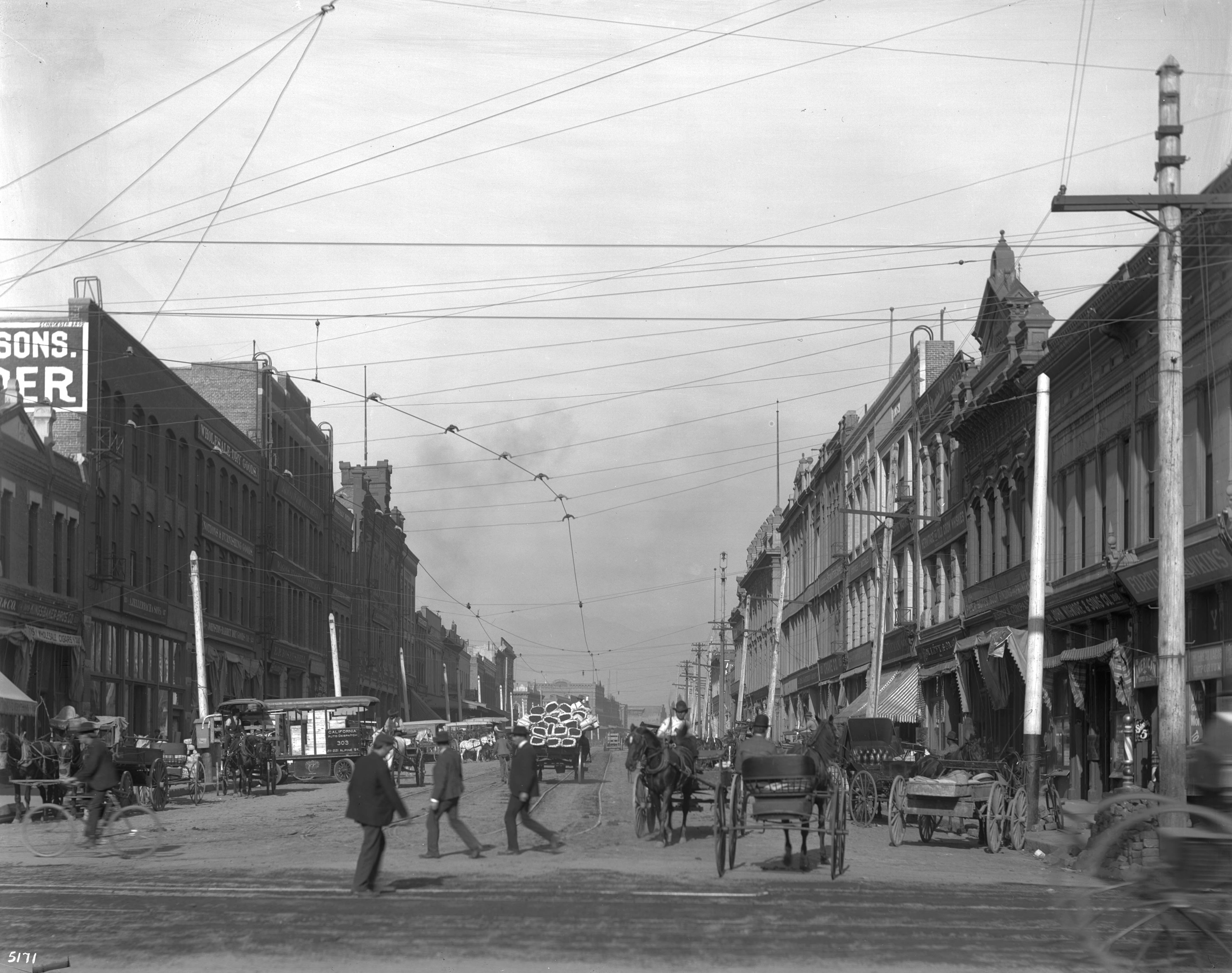
Los Angeles St. north from 1st St. ca. 1910

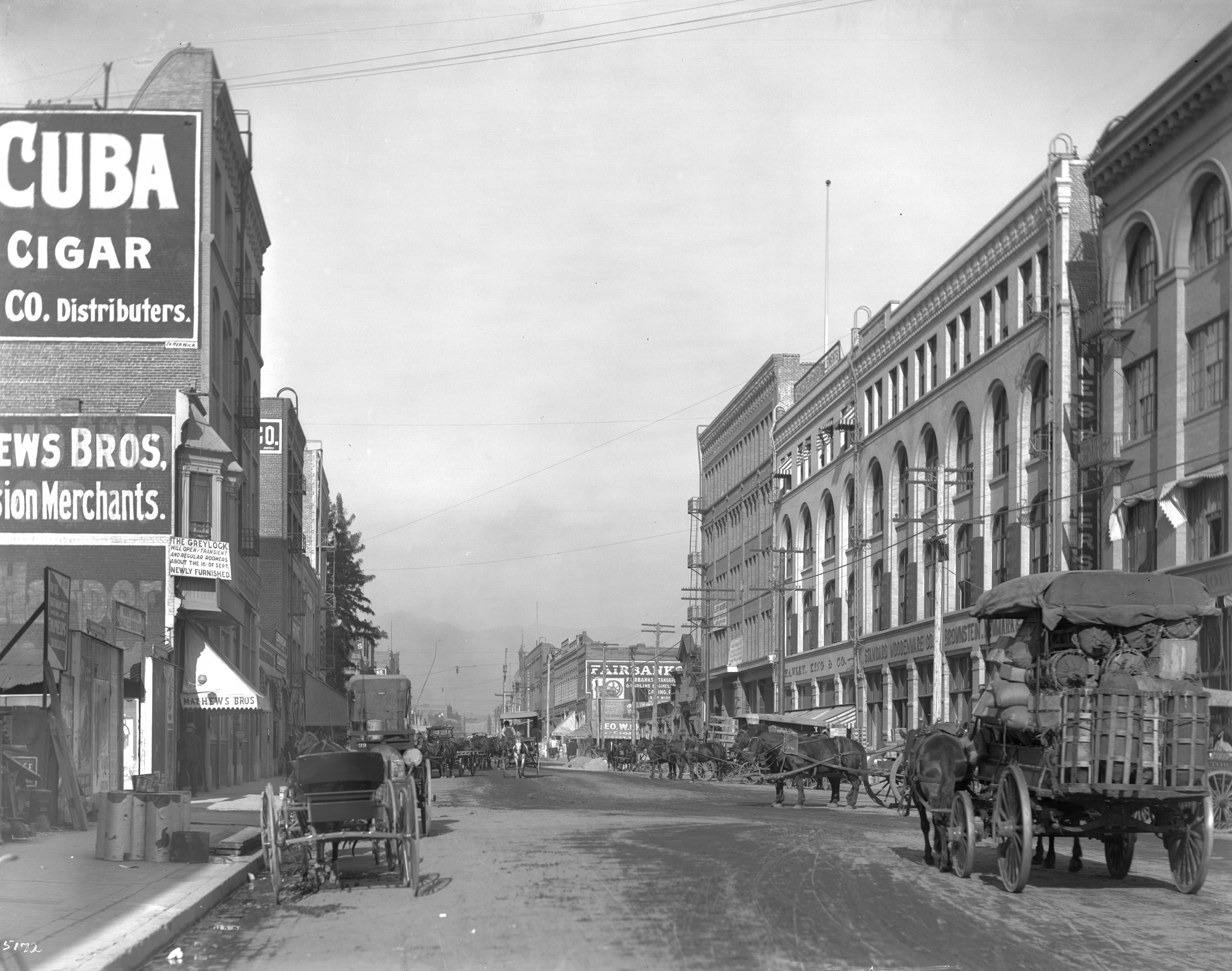
Los Angeles St. north from 3rd St. ca. 1910

Los Angeles Street was lined with mostly commercial buildings; the southeast end of the business district around Los Angeles and 3rd streets was the Wholesale District. Only a few buildings were notable:

=== West side south of Arcadia ===
- Arcadia Block: southwest corner of Arcadia Street. Built 1858, razed in 1927.
- Hellman Block: in 1870, banker and University of Southern California founder Isaias W. Hellman erected the Hellman Block at the northwest corner of Los Angeles and Commercial streets. This is one of several Hellman Blocks or Hellman Buildings in the city.

=== East side south of Aliso ===
- Bell Block was at the southeast corner of Aliso Street. It was General John C. Fremont's headquarters and the first Los Angeles City Hall. Captain Alexander Bell and Mellus lived here (Francis Mellus married a niece of Mrs. Bell's). It was taken over by General Fremont for his headquarters and thus became the state capital for the short period of his acting as governor. The Los Angeles City organization was formed in this building in 1850.
- Mellus Row, adjacent to Bell Block on the south
- Hellman, Haas & Co. grocers (a partnership of Abraham Haas and Herman W. Hellman), the predecessors of Smart & Final. Located in the 1880s and 1890s at 218-224 (pre-1890 numbering, post-1890 numbering: 318-324) N. Los Angeles St., adjacent to Mellus Row on the south. Not to be confused with the Haas Building.
- Between Aliso and Temple streets on the east side of Los Angeles St. at #300 is the Federal Building, opened in 1965-6, architect Welton Becket. Temple was extended east of Main Street between Aliso Street and a street that was known as both Requena and Market street. Adjacent and to its east is the Edward R. Roybal Federal Building and United States Courthouse, completed in 1992.
- Between Temple and First streets is Parker Center, the Los Angeles Police Department headquarters from 1955–2009
- At the southeast corner of First Street, Little Tokyo begins. At this corner was the Tomio Department Store, and two more Japanese-American department stores, the Asia Company and Hori Brothers were located east of it on 1st Street during the 1920s. Now the site of Weller Court and the DoubleTree by Hilton Hotel Los Angeles Downtown, formerly the New Otani Hotel.

== Transportation ==
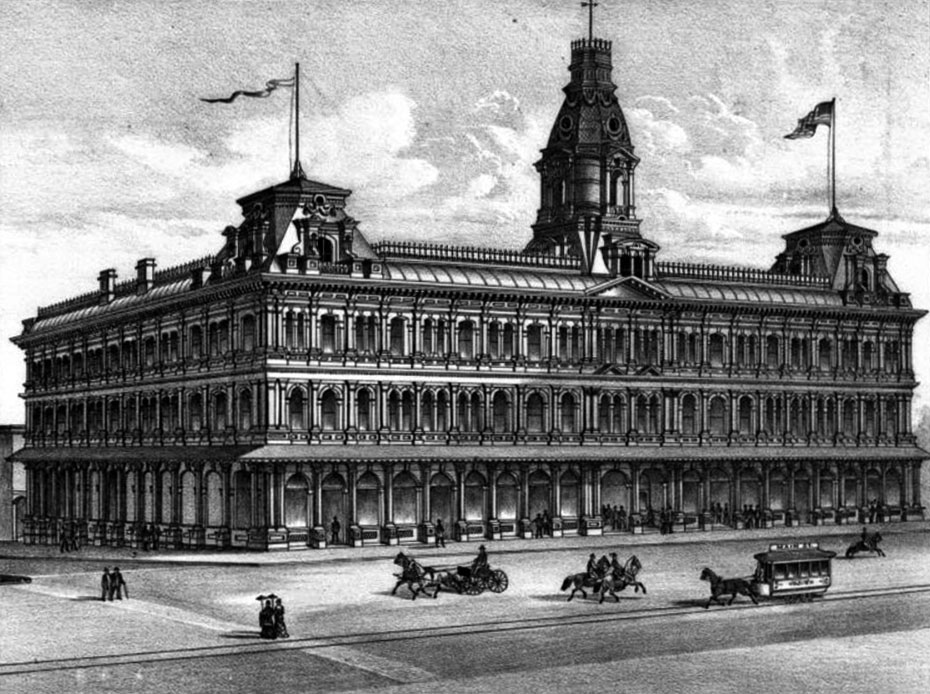
Lithograph showing the Baker Block and horse-drawn streetcar, c.1890

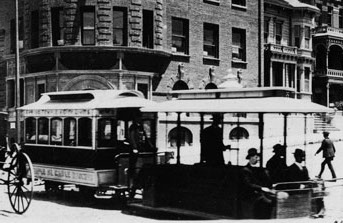
Cable car of the Temple Street Cable Railway in 1890 at Fort (Broadway) at Temple streets looking northwest

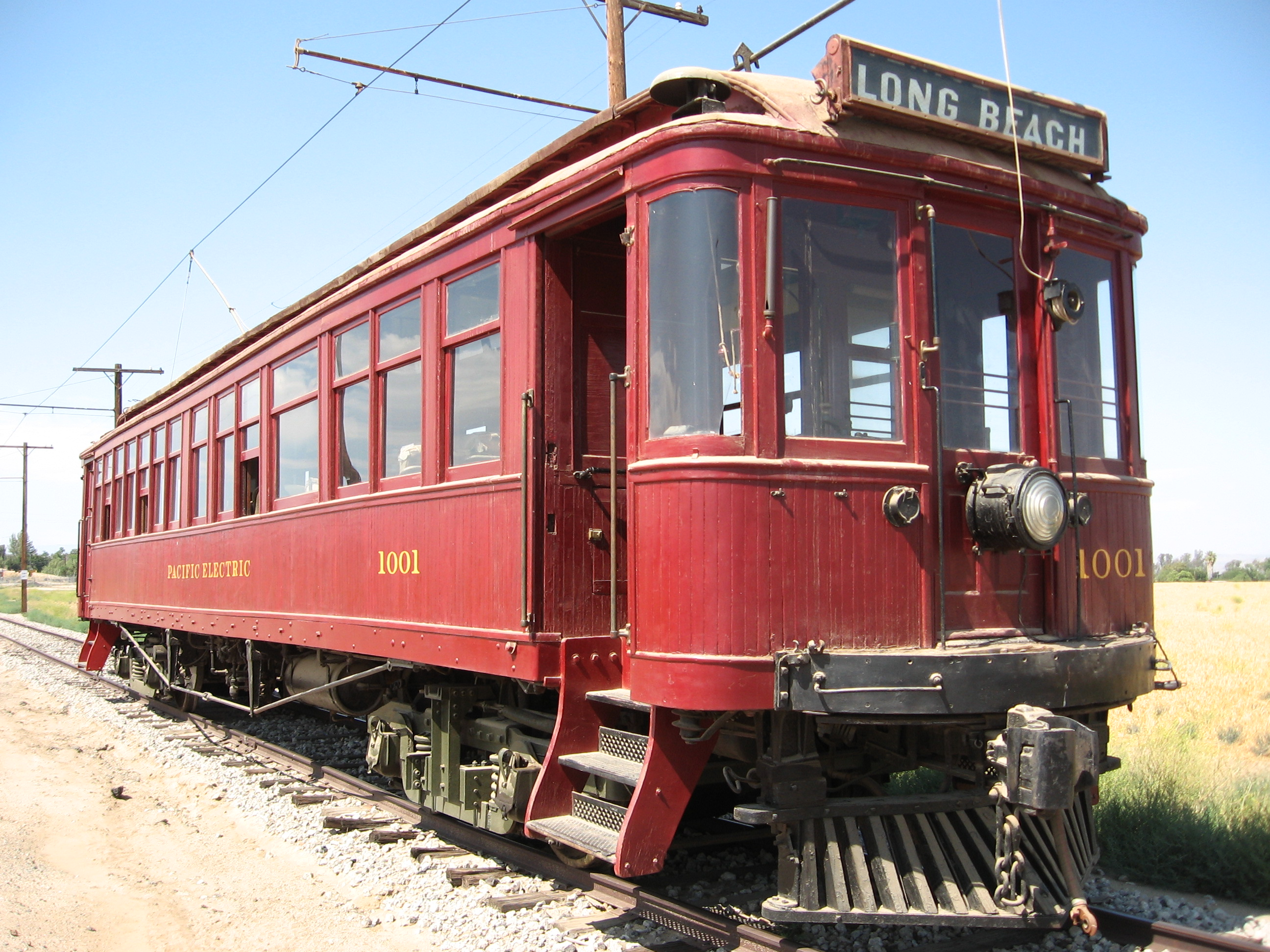
"Red car" of the Pacific Electric

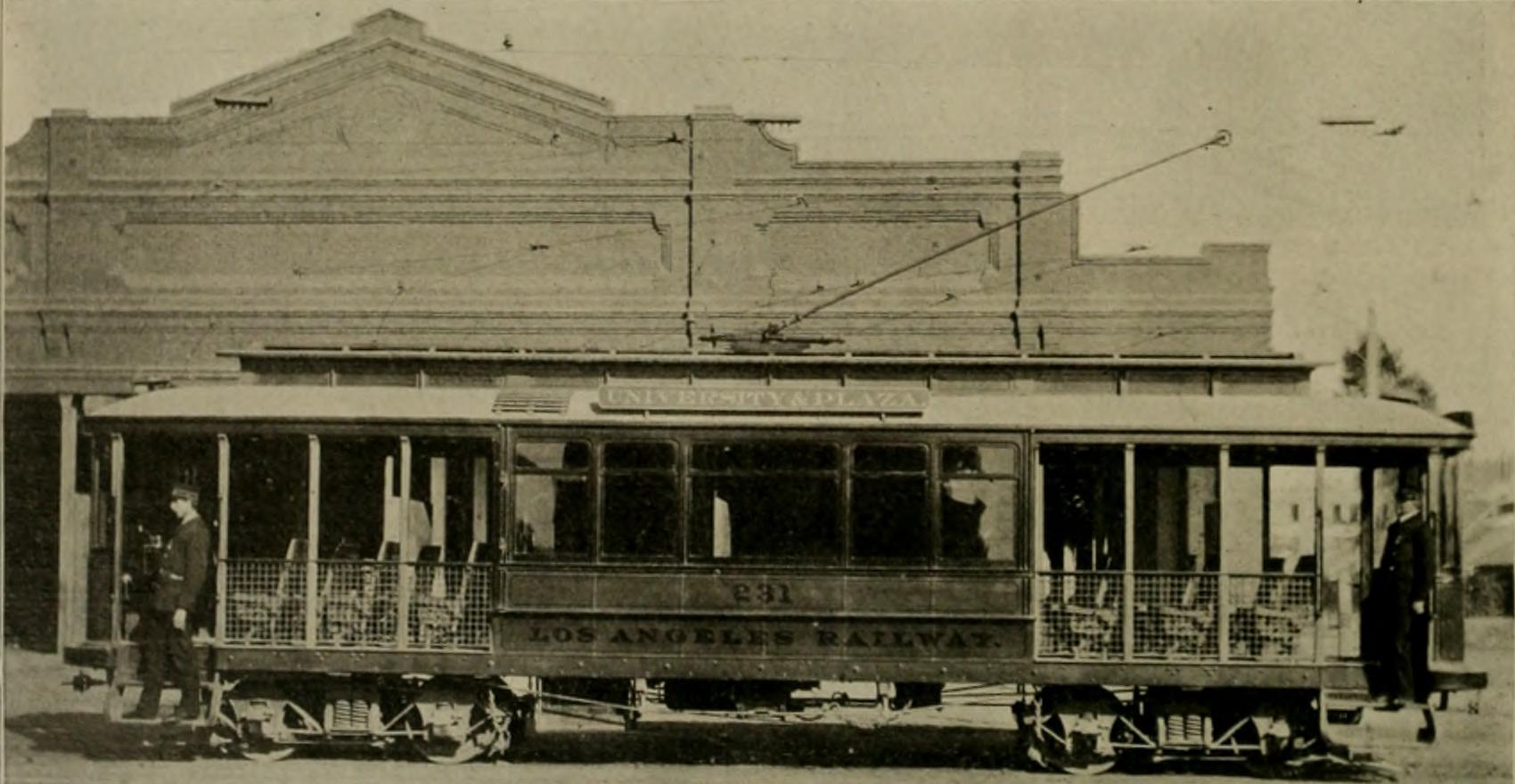
A Los Angeles Railway electric streetcar, 1891

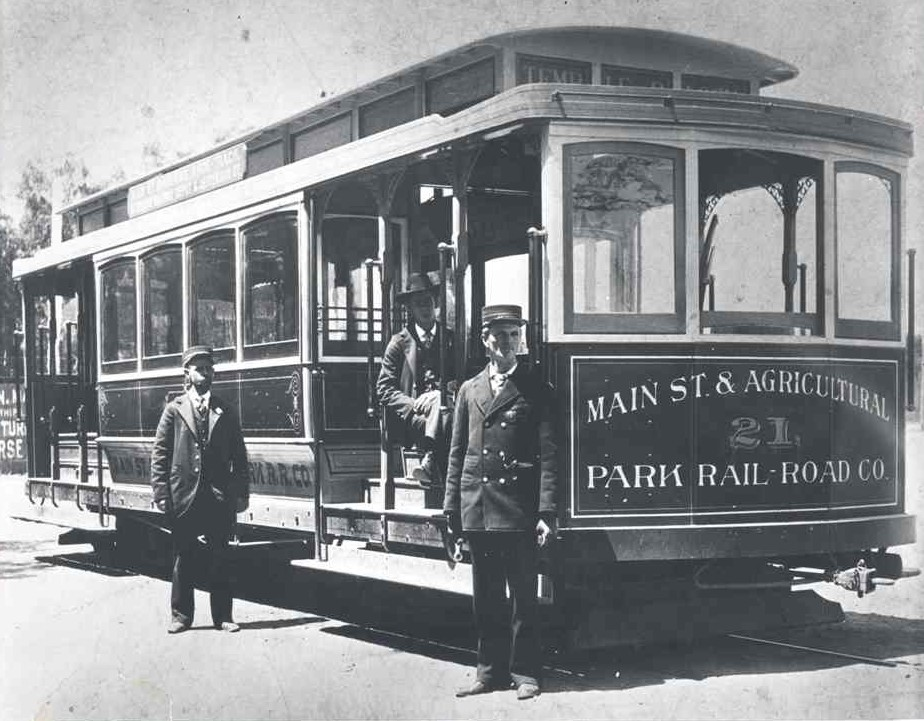
Main Street & Agricultural Park electric streetcar, c.1896

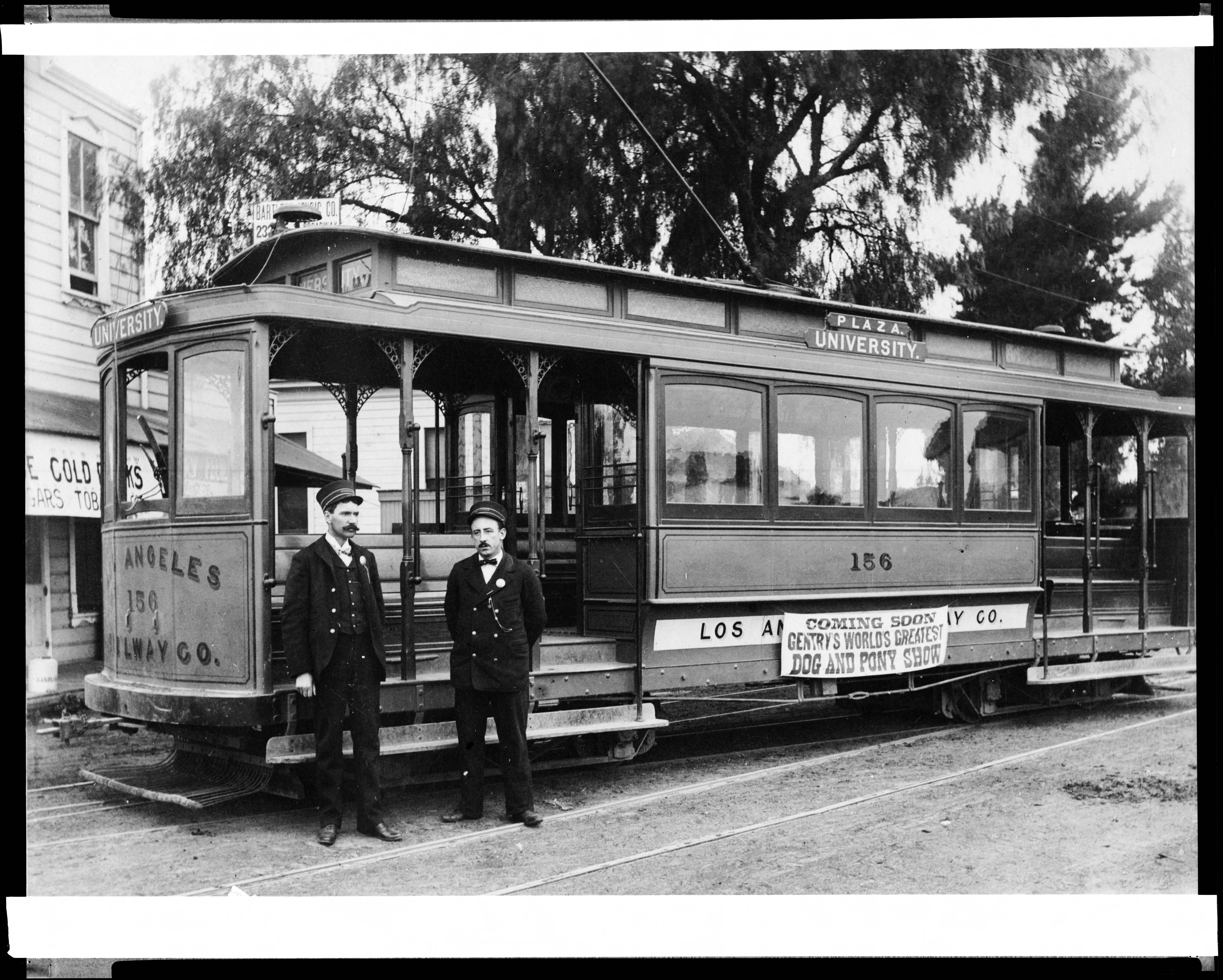
A Los Angeles Railway electric streetcar, c.1900-1910

=== Horsecars (1874–1897) ===
- Horse-drawn streetcars started with the Spring and Sixth Street Railroad in 1874. The last horsecars were converted to electric in 1897.

=== Cable cars (1885–1902) ===
Cable car street railways in Los Angeles first began operating up Bunker Hill in 1885, with a total of three companies operating in the period through 1902, when the lines were electrified and electric streetcars were introduced largely following the cable car routes. There were roughly 25 miles of routes, connecting 1st and Main in what was then the Los Angeles Central Business District as far as the communities known today as Lincoln Heights, Echo Park/Filipinotown, and the Pico-Union district.

=== Electric streetcar systems (1887–1963) ===
Electrically-powered streetcar systems were numerous starting with the Los Angeles Electric Railway in 1887, but were over time consolidated into two large networks:

- In 1901, Henry Huntington bought various electric streetcar companies operating mostly within the City of Los Angeles (and not in the San Fernando Valley, Harbor area or Westside) and combined them into the Los Angeles Railway with its "yellow cars".
- In 1902, Huntington and banker Isaias W. Hellman established the Pacific Electric Railway, which would acquire other railways, providing interurban service to surrounding towns in what is now Greater Los Angeles (Los Angeles, Orange, San Bernardino and Riverside counties) and new suburban developments. The Pacific Electric Building, with station underneath, was opened in 1905 at 6th and Main Street.

=== Funiculars ===
Angel's Flight and Court Flight were funicular railways operating from Broadway up Bunker Hill.

=== Railroad depots ===
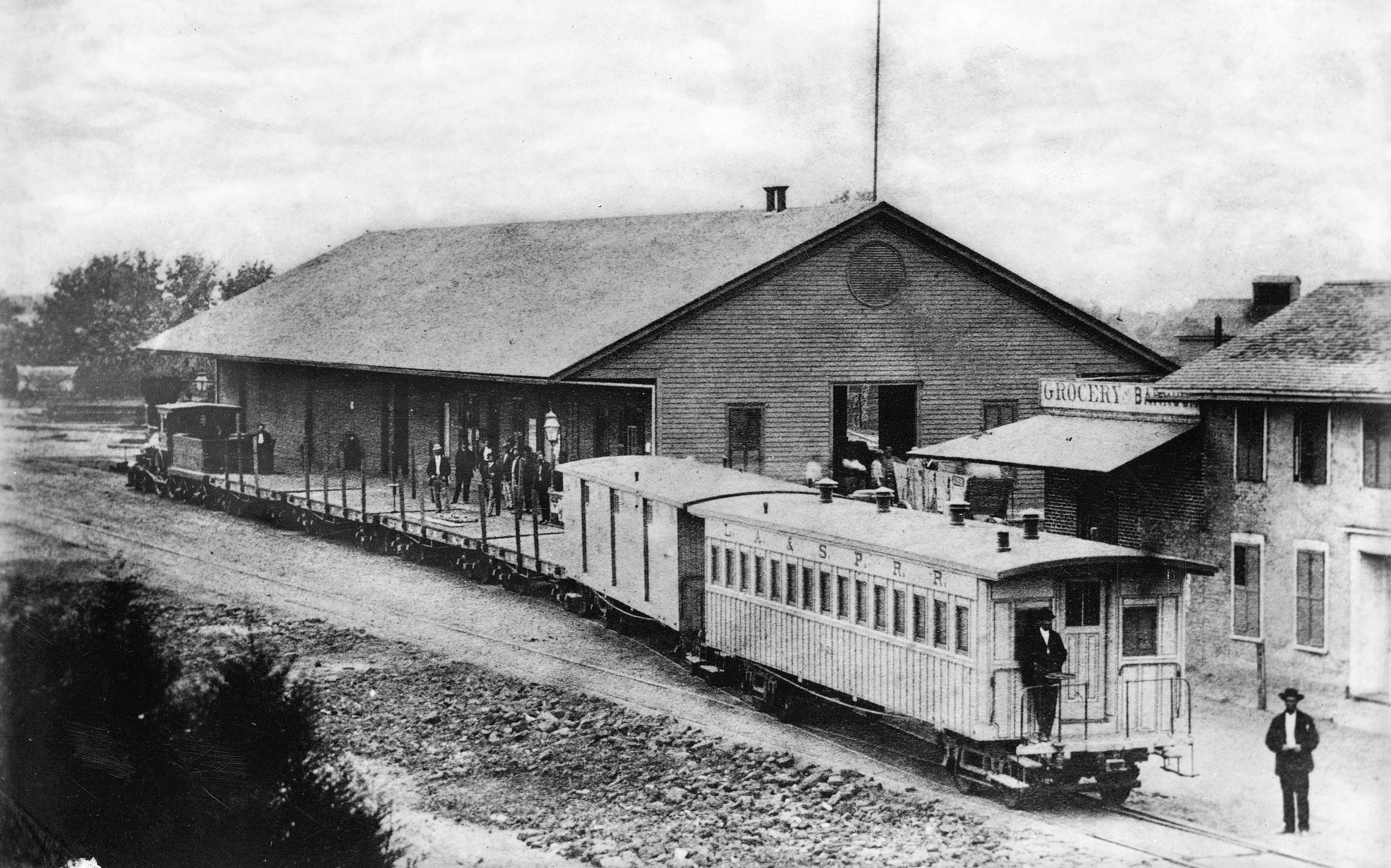
Los Angeles & San Pedro Railroad Depot, SW corner Alameda and Commercial streets, c.1880

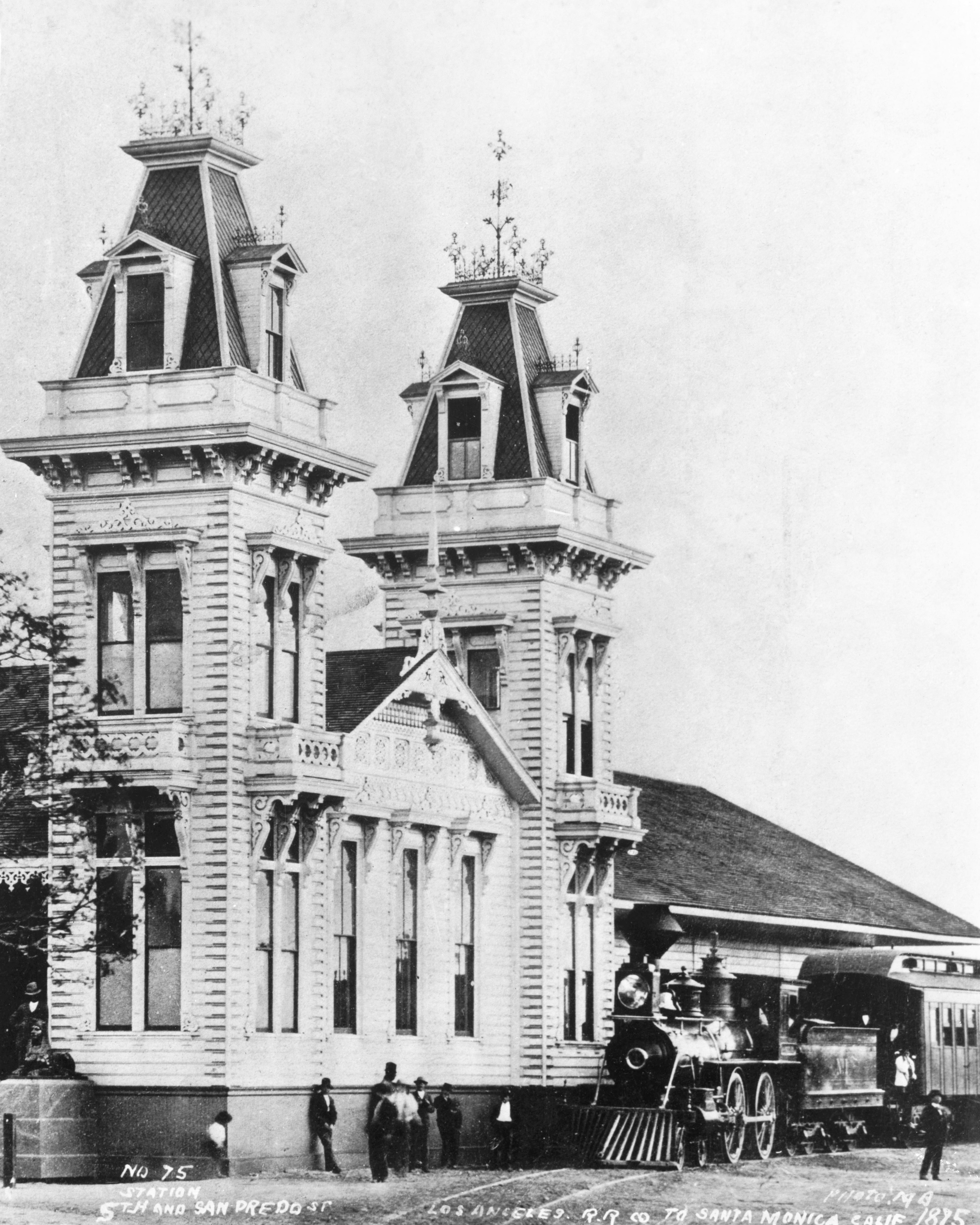
Los Angeles and Independence Railroad Depot, 5th & San Pedro streets, c.1875

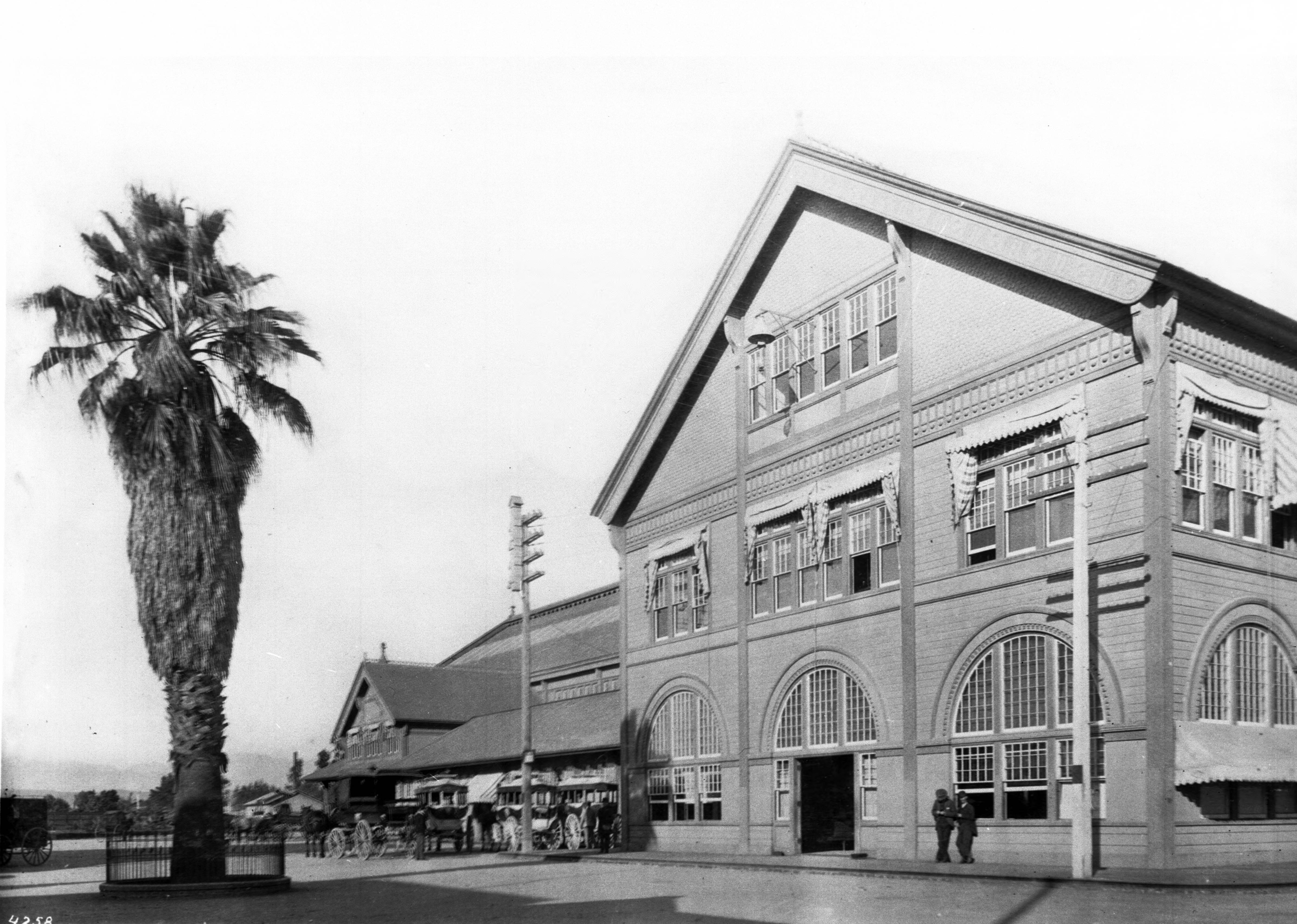
Southern Pacific Railroad's Arcade Depot, Alameda between 5th/6th, c.1895-1900

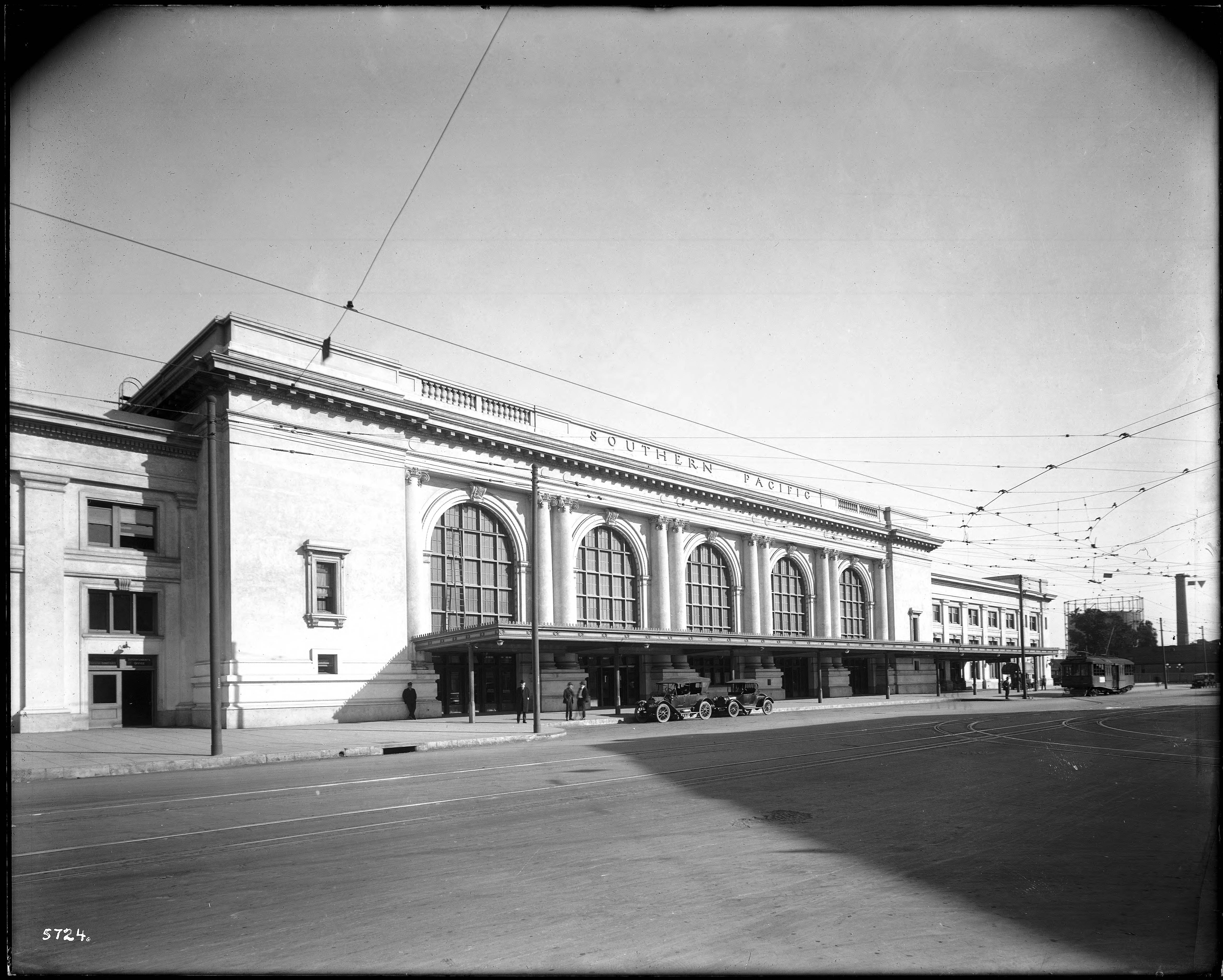
Central Station of the Southern Pacific Railroad c.1918, Central & 5th streets, c.1918

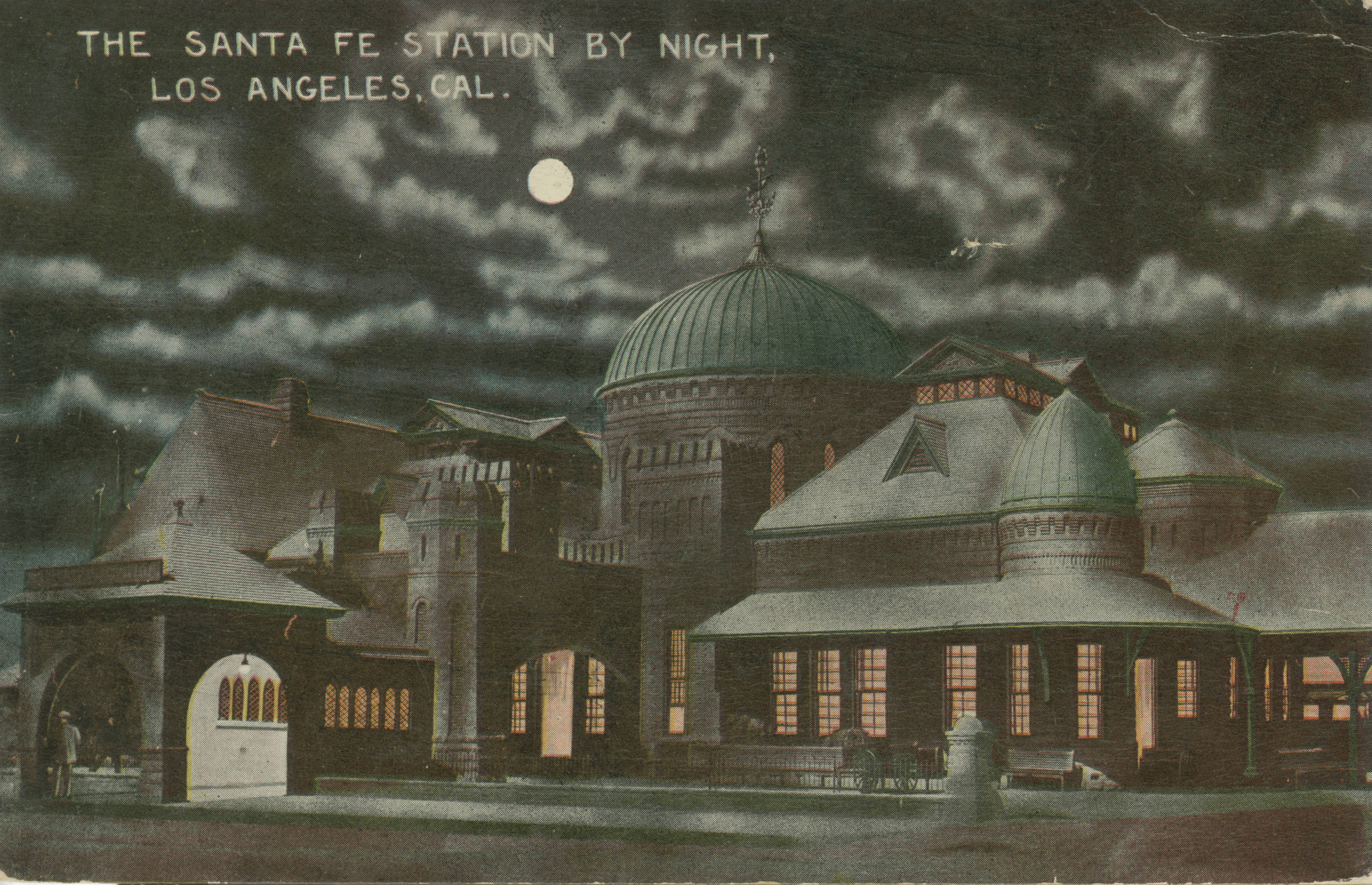
La Grande Station of the Atchison, Topeka and Santa Fe Railway, Santa Fe and 2nd streets, c.1915
- Los Angeles & San Pedro Railroad Depot, SW corner Alameda and Commercial streets
- Los Angeles and Independence Railroad Depot, San Pedro and 5th street (southeast of the business district)
- Arcade Depot of the Southern Pacific Railroad along Alameda Street between 5th to 6th streets. Opened 1888, closed 1914.
- La Grande Station of the Atchison, Topeka and Santa Fe Railway, Santa Fe at 2nd (East of the business district), opened 1893, closed 1939
- Central Station of the Southern Pacific Railroad, Central and 5th streets (southeast of the business district), opened 1914. Union Pacific Railroad started operating from the station in 1924. Disused 1939.
- Union Station was opened in 1939, replacing the existing Central and La Grande stations.

== Landmarks shown on schematic map ==
This is a map of the former and current buildings located in the Victorian business district of Los Angeles around 1890–1905.

Abbreviations and notes

- CH = Concert Hall
- "Female boarding" was a euphemism for small rooms, "cribs", used by prostitutes.
- †(Dagger) indicates a street that no longer exists

Building numbering is according to the system introduced in 1890.

To be read like a map:

For the area to the north, see Los Angeles Plaza Historic District

now US 101 1951–pres

f
o
r
m
e
r

F
O
R
T

S
T.

n
o
w

B
R
O
A
D
W
A
Y

now US 101

f
o
r
m
e
r

B
U
E
N
A
V
I
S
T
A

S
T.

now US 101

f
o
r
m
e
r

N
E
W

H
I
G
H

S
T.

now US 101 1951–pres
S
P
R
I
N
G

S
T.

E
X
T
E
N
S
I
O
N

1
9
3
1
now US 101 Hollywood Freeway 1951–pres

M
A
I
N

S
T
R
E
E
T

Stearns House 1835-77/
BAKER BLOCK 1875–1942
now US 101

Arcadia Block 1858–1927
now US 101

L
O
S

A
N
G
E
L
E
S

S
T
R
E
E
T

Calle de los Negros
now US 101

FORT MOORE

ST.

ARCADIA STREET former route
ALISO fmr. rt.

201–21 W. Temple, 131 W. Temple
p1906: Hotel Aberdeen – County Jail

315 N Spring
211 W. Temple

Hall of Justice 1925–pres ----------

north side of Temple from Broadway to Spring St. ext.

335–47 N
Lafayette Hotel/
Cosmopolitan Hotel/
St. Elmo Hotel 1850s–?

301–25 N
1st Downey Block ?–1871
2nd Downey Block 1871–?
Post Office & Courthouse 1910-1937
Spring St. US Courthouse 1940–pres

Grand Central Hotel 1876–?

Pico Bldg/ Farmers & Merchants Bank 1867–1957

Bella Union/St. Charles Hotel 1835–1940

Ducommun Block/Security Pacific Bank

now part of Los Angeles Mall

Hellman Block 1870–?

now part of Los Angeles Mall

300–16 N
Bell Block (aka Bell's Row, Mellus Row) c.1845–92

318–24 N
Hellman, Haas & Co. 1880s-90s/
Haas, Baruch & Co p1906

block is now
300 N. L. A. St. Federal Bldg
1965 arch. Welton Becket

SAND/CALIFORNIA
ex-COMMERCIAL ST.
ex-COMM. ST.

313 N
p1894:
St. Nicholas Hotel

301–5 N
1888–1950s:
Temperance Temple
now L. A. Co. Heating & Refrigeration Plant

240 N Mascarel-Barri adobe 1850s

Arbuckle dry goods 1850s
John Jones wholesale grocery 1850s

Adolph Portugal dry goods 1854–65
Hellman dry goods 1865–8
Polaski and Goodwin's dry goods 1868–c.1878

Farmers & Merchants Bank p1894–d
U.S. Nat'l Bank p1906–d

236 N L. A. Savings Bank p1894–d

226–8 N Commercial Bank 1870s/
1st Nat'l Bank 1880–d

now part of Los Angeles Mall north block

230–4 N
White House hotel 1872–81/
Smith's hotel, rest. p1882–4/
European Hotel p1894/
New Arlington Hotel c.1910s
block is now
300 N. L. A. St. Federal Bldg
1965 arch. Welton Becket

TEMPLE STREET

214–22 N New Lanfranco Block 1888–d
TEMPLE STREET extended 1930

TEMPLE ST.
1930–pres

Hall of Records 1962–pres

Pound Cake Hill
lowered c.1887–90, leveled 1961

High School 1873-87d/
"Red Sandstone" Courthouse 1891-1936d
Plaza de Justicia public space –1961 now County Courthouse 1972–pres

L.A. Co. Hall of Records 1911-73d

| 203–9 N |
| ds 1895–7 City of Paris |
| 171–201 N |
| c.1882/3–1920s Jones Block |
| J. W. Robinson's | 201–25 |
| ds 1886–95 | Main St. |
| Spring St.→ | TEMPLE |
| before → | BLOCK |
| 1930→ | 1858/71–1927 |
| | ex-MARKET ST. |
| | Clock Tower Courthouse |
| | 1858-95 |
| | Bullard Block 1895-1925 |
| | now City Hall 1928-present |

now part of Los Angeles Mall south block

bldgs
N
of
Market

former REQUENA ST.
former MARKET ST.

United States Hotel 1861–1939
Now part of L. A. Mall south block

now City Hall East 1972–pres

Parker Center (former LAPD HQ)

Hotel Broadway d

Court Flight Funicular 1905–1943

PHILLIPS BLOCK
1887–1912
Hamburger's Peoples Store 1888–1908

S
P
R
I
N
G

S
T
R
E
E
T
ex-COURT ST.
former FRANKLIN ST.

128-38 N
Jacoby Bros. DS 1879–1900

100-10 N
L. A. Nat'l Bank Bldg 1887–1906
Odd Fellows Lodge p1894/
Equitable Savings Bank Bldg 1906-20s/ Now park at City Hall

125-31 N
Hall of the Amigos del País c.1844-47/
Dos Amigos bar c.1850/60s-70s/
McDonald Blk c.1876-?

121-7 N
Jacoby Bros. DS 1879–1900

101-11 N
Lichtenberger Block
now park at City Hall

now part of L. A. Mall south block

German-American
Savings Bank
1894–1906
now part of L .A. Mall south block

Tajo Bldg 1896–mid-20th c.
now Law Library

Los
Angeles
Times
Bldg
#3, 1912–38
now vacant lot

Larronde Block 1892-c.1930/
Calif. State Bldg. 1931–1976
now vacant lot

FIRST ST.
FIRST ST.
FIRST ST.
FIRST ST.
FIRST ST.

107: Old J. Serra State Office Bldg 1958–2006

now 1st St. Courthouse
2016, entire block

#127 Mason Opera House 1902-56

#141–145
Frost (Haig M. Prince) Bldg 1898–1960 JP

Parking structure 1960–97

Culver Block/
now Times Mirror Sq. Pereira Bldg
1973–pres

128-130
Southwest Bldg 1903–?
Chamber of Commerce;
The Herald

Nadeau H. 1882–1932
now Times Mirror Sq. Kaufmann Bldg 1935–pres.

Wilson Block
1886–d
Natick House
1883–1950 JP

#110: Grand Opera House/
Orpheum Theatre #1

Now Caltrans
(entire block)

Doubletree Hotel
(ex-New Otani) 1977–pres
Weller Court mall

1st Roeder Blk
Bryson Blk
Mueller's Blk

Now LAPD HQ
2009, entire block

#138 Hellman Bldg.
1897-1959
now parking garage

Bryson-Bonebrake
Block 1888
now Times Mirror Sq.
Crawford Bldg 1948–pres

Corfu Hotel

Burdick Blockk/
American Bank Bldg 1888-d

Newell Block

SECOND ST.
SECOND ST.
SECOND ST.
SECOND ST.
SECOND ST.

201-5
American Nat'l/California Bank 1878-1911/ 2nd Calif. Bank Bldg 1911–?

now Broadway Media Center

200-4
1st Presbyterian Church 1890s d
Nolan, Smith & Bridge Bldg d

206-10
Gordon Bldg d
New King Hotel

201-13
Hollenbeck Block 1884–1933d RBY
Hollenbeck Hotel
Coulter's DS 1884–98

now Historic Broadway light rail station,
proposed 222 W. 2nd 30-fl. res

200–10
Wilcox Bldg
1895/6–pres

Higgins Bldg. 1910

Little Tokyo district

207-11
YMCA Bldg 1889-1911/
Merchants Trust Co. Bldg. 1910–?
now parking lot

213-223
Potomac Block 1890–1953
Ville de Paris DS 1893–1905
Coulter's DS 1905–17
now parking lot

237-41
J. W. Robinson's Boston Dry Goods 1895–1915
Now church

Now parking garage.

212-6
Crocker Bldg
Victor Clothing 1926–1964

218-24
Temple B’nai B’rith1872/3–95
Copp Bldg 1896–pres
Pig 'n Whistle

226-8
City Hall 1888-1928

Now parking garage.

240-6
Hosfield Bldg 1914–pres
City Hall North
Natatorium
Victor Clothing 1964–2001

Now parking garage.

225-235
Perry Bldg

227
1st Los Angeles Theatre/
2nd Orpheum Theatre/
Lyceum Theatre
1888–1941

229
Turnverein (Lyceum) Hall 1894–1950s

243-7
Woollacott Bldg

Now parking garage.

212–8
Wilcox Annex

220–8
Stowell Block p1894
L. A. Athletic Club p1894
German Bldg p1906

230–4
Workman Block p1894

251
1924–40: Arrow Th.
1940–5: Aztec Th.
1945–80: Linda Lea Th.
2007–8: Imaginasian Th.
2008–20: Downtown Independent th.

214
St. Vibiana Bldg 1876–pres
cathedral 1876–1994
now culinary event center

249–59
Irvine Byrne Block, now Pan American Lofts 1895–pres

248-62
Rindge Bldg c.1901–pres

Metropolitan Barber Shop

249-257
Douglas Bldg 1897–pres

250-60
Stimson Bldg 1893–1963

Now misc. retail
Now parking garage.
THIRD ST.
THIRD ST.
THIRD ST.
THIRD ST.
THIRD ST.
Hotel Ramona (?-1903)/
Million Dollar Theatre 1917-pres
Bradbury Building 1893–pres
Washington Bldg. 1912

Lankershim Bldg.
1897–1959d, Robert Brown Young
Now Reagan Bldg.

Wesley Roberts Bldg.
Now Reagan Bldg.
Now parking lot.

For the area to the south, see Historic Core

== See also ==
- Sonoratown, Los Angeles
- Old Chinatown, Los Angeles
