= Roeder Blocks =

Historic commercial buildings in Los Angeles developed by Louis Roeder

The Roeder Blocks refer to two historically significant commercial buildings in Los Angeles, California, developed by Louis Roeder in the late 19th century. These buildings — Roeder Block I and Roeder Block II — served as architectural and commercial landmarks during a period of rapid growth in Los Angeles. Both buildings have since been demolished.

== Origins ==
Carriage Shop
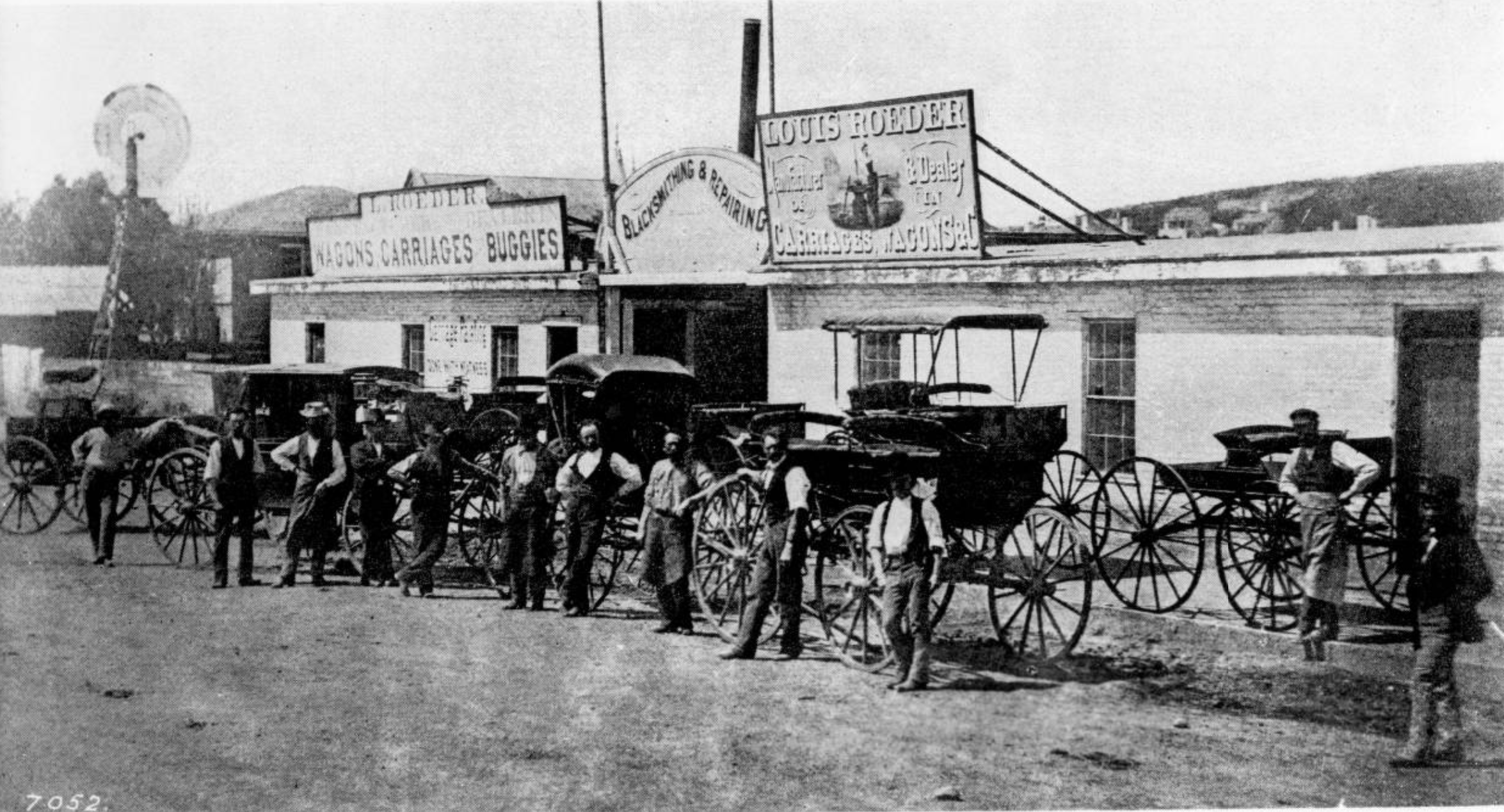
- Alternative names: Wagon, Carriages and Buggies

General information
- Status: Demolished
- Type: Workshop
- Location: 23 S. Spring Street, Los Angeles, United States
- Coordinates: 34.052934°N 118.244462°W
- Owner: Louis Roeder

Before developing the Roeder Blocks, Louis Roeder operated a blacksmith and carriage shop at 23 S. Spring Street. Historical photographs document the shop on the west side of Spring Street just south of First Street, circa 1878. By 1880, a photograph documents men and carriages in front of Roeder's wagon and carriage dealership near Spring and Second Streets, at approximately 85 South Spring Street, just north of Second Street. This location would later become the site of Roeder Block I.

Prior to Roeder's ownership, the Spring Street lot had a notable commercial history. It had previously served as the Los Angeles office of the Overland Stage Company, where passengers could purchase tickets to St. Louis for two hundred dollars. Merchant and memoirist Harris Newmark recorded that the lot was "later bought by Louis Roeder for a wagon-shop, and now the site of the Roeder Block."

By the time of Spring Street's emergence as the city's main commercial corridor in the 1870s and 1880s, Roeder's shop was among the businesses that supplied transportation infrastructure for farmers, merchants, and families at a time when horses and wagons were still the primary means of moving people and goods around Los Angeles, connecting the growing downtown with outlying ranches and settlements.

Before establishing his own shop on Spring Street, Roeder had operated a wagon-making business in partnership with Louis Lichtenberger beginning in 1865. In 1866 the partners purchased a lot at 128 South Main Street and erected a small shop; three years later they expanded to a twostory wagon and blacksmith shop at the northwest corner of Second and Main Streets. After five years of partnership, Roeder sold his interest to Lichtenberger for $13,000 cash.

Following the dissolution of the partnership, Roeder traveled to San Francisco and invested $5,000 in tools and stock, returning to Los Angeles to launch a larger independent operation on Spring Street. Over the following years he acquired a lot measuring 150 by 100 feet at the corner of First and Spring Streets, which would become the site of his commercial development. In 1885, after a long career in the wagon-manufacturing business, Roeder sold his equipment and retired from that trade, turning his attention fully to real estate and the development of the Roeder Blocks.

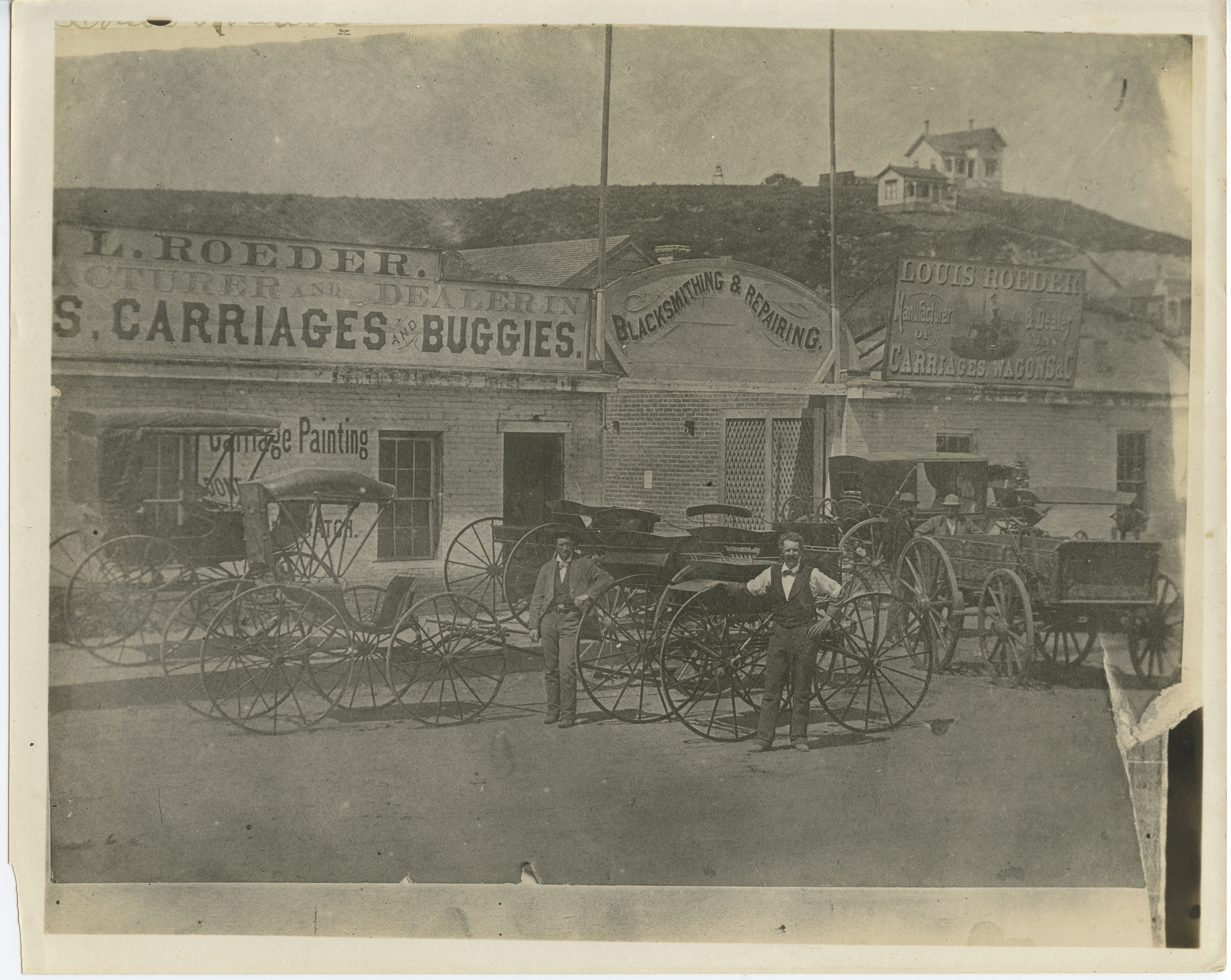
Men with carriages in front of Carriage and Buggy shop, Roeder S. Spring St., Los Angeles

== Civic context ==
During the period in which he was building his commercial presence on Spring Street, Roeder also served on the Los Angeles Common Council. His council tenure included service on the Finance Committee, during which he and fellow councilman Henry Wartenberg became involved in a public dispute in 1869 over the issuance of city scrip to pay contractors for the Commercial Street sewer project. The two men jointly defended their actions in the Los Angeles News of December 19, 1869, stating that they had been authorized by the full council, that no funds had entered their own pockets, and that full vouchers were on file. They requested a formal investigation into the matter. During his council service the franchise was also granted to the Los Angeles City Water Company, one of the most consequential civic decisions of the era.

== Roeder Block I ==
Roeder Block I
- Alternative names: Roeder Block No. 1

General information
- Status: Demolished
- Type: Commercial
- Architectural style: Late 19th-century commercial
- Location: 23 South Spring Street, Los Angeles, United States
- Client: Perlaeph Lodge, storefront tenants
- Owner: Louis Roeder

Technical details
- Floor count: 2

Design and construction
- Architect: Robert Brown Young

Roeder Block I was constructed on the site of Roeder's original carriage shop, itself previously the location of the Overland Stage office on Spring Street. By 1896, it was home to multiple tenants and was known for its location just below the Nadeau Hotel. Though modest in size, the building retained its original foundation and was updated with architectural features that made it a notable presence in the Spring Street corridor. The building was designed by architect Robert Brown Young, who maintained his own office within the block.

== Roeder Block II ==
Roeder Block II
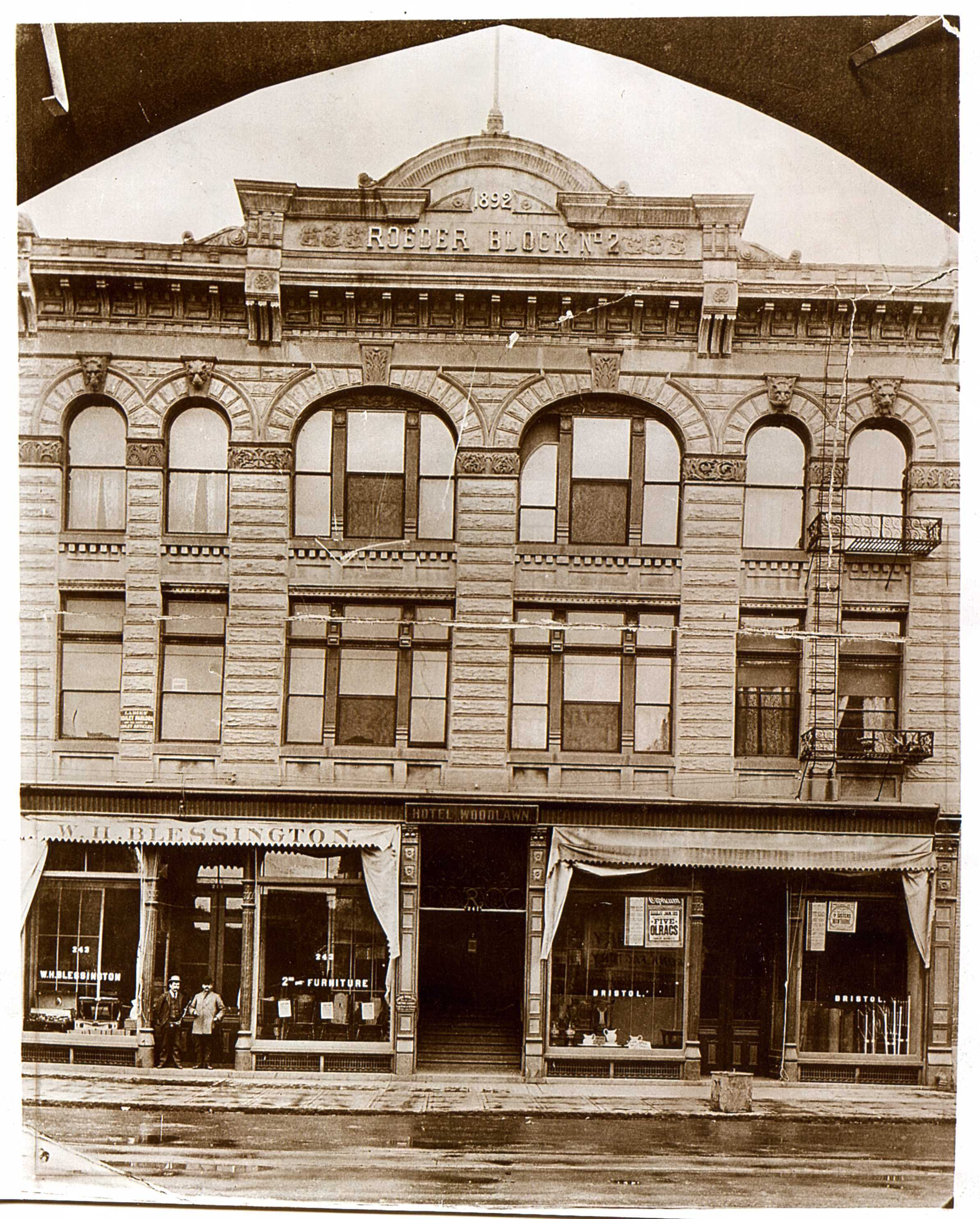
- Alternative names: Roeder Block No. 2

General information
- Status: Demolished
- Type: Commercial
- Architectural style: Late 19th-century commercial
- Location: Adjacent Spring Street, Los Angeles, United States
- Owner: Louis Roeder

Technical details
- Floor count: 2

Roeder Block II was constructed following the success of the first and reflected Roeder's ambition for larger-scale commercial development. The lot on which it was built measured 150 by 100 feet at the corner of First and Spring Streets, property Roeder had accumulated during the years following the sale of his wagon-manufacturing business in 1885. Though similar in function to Roeder Block I, it incorporated updated design trends and a broader layout aligned with the evolving commercial identity of Downtown Los Angeles in the late 1880s.

== Architectural significance ==
The Roeder Blocks exemplify Louis Roeder's transformation from tradesman to real estate developer. Having arrived in Los Angeles in 1856 and worked his way from a salaried wagon-maker's employee to independent businessman, Roeder was among the early German immigrant entrepreneurs who shaped the built environment of the city's commercial core. These structures highlight the role of individual entrepreneurs in shaping the built environment of early Los Angeles. Newmark, who knew Roeder personally, described the Spring Street site as emblematic of the city's rapid commercial transformation during the 1860s and 1870s.

== Legacy ==
Although both blocks have been demolished, they are preserved in photographs and archives. Their history contributes to ongoing research into the architectural and commercial development of Los Angeles in the 19th century.
