= Bella Union Hotel =

Historic site in Los Angeles, California

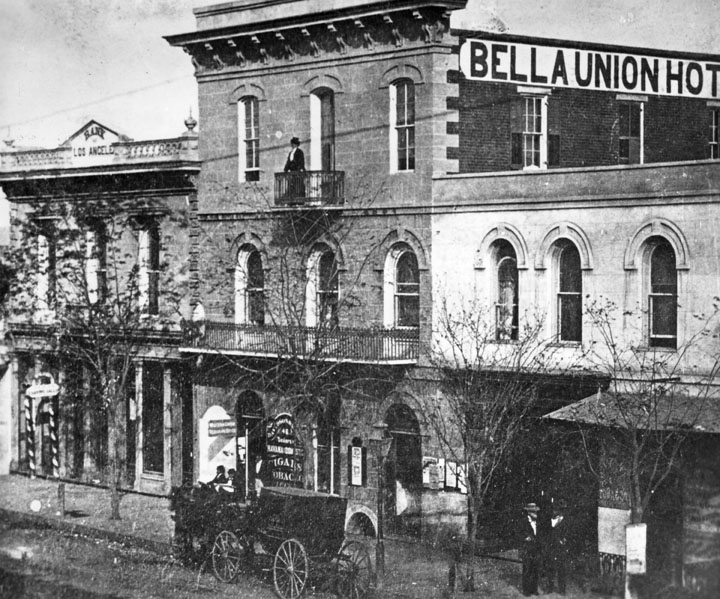
- Circa 1873 view of the Bella Union Hotel

- Location within the Los Angeles metropolitan area
- 34°3′15.09″N 118°14′28.33″W
- Location: East of Temple and Main streets, where Fletcher Bowron Square is today

History
- Built: 1835; 191 years ago
- Demolished: 1940; 86 years ago

Site notes
- Architect(s): William Wolfskill, Joseph Paulding and Richard Laughlin

California Historical Landmark
- Reference no.: 656

The Bella Union Hotel in Los Angeles, California, constructed in 1835, is California Historical Landmark No. 656. It was effectively the last capitol building of Mexican California under Governor Pio Pico, in 1845–47, and was a center of social and political life for decades. The hotel was located at N. Main Street, on the east side, a few doors north of Commercial Street, which then ran east–west between Arcadia and Temple. The hotel was later known as the Clarendon and then as the St. Charles.

== History ==
The building was thought to exist very close to the original site of Yaanga, a prominent Tongva (or Kizh) village.

The one-story adobe structure was built in 1835 by "three American trappers" — William Wolfskill, Joseph Paulding and Richard Laughlin — as a home for Isaac Williams, a New England merchant who had arrived in Los Angeles in 1832.

The single-story adobe became the last capitol of Mexican Alta California when Governor Pío Pico bought it and used it as his office.

After Los Angeles was conquered and occupied by American troops in 1847, the building was used by Lt. Archibald H. Gillespie, commander of the occupying forces, for whom it later served as a barracks. After that, the building became a saloon.

By early 1850, the building was operating as the Bella Union Hotel. Later that year, it became Los Angeles County's first courthouse.

Beginning in 1858, it was the region's transportation hub. The Overland Mail Company operated by John Butterfield (the founder of American Express) rented space for a station until it built new quarters in 1860 at Second and Spring—the present location of Mirror Building. The Wells, Fargo and Company also had their office here and Phineas Banning operated coaches to Wilmington and San Bernardino from the hotel.

A second floor was added to the hotel in 1851, and a third in 1869.

In 1873 the hotel was renamed the Clarendon Hotel. What had previously been the Shepard cigar and fancy store and had also served as Western Union headquarters in the city, was refitted to serve as a lounge, with reading and chess tables, and a dozen antique Elizabethan chairs from the California Theater in San Francisco. A separate stairway was built to connect the upper floors to the dining room, for ladies' use only. The new dining room accommodated 100 guests. Charles Rosseau, formerly of the Union Club in San Francisco, served as chef. The bar room was carpeted with Brussels tapestry. A building at the back with 16 rooms was connected to the main hotel of 62 rooms, and the hotel thus stretched the entire length of Commercial Street from Main to Los Angeles streets. The rooms, halls, and other facilities were newly outfitted. In early 1875, the hotel started advertising as the St. Charles.

== Recollections ==
In 1851, when Horace Bell, the author of the seminal historical work Reminiscences of a Ranger, first came to Los Angeles, the hotel was owned by James Brown Winston, a medical doctor, and Alpheus P. Hodges, the city's mayor. Bell's book, published in 1881, recounted how the hotel looked when he had stayed there thirty years before:

The house was a one-story flat-roofed adobe, with a corral in the rear, extending to Los Angeles street, with the usual great Spanish portal, near which stood a little frame house, one room above and one below. The lower room had the sign "Imprenta" over the door fronting on Los Angeles street, which meant that the Star was published therein. The room upstairs was used as a dormitory for the printers and editors.
. . . On the north side . . . were numerous pigeon-holes, or dog-kennels. These were the rooms for the guests of the Bella Union. In rainy weather the primitive earthen floor was sometimes, and generally, rendered quite muddy the percolations from the roof above. . . . The rooms were not over 6x9 [feet] in size. Such were the ordinary dormitories of the hotel advertised as being the "best hotel south of San Francisco." If a very aristocratic guest came along, a great sacrifice was made in his favor, and he was permitted to sleep on the little billiard table. [In the bar] during that time were the most bandit, cut-throat looking set [of people] that the writer had ever set his youthful eyes upon. . . . all . . . had slung to their rear the never-failing pair of Colt's, generally with the accompaniment of the bowie knife.

Louis Roeder, later a member of the Los Angeles Common Council, who stayed at the Bella Union in 1856, recalled in 1903 that the Bella Union had been

a one-story building, with a dining-room at the rear of the bar, roofed with canvas. Adjoining was a drug store, kept by Dr. [John Strother] Griffin and Dr. Miller. Then came the private residence of Mr. [Abel] Stearns, of the Stearns ranchos, a large adobe building, between which and the Plaza were a lot of shacks, occupied by Mexicans.

== Notable occasions ==
- When Pio Pico was confirmed by the Mexican government as the governor of California in 1845, he moved the territory's capital from Monterey, California, to Los Angeles, "as he always desired," and set up his headquarters in the Isaac Williams house. Later, the Bella Union was built upon this site.
- After the conquest of California by American forces in 1847, the building was used by Lieutenant Archibald Gillespie, who commanded the U.S. troops. After they left, it became a saloon.
- By early 1850, the building was operating as the Bella Union Hotel, and on June 24 of that year, it became the county's first courthouse, until October 1851 or until 1852.
- In 1850–51, when Alpheus P. Hodges was mayor and the co-owner of the Bella Union:

a funny thing happened. Some leaders perpetrated a hoax on his honor. They raided the hotel[,] where Hodges gave them free whiskey. That night they carried on sham attacks till morning against a supposed foe. They men had made their plans carefully and carried them out so realistically that, according to Horace Bell, they completely hoodwinked the mayor, who actually thought the pueblo was being attacked by a mob of rebels.

- In 1853, Obed Macy was owner of the hotel, and he was assisted by his son, Oscar Macy, later a member of the Los Angeles County Board of Supervisors.
- On October 7, 1858, the first Butterfield Overland Mail stagecoach from the East, arrived 21 days after leaving St. Louis, Missouri. "Warren Hall was the driver, and Waterman Ormsby, a reporter, the only through passenger. In that era it was the region's transportation hub: Wells, Fargo & Co. and Phineas Banning's coaches to and from Wilmington and San Bernardino had offices there."
- The hotel hosted a champagne celebration marking the first telegraph transmission between San Francisco and Los Angeles in 1860.
- At the outbreak of the Civil War in 1861, the Bella Union had become such a rendezvous for supporters of the Southern Confederacy that Union soldiers, primarily volunteers in training at the Drum Barracks in San Pedro, were forbidden to enter" it.
- On April 28, 1861, Albert Sidney Johnston, just resigned from the U.S. Army as commander of the Department of the Pacific, arrived at the Bella Union from San Francisco on his way to join the Confederate forces.
- Henry Hammel was proprietor of the Bella Union In 1862 or 1863. In 1864, Hammel sold his interest in the hotel and went to Kern County, where there was a gold rush. He and Andrew H. Denker located in Havilah in that county and built a hotel there, naming it, again, the Bella Union.
- On July 5, 1865, a fashionable wedding party was held at the hotel to honor merchant Solomon Lazard and his bride, Caroline Newmark, the daughter of Joseph Newmark, who established the Los Angeles Hebrew Benevolent Society and the city's first Jewish cemetery. At the party, Robert Carlisle, owner of the 46,000-acre Chino Ranch, became engaged in a quarrel with Undersheriff Andrew King: Carlisle slashed the lawman across a hand and his stomach with a Bowie knife. He also threatened to kill "any and all" of King's brothers. The next day, two of King's brothers entered the hotel in search of Carlisle, a gunfight ensued, and at the end Carlisle was fatally wounded and one of the King brothers, Frank, was dead. Carlisle's funeral was held in the Bella Union. Another King brother, Houston, was charged with murdering Carlisle; he was acquitted in 1866. It was, a Los Angeles Times reporter wrote many years later, "the most spectacular shooting affray in the history of Los Angeles."
- In 1868, the hotel became the home of Robert Maclay Widney, known as the "father of the University of Southern California," and his bride until their new residence was built. One day, Widney, who was a teetotaller, showed his marksmanship to a pair of drunks by putting three bullets from his Colt revolver through a knot of wood on the wall that the others had been unable to hit.
- Learning that the hotel was to be remodeled and the "last of the adobe" to be removed, some 80 "prominent citizens gathered for a farewell banquet on June 30, 1870." At that time John King was the proprietor; he died in 1871.
- The improvements were done in 1873, and the hotel's name was changed to the Clarendon.
- Finally, in 1875, the hotel became the St. Charles, a "low price lodging house, serving an increasingly poor and diverse population."
- The first talk over a telephone wire in Los Angeles took place in April 1877, when a U.S. Signal Corps lieutenant strung 200 feet of wire from the St. Charles across the street to the Lafayette Hotel. A local newspaper said of the event;

The talking-machine demonstration over Main St. yesterday was a success. The contraption is quite a toy and very interesting. It is a question yet with the most conservative thinking whether it can ever be put to practical use.

- The structure was demolished in 1940 and the site turned into a parking lot.

== California Historical Landmark ==
California Historical Landmark Marker No. 656 at the site reads:

- NO. 656 BELLA UNION HOTEL SITE - Near this spot stood the Bella Union Hotel, long a social and political center. Here, on October 7, 1858, the first Butterfield Overland Mail stage from the east arrived 21 days after leaving St. Louis. Warren Hall was the driver, and Waterman Ormsby, a reporter, the only through passenger.
