= Joseph Young (artist) =

American artist

- Born: 27 November 1919; Pittsburgh, Pennsylvania
- Died: 23 August 2007 (aged 87); Los Angeles, California
- Occupation: Artist
- Notable work: Triforium (Los Angeles)

Joseph Young (1919–2007) was an artist well known for his public artwork, which included mosaic murals, stained glass windows, monuments and public sculptures in granite, concrete, and bronze. Over the course of his career Young completed over sixty commissions for civic, church, synagogue and other public spaces, as well as privately collected works in oil, mosaic, ceramics and other media. His largest work is the mosaic West Apse of the Basilica of the National Shrine of the Immaculate Conception in Washington, D.C., entitled "The Woman Clothed With The Sun." Notable works in Los Angeles include the Holocaust Monument (Pan Pacific Park, Los Angeles), the mosaic bas-relief on the Richard Neutra-designed Los Angeles County Hall of Records, mosaic panels on the exterior of the UCLA Math Sciences Building, and the Triforium (Los Angeles). in Fletcher Bowron Square on the Los Angeles Mall at the Civic Center, Los Angeles.

== Biography ==
Joseph Louis Young was born Nov. 27, 1919, in Pittsburgh, Pennsylvania to parents Louis and Jenny (Eger) Young. Young was an only child and grew up in Aliquippa, Pennsylvania, where his parents owned the town's variety store. His father was a Ukrainian immigrant, and his mother, a Romanian immigrant. She was an artist and designer who encouraged her son in fine art as he demonstrated early talent.

Young attended the college preparatory boarding school Randolph-Macon Academy in West Virginia, and hoped to attend West Point but did not gain admission due to color blindness in one eye. He studied art, literature and journalism at Westminster College in New Wilmington, Pennsylvania, graduating in 1941. He moved to New York City when he got a job with United Press.

In World War II, he served in the Army Air Forces as a writer. After the war ended, Young studied art in New York, as well as at the Cranbrook Academy of Art in Michigan and the Boston Museum of Fine Arts.

== Career in Los Angeles ==
In 1952, Young and his wife moved to Pacific Palisades, Los Angeles after earning teaching fellowships from the Huntington Hartford Foundation. In 1955 Young was commissioned to create a mosaic mural, which he named "Theme Mural of Los Angeles", for the lobby of the Los Angeles Police Facilities Building (Parker Center) on Los Angeles Street. At least two dozen of Young's artworks can be seen across the city of Los Angeles. In June 2018, "Theme Mural" was removed from Parker Center in one piece, in advance of impending demolition of the shuttered police headquarters. As of May 2019 the mosaic remains in art preservation storage, pending determination of a new permanent home for the mural.

Young also created a mosaic topographical map of Los Angeles' water resources at the Richard Neutra-designed Los Angeles County Hall of Records, completed in 1962.

== Personal life and death ==
Young and his wife Millicent made Los Angeles their home from 1952 until their respective deaths. They had two daughters, Leslie, and Cecily. Late in life, Young developed Alzheimer's disease and in 2007 died from hospital-acquired pneumonia secondary to the disease. He and his wife are buried at Eden Memorial Park, North Hills, California, where he also designed a mosaic arch of The Twelve Tribes of Israel.
