= City Hall East =

City Hall East'may mean:

- City Hall East in Atlanta, now Ponce City Market
- City Hall East in Los Angeles, part of the Los Angeles Mall
