= Triforium (Los Angeles) =

Public artwork in Los Angeles, California

- Artist: Joseph Young
- Year: 1975
- Dimensions: 18 m (60 ft); 6.1 m diameter (20 ft)
- Location: Los Angeles; 34.054135°N 118.241129°W
- Owner: public

Triforium is a 60-foot high (18 m), concrete public art sculpture mounted with 1,494 Venetian glass prisms, light bulbs, and an internal 79-bell carillon located at Fletcher Bowron Square in the Los Angeles Mall at Temple and Main streets in the Civic Center district of Downtown Los Angeles.

== Background ==
The mall's architect Robert Stockwell commissioned artist Joseph Young to create the sculpture, and it was installed in 1975. Young's original plans called for a kinetic sculpture, which would use motion sensors and a computer controlled system to detect and translate the motions of passersby into patterns of light and sound displayed by the Venetian glass prisms and carillon.

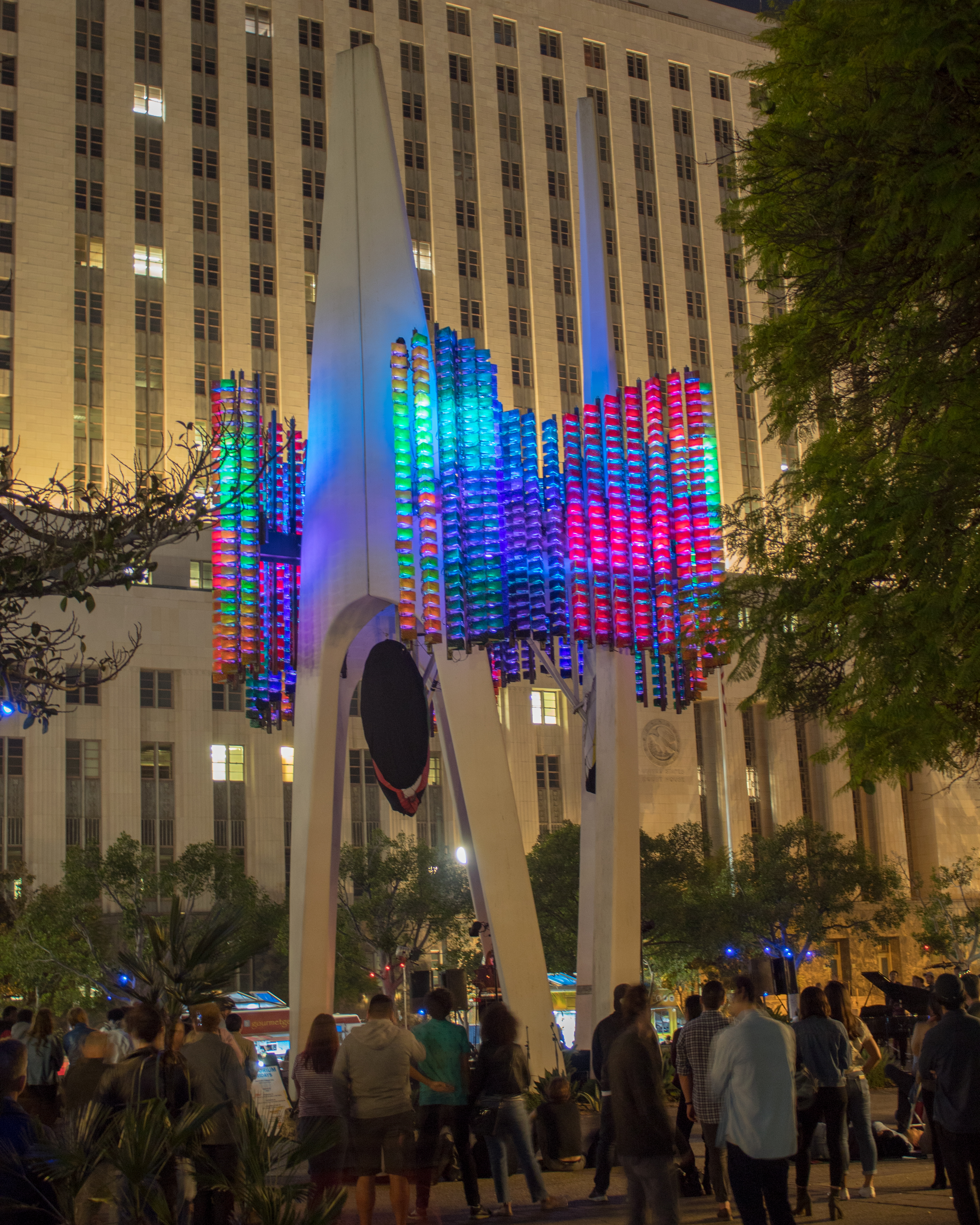
The sculpture during the second Triforium Fridays night

Young predicted that his public artwork would eventually become known as "the Rosetta Stone of art and technology" and boasted that it was the world's first "polyphonoptic" tower. He also said that Triforium was a tribute to the unfinished, kaleidoscopic nature of Los Angeles. In the original concept, Young intended the sculpture to project laser beams into space, which would have made it the world's first astronomical beacon. Budgetary restrictions, however, curtailed this design element. The initial cost of the sculpture was $925,000, and it was dedicated on December 12, 1975, although an electrical snafu delayed the musical portion's debut.

According to Michael Several, an authority on early public art projects in Los Angeles, the Triforium sculpture incorporated three two-legged concrete pillars, each supporting a bank of multicolored Venetian glass prisms (1,494 in all). The installation also originally included a custom-built Gerhard Finkenbeiner electronic 79-note glass-bell carillon with two octaves of English bells, and two octaves of Flemish bells, which were synchronized to lighting effects contained within the glass prisms. Meant to play "everything from Beethoven to the Bee Gees", the carillon was operated manually, or by computer, with the resulting sound played through the speaker system built into the Triforium. Unfortunately, the primitive computer originally installed in the structure to synchronize the lights and music was plagued with problems.

== History ==
The public art piece rests on the previous location of the Bella Union Hotel, which itself has been cited as a potential site of the village of Yaanga.

Unveiled with much fanfare at the opening of the Los Angeles Mall, the Triforium sculpture subsequently fell into disrepair and became the object of ridicule. Legend has it that a judge in the federal courthouse across the street claimed that the noise from the sculpture's sound system interfered with his trials and asked city officials to shut it down. Over the years, the sculpture suffered from a leaking reflection pool located at its base and pigeons often roosted in the structure. It was reputed to be "too expensive to fix, but too expensive to tear down." A December 14, 2006, Los Angeles Times article mentioned several nicknames that the sculpture has acquired over its lifetime: The Psychedelic Nickelodeon, Trifoolery, Three Wishbones in Search of a Turkey, Kitsch-22 of Kinetic Sculpture, and Joe's L.A. Space Launch.

In 2002, Joseph Young reflected on the state of disrepair that the sculpture had fallen into. "At times it was very lonely...When you do something that affects public tastes, you have to be armed to face the extremes of behavior."

Finally, after decades of inoperation, the lighting effects were restored and reactivated on December 13, 2006, following a $7,500 refurbishment. The sound synchronization computer was still due to be replaced when the lights and sound were turned back on. The sound currently heard from the Triforium speakers now originates from an external playback source and not the Finkenbeiner Triforium Carillon, which was disconnected and is now privately owned. In 2016, the sculpture received a further upgrade, paid for with $100,000 won in the LA2050 grant competition directed by the Goldhirsh Foundation. According to the Los Angeles Times, this latest upgrade did not restore the original reflecting pool because the water leaks into the Los Angeles Mall.

After two years of upgrades, a team of sound and light engineering firms created “The Triforium Project” to sponsor and produce live musical performances, (the latest in October and November 2018).
