= Obed Macy =

American physician and pioneer (1801–1857)

Member of the Los Angeles Common Council for the at-large ward
- In office January 5, 1855 – May 7, 1856

Personal details
- Born: December 14, 1801 Guilford County, North Carolina
- Died: July 19, 1857 (aged 55) Boyle Heights, Los Angeles
- Party: Republican
- Spouse: Lucinda Polk (m. 1824)
- Children: 13
- Parents: William Macy (father); Mary Barnard (mother)
- Occupation: Politician

Obed Macy (December 14, 1801 – July 19, 1857) was an American medical dictor and pioneer in Los Angeles County, California, arriving there by wagon train shortly after California became a part of the United States following the Mexican–American War. He and his son Oscar Macy were members of the Los Angeles Common Council, the governing body of that city, and operated one of Los Angeles's historic hotels.

== Personal life ==
Obed Macy was born December 14, 1801, in New Garden, Guilford County, North Carolina, the son of William Macy and Mary Barnard. He was married in 1824 to Lucinda Polk in Bruceville, Indiana, in which state he practiced medicine "for years." The family came to California with several others from Knox County, Indiana, in 1850 by wagon train pulled by oxen.

The family lost one child, Charles, on the nine-month journey who died of a cholera outbreak sweeping the wagon train. A later account noted that the Macys "suffered innumerable hardships and privations en route by the lack of water and feed for the teams, which nearly all perished thereby."

They arrived in San Francisco, but in 1851 they went to the site of El Monte, California, where they were the first American settlers; a year later they moved to Los Angeles.

Obed and Lucinda had a family of thirteen children, including a boy whom they named Obed and who later also became active in Los Angeles commerce, and another son, Oscar, noted below.

Obed Macy died on July 19, 1857.

== Vocation ==
Obed Macy was the first physician in the Los Angeles area., but he also opened a bathhouse called The Alameda and bought the Bella Union Hotel, which, according to an account written more than a century later:

was a magnet for the town's young blades and affluent business leaders. The hotel was one of the few places in Los Angeles with shade trees in front, where idlers would gather on warm afternoons to wait for the Banning stage from San Pedro with passengers and newspapers from the East.

== Public service ==
Obed Macy was elected to the Los Angeles Common Council in a special election on January 5, 1855, his term ending on May 9 of that year.

== Legacy ==
The former Macy Street in Downtown Los Angeles was named to mark the Macy family ranch, and when the city engineer suggested in 1920 that Macy Street and Brooklyn Avenue, which were "practically continuous," should bear the same name, a committee from the Native Sons of the Golden West appeared before the City Council to protest. Spokesman H.O. Lichtenberger said of Obed Macy:

He was a man of undaunted courage, for on [his] . . . perilous trip to the land of gold [in 1850] he faced the dangers of an unknown future, and when we think of him undertaking this journey and assuming the care and protection of a wife and nine children, we must concede that he was a hardy and brave pioneer, indeed.

On that occasion the plea was successful, and the Macy Street name was retained, but in May 1993 the City Council unanimously decided to change the name of a portion of Sunset Boulevard and all of Macy Street and Brooklyn Avenue to a new appellation—Cesar Chavez Avenue, in honor of the late labor leader. Nevertheless, a roadway and pedestrian bridge over the Los Angeles River is still often called the "Macy Street Viaduct."
