= Louis Lichtenberger =

American politician (1835–1892)

Member of the Los Angeles Common Council for the 2nd Ward
- In office December 18, 1874 – December 9, 1875

Los Angeles City Treasurer
- In office December 5, 1878 – December 11, 1880

Personal details
- Born: August 25, 1835 Ottweiler, Prussia
- Died: February 28, 1892 (aged 56) Los Angeles, California
- Resting place: Angelus Rosedale Cemetery; 34°02′32.5″N 118°17′54.9″W
- Party: Republican
- Spouse: Amelia Bohse (m. 1865–1892)
- Children: 4
- Occupation: Carriage and wagon maker; Businessman; Politician

Louis Lichtenberger (1835–1892) had a carriage and wagon-making shop in 19th-century Los Angeles, California, and became a wealthy landowner. He was city treasurer and a member of the Common Council, the governing body of the city.

== Personal ==
Lichtenberger was born August 25, 1835, in Otweiler, Prussia [sic], and immigrated to Chicago, Illinois, when he was sixteen. He remained in that city until 1860, when he settled in San Francisco, and he moved to Los Angeles in 1863. He was married to Amelia or Emilie Bohse of Bonn, Germany, on November 2, 1865. He died on February 28, 1892, in the family home at 124 East Fourth Street, leaving his widow and four children, with an estate of $194,780. He was fifty-six years old.

== Vocation ==
In Chicago, young Lichtenberger apprenticed in carriage and wagon-making and carried on this occupation in both San Francisco and Los Angeles. In L.A., he formed a partnership with Louis Roeder from 1866 to 1869. He retired in 1886, having invested in real estate. In 1891 he was vice-president of the German-American Savings Bank at 114 South Main Street, Los Angeles.

=== Public service ===
A Republican, Lichtenberger represented the 2nd Ward on the Los Angeles Common Council in 1874–75 and 1875–76; He was elected city treasurer and was the president of the Sixth District Agricultural Association for about ten years.
