= Cesar Chavez Avenue =

Street in Los Angeles

- Interactive map of Cesar Chavez Avenue
- Namesake: Cesar Chavez
- Length: 6.19 mi (9.96 km)
- Nearest metro station: Union Station
- West end: Figueroa Street / Sunset Boulevard in Downtown
- East end: Atlantic Boulevard / Riggin Street in Monterey Park

Construction
- Inauguration: 1994

Cesar Chavez Avenue (Spanish: Avenida César Chávez) is a major east–west thoroughfare in Downtown Los Angeles, the east Los Angeles (region) and East Los Angeles, measuring 6.19 miles (9.96 km) in length. Named in honor of union leader César Chávez, the street was formed in 1994 from Sunset Boulevard between Figueroa and Main streets, a new portion of roadway, Macy Street between Main Street and Mission Road, and Brooklyn Avenue through Boyle Heights and East Los Angeles into Monterey Park.

== History ==
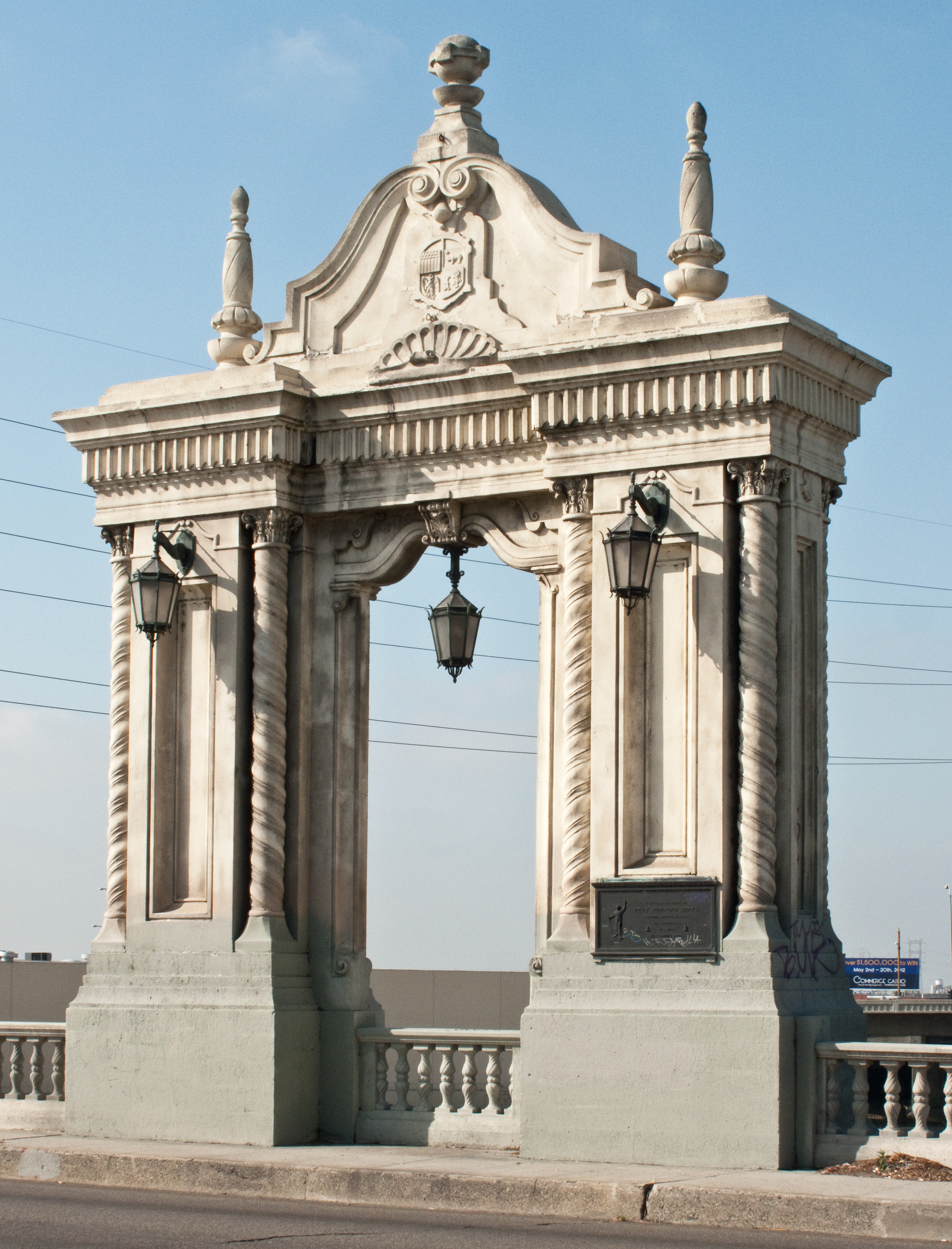
The historic Spanish Colonial Revival style Macy Street Viaduct.

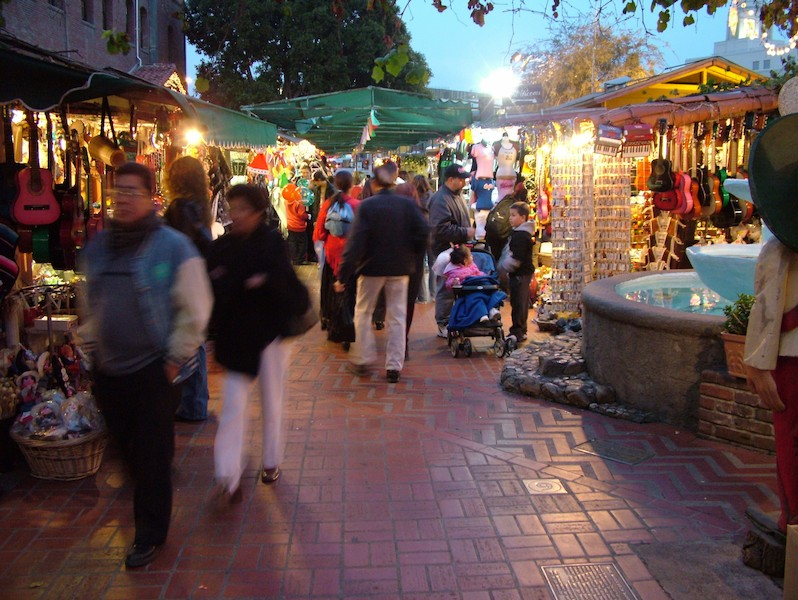
North entrance to Olvera Street from Cesar Chavez Avenue.

The street and viaduct were originally named for the family ranch of Los Angeles pioneers Obed Macy and Oscar Macy.

In October 1993, the Los Angeles City Council and the County Board of Supervisors approved the renaming of the stretch of roadway, but agreed to delay the change until 1994 and to put up historic plaques along Brooklyn Avenue to accommodate the opposition, many of whom believed that the new name would cause people to forget the Jewish history of the area.

A street sign unveiling ceremony was held on March 31, 1994, Chávez's birthday, at the five-points intersection at Indiana Street, along the border of Boyle Heights and the unincorporated area of East Los Angeles.

In March 2026, following sexual abuse allegations made against Chavez, local groups and residents have called for a name change to the roadway.

== Route ==
Part of the pre-1940 Route 66, Cesar Chavez Avenue begins as a continuation of Sunset Boulevard on the east side of Figueroa Street. It runs through Downtown Los Angeles, crosses Alameda Street and passes over the Los Angeles River, through the neighborhoods of Brooklyn Heights and Boyle Heights and the northern portion of East Los Angeles into the southern portion of Monterey Park.

The roadway becomes Riggin Street when it crosses Atlantic Boulevard in Monterey Park.

== Transportation ==
- Union Station, which provides connections to the A, B, and D lines, as well as Metrolink and Amtrak.
- Metro Local line 70 runs through Cesar Chavez Avenue.

== Notable landmarks ==
- Sunset Boulevard
- Pueblo de Los Angeles
- Olvera Street
- Terminal Annex
- Union Station
- Evergreen Cemetery
- East Los Angeles Civic Center
- East Los Angeles College
- Cesar Chavez Avenue Viaduct
