= Fletcher Bowron Square =

Square in Los Angeles, California, U.S.

Coordinates: 34°3′15″N 118°14′28″W

- Public square
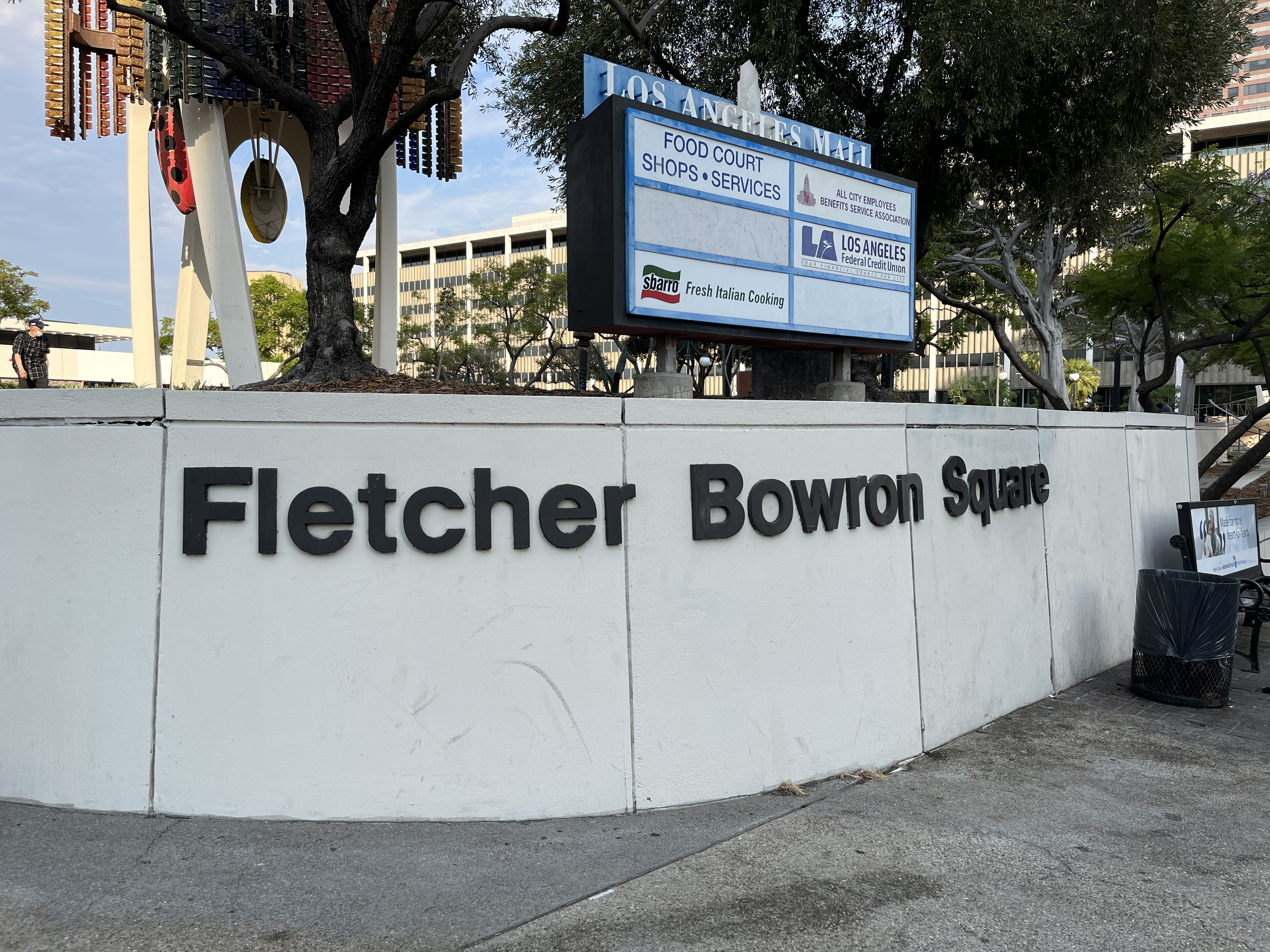
- Plaza signage, 2022
- Features: Triforium
- Completed: 1975
- Dedicated to: Fletcher Bowron
- Location: Los Angeles, California
- Address: 302 N Main Street
- Interactive map of Fletcher Bowron Square

Fletcher Bowron Square is a public square in Los Angeles, in the U.S. state of California. The plaza is named after former mayor Fletcher Bowron and was dedicated in his honor in 1975. The sculpture Triforium is installed in the square.

In 2017, the open space served as the end point for thousands of demonstrators who supported the impeachment of U.S. President Donald Trump.
