= Louis Roeder =

American politician, businessman, and real estate developer

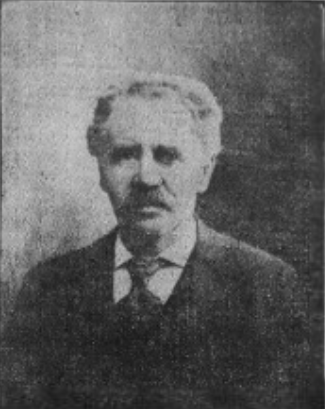
- Louis Roeder circa late 1800s

Member of the Los Angeles Common Council
- In office May 10, 1866 – May 8, 1867
- Preceded by: Elijah H. Workman
- Succeeded by: John Schumacher

Personal details
- Born: January 28, 1835 Darmstadt, Germany
- Died: February 20, 1918 (aged 83) Los Angeles, California
- Resting place: Los Angeles Odd Fellows Cemetery; 34°01′28.9″N 118°11′43.5″W
- Spouse: Wilhelmine Huth (m. 1863–1918)
- Children: Charles Roeder; Louis Roeder Jr.; Henry Roeder; Elizabeth "Lizzie" Adams Roeder; Maria Roeder; Maria Roeder; Caroline "Carrie" Roeder; Wilhalmine R. Joughin; Louis Roeder
- Occupation: Blacksmith; carriage maker; landowner; politician

Louis Roeder (January 28, 1835 – February 20, 1918) was a prominent German-American blacksmith, businessman, and politician who played a significant role in shaping early Los Angeles. Known for his pioneering efforts in land development and his term on the Los Angeles Common Council, Roeder's legacy extends across various aspects of the city's growth, particularly in the fields of real estate and civic leadership.

== Early life and career ==
Born in Darmstadt, Germany, in 1835, Roeder emigrated to New York City in 1851, at the age of 15. He lived in New York City for six years before hearing "wonderful stories of California." Though not interested in the California Gold Rush, Roeder decided to make the journey west. He traveled via the Isthmus of Panama and arrived in San Francisco, then made his way south to San Pedro aboard the steamship *Senator*.

After arriving in Los Angeles, he stayed briefly at the Bella Union Hotel near the Los Angeles Plaza, one of the city's most well-known establishments at the time.

== Early Vocation ==
Roeder initially worked as a blacksmith and later became involved in various other industries. He contributed to the city's growth by helping to repair the water system, and worked for a local wagon-maker. Eventually, he became partial owner of the business, using his stake to acquire property in Los Angeles. This marked the beginning of his interests in land acquisition and development.

== Real Estate Development ==
Roeder's most notable contributions to Los Angeles stemmed from his investments in the city's real estate. In an era when Los Angeles was still a small, struggling city, he was one of the few who saw the potential for future growth. Roeder's acquisition of land in downtown Los Angeles, including the construction of the Roeder Block, helped define the early business district.

The Roeder Blocks, completed in 1874, was a significant commercial development that established Roeder as a key player in Los Angeles' real estate scene. The property marked one of the city's first large-scale investments and played a pivotal role in encouraging further development in the area.

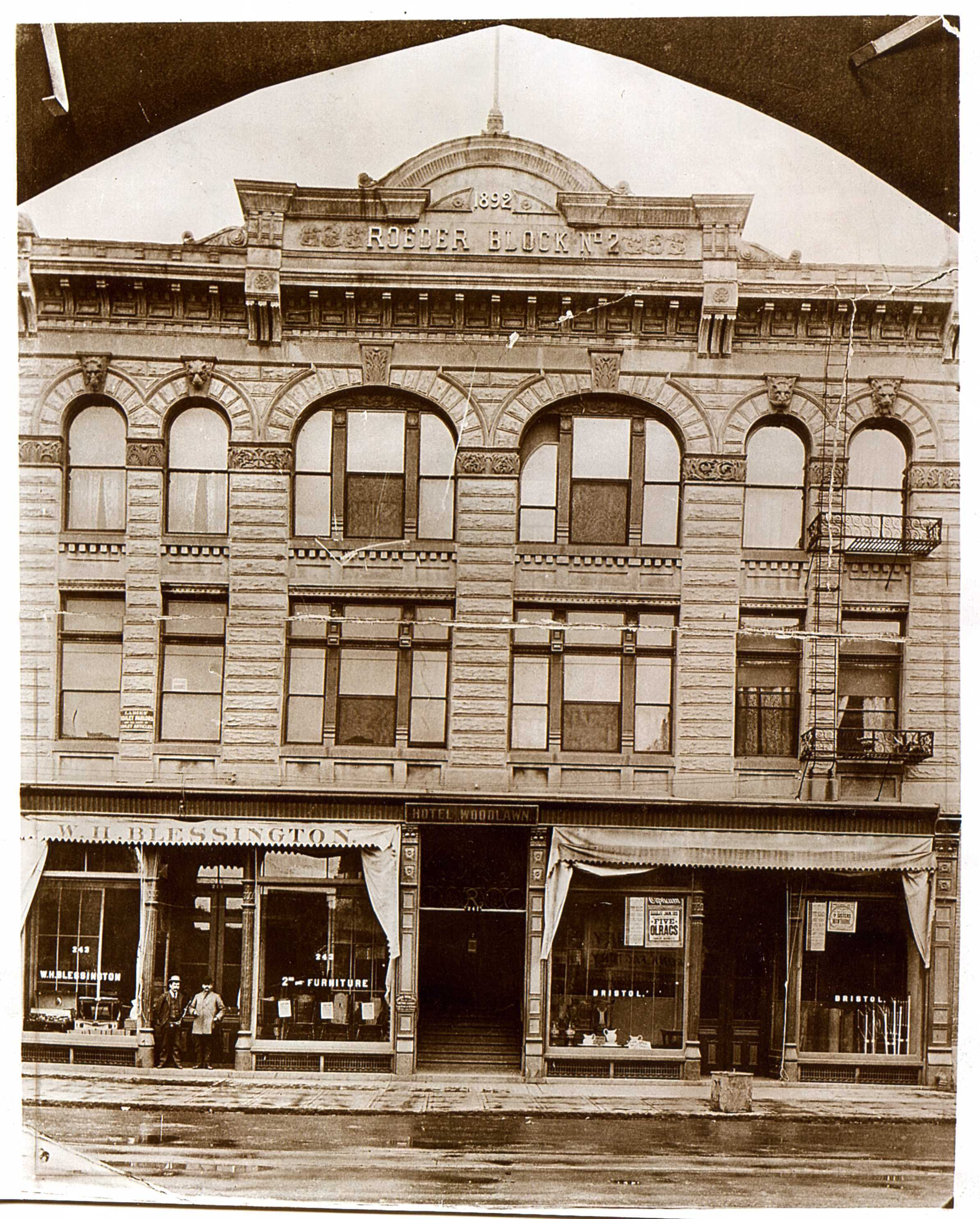
The Roeder Block, a key development by Louis Roeder in downtown Los Angeles.

== Political career ==
Roeder served as a member of the Los Angeles Common Council, the city's governing body, from May 10, 1866, to June 23, 1870. During his tenure, he worked to promote the development of infrastructure, including public utilities and services, to accommodate the city's expanding population. His role in the council highlighted his commitment to improving the quality of life in Los Angeles during its formative years.

== Legacy ==
Louis Roeder's life is emblematic of the immigrant success story in 19th-century California. His contributions to the city of Los Angeles, both in terms of real estate and politics, helped lay the groundwork for the city's rapid growth in the late 19th and early 20th centuries. Though little remains of his commercial developments today, Roeder's impact on Los Angeles continues to be felt through his pioneering efforts in urban planning and land development.
