= Oscar Macy =

American politician, publisher and pioneer (1829–1910)

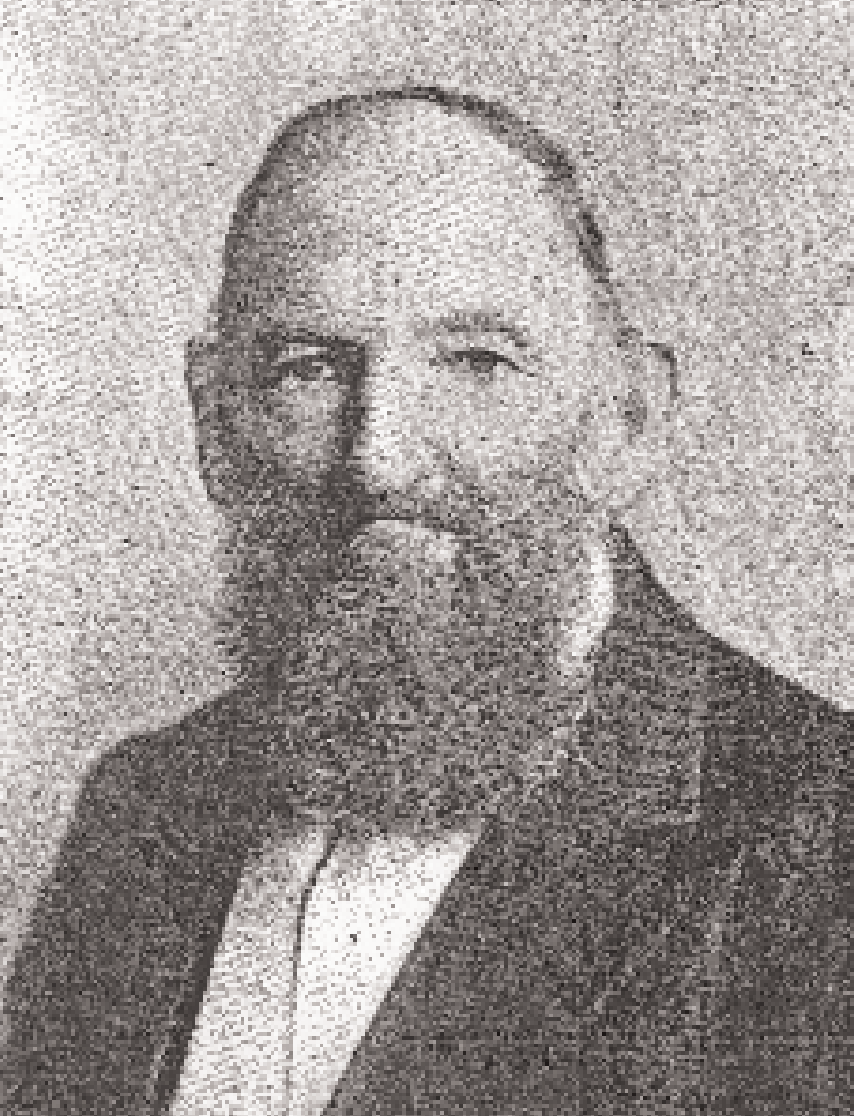
- Macy in the late 1880s

Chair of Los Angeles County
- In office December 1, 1885 – December 6, 1887
- Preceded by: Charles Prager
- Succeeded by: Joseph W. Venable

Member of the Los Angeles Common Council from the 1st ward
- In office December 11, 1871 – December 5, 1872

Member of the Los Angeles County Board of Supervisors for the 2nd district
- In office January 3, 1885 – 1889

Personal details
- Born: July 28, 1829 Knox County, Indiana
- Died: November 1, 1910 (aged 81) Boyle Heights, Los Angeles
- Party: Republican
- Occupation: Politician

Oscar Macy (July 28, 1829 – November 1, 1910) was an American politician, newspaper publisher, and pioneer in Los Angeles County, California. The son of Obed Macy, he was served on the Los Angeles Common Council, served as a county sheriff, and served on the Los Angeles County Board of Supervisors. He and his father operated one of Los Angeles's historic hotels.

== Personal life ==
Macy was born July 28, 1829, at Maria Creek in Knox County, Indiana, and died at the age of 81 on November 1, 1910, in his residence at 519 Plymouth Street in Boyle Heights (Now part of North Cummings Street). leaving four children, Oscar A. Macy, Estelle and Alice Macy and Irene Macy Whitney, as well as siblings Obed Macy and Lucinda M. Foy. The cause was noted as "an attack of bronchial asthma. He was predeceased by his wife, Margaret Elizabeth Bell, whom he had married on August 24, 1873, in Los Angeles: She died October 28, 1891, at the age of 42.

== Vocation ==
Macy had no formal schooling, but was tutored by his father. Soon after the settlers' party arrived in California, Oscar went with a brother-in-law, David W. Chessman, to Condemned Bar in Yuba County to work a gold mine. The venture was unsuccessful, so Macy went to Sacramento to work as a printer on the Alta California. He next worked for his father at the Bella Union Hotel, and in the late 1850s he was the foreman of the print shop of the Southern Vineyard newspaper published by J.J. Warner.

In the early 1870s, Macy had a fifty percent share of a herd of ten thousand sheep on Catalina Island, and at the same time he worked on the Los Angeles Star, a newspaper published in both Spanish and English. He left the newspaper while serving as city treasurer (below) but returned in 1888 and remained a journalist until retiring in June 1903.

== Public service ==
Macy represented the 1st Ward on the Los Angeles Common Council in 1871–72. It was during this term when the city opened the street west of Alameda Street where the Macys had their home and property eastward to the Los Angeles River and named it Macy Street.

Macy, a Republican, was elected to the Los Angeles County Board of Supervisors in November 1884 and was seated on January 3, 1885. During his term, a new county jail was built (later demolished to make way for the present Hall of Records. He was Los Angeles city treasurer from 1886 to 1888. Sheriff John C. Cline appointed him as Los Angeles county jailer from 1892 to 1894, when he resigned.

== Legacy ==
The former Macy Street in Downtown Los Angeles was named to mark the Macy family ranch, and when the city engineer suggested in 1920 that Macy Street and Brooklyn Avenue, which were "practically continuous," should bear the same name, a committee from the Native Sons of the Golden West appeared before the City Council to protest. On that occasion the plea was successful, and the Macy Street name was retained, but in May 1993 the City Council unanimously decided to change the name of a portion of Sunset Boulevard and all of Macy Street and Brooklyn Avenue to a new appellation—Cesar Chavez Avenue, in honor of the late labor leader. Nevertheless, a roadway and pedestrian bridge over the Los Angeles River is still often called the "Macy Street Viaduct."
