= Los Angeles Mall =

Shopping center and public plaza complex in Los Angeles, California

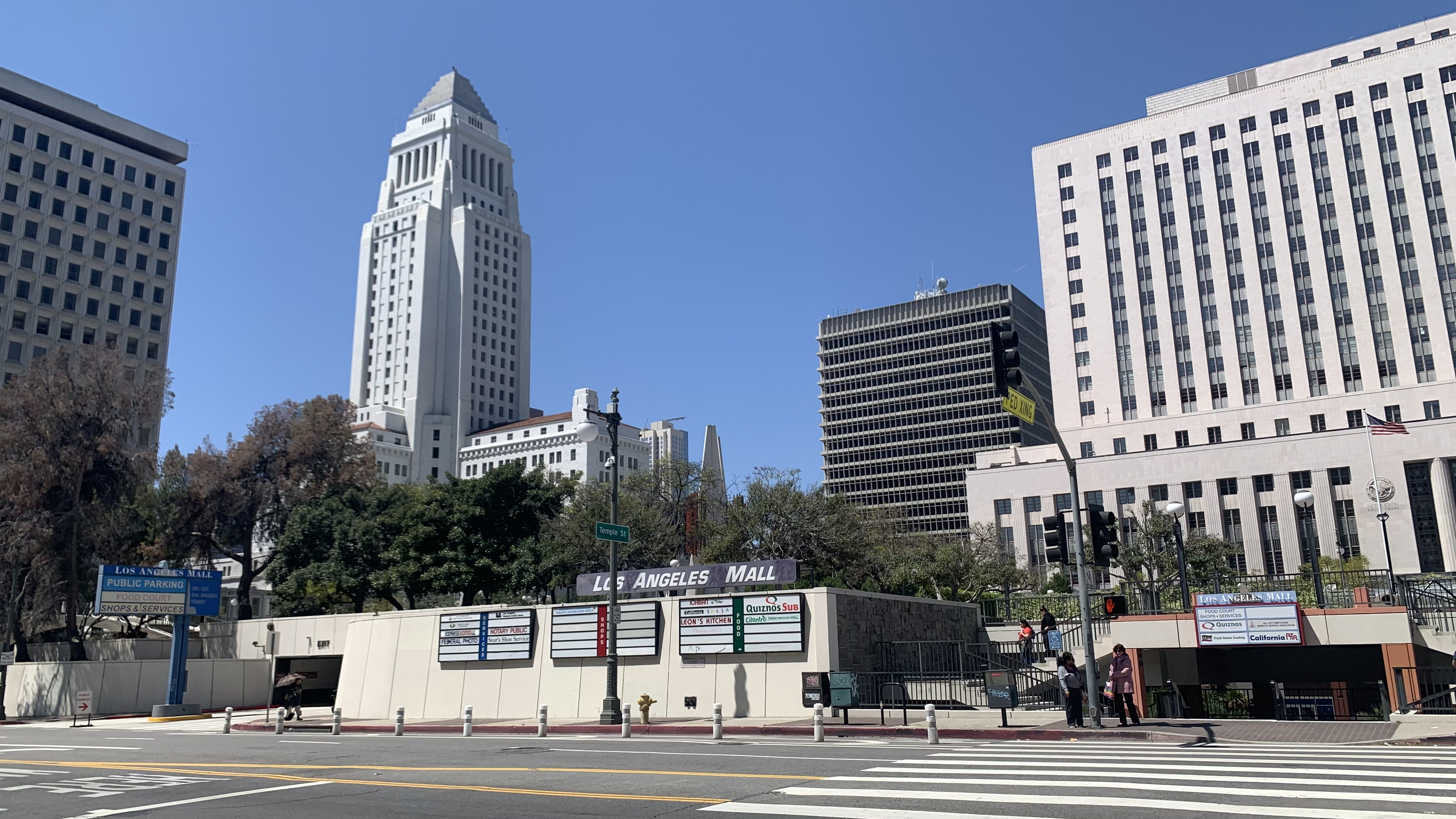
- Los Angeles Mall in 2022
- Location: Los Angeles, California, United States
- Coordinates: 34.0544°N 118.2408°W
- Address: 300 North Main Street
- Opened: 1974

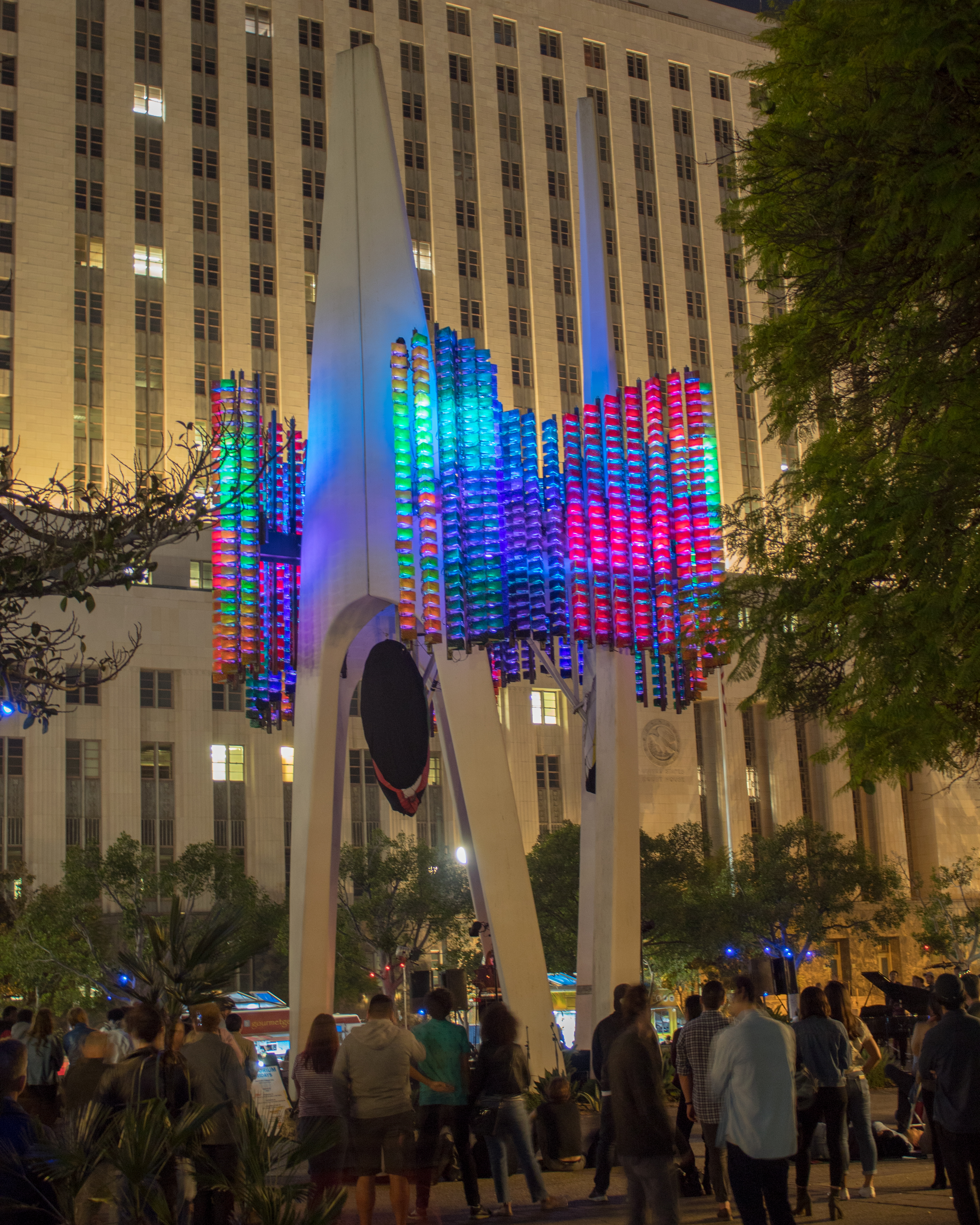
Triforium sculpture

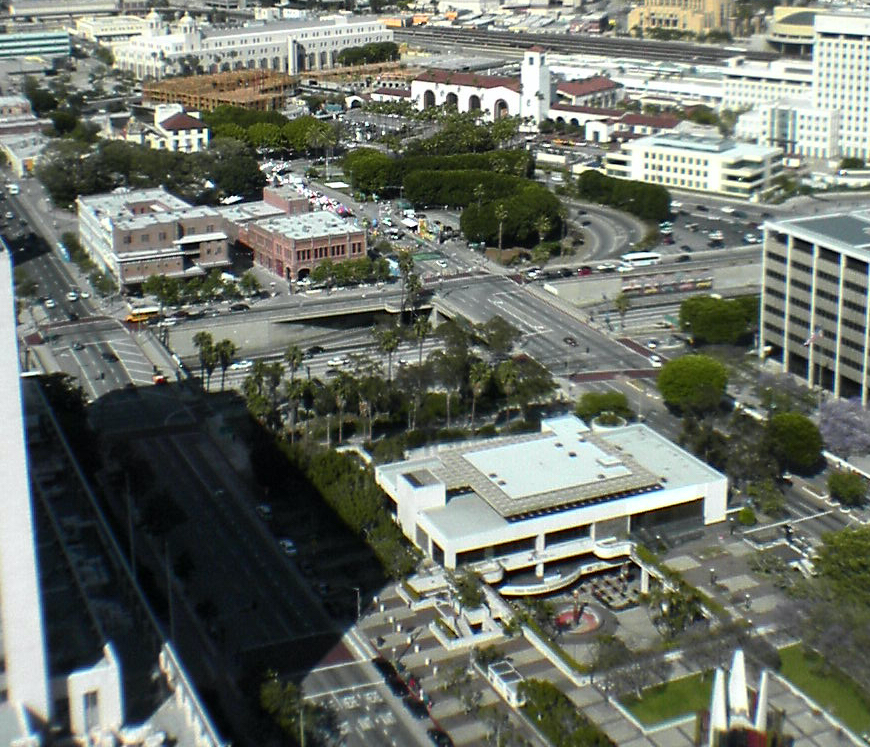
2005 view of the Los Angeles Plaza (brick buildings at top left), Union Station (top right) and the north plaza of the Los Angeles Mall (bottom center)

The Los Angeles Mall is a small shopping center and series of plazas (public squares) at the Los Angeles Civic Center, between Main and Los Angeles Streets on the north and south sides of Temple Street, connected by both a pedestrian bridge and a tunnel. It features Joseph Young's sculpture Triforium, a colorful sculpture unveiled in 1975, which has 1,500 blown-glass prisms synchronized to an electronic glass bell carillon. The mall opened in 1974 and includes a four-level parking garage with 2,400 spaces. It stands on the site of what once was some of the oldest commercial blocks in the city that was demolished in the 1940s and 1950s.

The mall was designed by the architectural firm Stanton & Stockwell, which also designed the Los Angeles County Courthouse and Kenneth Hahn L.A. County Hall of Administration. It was conceived as a "town square" for meetings, retail, public institutions, and public art, serving the general public and the tens of thousands of government employees working at the Civic Center's municipal, state, and federal buildings. Cornell, Bridgers, Troller and Hazlett were the landscape designers.

== Plan to demolish ==
The site is large to be demolished, along with the new “Los Angeles Street Civic Building” (LASCB) on the site of the demolished Parker Center, as part of a larger project to diversify, revitalize and reconnect the district.

== Plazas ==
The plazas are primarily paved and lined with city government buildings. In and around the plazas are grass lawns and planters of flowering shrubs, and specimen trees.

The South Mall surrounds City Hall East, an 18-story, Brutalist, 1972 building also by Stanton & Stockwell, featuring a mural by Millard Sheets, The Family of Man. Around the edges are a mix of tall deciduous trees. Here is the Howard Troller and Hanns Scharff's 1974 Eleanor Chambers Memorial Fountain (nicknamed Dan-de-lion). Also here are two Chinese lions celebrating the 200th Anniversary of the signing of United States Declaration of Independence. The Sunken Palm Court has paths that arc out; located here is Jan Peter Stern's 1974 stainless steel sculpture Cubed Square.

The North Mall's plaza is elevated and enclosed by mature jacaranda trees. This is the location of Triforium. Another plaza, this one sunken, at the base of the former Children’s Museum includes a food court, stands of palm, and the Robert J. Stevenson Fountain, which is in the form of a pointed obelisk, red and brown in color, placed in a pool with jets of water in a centrifugal form.

== Bridge ==
Howard Troller, the Mall's landscape architect, designed a pedestrian bridge over Temple Street to connect the North and South malls, and for aesthetics, included a taper like a ship's keel into the bottom of the bridge, and asked artist Tom Van Sant to contribute further; Van Sant designed curving steps up from the street as well as the handrails on the bridge. The arc of the bridge over Temple Street was increased in order to include the steps. The bridge cantilevers out from the sidewalk toward the middle of the street. A rubber filler connects the two sections and allows them to move during an earthquake. This small bridge was a forerunner of other Los Angeles public art that is both aesthetic and functional.

== Tenants ==
Besides City Hall East and the Children's Museum, tenants in 1981 included 15 shops including Sav-on Drug Stores, 9 services including Security Pacific National Bank, and 9 food outlets including Bob's Jr. by Bob's Big Boy and a Carl's Jr. As of 2022, most of the mall is now occupied by services and offices, along with a few food outlets, which include Cilantro Fresh Mexican Grill and Quiznos.

== Decline ==
By the mid-1980s, the mall was already considered, due to lack of maintenance, an "embarrassment" and there was discussion whether the Children's Museum should take over the entire mall. The Children's Museum moved to another location around 2000. Many homeless people appear to be living in the space, and plans from 2018 included one to convert the space to housing for those currently homeless. In the late 2010s the homeless population increased in the area, causing a decrease in the use of public areas by the general population.
