= Los Angeles Central Business District =

Los Angeles Central Business District may refer to:

- Central Business District, Los Angeles (1880-1899)
- Downtown Los Angeles - Central Business District, present day
