= El Pueblo de Los Ángeles Historical Monument =

- Los Angeles Plaza Historic District
- U.S. National Register of Historic Places
- U.S. Historic district
- Los Angeles Historic-Cultural Monument
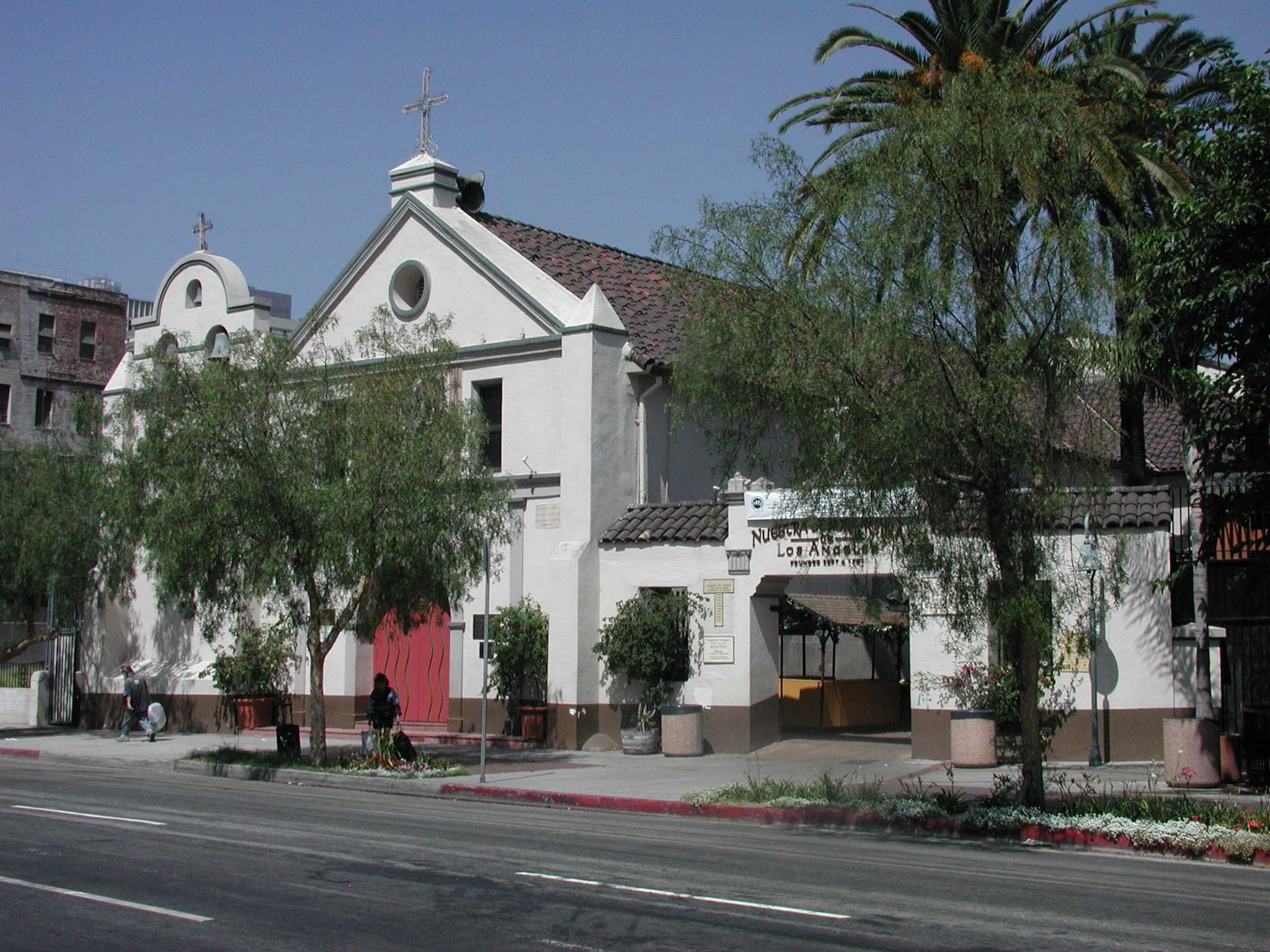
- La Placita Church

- Location within Los Angeles
- Location: Los Angeles, California
- Coordinates: 34°3′25″N 118°14′16″W
- NRHP reference No.: 72000231
- LAHCM No.: 64

Significant dates
- Added to NRHP: November 3, 1972
- Designated LAHCM: April 1, 1970 (as 'Plaza Park')

El Pueblo de Los Ángeles Historical Monument, also known as Los Angeles Plaza Historic District and formerly known as El Pueblo de Los Ángeles State Historic Park, is a historic district taking in the oldest section of Los Angeles, known for many years as El Pueblo de Nuestra Señora la Reina de los Ángeles del Río de Porciúncula. The district, centered on the old plaza, was the city's center under Spanish (1781–1821), Mexican (1821–1847), and United States (after 1847) rule through most of the 19th century. The 44-acre park area was designated a state historic monument in 1953 and listed on the National Register of Historic Places in 1972.

== Historic images ==
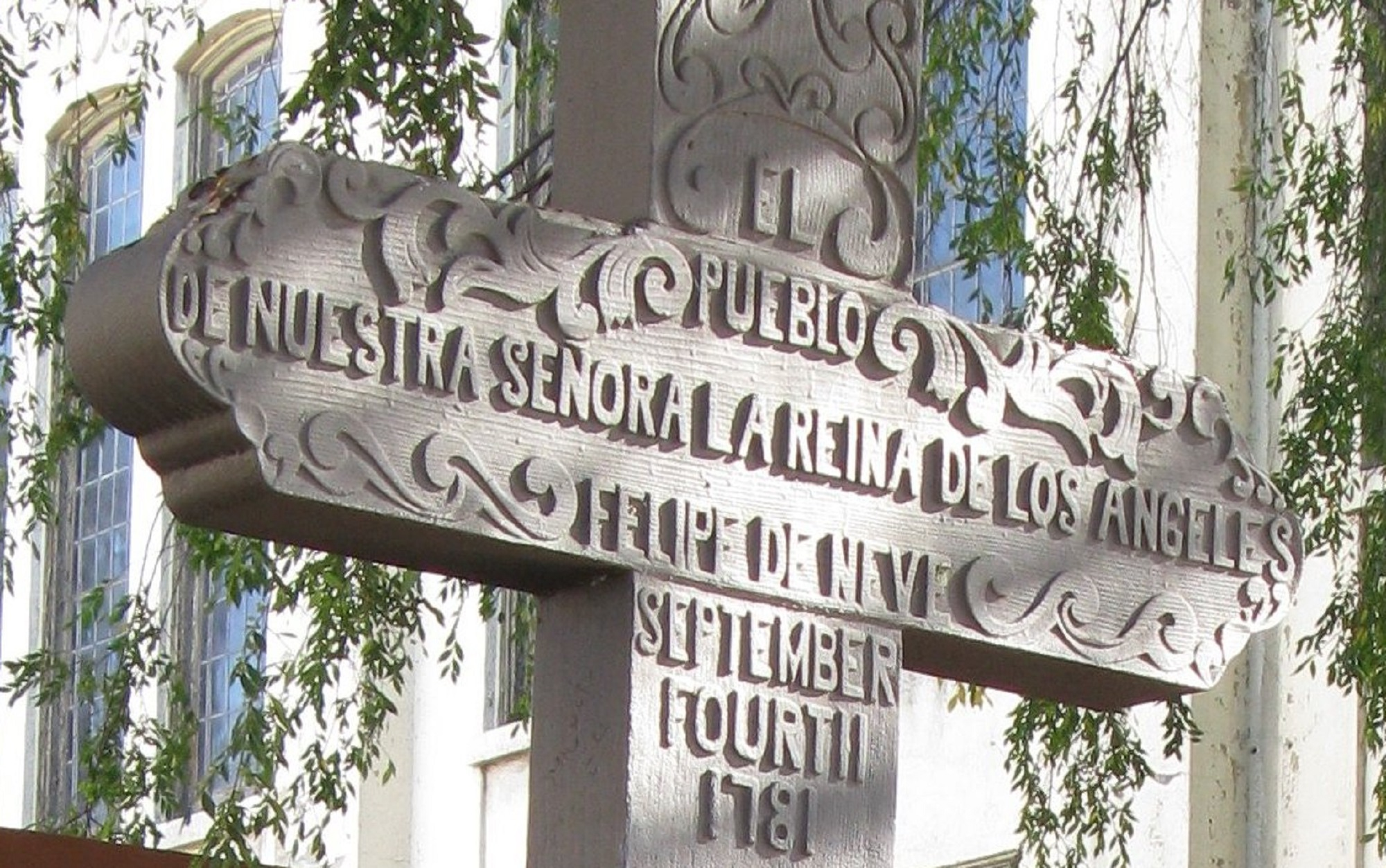
Inscription on historical marker "El Pueblo de Nuestra Señora La Reina de Los Ángeles - Felipe de Neve - September Fourth 1781"

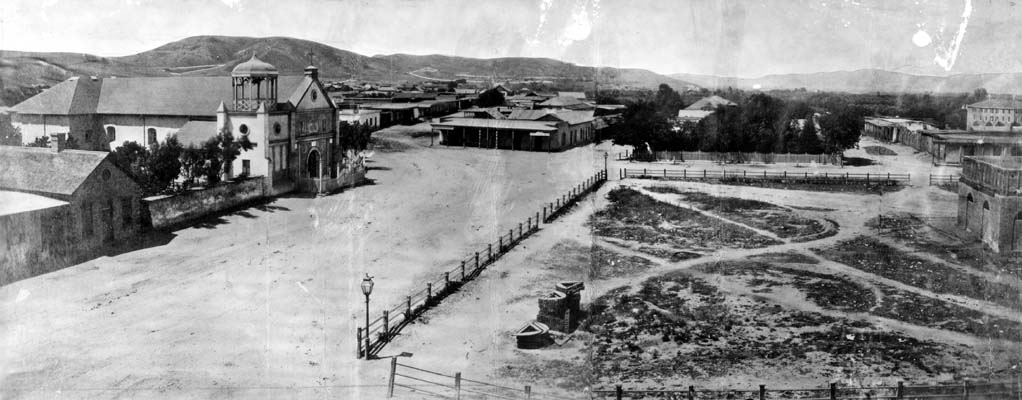
Plaza in 1869

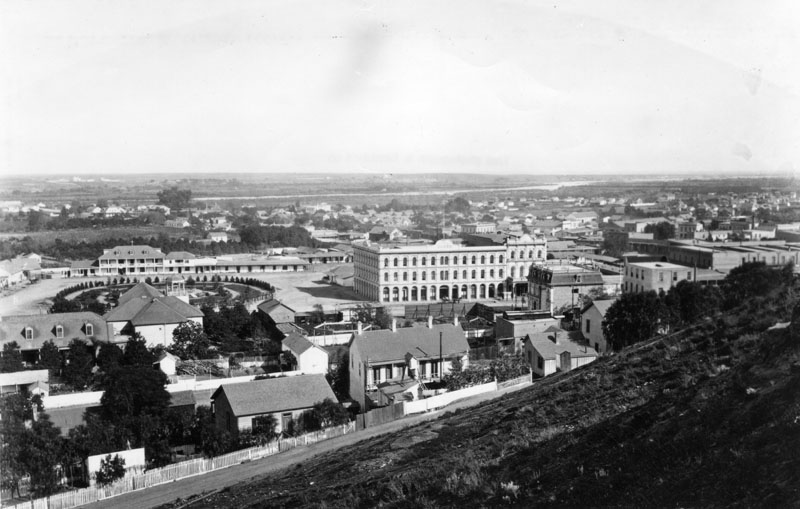
Los Angeles Plaza (1876)

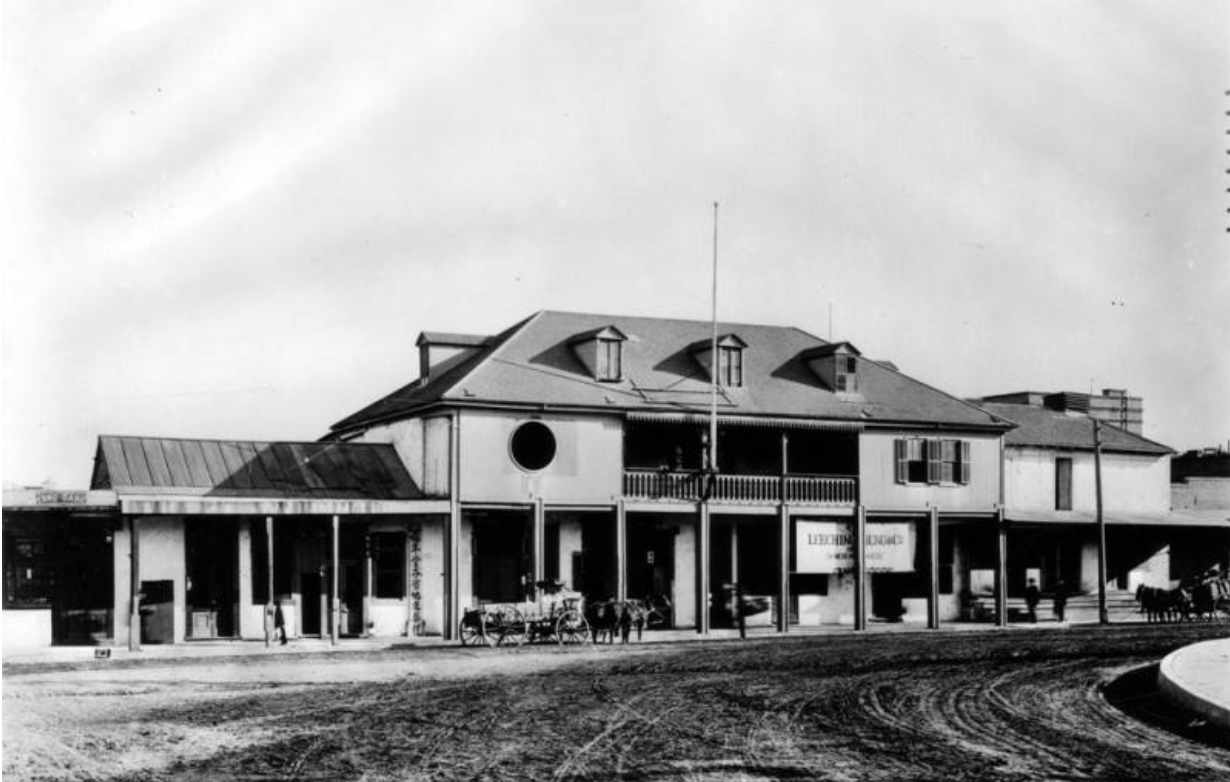
The Lugo Adobe (built 1840s, demolished 1950s) long anchored the east side of the Plaza

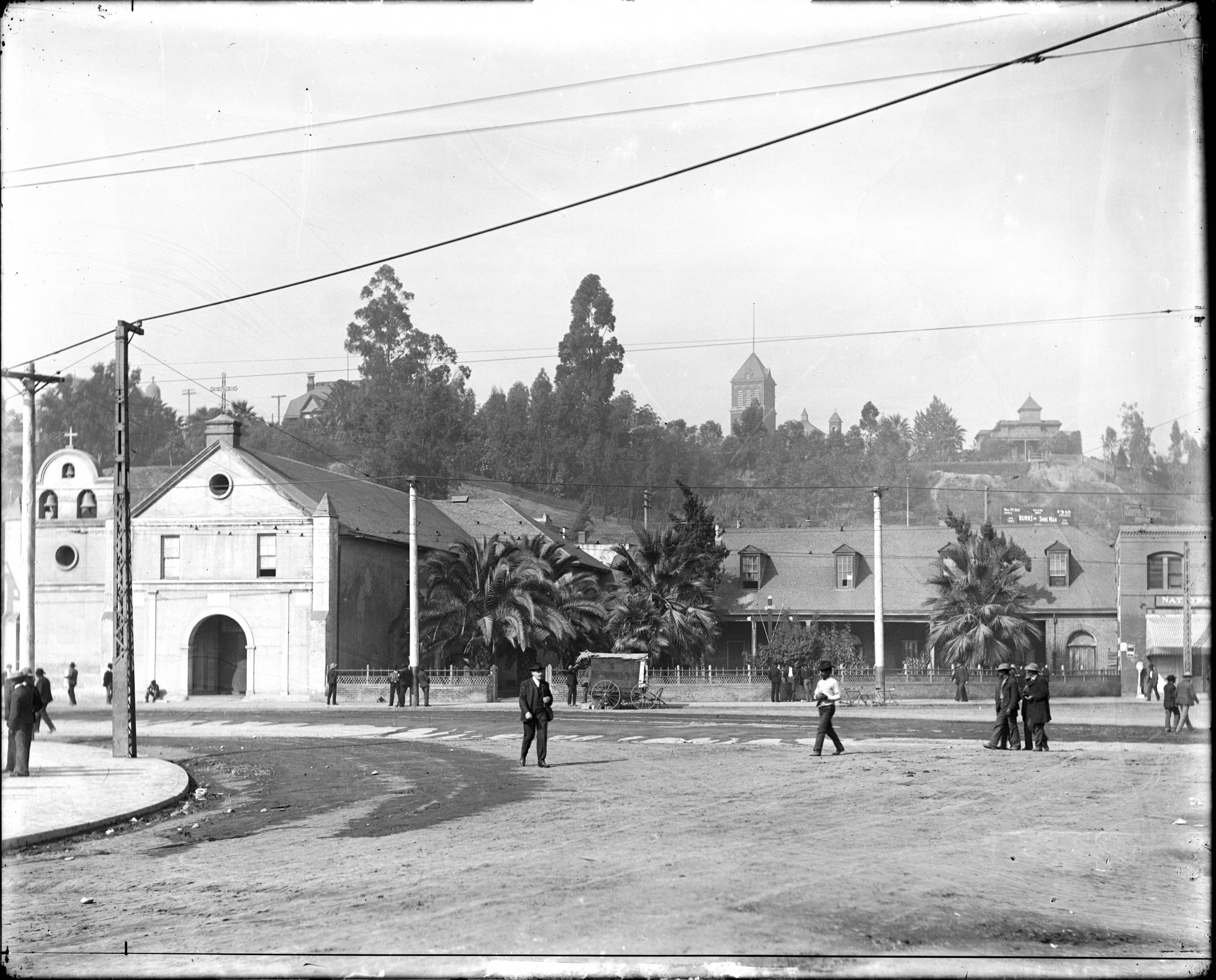
Los Angeles Plaza (c. 1905)

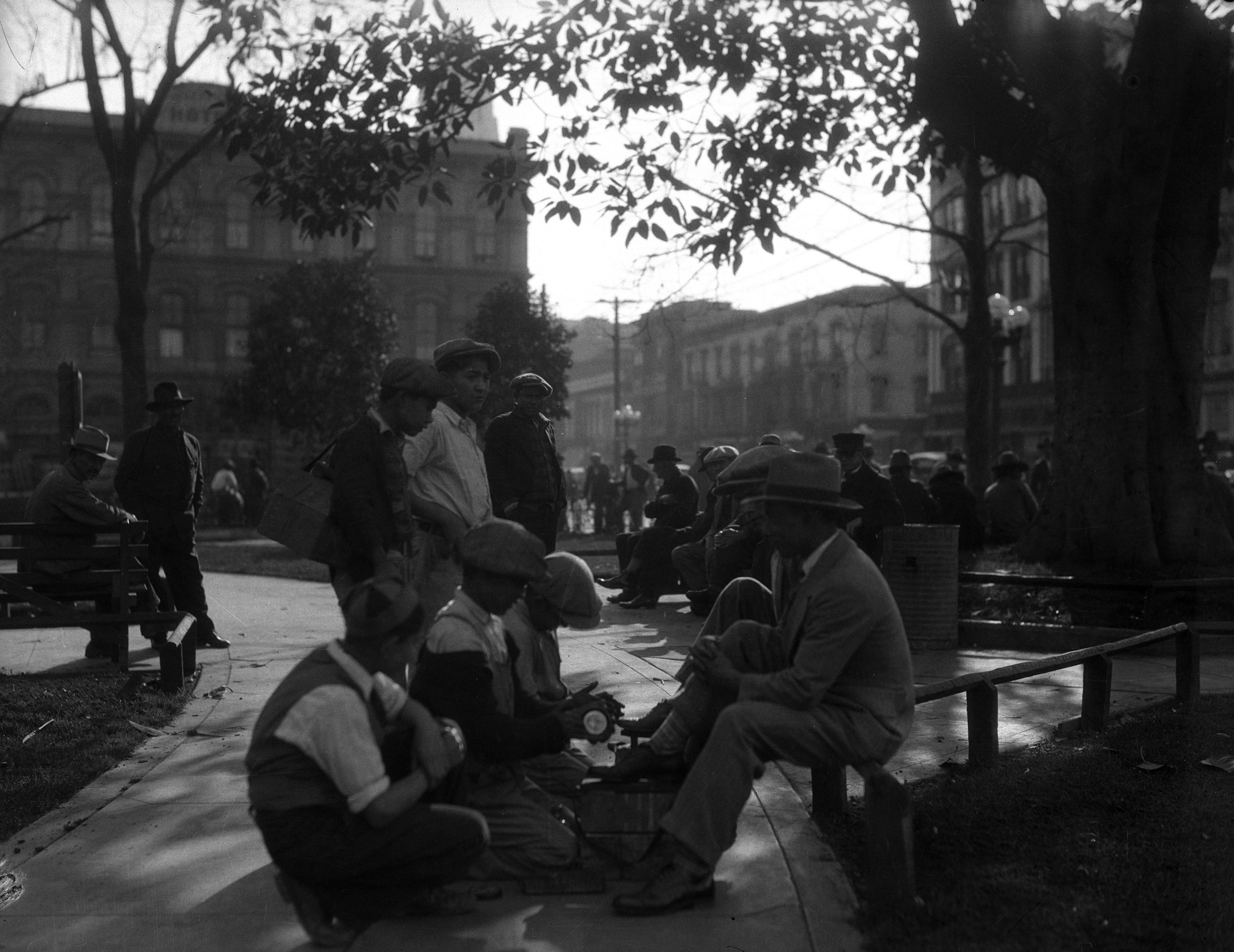
The Old Plaza around 1930

== History ==
=== Founding of the Pueblo ===
A plaque across from the Old Plaza commemorates the founding of the city. It states: "On September 4, 1781, eleven families of pobladores (44 persons including children) arrived at this place from the Gulf of California to establish a pueblo which was to become the City of Los Angeles.

At least ten (and up to 26) of the 44 were Black.

Spain also settled the California region with a number of African and mulatto Catholics, including at least ten (and up to 26) of the recently re-discovered Los Pobladores, the 44 founders of Los Angeles in 1781.

This colonization ordered by King Carlos III was carried out under the direction of Governor Felipe de Neve." The small town received the name El Pueblo de Nuestra Señora Reina de los Ángeles sobre El Río Porciúncula, Spanish for The Town of Our Lady Queen of the Angels on the Porciúncula River.

The original pueblo was built to the southeast of the current plaza along the Los Angeles River and near the Tongva village of Yaanga. Excavations at the church site "recovered beads and other artifacts used during the period of mission recruitment." In 1815, a flood washed away the original pueblo, and it was rebuilt farther from the river at the location of the current plaza.

=== Growth of the Pueblo ===
During its first 70 years, the Pueblo grew slowly from 44 in 1781 to 1,615 in 1850—an average of about 25 persons per year. During this period, the Plaza Historic District was the Pueblo's commercial and social center.

In 1850, shortly after California became part of the United States, Los Angeles was incorporated as a city. It experienced a major boom in the 1880s and 1890s, as its population grew from 11,200 (1880) to 50,400 (1890) and 102,500 in 1900. As the City grew, the commercial and cultural center began to move south away from the Plaza, along Spring Street and Main Street.

In 1891, the Los Angeles Times reported on the shifting city center:

The geographical center of Los Angeles is the old plaza, but that has long since ceased to be the center of population. ... While at one time most of the population was north of the plaza, during the past ten years 90 per cent of the improvements have gone up in the southern half of the city. ... These are solid facts which it is useless to attempt to ignore by playing the ostrich acts and level-headed property holders in the northern part of the city are beginning to ask themselves seriously what is to be done to arrest or at least delay the steady march of the business section from the old to the new plaza on Sixth Street ...

== Preservation as a historic park ==
The 44 acres (180,000 m^{2}) surrounding the Plaza and constituting the old pueblo have been preserved as a historic park roughly bounded by Spring, Macy, Alameda and Arcadia streets, and Cesar Chavez Boulevard (formerly Sunset Boulevard). There is a visitors center in the Sepúlveda House. A volunteer organization known as Las Angelitas del Pueblo provides tours of the district.

The district includes the city's oldest historic structures clustered around the old plaza. The buildings of historical significance include Nuestra Señora La Reina de Los Ángeles Church (1822), Avila Adobe (1818) (the city's oldest surviving residence), the Olvera Street market, Pico House (1870), and the Old Plaza Fire Station (1884). Four of the buildings have been restored and are operated as museums.

In addition, archaeological excavations in the Pueblo have uncovered artifacts from the long indigenous period before European contact and colonization. These include animal bones, household goods, tools, bottles, and ceramics.

The district was designated as a state monument in 1953, and listed on the National Register of Historic Places in 1972. These steps, however, did not prevent the demolition, in the decades to come, of numerous historic and very old buildings, particularly those that once formed the eastern edge of the Plaza.

== Contemporary images ==
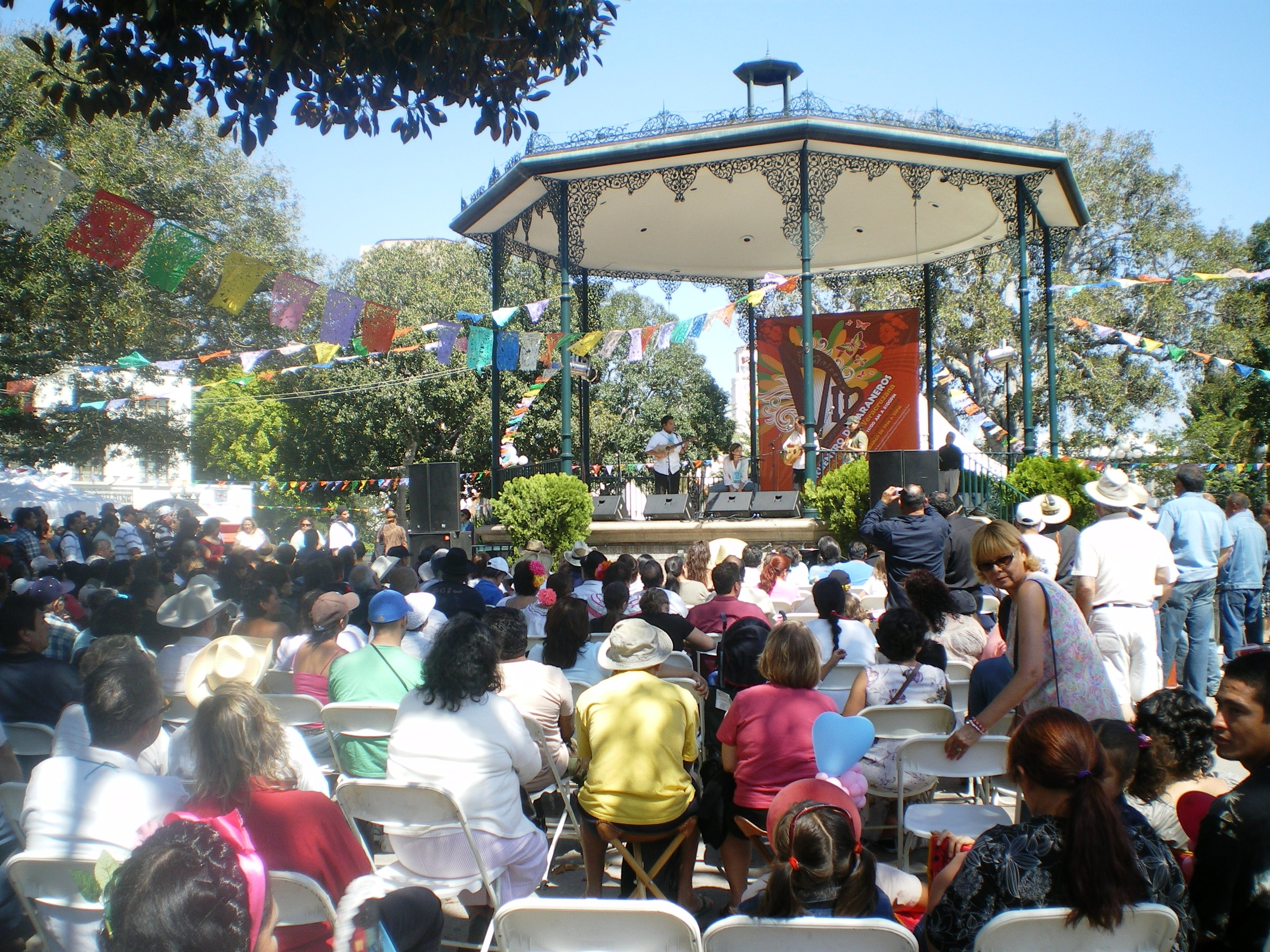
Musicians performing at the Plaza

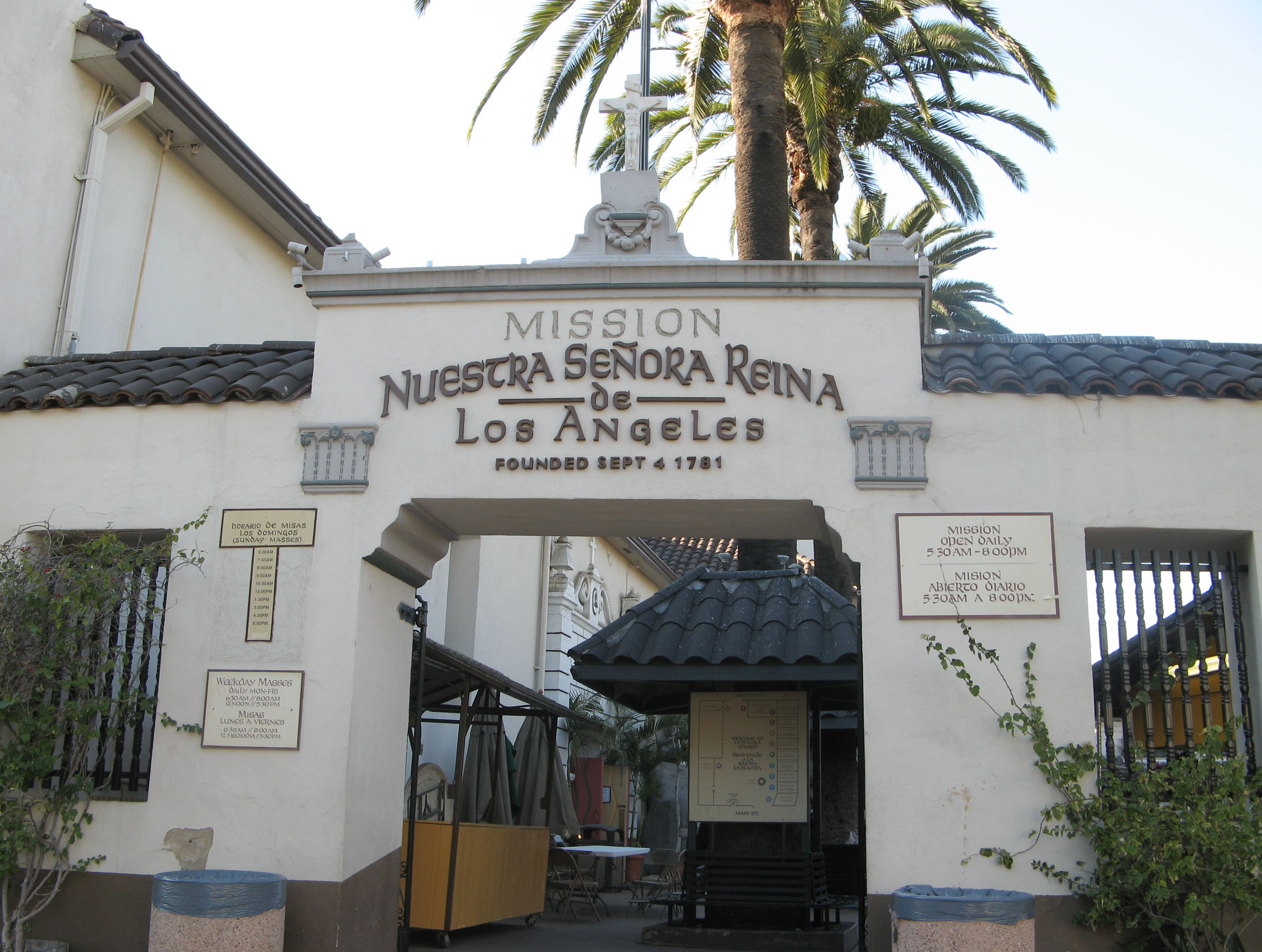
Plaza Church in early 2007.

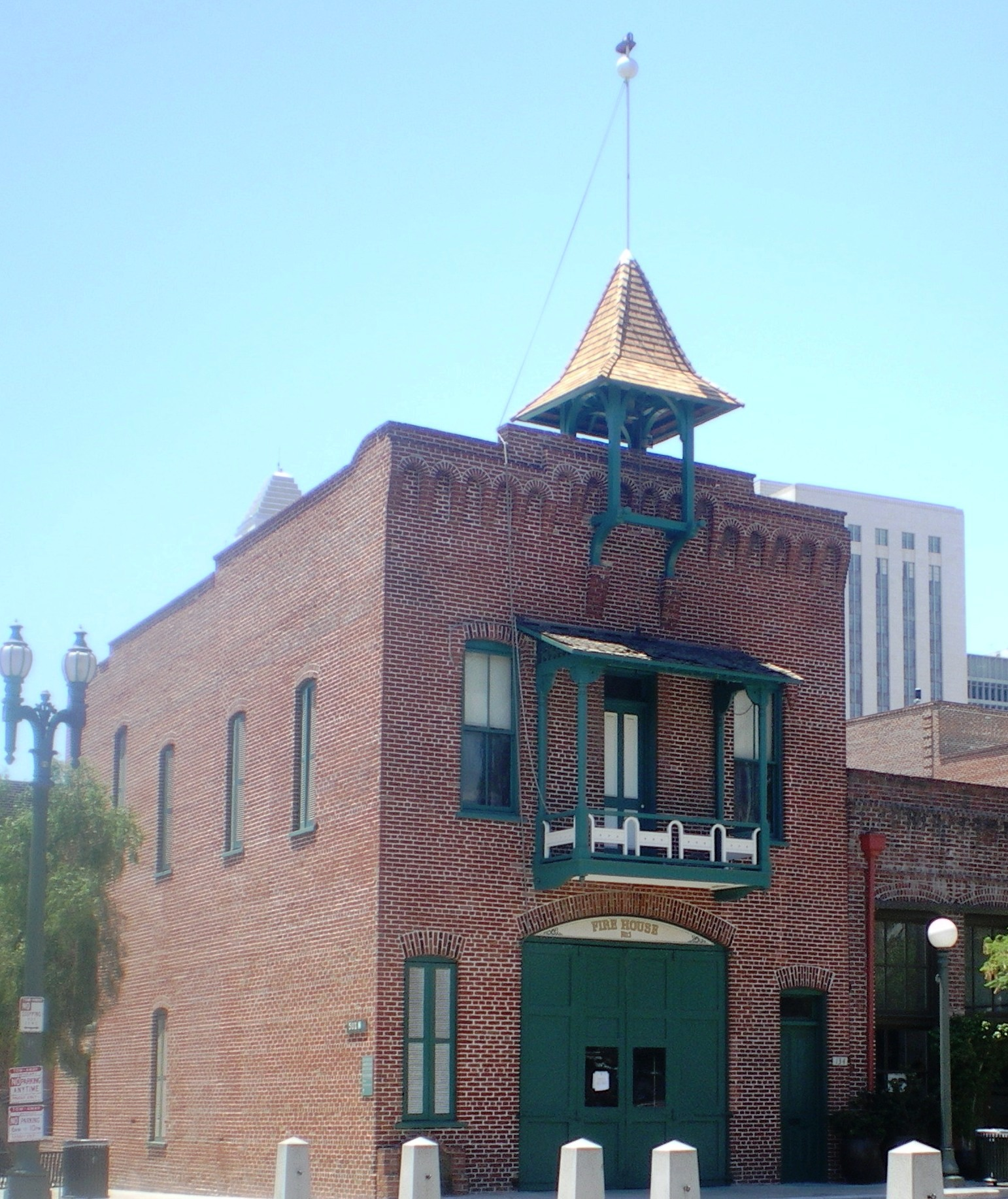
Old Plaza Firehouse

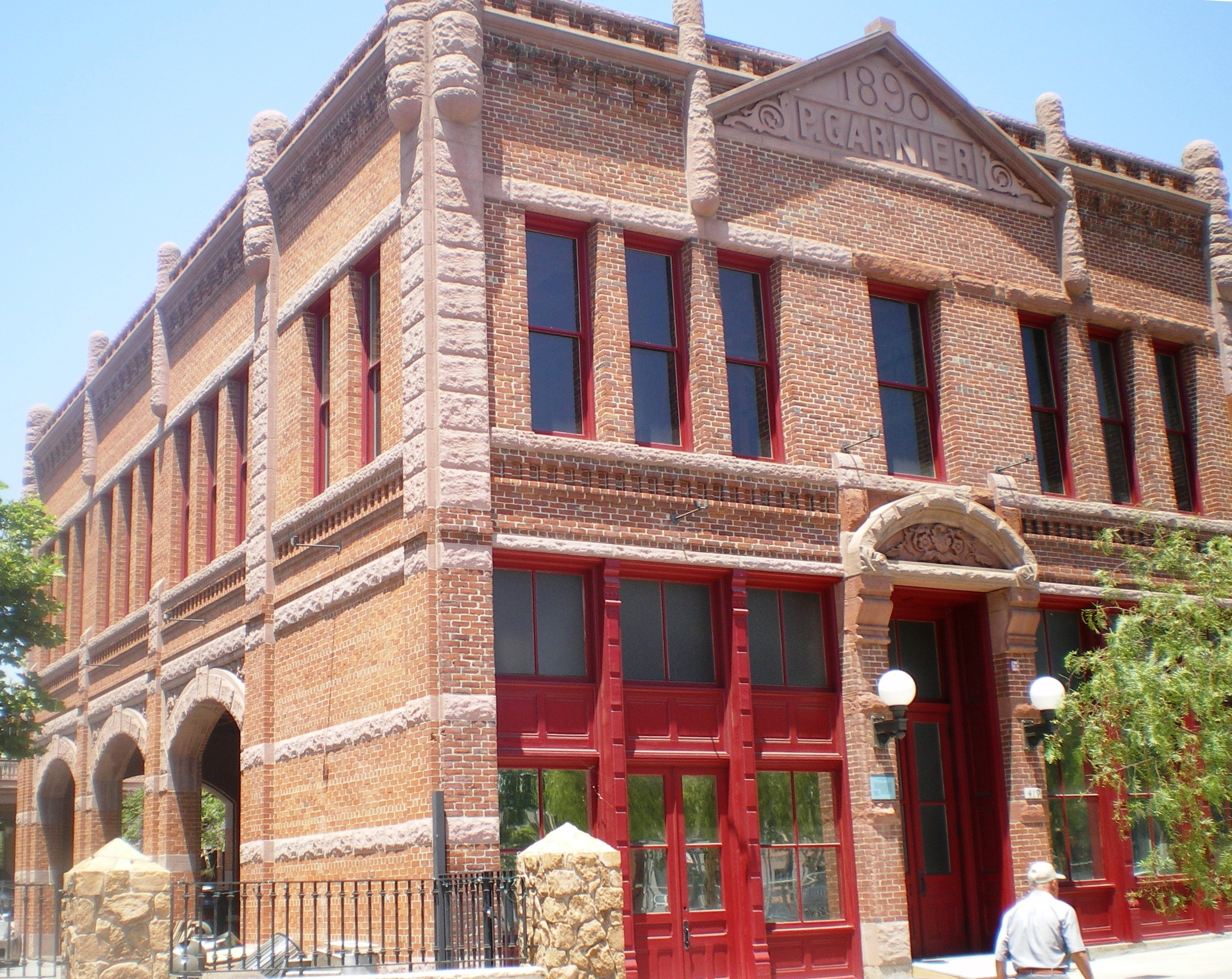
Garnier Building

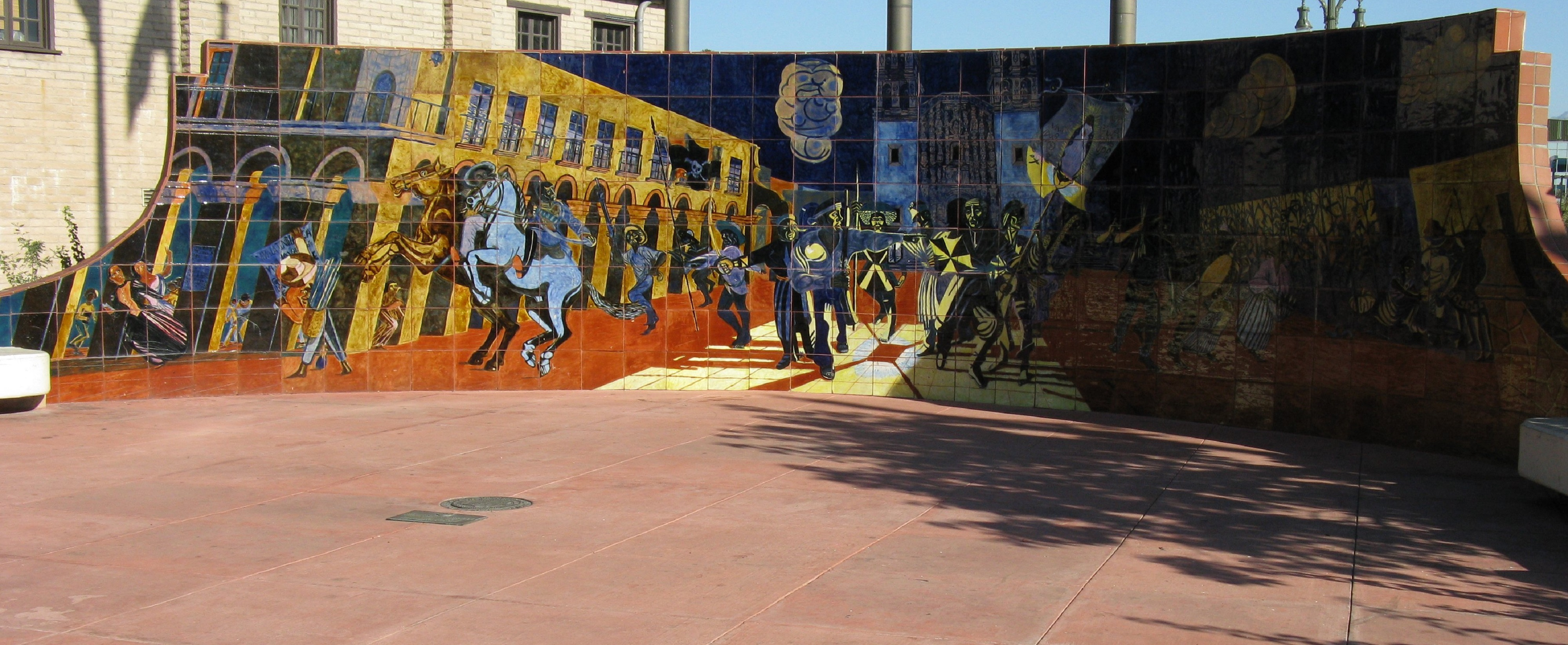
Mural shows important events

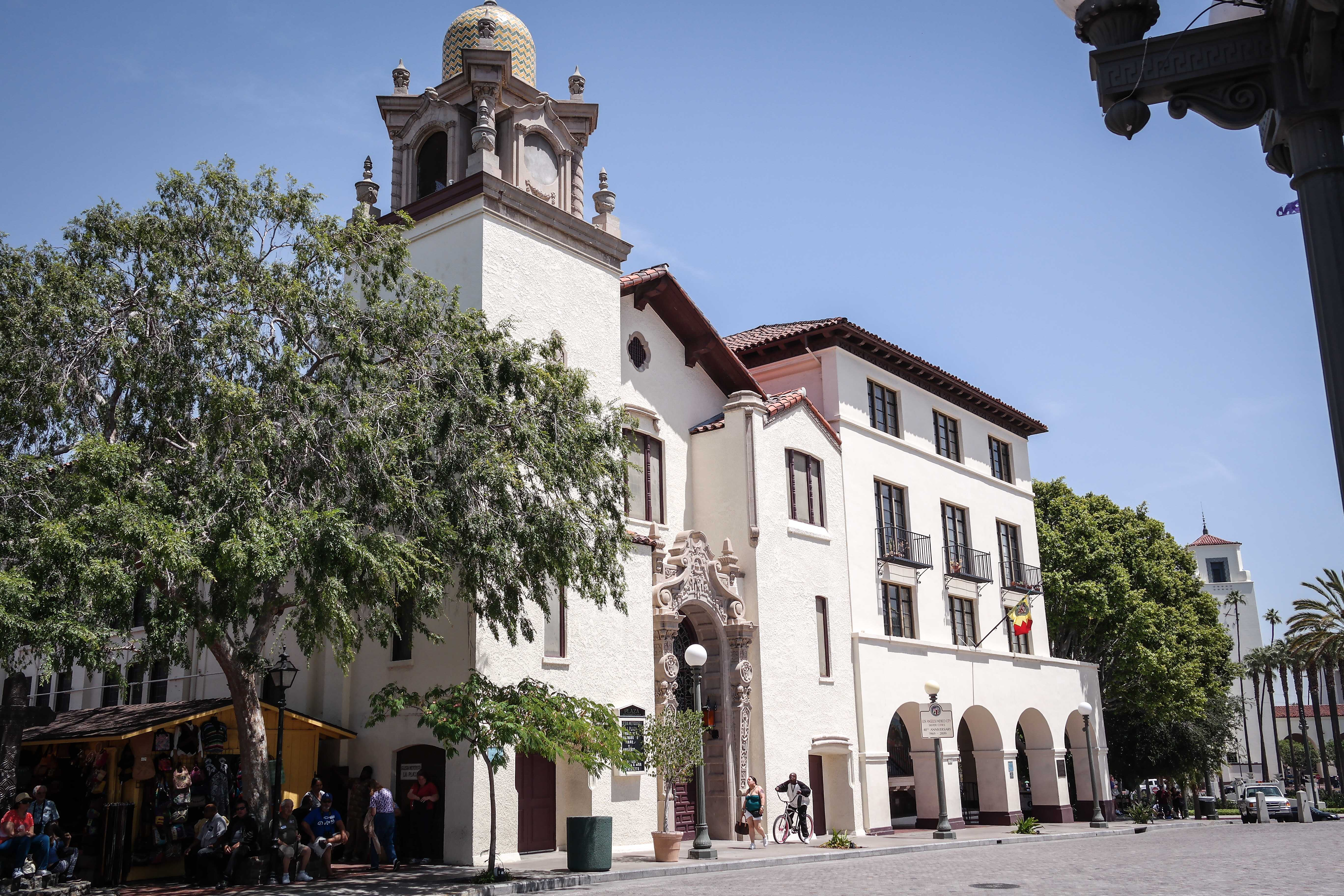
Eugene Biscailuz Building and former Methodist Church HQ, now Mexican Cultural Center

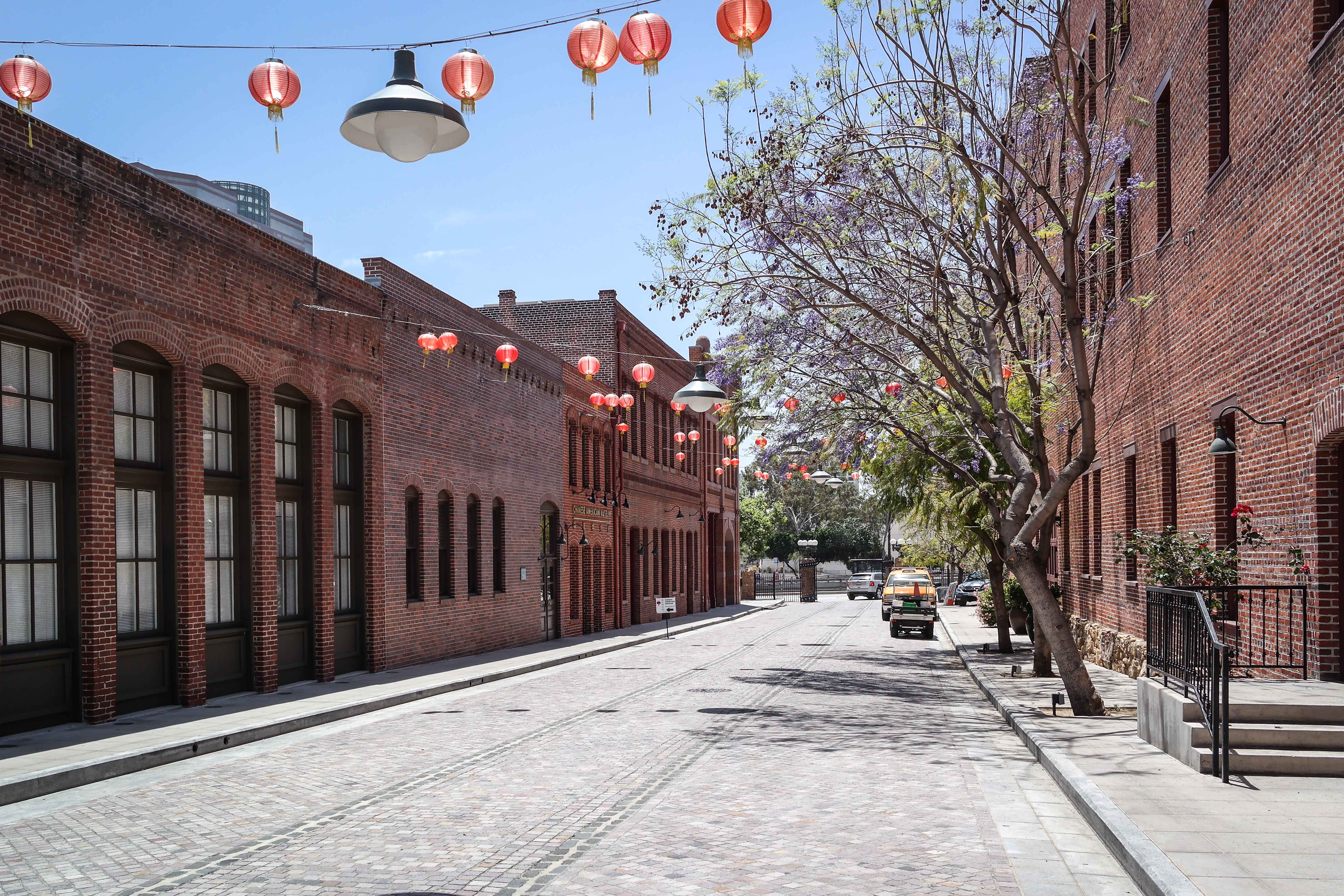
Sanchez Street, which runs south from the center of the Plaza's south side

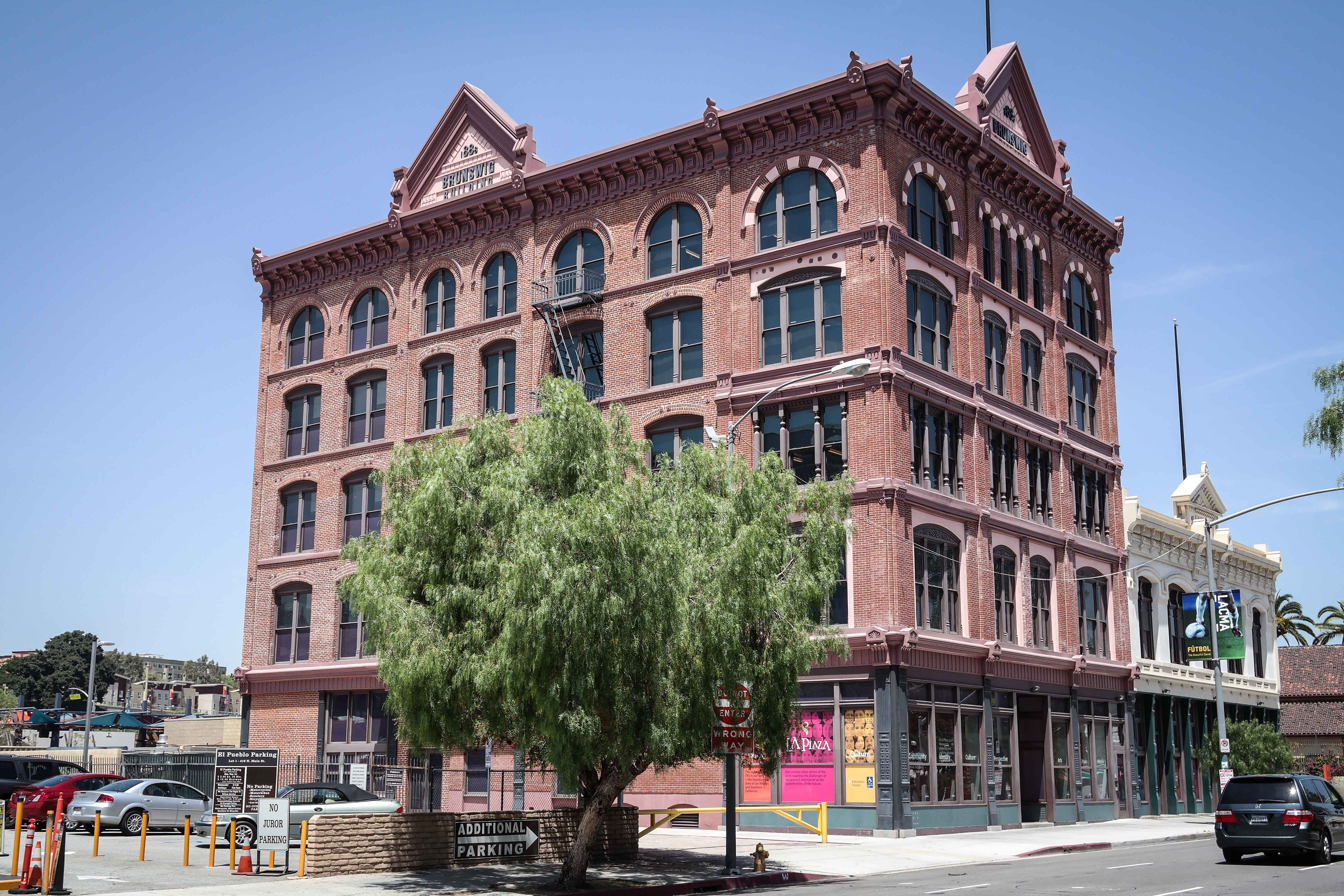
Brunswig Building

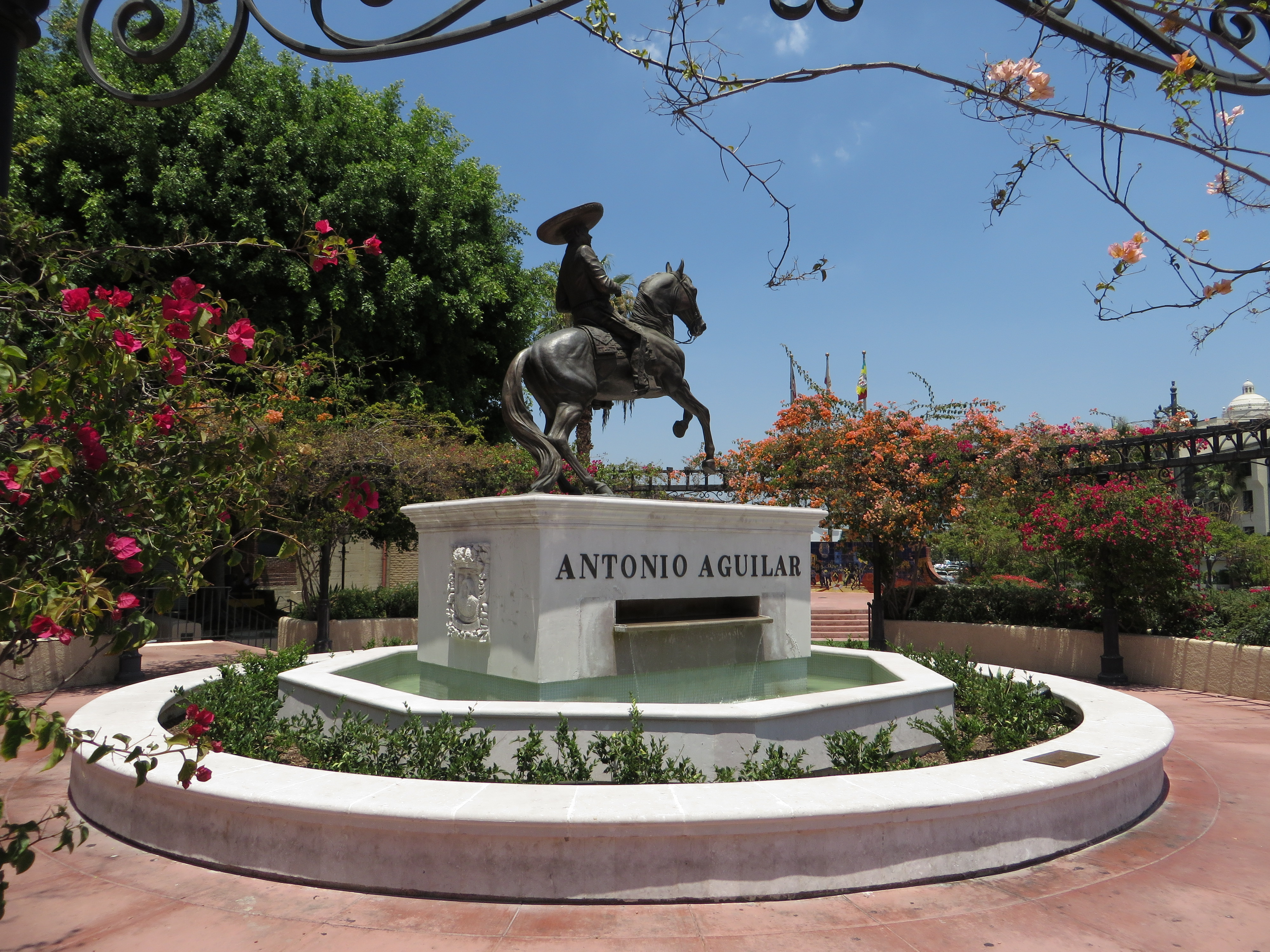
Equestrian statue of Antonio Aguilar

== Major sites ==
=== The Plaza ===
At the center of the Historic District is the plaza . It was described in 1982 as "the focal point" of the state historic park, symbolizing the city's birthplace and "separating Olvera Street's touristy bustle from the Pico-Garnier block's empty buildings." Built in the 1820s, the plaza was the city's commercial and social center. It remains the site of many festivals and celebrations. The plaza has large statues of two figures in the city's history, including one of Charles III of Spain, the monarch who ordered the founding of the Pueblo de Los Ángeles in 1780, and another of Felipe de Neve, the Spanish Governor of the Californias who selected the site of the Pueblo and laid out the town. In addition to this, the plaza is dedicated to commemorating the original forty-four settlers (Los Pobladores), and the four soldiers who accompanied them. A large plaque listing their names was erected in the plaza, and later plaques dedicated to the individual eleven families were placed in the ground encircling the gazebo in the center of the plaza.

=== Buildings on the Plaza ===
==== La Placita Church ====
The parish church in the Plaza Historic District, known as La Iglesia de Nuestra Señora la Reina de Los Ángeles (The Church of Our Lady the Queen of the Angels), was founded in 1814. The structure was completed and dedicated in 1822. The present church, which replaced it, was built in 1861. The church was one of the first three sites designated as Historic Cultural Monuments by the City of Los Angeles, and has also been designated as a California Historical Landmark.

==== Old Plaza Firehouse ====
The Old Plaza Firehouse is the oldest firehouse in Los Angeles. Built in 1884, it operated as a firehouse until 1897. The building was thereafter used as a saloon, cigar store, poolroom, "seedy hotel", Chinese market, "flop house", and drugstore. The building was restored in the 1950s and opened as a firefighting museum in 1960.

==== Los Angeles Plaza Park ====
Los Angeles Plaza Park (formerly known as Father Serra Park) is an open area within the plaza. It is the site of the demolished Lugo Adobe. In June 2020 protestors toppled a statue of Father Junípero Serra, due to Serra's role during the colonization of California.

=== Buildings on Olvera Street ===
Olvera Street, known for its Mexican marketplace, was originally known as Wine Street. In 1877, it was extended and renamed in honor of Judge Augustín Olvera, the first ever elected county judge in Los Angeles. Many of the Plaza District's contributing historic buildings, including the Avila Adobe and Sepulveda House, are located on Olvera Street. In 1930, it was adapted by local merchants into the colorful marketplace that operates today.

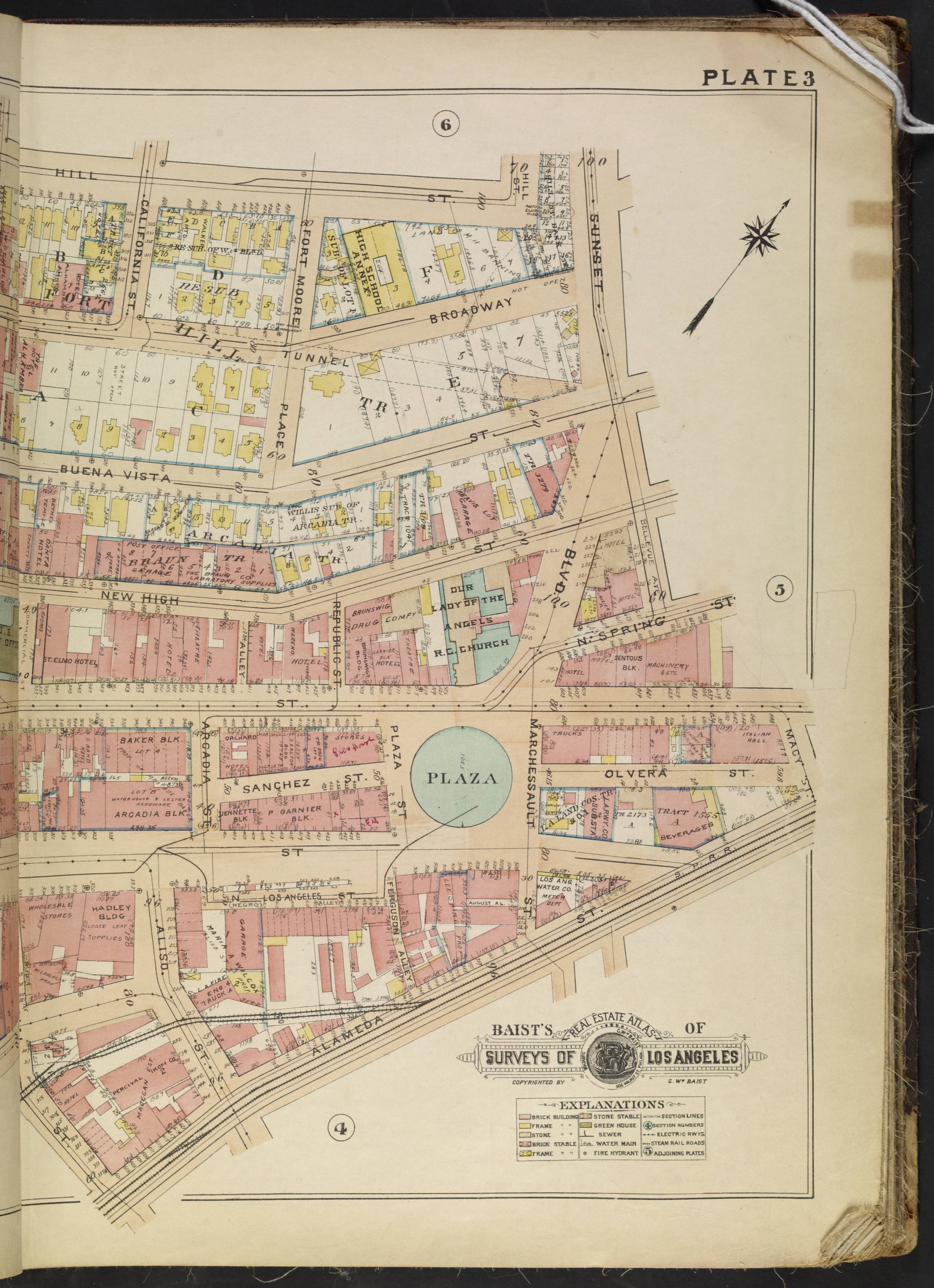
The Plaza and Olvera Street in 1921

=== Avila Adobe ===
The Avila Adobe at 10 Olvera Street was built in 1818 and is the oldest surviving residence in Los Angeles. It was built by Francisco Ávila, a wealthy cattle rancher. Its adobe walls are 2½ to 3 feet (0.91 m) thick. U. S. Navy Commodore Robert Stockton took it over as his temporary headquarters when the United States first occupied the city in 1846. Listed on the National Register of Historic Places, the adobe is also designated as California State Landmark No. 145. It was restored starting 1926 through efforts by Christine Sterling, and now stands as a museum.

=== Sepulveda House ===
The Sepulveda House at 12 Olvera Street is a historic residence built in 1887 by Señora Eloisa Martinez de Sepulveda in the Eastlake architectural style. The original structure included two commercial businesses and three residences. It has since then become a preserved museum, and is cited by its website as a representation of the "blending of Mexican and Anglo culture".

Eloisa Martínez de Sepúlveda was born in the state of Sonora in Mexico. She lived there until 1844 when her parents, Francisca Gallardo and Estaquio Martinez, moved to Alta California at the urging of Francisca’s brother, bringing the 11-year-old Eloisa and her older brother Luis, with them to Los Angeles. In 1847, Señora Francisca Gallardo received from the ayuntamiento (Common Council) a plot of land between Bath and Wine street (renamed Olvera Street in 1877) on which she constructed an adobe residence. Señora Gallardo’s adobe home at number 12 Bath Street was later enlarged to include by 1870 a second story and hipped roof. When Eloisa married Joaquin Sepulveda at the age of 23, she brought with her a dowry of land and cattle. Joaquin was an undistinguished member of an illustrious Southern California family. The marriage suffered from misfortune as the couple’s only child died in infancy and Joaquin himself died in 1880 leaving no property. Señora Gallardo gave her property to her widowed daughter, Eloisa Martinez de Sepulveda, in 1881. On lands owned by her mother, Eloisa was able to finance the construction of a commercial building which provided her with a steady income. This was the Sepulveda Block, built in 1887.

Señora Eloisa Martinez de Sepulveda built the two-story Sepulveda Block in 1887 in response to the city’s real estate and population boom of the 1800s. The twenty-two room building cost $8,000 to erect. As her husband, Joaquin Sepulveda, had died seven years earlier leaving no estate, Señora Sepulveda probably financed the construction of the building on her own. By 1888 Bath Street had been renamed Main Street and the city had realigned and widened it, cutting off 18 feet (5.5 m) from the front of the adobe. Señora Sepulveda received $1,190 in compensation.

When the Sepulveda Block was built in 1887 Señora Eloisa Sepulveda kept a suite of three rooms for her own use. Her bedroom reveals much about her Mexican heritage and the popular tastes and styles of the time. It would also reflect some of the places in Los Angeles in the decades following her arrival from Sonora in 1844. The décor of the room shows a practical acceptance of modern technology and contemporary fashion, with its mass-produced walnut furniture and gaslight chandelier. The bedroom has three different wallpapers and a typical flowered carpet. The somewhat-cluttered appearance is characteristic of the period and a sign of modest prosperity. By contrast, the brass bed with its draperies and fancy spread, the Chinese shawl, and the well-tended shrine are representative of Señora Sepulveda’s Mexican upbringing and her strong religious beliefs. The large crucifix is on loan from Señora Sepulveda’s descendants while the bed belonged to the Avila family, who were related to her by marriage. The pastel portrait is of her favorite niece, Eloisa Martinez de Gibbs.

Señora Sepulveda chose American architects George F. Costerisan and William O. Merithew to design her two-story business block for residential and commercial rental in 1887. Although this particular type of building is probably unique in Los Angeles today, it was a “pattern book” building of a style that was common all over the country at the time. An exception in this building is the typically Mexican breezeway which separates the Main Street stores from the dwelling rooms in the rear. Thus, the Sepulveda Block represents the transition in Los Angeles from Mexican to a combination of Anglo and Mexican styles. The work “block” is the Victorian term for a large commercial building. By this time the city had changed from a Mexican pueblo with a cattle-based economy to an American town with an agricultural economy. The population had grown from less than 2,000, most of whom were Mexican, to over 50,000, only 19% of whom were Mexican. When the building was constructed it appears that Señora Sepulveda herself occupied the three residential rooms located in the rear, facing Olvera Street, then an unpaved alley. Later, she may have occupied other quarters. Commercial tenants were located in the stores fronting on Main Street while the second floor was used as a boarding house.

Señora Sepulveda bequeathed the building on her death in 1903 to her favorite niece and goddaughter, Eloisa Martinez de Gibbs. Edward Gibbs, an engineer and lumber company owner, had been a tenant in the Sepulveda Block. In 1888, the same year that he and Eloisa were married, Edward was elected to the City Council. Four of their five children were born in the second floor facing Main Street on the south side. In 1905, along with many other residents of the area, the Gibbs moved to a more fashionable neighborhood in Los Angeles. Succeeding generations of the Gibbs family operated the Gibbs Electrical Company and retained ownership of the Sepulveda Block until it was acquired by the State of California for $135,000 in 1958 as part of the Pueblo de Los Angeles State Historic Monument.

Between 1982 and 1984 major restoration took place in the Sepulveda Block. The building was structurally stabilized and plumbing, heating, air conditioning and electrical systems were installed. A new roof replaced the old one and the front staircase, which had been removed in the 1930s, was put back. The iron cresting is restored as are the red tin tiles over the bay windows. The west façade is “penciled” in the style of the period, meaning that the bricks are painted and mortar lines are traced in white on top. The east façade on Olvera Street, although not originally painted, had previously been sandblasted, a process which destroys the outer surface of the brick, making it porous. As paint provides bricks with protective coating, they have been painted with the color which was first used in 1919. A 1983 archeological excavation beneath the wooden floor unearthed artifacts relating to the building’s history. Peter Snell, partner with Long Hoeft Architects and Gus Duffy Architect, were the firms responsible for the Sepulveda Block restoration plans and construction supervision.

During World War II the Sepulveda Block became a canteen for servicemen and three Olvera Street merchants were located in the building. The building continued to be used by Olvera Street merchants until 1981 when they were relocated for the building’s restoration. Today, El Pueblo Park’s Visitor’s Center is located in the south store on the ground floor. This room represents the Victorian Eastlake style of 1890. Restoration plans call for the creation of an 1890s grocery store on the north side of the first floor.

=== Mural América Tropical ===
The mural América Tropical (full name: América Tropical: Oprimida y Destrozada por los Imperialismos, or Tropical America: Oppressed and Destroyed by Imperialism,) by David Siqueiros, was unveiled above the street in 1932. It was soon covered up to mask its political content. The Getty Conservation Institute has performed detailed conservation work on the mural to restore it and the America Tropical Interpretive Center opened to provide public access.

=== Plaza Substation ===
The Plaza Substation, also at 10 Olvera Street, was part of the electric streetcar system operated by the Los Angeles Railway. Completed in 1904, the substation provided electricity to power the yellow streetcars. When the streetcar system closed in the 1940s, the building was converted to other uses. The substation is one of the two buildings in the district that is separately listed in the National Register of Historic Places (the Avila Adobe is the other).

=== Pelanconi House ===
Pelanconi House at 17 Olvera Street, built in the 1850s, is the oldest surviving brick house in Los Angeles. In 1924, it was converted into a restaurant called La Golondrina, which was the oldest restaurant on Olvera Street until its closure in March 2020 during the COVID-19 pandemic. The Pelanconi House was a winery producing wine from the grapes that grew in the area, possibly even inside the Avila Adobe where they grow currently. The DNA matches that of grapes at Mission San Gabriel, established in 1771.

=== Plaza Methodist Church ===
Built in 1926, the Plaza Methodist Church was built on the site of the adobe once owned by Agustín Olvera, the man for whom Olvera Street was named. It is at the southeast corner of Olvera Street and Paseo de la Plaza (i.e. the Plaza).

=== Eugene Biscailuz Building ===
The former United Methodist Church headquarters, also built in 1926, was renamed in 1965 for Sheriff Eugene W. Biscailuz, who had helped Christine Sterling to preserve and transform Olvera Street. It housed the Mexican Consulate until 1991 and then the Mexican Cultural Institute.

=== Buildings on Main Street ===
==== Gallery (west side) ====
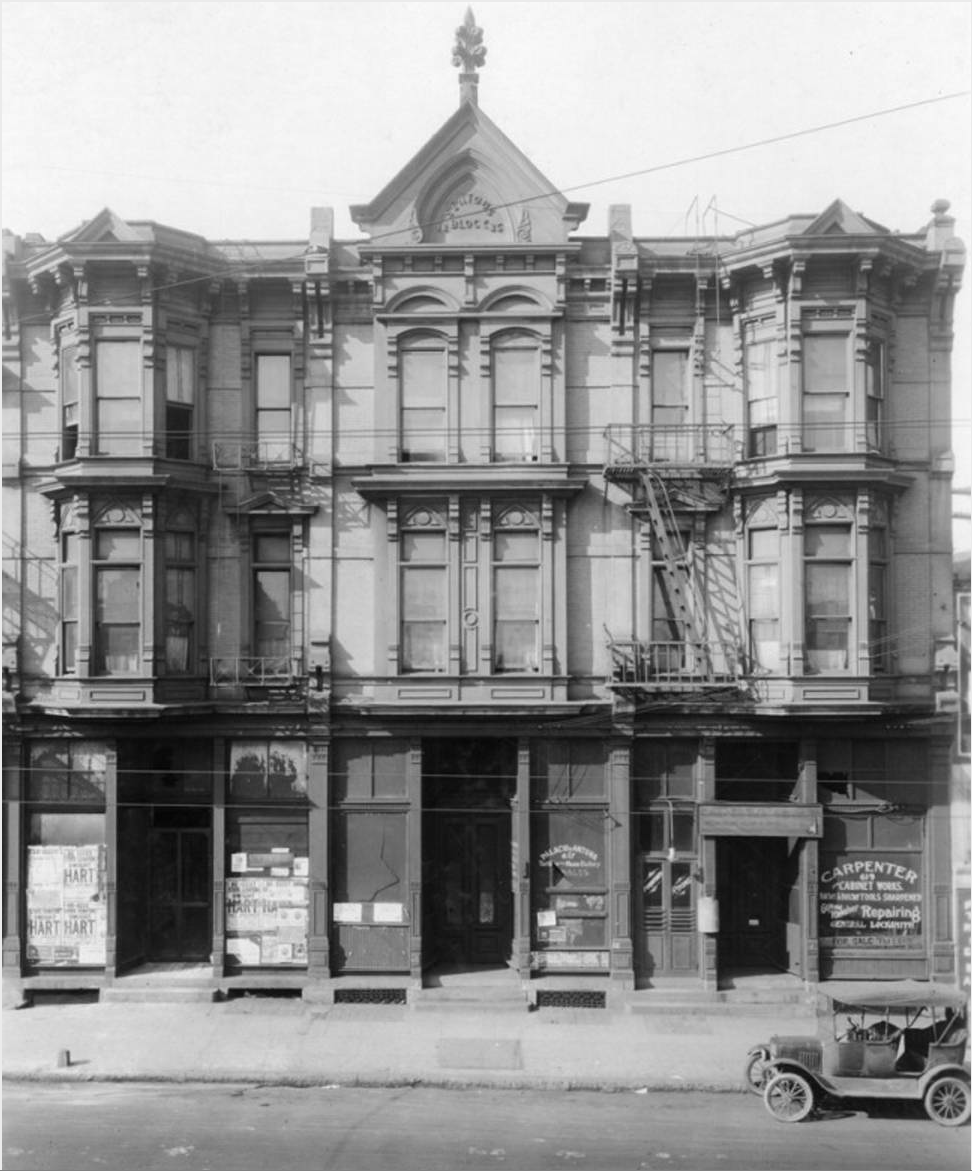
Sentous Block a.k.a. Sentous Building, 1920

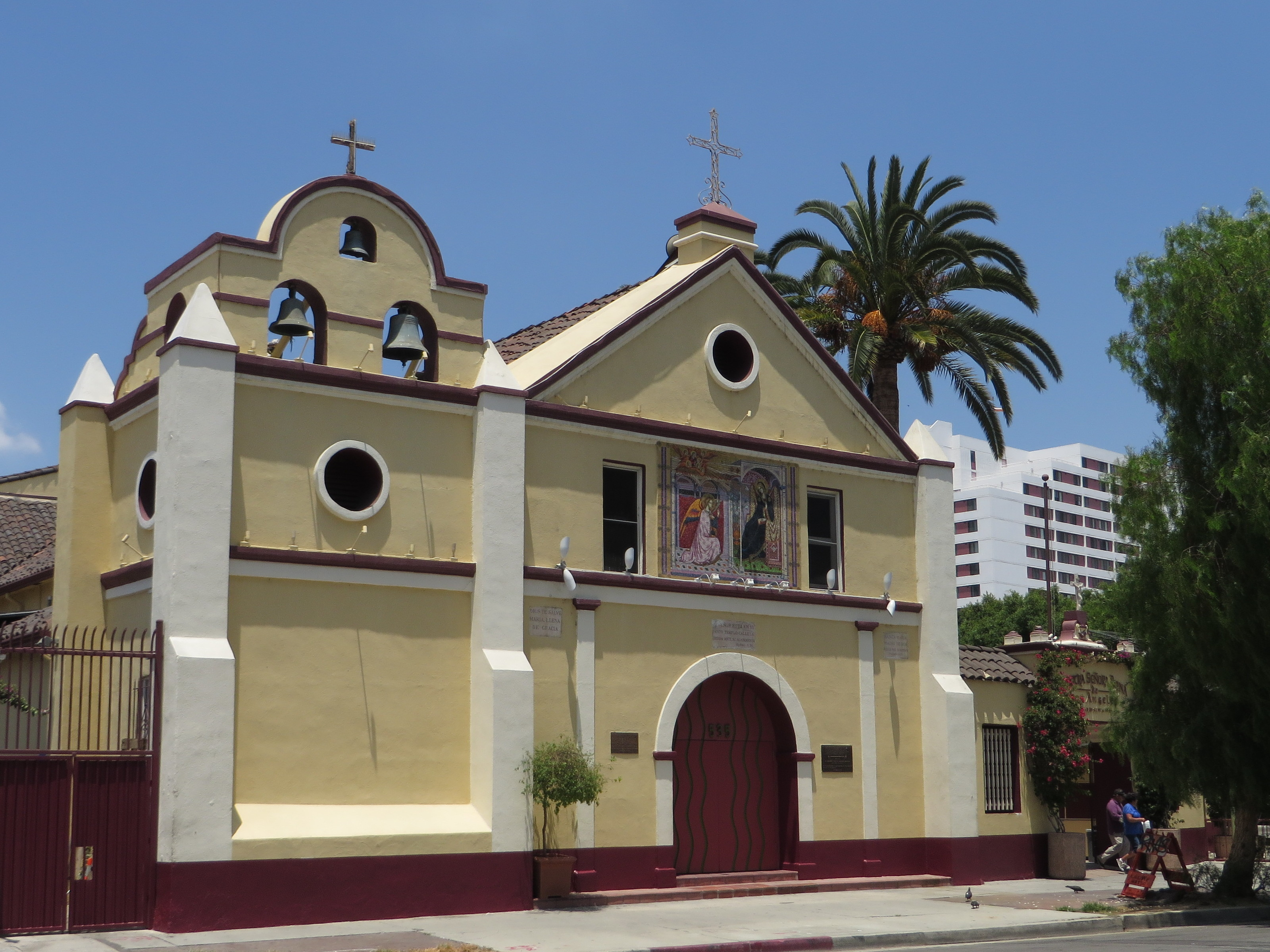
La Placita Church (La Iglesia de Nuestra Señora la Reina de los Ángeles)

Vickrey-Brunswig Building

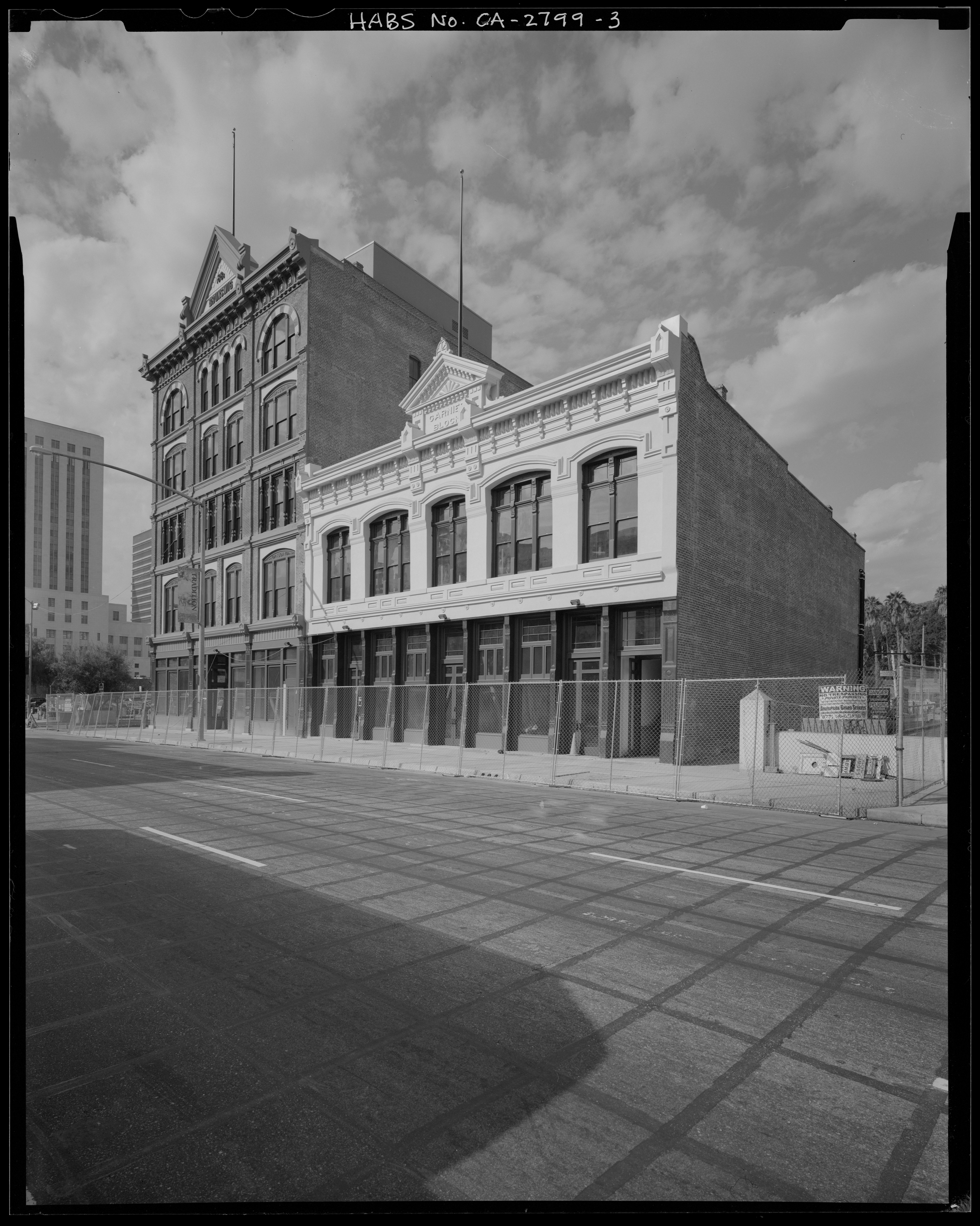
Vickrey-Brunswig Building and Plaza House

==== Gallery (east side) ====
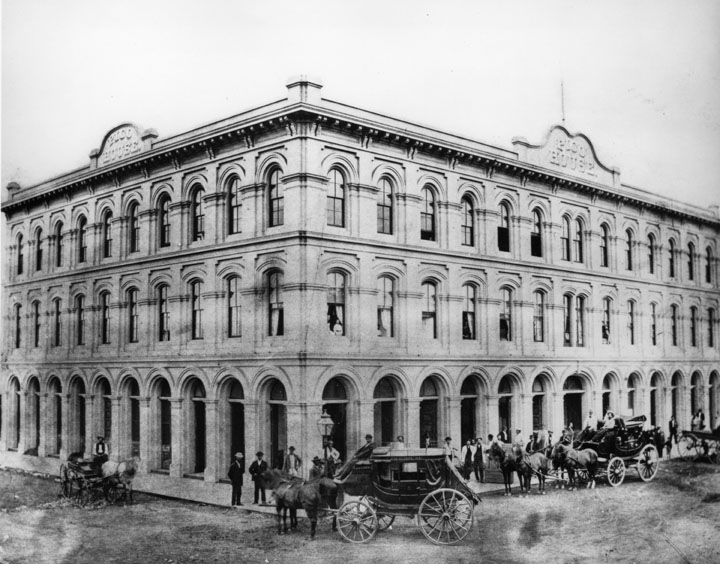
Pico House in 1875

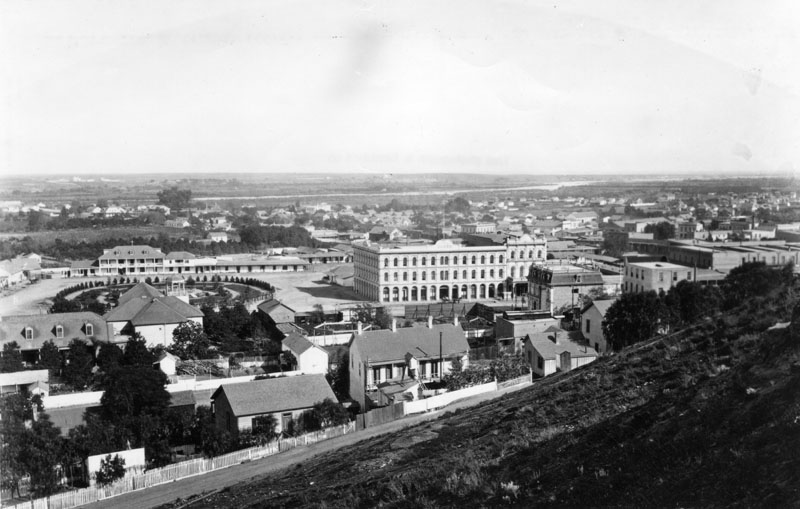
Pico House and the Plaza in 1876, photo taken from Fort Moore

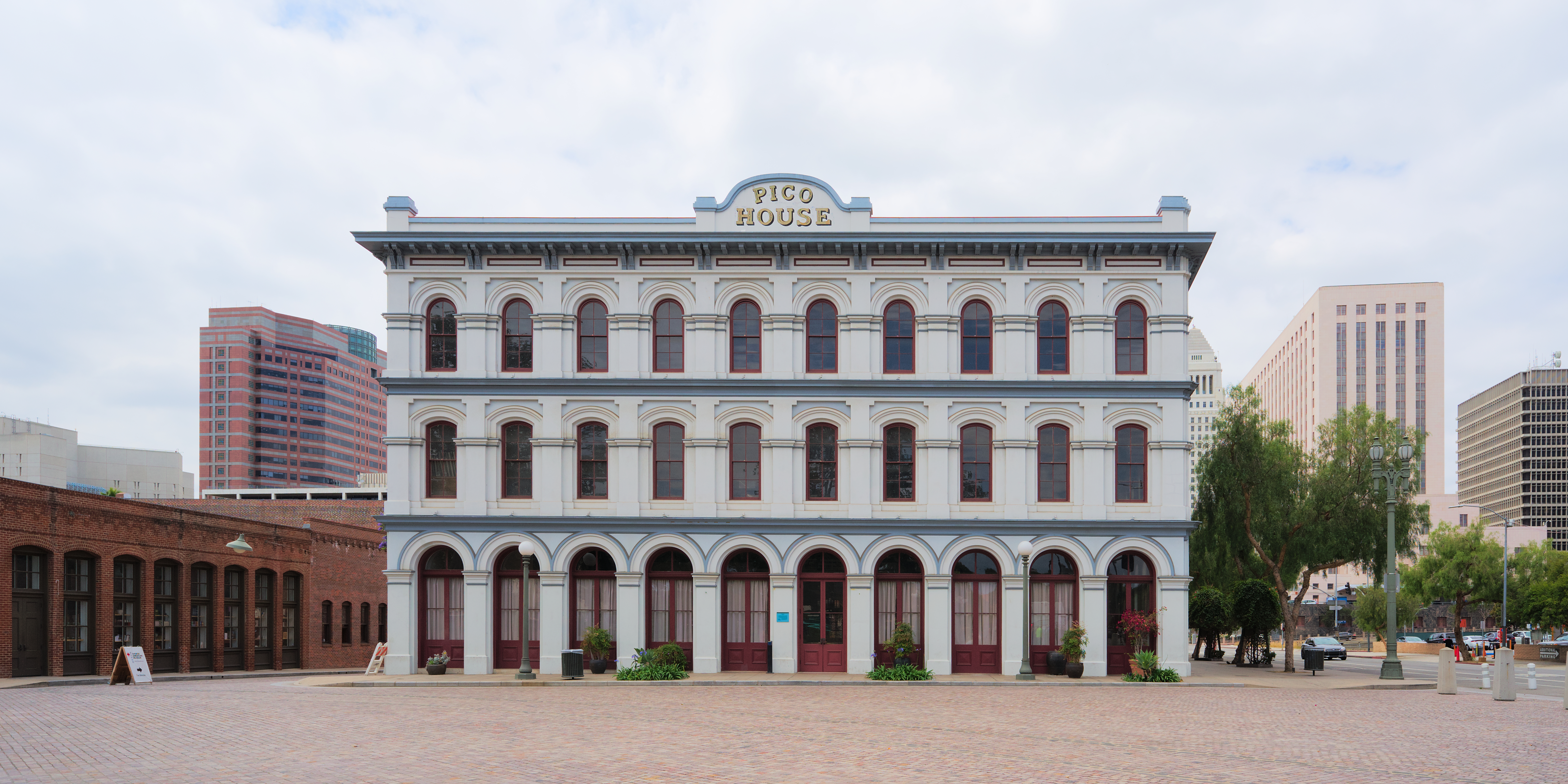
Pico House today

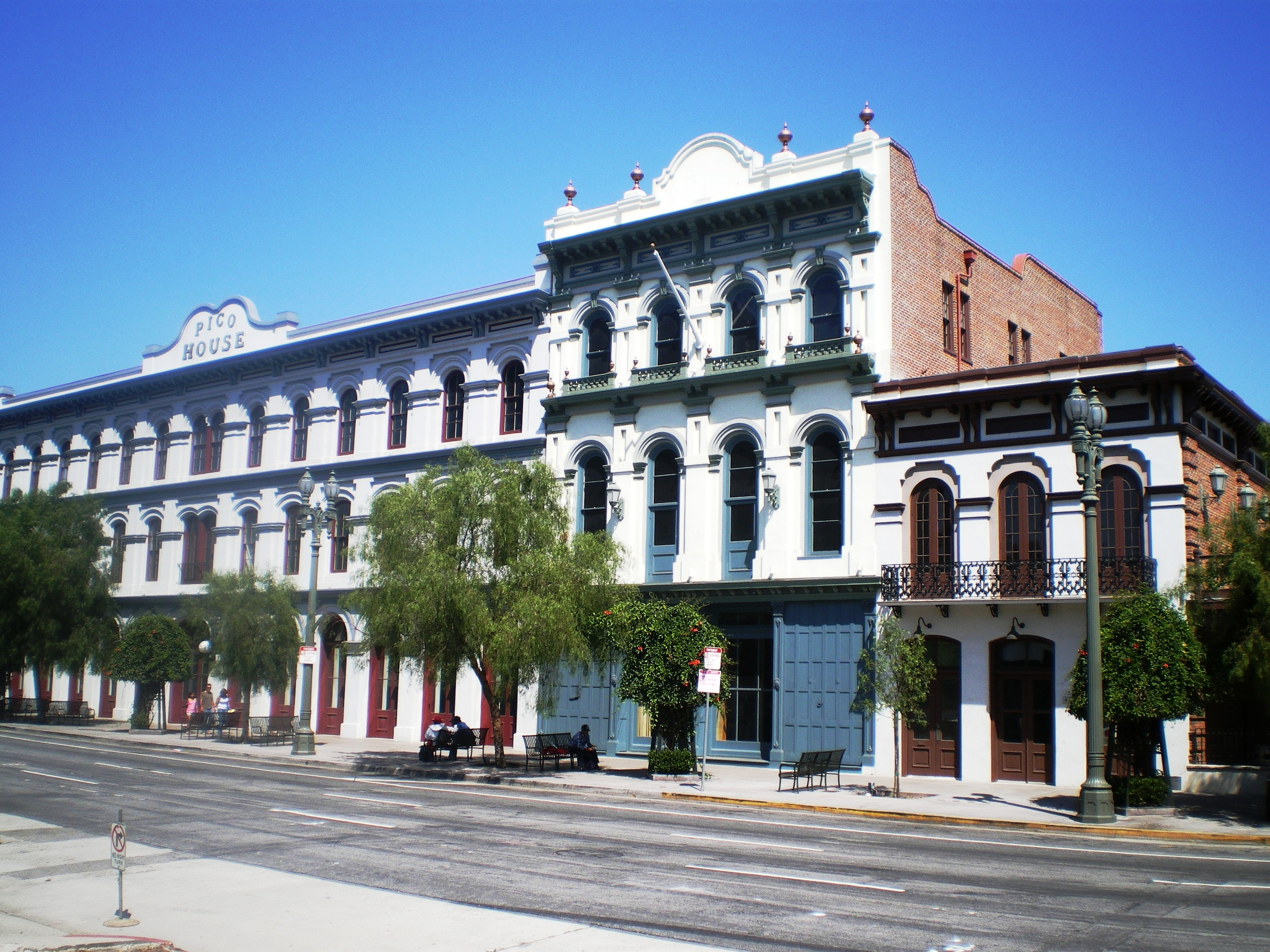
Pico House, Merced Theater and Masonic Hall

==== Pico House ====
Pico House was a luxury hotel built in 1870 by Pío Pico, a successful businessman who was the last Mexican Governor of Alta California. With indoor plumbing, gas-lit chandeliers, a grand double staircase, lace curtains, and a French restaurant, the Italianate three-story, 33-room hotel was the most elegant hotel in Southern California. It had a total of nearly eighty rooms. The Pico House is listed as a California Historical Landmark (No. 159).

==== Masonic Hall ====
Masonic Hall at 416 N. Main St., was built in 1858 as Lodge 42 of the Free and Accepted Masons. The building was a painted brick structure with a symbolic "Masonic eye" below the parapet. In 1868, the Masons moved to larger quarters further south. Afterward, the building was used for many purposes, including a pawn shop and boarding house. It is the oldest building in Los Angeles south of the Plaza.

==== Merced Theater ====
The Merced Theater, completed in 1870, was built in an Italianate style and operated as a live theatre from 1871 to 1876. When the Woods Opera House opened nearby in 1876, the Merced ceased being the city's leading theatre. Eventually, it gained an "unenviable reputation" because of "the disreputable dances staged there, and was finally closed by the authorities."

==== Plaza House ====
This two-story building at 507–511 N. Main St. houses part of the LA Plaza de Cultura y Artes, which includes the Vickrey -Brunswig Building next door. It is inscribed on its upper floor, and on 1890s maps it is marked, "Garnier Block" (not to be confused with the Garnier Block/Building on Los Angeles Street, one block away). Commissioned in 1883 by Philippe Garnier, once housed the "La Esperanza" bakery.

==== Vickrey-Brunswig Building ====
This five-story brick building facing the Plaza at 501 N. Main St. houses LA Plaza de Cultura y Artes, which also occupies the Plaza House next door. It was built in 1888 and combines Italianate and Victorian architecture; the architect was Robert Brown Young.

==== Site of Sentous Building ====
The Sentous Block or Sentous Building (19th c., demolished late 1950s) was located at 615-9 N Main St., with a back entrance on 616-620 North Spring St. (previously called Upper Main St., then San Fernando St.). Designed in 1886 by Burgess J. Reeve. Louis Sentous was a French pioneer in the early days of Los Angeles. The San Fernando Theatre was located here. The site is now part of the El Pueblo parking lot.

=== Buildings on Los Angeles Street ===
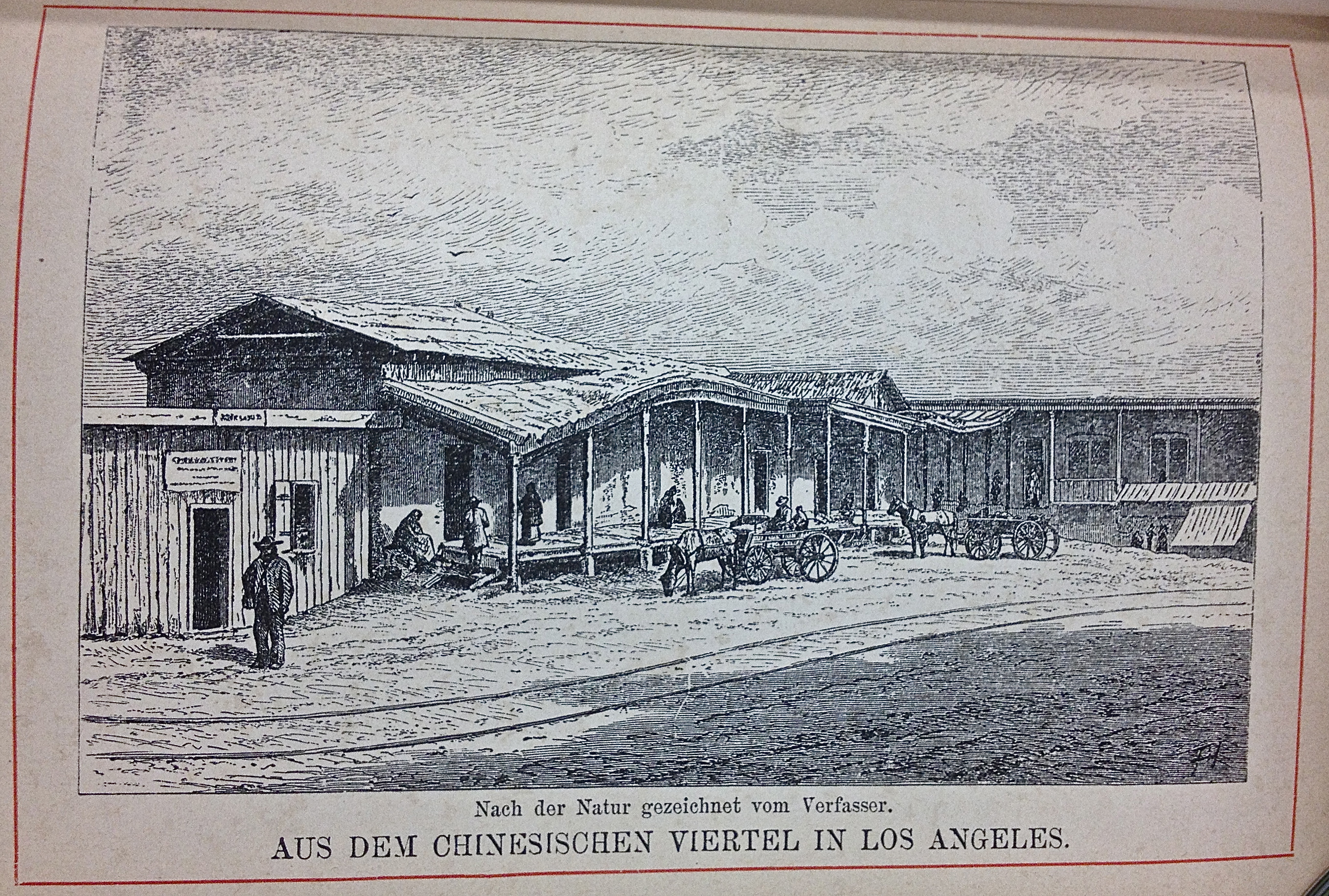
Old Chinatown stretched from Sanchez Street across Los Angeles Street to what is now Union Station. c.1885.

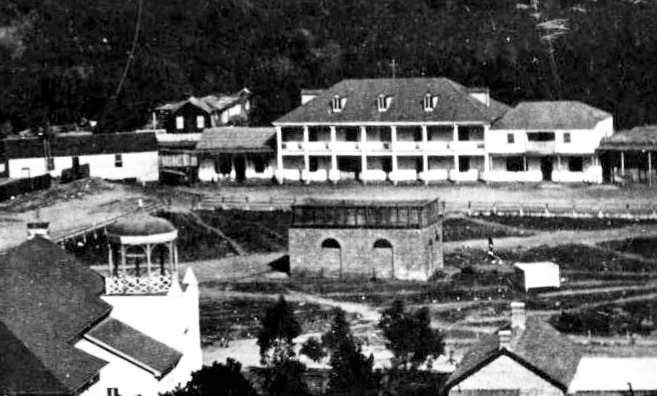
Lugo Adobe lining the eastern edge of Los Angeles Plaza. The street in front of the adobe was part of Los Angeles St. starting in the 1880s.

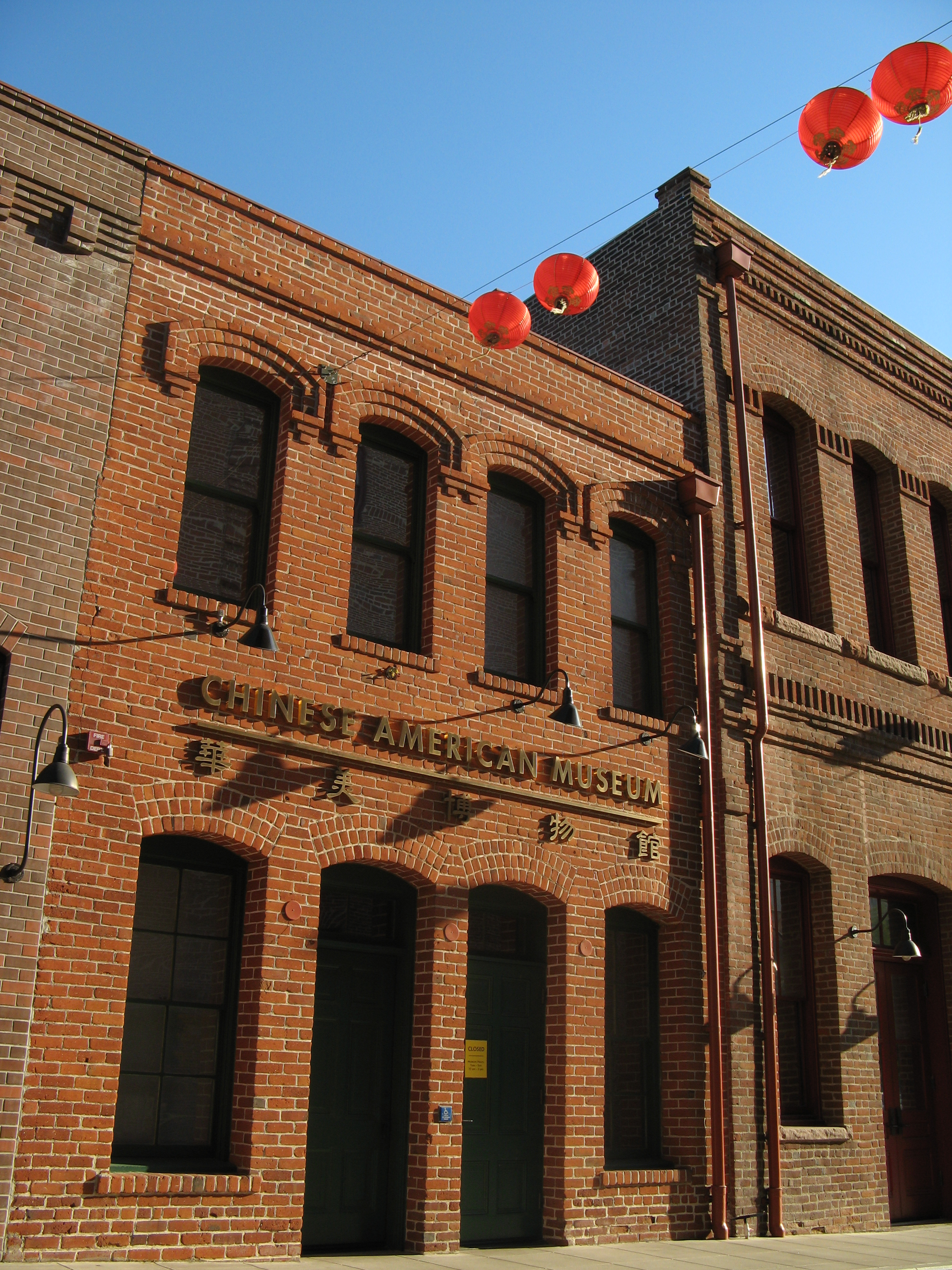
Chinese American Museum in the Garnier Building

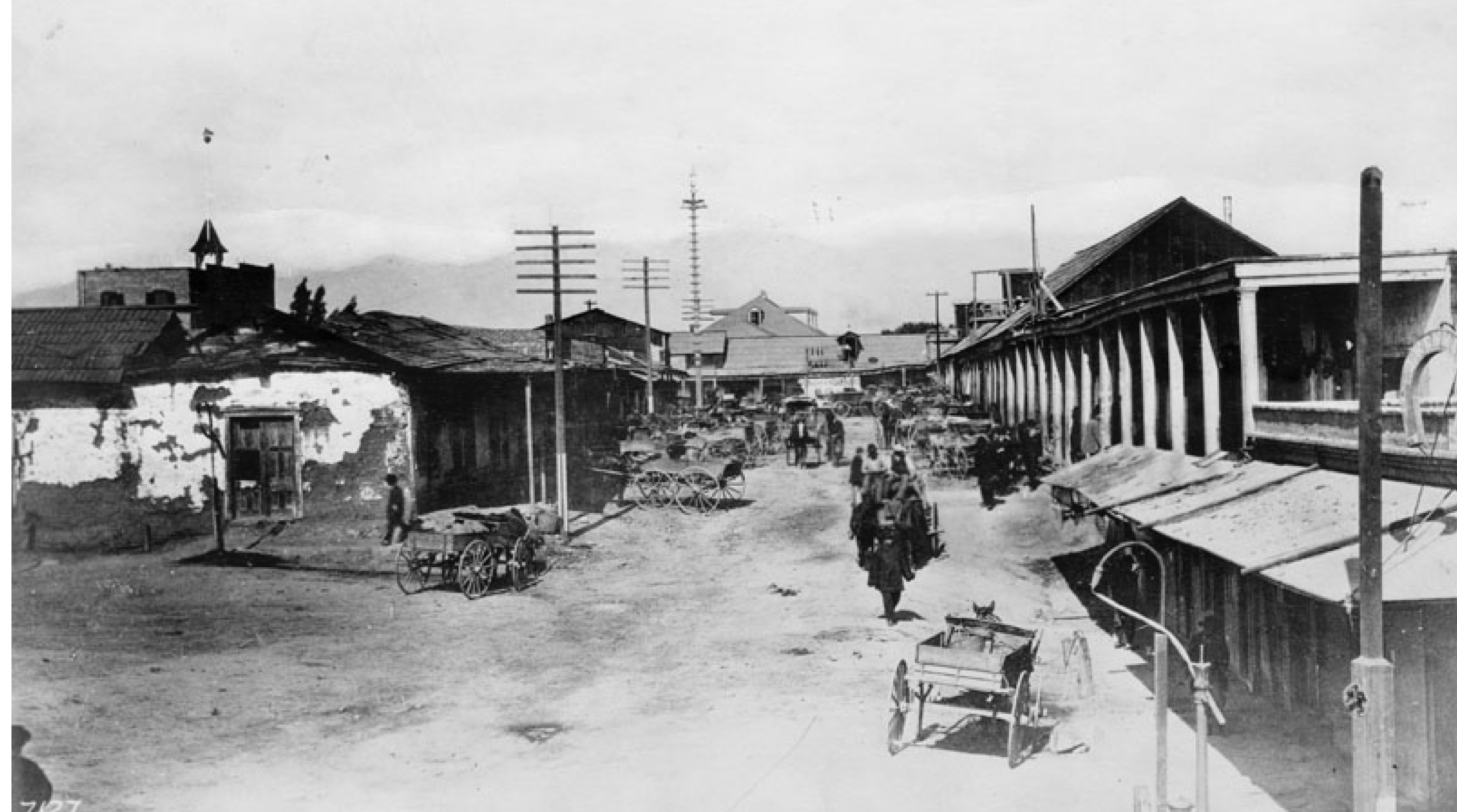
1882 view, looking north from Broad Place along Calle de los Negros to the Ignacio Del Valle adobe in the far background. At left, with the peeling paint, is the Coronel Adobe (SE corner of Arcadia). A few years later, both adobes would be demolished and Los Angeles St. would be extended northward to (and past) the Plaza.

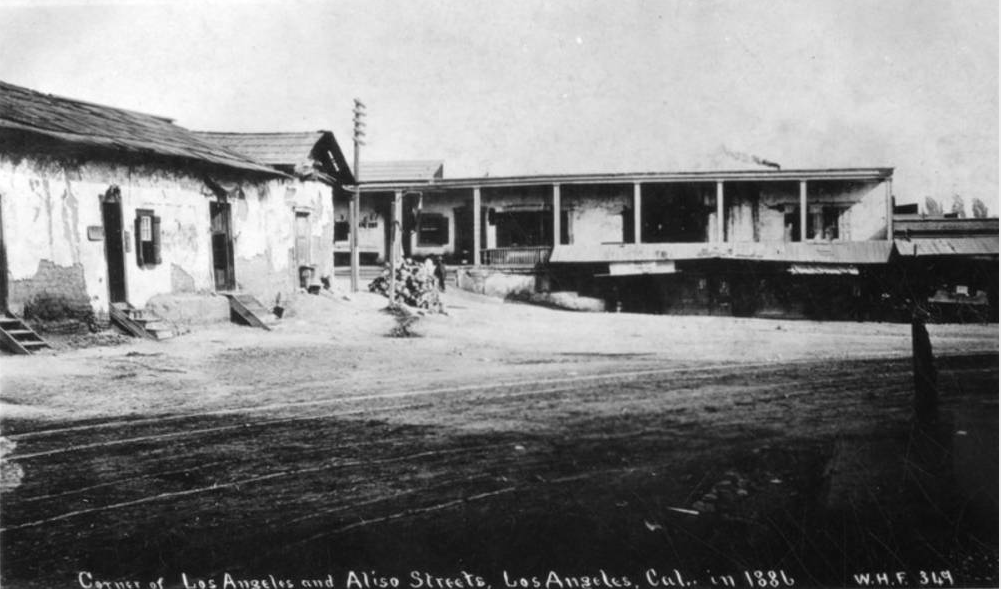
Looking east on Arcadia towards houses lining the east side of Broad Place. Aliso Street runs form their right side towards the background. Calle de los Negros runs to the left in front of them. The Coronel Adobe is at left.

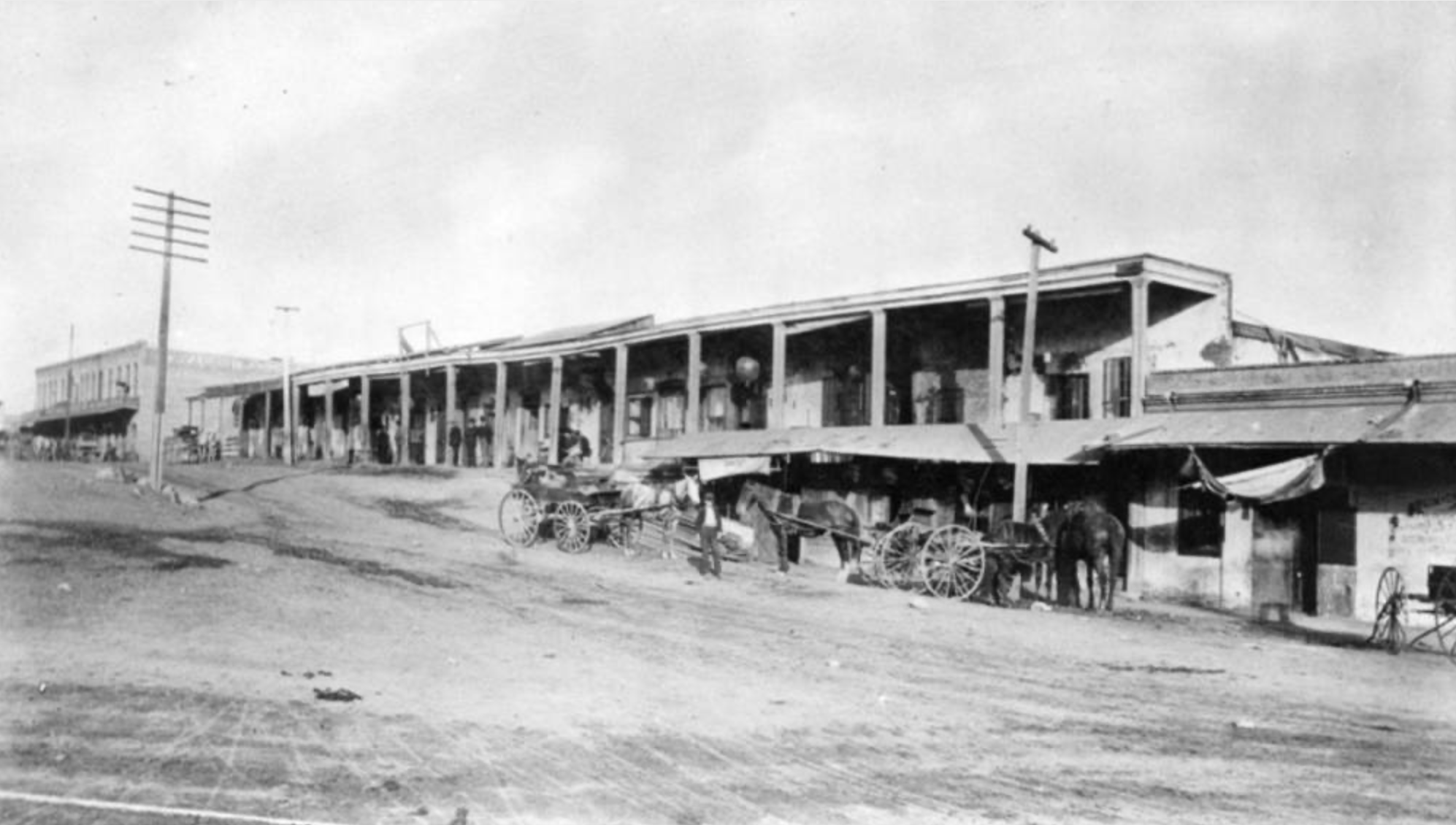
Adobes in Calle de los Negros

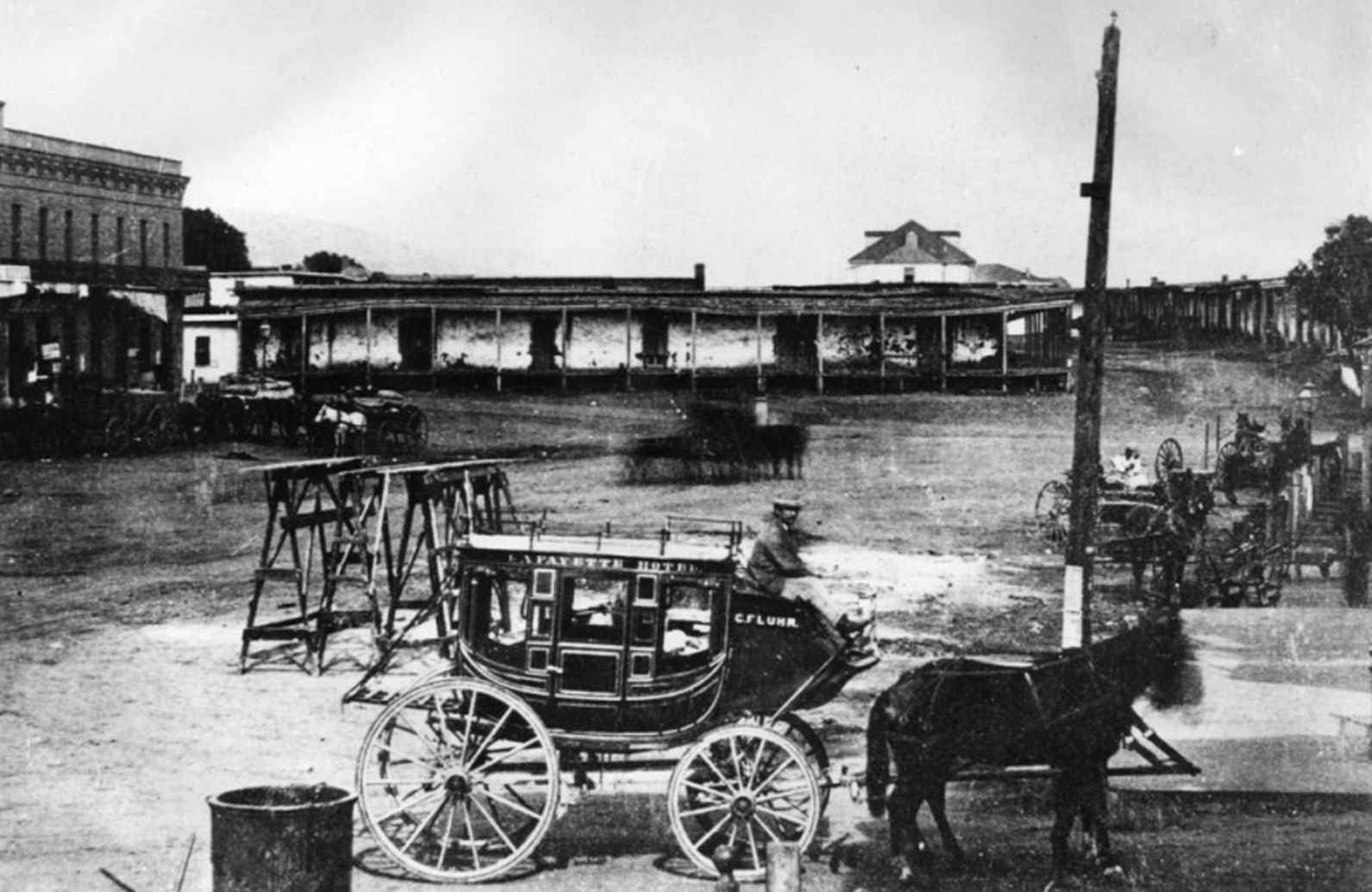
Broad Place at north end of Los Angeles Street c.1870s. At back, Coronel Adobe (l), Calle de los Negros (r)

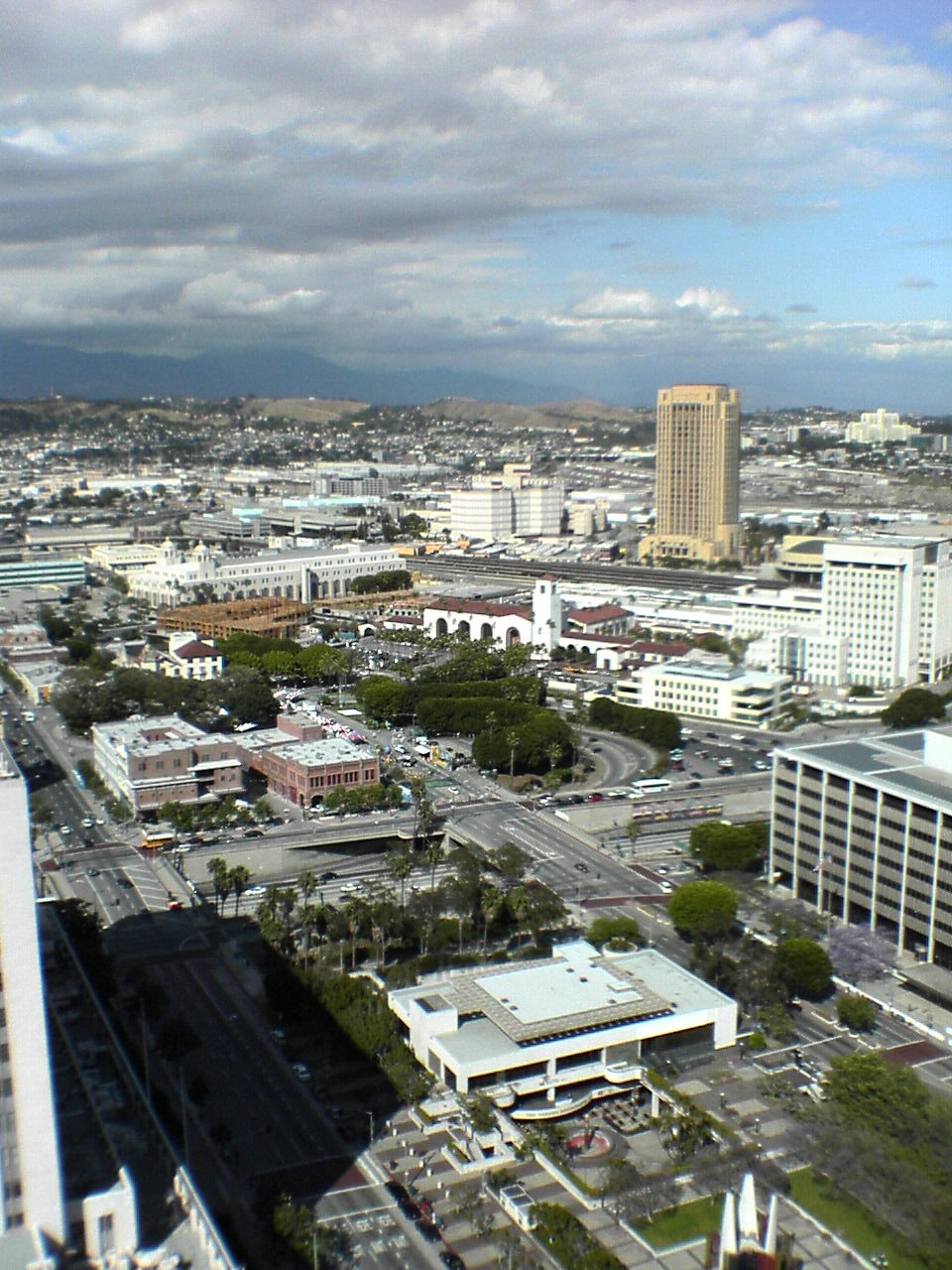
2005 view. Brick buildings at center-left are at the south end of the Plaza. Los Angeles St. runs along the Plaza's right (east) side, south towards the eastern edge of Los Angeles Mall (bottom center). The circular cluster of trees and freeway onramp to the right of the Plaza is the Lugo Adobe site. Behind them is Union Station.

=== Northern end of Los Angeles Street ===
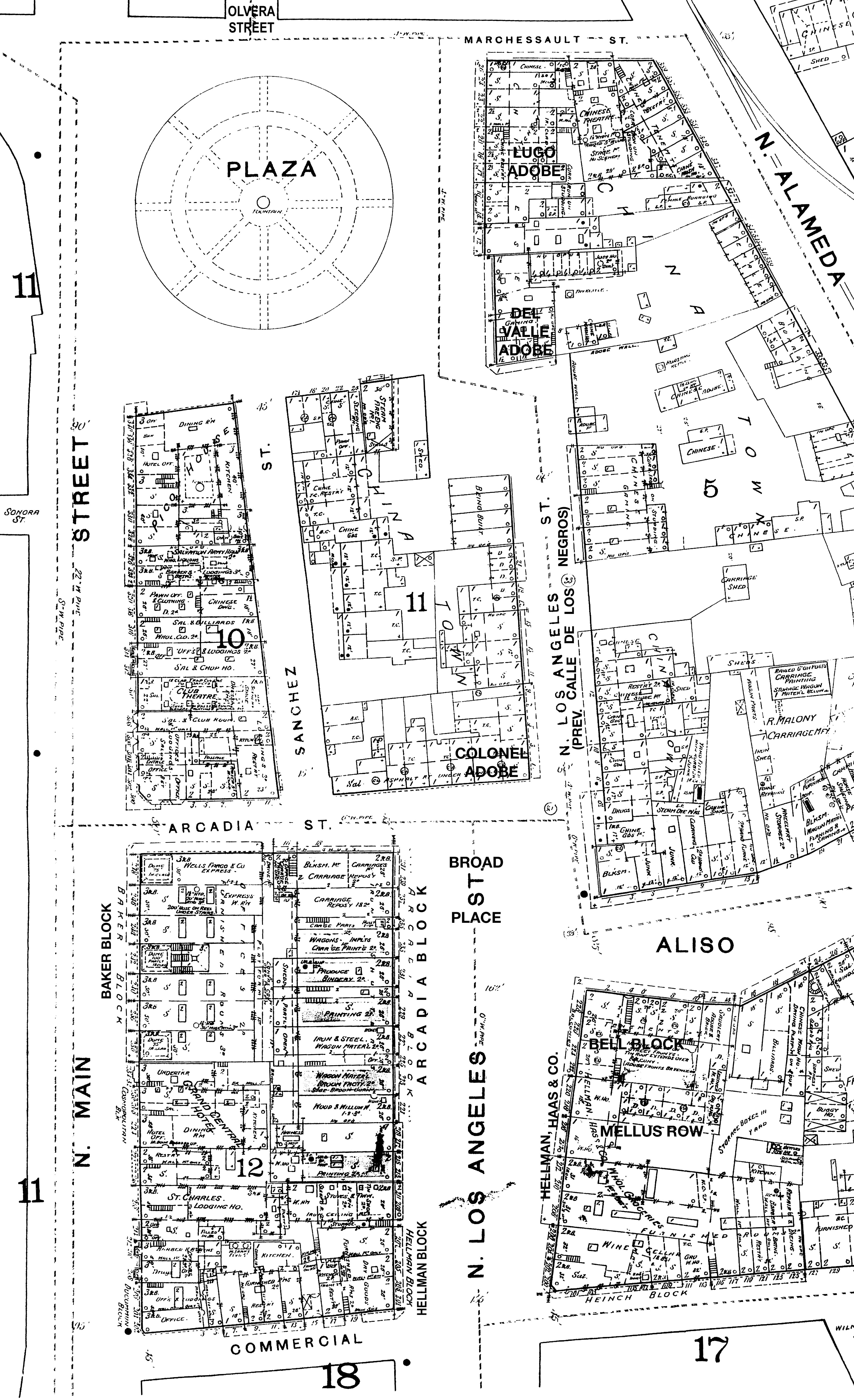
In 1888, Calle de los Negros had just been renamed, and here is marked Los Angeles Street (only the section from Arcadia to the Plaza). In that same year, but not yet reflected on the map, the Coronel Adobe would be removed to allow Los Angeles Street to continue straight north to the Plaza from Broad Place.

The Coronel Adobe was demolished in 1888 and 1896 Sanborn maps show that the Del Valle adobe had been removed, and Los Angeles Street had been extended to form the eastern edge of the Plaza, thus passing in front of the Lugo Adobe. Calle de los Negros remained for a few more decades, behind a row of houses lining the east side of Los Angeles Street between Arcadia and Aliso streets. This was also the western edge of Old Chinatown from around the 1880s through 1930s. It reached eastward across Alameda St. to cover most of the area that is now Union Station. It proceeded one more block past the Plaza, with the buildings on the east side of Olvera Street forming its western edge, until terminating at Alameda Street.

===== Eastern edge of Plaza =====
Since the early 1950s, Los Angeles Street has formed the eastern edge of the Plaza, but the buildings lining its eastern edge, including the Lugo Adobe, were removed. The site is now Father Serra Park.

===== From the Plaza north to Alameda =====
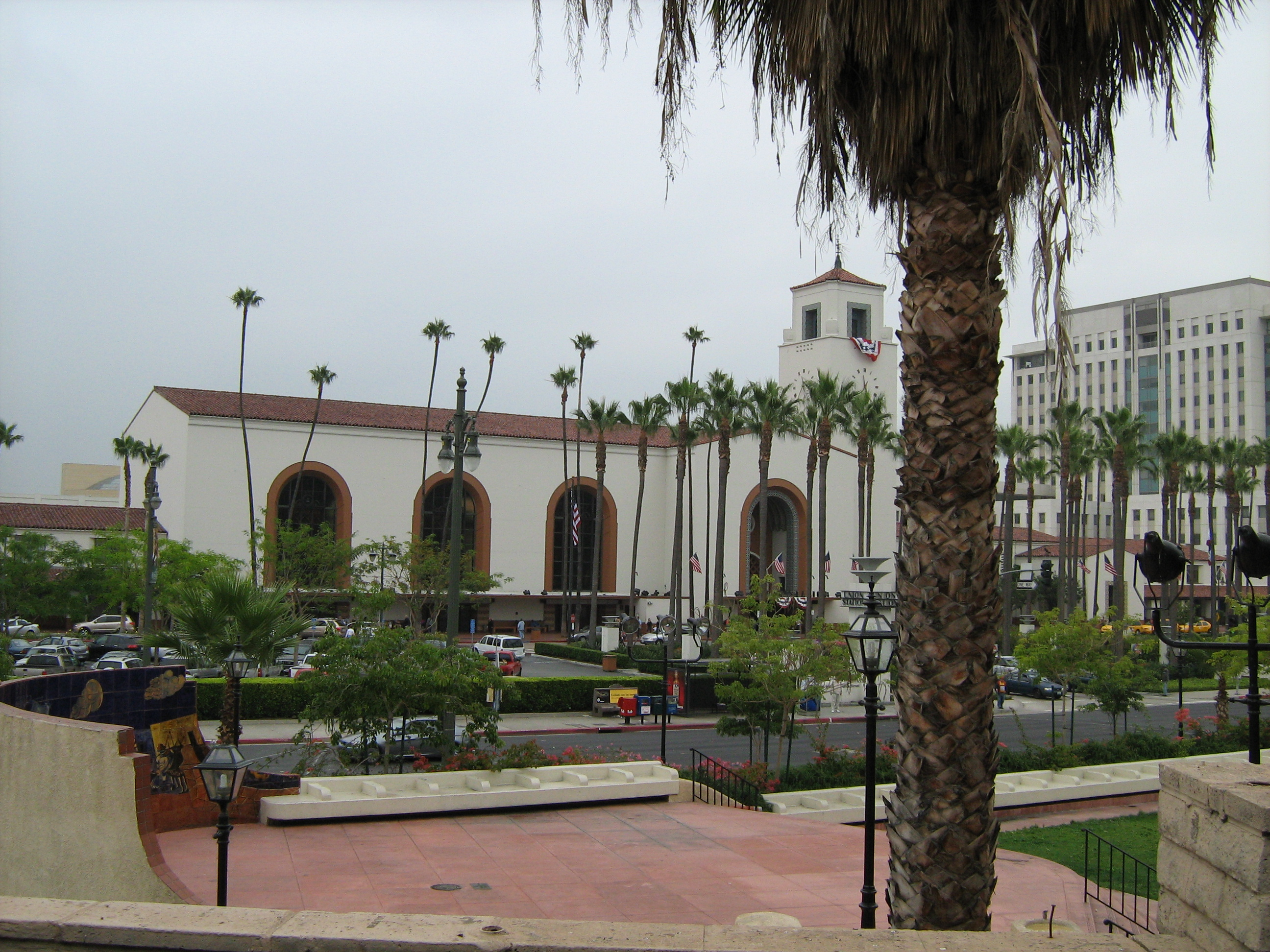
Placita Dolores, where from 1888 until the 1950s, Los Angeles Street used to run a short block north of the Plaza to terminate at Alameda St.

When it was extended past the Plaza in 1888, Los Angeles Street terminated one short block north of the Plaza at Alameda Street. Now, Los Angeles Street turns east at the north side of the Plaza to terminate at Alameda Street at a right angle, directly across from the Union Station complex. What was the short block of Los Angeles Street north of the Plaza is now part of Placita Dolores, a small open plaza which surrounds a statue of Mexican charro entertainer Antonio Aguilar on horseback.

==== Calle de los Negros ====
Until the late 19th century, Los Angeles Street did not form the east side of the Plaza; it ran south only from Broad Place at the intersection of Arcadia Street. Here, the Coronel Adobe blocked the path north one block to the Plaza, but just slightly to the right (east) of the path of Los Angeles Street was Calle de los Negros (Spanish-language name; marked on post-1847 maps as Negro Alley or Nigger Alley), a narrow, one-block north–south street likely named after darker-skinned Mexican afromestizo and/or mulatto residents during the Spanish colonial era.. At the north end of Calle de los Negros stood the Del Valle adobe (also known as the Matthias or Matteo Sabichi house), at the southern edge of which one could turn left and enter the plaza at its southeast corner. Calle de los Negros was famous for its saloons and violence in the early days of the town, and by the 1880s was considered part of Chinatown, lined with Chinese and Chinese American residences, businesses and gambling dens.

The neglected dirt alley was already associated with vice by the early 1850s, when a bordello and its owner both known as La Prietita (the dark-skinned lady) were active here. Its other businesses included malodorous livery stables, a pawn shop, a saloon, a theater and a connected restaurant. Historian James Miller Guinn wrote in 1896, "in the flush days of gold mining, from 1850 to 1856, it was the wickedest street on earth...In length it did not exceed 500 feet, but in wickedness, it was unlimited. On either side it was lined with saloons, gambling hells, dance houses and disreputable dives. It was a cosmopolitan street. Representatives of different races and many nations frequented it. Here the ignoble red man, crazed with aguardiente, fought his battles, the swarthy Sonorian plied his stealthy dagger, and the click of the revolver mingled with the clink of gold at the gaming table when some chivalric American felt that his word of “honah” had been impugned."

By 1871, the alley was notorious as a "racially, spatially, and morally disorderly place", according to historian César López. It was here that a growing number of Chinese immigrant railroad laborers settled after the completion of the transcontinental railroad in 1869. There, William Estrada notes, the "Chinese of Los Angeles came to fill an important sector of the economy as entrepreneurs. Some became proprietors and employees of small hand laundries and restaurants; some were farmers and wholesale produce peddlers; others ran gambling establishments; and some occupied other areas left vacant by the absence of workers in the gold rush migration to California." The Chinese population increased from 14 in 1860 to almost 200 by 1870. Guinn stated that the alley stayed "wicked" through and after its transition to the city's Old Chinatown.

Calle de los Negros was reconfigured in 1888 when Los Angeles Street was extended north, with a small, shallow row of houses remaining between the new section of Los Angeles street's eastern edge and the western edge of the new, shortened alley. The site of Calle de los Negros is now the Pueblo parking lot and a cloverleaf-style entrance to the US 101 freeway.

==== Coronel Adobe ====
The Coronel Adobe was built in 1840 by Ygnacio Coronel as a family home. It stood at the northwest corner of Arcadia Street and Calle de los Negros; Los Angeles Street terminated at its southern end. The area gradually became an area for gambling and saloons, and upper-class families left to live elsewhere. Around 1849, they sold the house to a "sporting fraternity", which operated a popular 24-hour gambling establishment with games including monte, faro, and poker; up to $200,000 in gold could be seen on the tables at a time. Arguments ensued and murders were frequent. The building later became a dance hall where "lewd women" were employed, aimed at the Mexican-American population. After that, still in the 1850s, it became a grocery and dry goods store (Corbett & Barker), then a storage house for iron and hard lumber for Harris Newmark Co. It was then leased to a Chinese immigrant. In 1871, it was the site of the Chinese massacre of 1871. The Adobe was torn down in 1888 in order to extend Los Angeles Street north past the Plaza.

==== Garnier Building ====
At 419 N. Los Angeles Street, at the northwest corner of Arcadia, is the Garnier Building, built in 1890, part of the Los Angeles' original Chinatown. The southern portion of the building was demolished in the 1950s to make way for the Hollywood Freeway. The Chinese American Museum is now located in the Garnier Building. It should not be confused with another Garnier Block/Building on Main St. a block away now commonly known as Plaza House.

=== Historical Mural painting ===
Various historical events of Los Angeles are depicted in a colourful trompe-l'œil mural painting.

== Part of historic trails ==
=== Juan Bautista de Anza National Historic Trail ===
The Pueblo de Los Ángeles is participating site of the Juan Bautista de Anza National Historic Trail, a National Park Service area in the United States National Trails System. A driving tour map and list of sites by County can be used to follow the trail.

=== Old Spanish National Historic Trail ===
The Pueblo de Los Ángeles was the final destination of the Old Spanish Trail. It is a site on the Old Spanish National Historic Trail, which was established in 2002. Museums, historic sites, and markers along the Old Spanish Trail identify sites from Santa Fe to Los Angeles. The visitor center of the Avila Adobe offers a National Park Passport Stamp for the trail.

== Historic map ==
Below is a map of the Plaza area with streets and monuments marked as they appeared in the 1880s.

==== Abbreviations and notes ====
- d = demolished
- Italics indicate buildings or streets that no longer exist
- "Female boarding" was a euphemism for small rooms, "cribs", used by prostitutes.

CALLE CORTA/SHORT/ BELLEVUE/ SUNSET
now CÉSAR CHÁVEZ AVE

616–620
pre-1890: #16–20 Sentous Block
1886–1950s/
now parking lot

600–8
Chester House
lodgings p1906
now parking lot

M
A
I
N

S
T
R
E
E
T
former MACY ST.
former MACY ST.
A
L
A
M
E
D
A

S
T
R
E
E
T
former MACY ST.
UPPER MAIN ST.—>
a.k.a.
SAN FERNANDO ST.
a.k.a.
NORTH SPRING ST.

17
Pelanconi House 1850s–pres

La Golondrina restaurant 1924–pres

V
I
N
E
or
W
I
N
E

since
1877
O
L
V
E
R
A

12
Sepúlveda House 1887–pres

10
ÁVILA ADOBE 1818–pres
oldest house in Los Angeles

Plaza Substation 1905-pres

Olvera House 19th c.–pres

115 E
pre-1890: #99–#115
Agustín Olvera adobe
"Chinese quarters" p1888
Methodist Church 1926

125 E
Eugene Biscailuz Bldg 1926–pres

L
O
S

A
N
G
E
L
E
S

S
T.

1888–
1950s

Pironi & Slatri wine & brandy vaults & distillery p1888

813–23
"Female Boarding" p1906
now Placita Dolores park

L. A. City Water Co.
now Placita Dolores park

850

Institución Caritativa/
Orphan Asylum 1852–91/
Lumber yard & mill p1906/
now Mozaic Apts

former APABLAZA ST.

OLD CHINATOWN
19th c.–1930s d/
UNION STATION
1939–pres

BREAD/CHURCH/MARCHESSAULT/SUNSET
now PASEO LUIS OLIVARES

former MARCHESSAULT ST.
now PASEO DE LA PLAZA (pedestrian)

former MARCHESSAULT
now LOS ANGELES ST.

former MARCHESSAULT
now station driveway

525–41
1814/1861–pres:
OUR LADY QUEEN OF THE ANGELS CHURCH

L. A. Gas Light Co.
gas plant 1867-?

507–11N
House of Pío Pico
1814/1861–pres GARNIER BLOCK
a.k.a. Plaza House
p1888 Plaza Hotel
p1955 County offices
2011–pres La Plaza de Cultura y Artes

501–5
House of Jesús Domínguez
1888–pres Vickrey-Brunswig Bldg
p1955 County offices
2011–pres La Plaza de Cultura y Artes

LOS ANGELES PLAZA

This block: "Chinese businesses" p1888

Ascensión Jerelna res. 1854-?

Ascensión Navarro res. 1855-?

510–526
VICENTE LUGO ADOBE 1840s-1951d

c.504–8
Ignacio Del Valle adobe 1858-1880s

now Yaanga Park

"Chinese
theater"
p1888–1906

757–767
"Chinese
tenements"
p1888–1906

745–753
"Female
boarding"
p1888–1906

OLD CHINATOWN
19th c.–1930s d/
UNION STATION
1939–pres

ex-BRIDGE ST. 1850s/ HAYES ALLEY/ SONORA ST./ REPUBLIC ST.

former REPUBLIC/PLAZA ST.
now PASEO DE LA PLAZA (pedestrian)

former FERGUSON ALLEY c.1888–c.1951

former SHAFER ST.

411–427
pre-1890 numbering 291–305
1853 Hayes adobe, Jail
p1870s Felix Signoret Bldg
p1853 Montgomery House gambling saloon
p1888 Hotel Oxford
hotel p1894, p1906 Hoffman House
now parking lot

late 19th c. Russian Baths

369–75
pre-1890: #275–9
p1884–92:
California Stables

424–440
Carrillo House 1821-1869d/
PICO HOUSE 1869/70–pres
National Hotel p1894–1906

418–422
Merced Theater 1870–pres It
theater 1871–7
part of National Hotel p1894–1906

412
Firehouse p1894

Nick Covarrubias livery stable p1881

R. M. Baker Bldg p1881–d
now Hollywood Fwy

S
Á
N
C
H
E
Z

501
p1853: Ocampo Plaza
1884–pres: Old Plaza Firehouse

res p1853: Leandro Ocampo
1884–pres: Old Plaza Firehouse

425
p1906 d Opium joint
now part of Chinese American Museum

409–23
1890–pres Phillipe Garnier Bldg
p1894–1906 "Chinese stores, tenements"
now Chinese American Museum

401–7
1840-1888 Coronel Adobe/
p1894 Jeanette Block
p1894 Hotel Lion D'Or

L
O
S

A
N
G
E
L
E
S

S
T.

CALLE DE LOS NEGROS
site of Chinese Massacre 1871

Juan Apaplaza res 1855-?

Serafina Uriba res 1855-?

José Vic. Guerrero res 1855-?

José Sepúlveda res 1855-?

"Chinese gaming" p1888

"Chinese quarters" p1894

400–6
201–9 E. Aliso
Wilcox Block c.1889/93–?
Hotel de Grenoble p1906

211–9 E. Aliso
Beaudry's Block,
Au Gamin De Paris p1862
Hotel De Gap p1906

now parking lot and freeway onramp

B
A
U
E
R

A
L.

711–31 rear
p1894:
"Female
boarding"

701–7
p1888:
Italian
Hotel
p1894:
Café des Alpes

CAMINO PARA SAN GABRIEL 1850s/ ALISO ST. now Arcadia St & U. S. 101

"Female Boarding"

Hotel de France

now UNION STATION

now Hollywood Freeway (US 101)

ARCADIA ST.

BROAD PLACE 1850s–1888
Frémont's Troops
now Arcadia St. & U. S. 101

for the area to the south, see Victorian Downtown Los Angeles

== See also ==
- List of Registered Historic Places in Los Angeles
- History of Los Angeles
- Fort Moore Pioneer Memorial
- LA Plaza de Cultura y Artes
- Mariachi Plaza
- Pueblo de Los Angeles
