= Equestrian statue of Antonio Aguilar =

Equestrian statue in Los Angeles, California, U.S.

Coordinates: 34°3′24.2″N 118°14′15.9″W

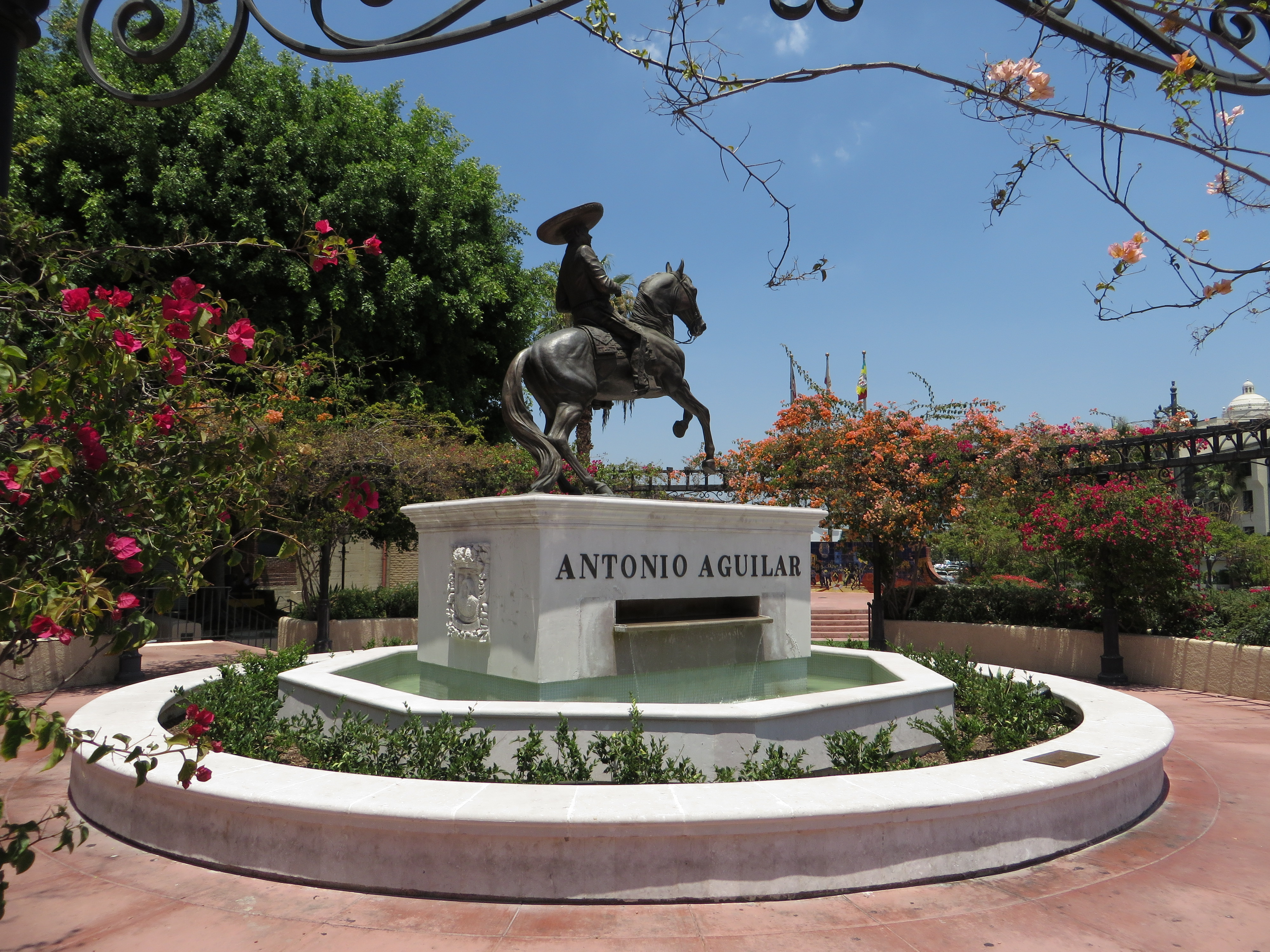
- Artist: Dan Medina
- Year: 2012
- Subject: Antonio Aguilar
- Location: Placita de Dolores, El Pueblo de Los Ángeles Historical Monument, Los Angeles, California

The equestrian statue of Antonio Aguilar, honoring Mexican singer and actor Antonio Aguilar, is installed in the Placita de Dolores, in Los Angeles, California. Located within El Pueblo de Los Ángeles Historical Monument, the statue is situated at the corner of Los Angeles Street and Alameda Street, in front of the city's Union Station.

== History ==
Sculpted by Dan Medina, the statue was erected in 2012 with the support of José Huizar, former Los Angeles City Councilmember, as well as the University of Guadalajara and the State of Zacatecas.
