= Statue of Charles III of Spain =

Sculpture in Los Angeles, California, U.S.

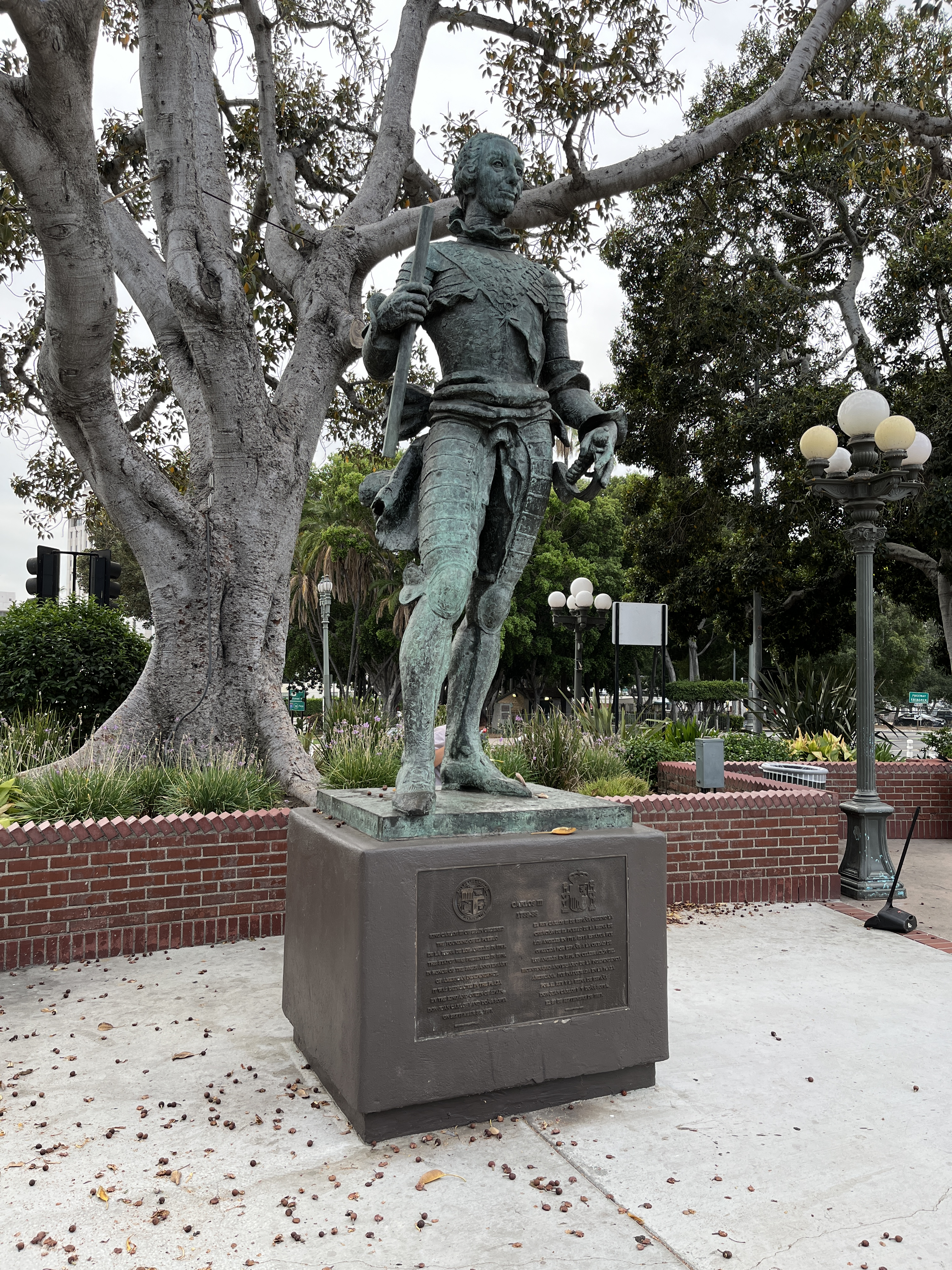
- The statue in 2022
- Subject: Charles III of Spain
- Location: Los Angeles, California, U.S.; 34°3′22.9″N 118°14′19.1″W

A statue of Charles III of Spain (also known as King Carlos III) is installed at Los Angeles Plaza Park in El Pueblo de Los Ángeles Historical Monument, Los Angeles, California. Previously, the statue was installed in MacArthur Park, in the city's Westlake neighborhood.
