= Fire Station No. 1 (Los Angeles, California) =

Historic fire station in Los Angeles, United States

LAFD Fire Station No. 1
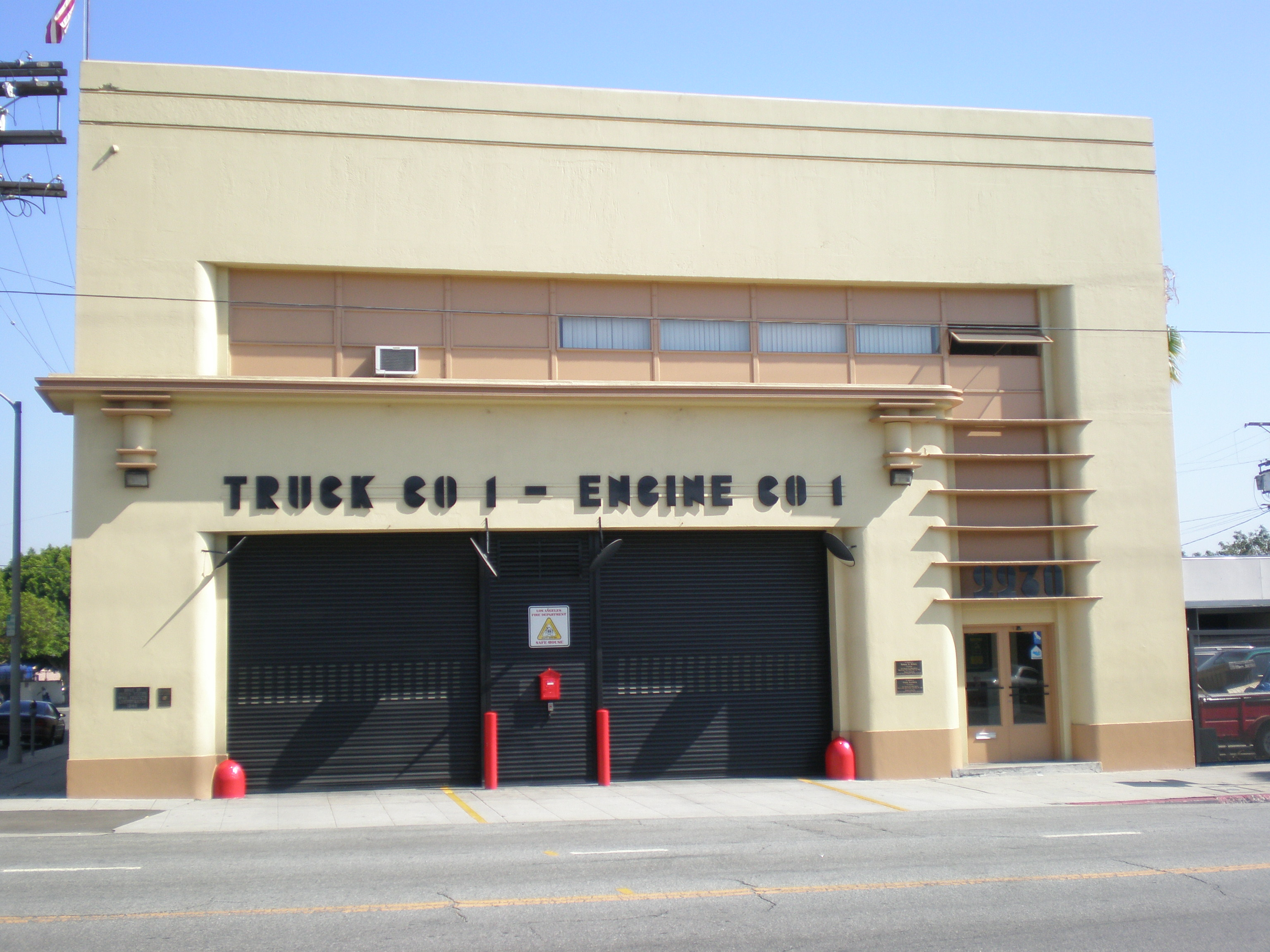
- LAFD Station 1 in 2009

- Location within the Los Angeles metropolitan area Location within California Location within the United States
- 34°4′31″N 118°13′06″W
- Location: 2230 Pasadena Ave., Lincoln Heights, Los Angeles

History
- Built: March 6, 1941

Site notes
- Architect(s): P. K. Schabarum; Charles O. Brittain
- Architectural style: Streamline Moderne
- Owner: Los Angeles Fire Department

Los Angeles Historic-Cultural Monument
- Designated: July 7, 1976
- Reference no.: 156

Los Angeles Fire Department Station No. 1 was built in 1941. The Streamline Moderne station located at 2230 Pasadena Avenue, Lincoln Heights, Los Angeles, replaced an older station, 3 blocks west of its current location. Built in 1887, the original station was the city of Los Angeles' first professional, full-time fire station. The former station's plot of land at Pasadena Ave & North Avenue 19 now houses the LAFD's supply and maintenance yard.

Built under the auspices of the Works Progress Administration, the new 6,534 sq ft station was built at a cost of $65,000.00 USD, with the city of Los Angeles responsible for $29,000.00 USD. P. K. Schabarum and Charles O. Brittain of the Los Angeles City Department of Construction were responsible for the station's design.

When the new station opened on March 6, 1941, the two-story, reinforced concrete structure housed Engine Company No. 1 and Truck Company No. 1, as well as serving as the headquarters for Battalion Chief 2.

The station was listed as Los Angeles Historic-Cultural Monument #156 on July 7, 1976.

== Engine Company No 1 ==
Prior to the establishment of the Los Angeles Fire Department, fires were fought by volunteer organizations established by various neighborhood groups.

One of the largest and most popular groups was The Original Thirty Eights, who held their own fund-raising events, and their activities were considered to be major civic events in the city.

In December 1885, the LA City Council passed Ordinance No. 205, establishing the Los Angeles Fire Department, and authorized the construction of 4 new fire stations. When Ordinance 205 went into effect in 1886, 31 volunteer firefighters from 4 existing volunteer companies became LA's first professional firemen, including members of the 38s, then based at Plaza Station in the historical Los Angeles Plaza.

The 38s would disband and become LAFD's Engine Company Number 1, moving into Fire Station No 1 across the river at 1901 Pasadena Avenue in 1888. From 1899 to 1909, the LAPD also used part of the property as a jail prior to the construction of Lincoln Heights Jail, built up the street from Station No 1 in 1927. 1913 saw the transition from horse drawn apparatus to LAFD's first motorized apparatus, a Gorham Seagrave Auto-Pumper. By 1929, the old station had outlived its usefulness and City Council sought funding to build a new modern station, but with the Great Depression in full swing, couldn't justify the expense of new construction until 1940.

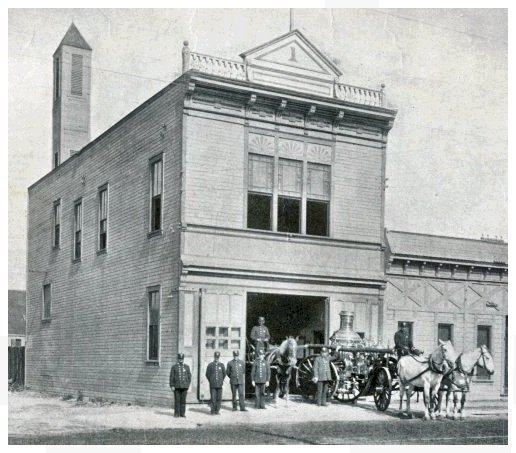
Station No. 1 in 1900

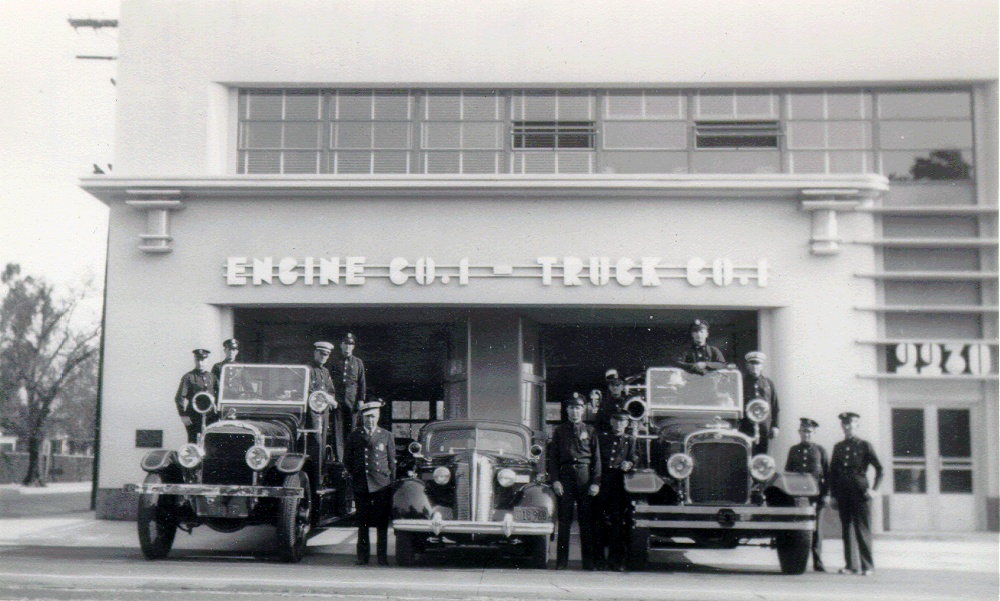
The new Station No. 1 in 1946

== See also ==
- Los Angeles Fire Department
- Los Angeles Fire Department Museum and Memorial
- Fire Station No. 14 (Los Angeles)
- Frank Hotchkin Memorial Training Center
- Old Plaza Firehouse
- List of Art Deco architecture in California
