= Stanford Fire Truck House =

Building in California, United States

Coordinates: 37.425066°N 122.171667°W

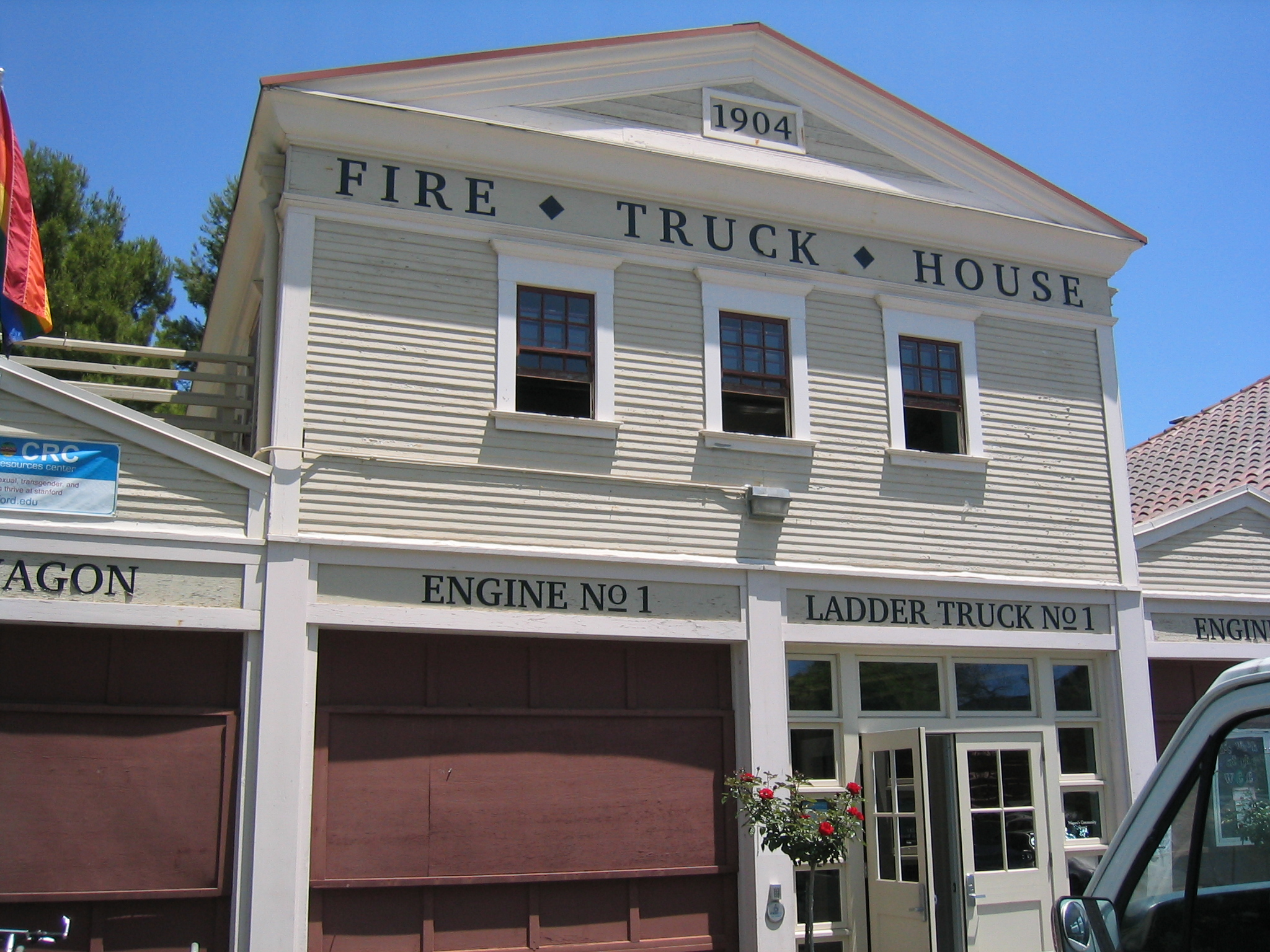
Fire Truck House

The Fire Truck House, built by Charles Hodges in 1904, served as Stanford University's firehouse until the early 1970s, when the current firehouse was built on Serra Street. It was staffed by a mix of students and professional firefighters. The students received room, board, and a stipend. A few later made firefighting a career, including William R. Bamattre, Chief of the Los Angeles City Fire Department from 1996 to 2007, and Nick Marinaro, Chief of Palo Alto Fire Department from 2004 to 2010.

Today, the Fire Truck House houses student campus organizations, including the Women's Community Center, which promotes the success of Stanford women by providing opportunities for scholarship, leadership, and activism, on the first floor, and the LGBT-CRC (Lesbian, Gay, Bisexual, Transgender Community Resources Center), which organizes diversity awareness programs and offers mentoring support for queer, questioning, and allied students.
