= Los Angeles Fire Department Museum and Memorial =

- Engine Co. No. 27
- U.S. National Register of Historic Places
- Los Angeles Historic-Cultural Monument
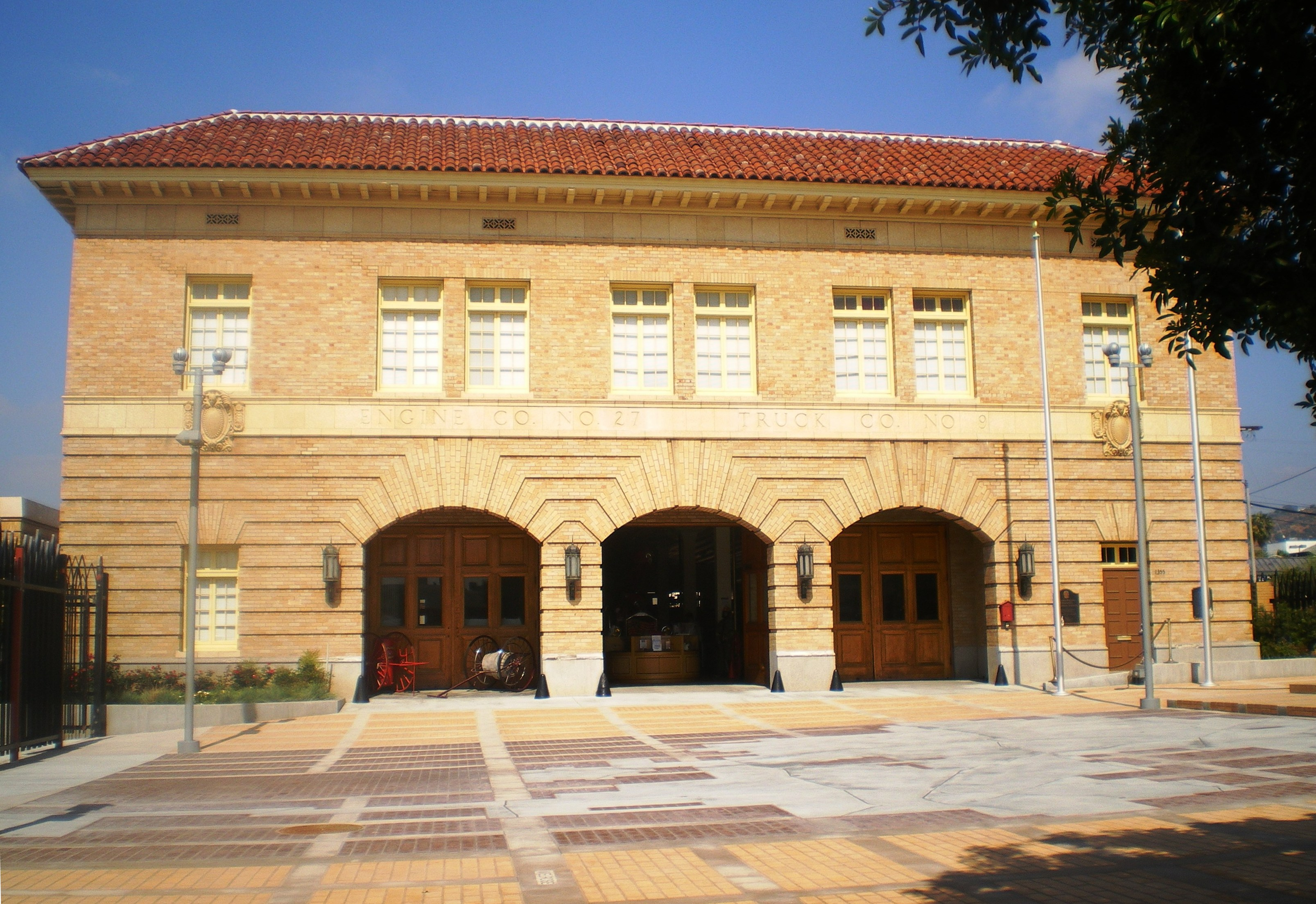
- Engine Co. No. 27, home of the Fire Dept. Museum
- Location: 1355 N. Cahuenga Boulevard, Hollywood, Los Angeles, California
- Coordinates: 34°5′45.4″N 118°19′48″W
- Built: 1930
- Architect: Peter K. Schabarum
- Architectural style: Late 19th And 20th Century Revivals
- NRHP reference No.: 85002559
- LAHCM No.: 165

Significant dates
- Added to NRHP: September 24, 1985
- Designated LAHCM: August 6, 1962

The Los Angeles Fire Department Museum and Memorial is located at Old Engine Co. No. 27, also known as Fire Station No. 27, on Cahuenga Boulevard in Hollywood. The museum houses old fire engines and fire apparatus, some dating from the 1880s. The museum also houses a reference library and fire safety learning center. The building was named a Los Angeles Cultural-Heritage Monument in 1976 and was listed in the National Register of Historic Places in 1985. The Fallen Firefighters Memorial in front of the station consists of a memorial wall listing all of the Los Angeles firefighters who have died in the line of duty and five life-size statues of firefighters.

== History of Engine Co. No. 27 ==
At 20,000 square feet (1,900 m^{2}), the Italian Renaissance revival building housing Engine Co. No. 27 was the largest fire station west of the Mississippi River when it opened in July 1930. For more than 60 years, the old fire station served the Hollywood community, including the motion picture studios and the stars who lived in the Hollywood Hills. It was also used a movie location by, among others, The Three Stooges and Buster Keaton. The use of the building as both a movie location and a working fire station sometimes led to difficulties. In 1937, a real fire broke out while a Hollywood studio was filming the motion picture, Two Platoons, at Fire Station No. 27. The Los Angeles Times reported on the incident this way:

The entire crew was on hand as atmosphere and the equipment served as a background. Dick Foran and Robert Armstrong were in the middle of a scene when the alarm sounded. Moviemaking meant nothing in the life of Battalion Chief Rothermel at that moment. Before (director John) Farrow could finish the sequence, the fire engines were speeding on their way to a brush fire in the Hollywood Hills. The movie company had to wait an hour before action could be resumed.

In 1950, the captain of Engine Co. No. 27, Michael J. Carter, died in the line of duty while supervising a firefighting effort at a recordmaking facility in Hollywood. Capt. Carter is one of the fallen firefighters now honored by the memorial located in front of Engine Co. No. 27.

One firefighter, Lawrence T. O'Neill, served at Station 27 for 34 years starting in 1929. At the time of his retirement in 1963, O'Neill recalled the company's efforts in fighting the Paramount sound stage fire in 1929, the Consolidated Laboratories fire the same year, and dozens of other fires over the years.

In 1966, at the station, the Beach Boys filmed the music video for "Good Vibrations".

In 1976, an interagency dispute arose, as the Fire Department Board of Commissioners voted unanimously to oppose the designation of Station No. 27 as a Historic-Cultural Monument by the City's Cultural Heritage Commission. Fire Chief Kenneth Long expressed concerns that the designation would make it impossible for the city to rebuild the station or to sell it to build a new station elsewhere. Despite the fire department's opposition, Fire Station No. 27 was disengaged as the city's Cultural-Historical Monument #165 in October 1976. The historic designation saved Engine Co. No. 27 when the Los Angeles Fire Department announced plans in 1984 to demolish 16 old fire stations as part of the largest building program ever undertaken by the department.

The station was also listed in the National Register of Historic Places in 1985. Rather than demolishing the old firehouse, a new fire station was built next door. The building was damaged in the 1994 Northridge earthquake, but was restored to its earlier appearance for use as a museum honoring the Los Angeles Fire Department.

== Los Angeles Fire Department Museum ==
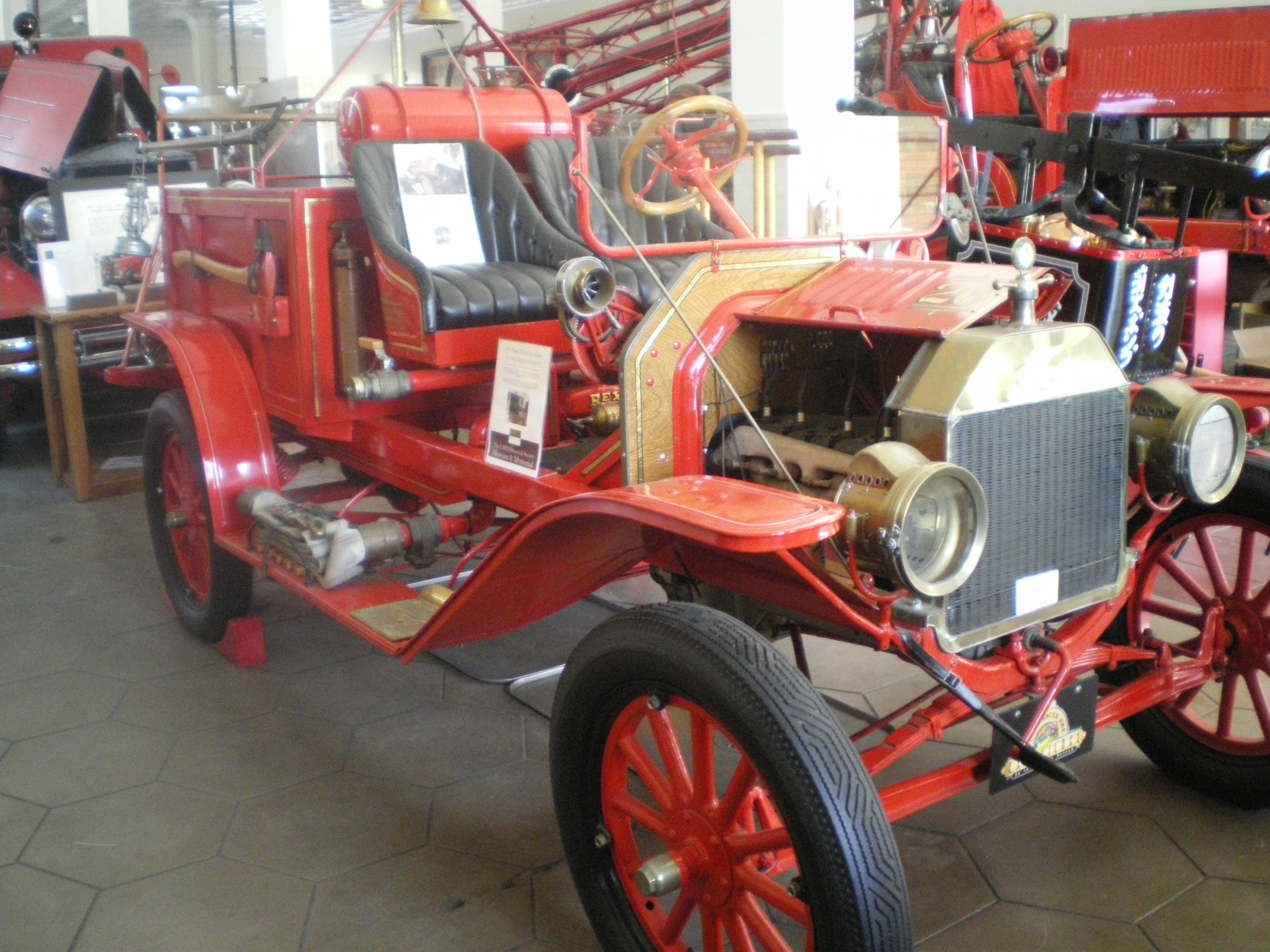
Model T fire engine on display at museum

The Los Angeles Fire Department Museum opened in October 2001—the month after the September 11 attacks on the World Trade Center in New York City, New York, and the Pentagon in Arlington County, Virginia. The walls of the museum are filled with historical photographs on the department's history. The museum houses several old fire engines, artifacts and historical firefighting equipment, some dating from the 1880s. There is also a research library and a learning center where fire and life safety lessons are taught. The benefactor of the museum is retired Los Angeles firefighter and Medal of Valor recipient, William Rolland. Rolland said of the museum: "I believe we must begin by educating our youth. A museum is not something you finish; museums are something you start. We will teach and educate children and their parents in fire safety awareness, emergency procedures and EMS technology of today."

When the Los Angeles Times published an article on the museum in 2003, it wrote: "With its high ceilings, six old-fashioned brass fire poles and nearly a dozen antique fire engines, the Los Angeles Fire Department Museum looks like a set from a Hollywood back lot. ... But Fire Station 27 has a greater purpose: keeping the flame of L.A. Fire Department history."

The Los Angeles Fire Department Historical Society also operates three other museums—the Los Angeles Harbor Fire Museum, located at 638 Beacon St., San Pedro; the Plaza Fire House near Olvera Street in downtown Los Angeles; and the African American Fire Fighter Museum, located at 1401 S. Central Avenue.

== Fallen Firefighters Memorial ==
In front of the museum is the Fallen Firefighter Memorial. It includes a memorial wall with the names of every known Los Angeles firefighter who has died while on active duty. The memorial also includes a series of life-size bronze statues depicting five firefighters. Two of the firefighters are depicted attacking a fire, while a fallen firefighter is attended to by a fourth figure. The fifth figure is the fire captain, shown making a command decision and also caring for the downed firefighter. The statues was based on a concept and designed by Los Angeles Fire Captain Harold Dwayne Golden and created in Minnesota by Honors for Excellence.

In 2005, firefighters staged a torch relay through the city to raise funds for the memorial that was then anticipated to cost $1.5 million. Each battalion in the Los Angeles Fire Department took turns running 13 miles (21 km) with the torch. At the time, firefighter Dominic Pascal said, "You don't want to forget your family members, and we don't want to forget ours. ... It's a significant, emotional event when you lose someone in a fire."

== See also ==
- Los Angeles Historic-Cultural Monuments in Hollywood
- List of Registered Historic Places in Los Angeles
- Los Angeles Fire Department
- Fire Station No. 14 (Los Angeles, California), NRHP-listed, historic all-black segregated fire station in South Los Angeles
- Fire Station No. 23 (Los Angeles, California), NRHP-listed, built in 1910 in Downtown Los Angeles
- Engine House No. 18 (Los Angeles, California), NRHP-listed, Mission Revival fire station built in 1904 in West Adams district
- Engine Company No. 28, NRHP-listed fire station in Downtown Los Angeles built in 1912
- Fire Station No. 30, Engine Company No. 30, NRHP-listed, historic all-black segregated fire station and engine company in South Los Angeles
- 'Ralph J. Scott, 100-foot fireboat built in 1925 and attached to the Los Angeles Fire Department, designated as a National Historic Landmark
