= Engine House No. 18 (Los Angeles, California) =

- U.S. National Register of Historic Places
- Los Angeles Historic-Cultural Monument
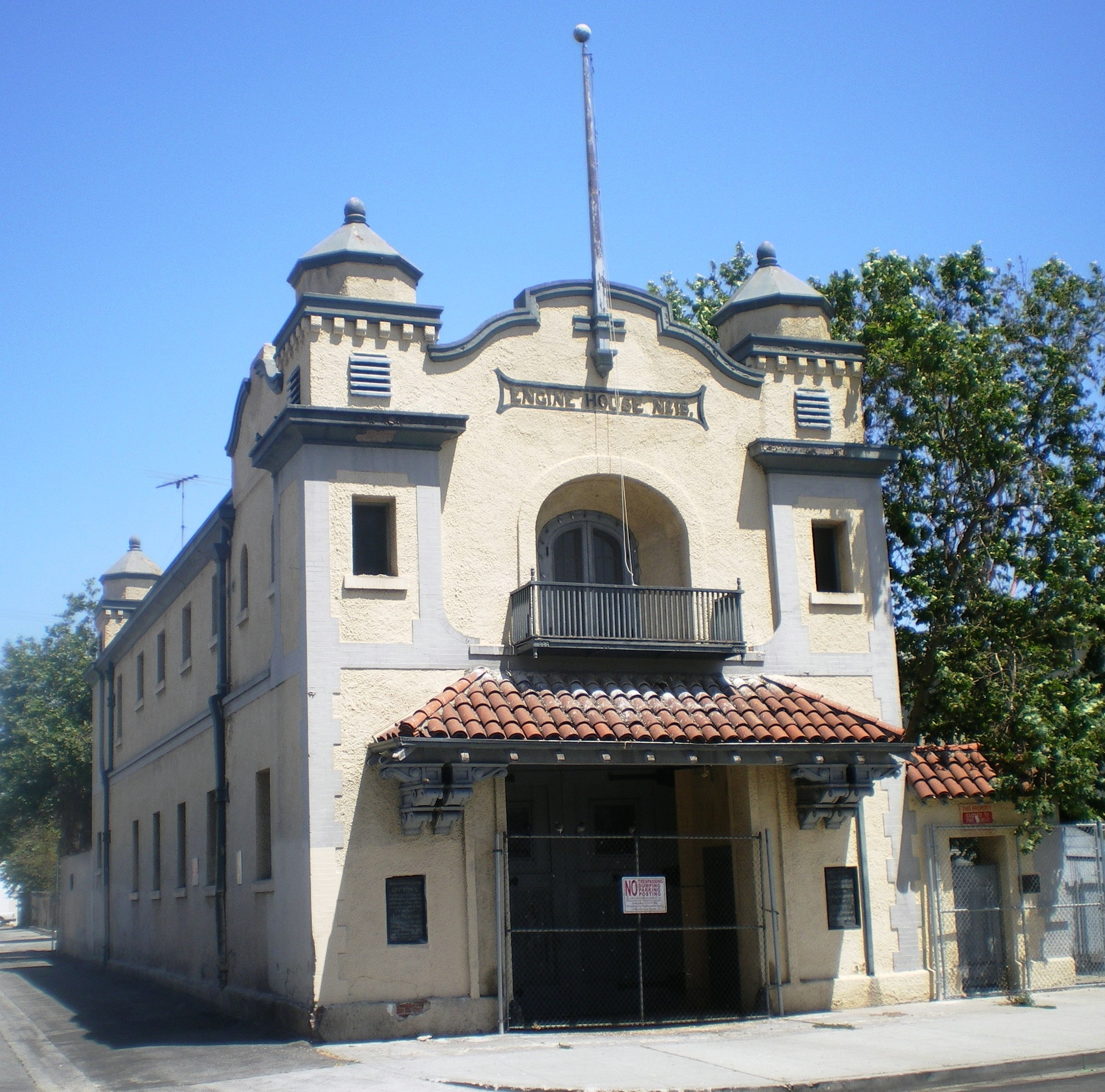
- Engine House No. 18 in 2008

- Location within the Los Angeles metropolitan area Location within California Location within the United States
- Location: 2616 S. Hobart Boulevard, Los Angeles, California
- Coordinates: 34°1′56″N 118°18′24″W
- Built: 1904
- Architects: John Parkinson; Henry R. Angelo
- Architectural style: Mission Revival, Spanish Revival
- NRHP reference No.: 82000968
- LAHCM No.: 349

Significant dates
- Added to NRHP: October 29, 1982
- Designated LAHCM: March 29, 1988

Engine House No. 18 is a fire station in the West Adams district of Los Angeles, California.

Built in 1904, the station was designed in the Mission Revival style by architect John Parkinson, whose later works included Los Angeles City Hall, Union Station, and Bullocks Wilshire. In 1915, Engine House No. 18 was one of a dozen stations closed because of budget cutbacks resulting from the "two-platoon ordinance" passed by the Los Angeles City Council in 1915. The station re-opened in 1920 and remained an operating fire station until 1968. In 1932, former fireman James F. Fourong was arrested for burglarizing Engine House No. 18. Fourong had looted other fire stations by phoning in false alarms and then entering the firehouse while the men responded to the call. In February 1932, Fourong attempted a robbery at Engine House No. 18 but was surprised by a fireman while burglarizing the lockers. After the building had been vacant for sixteen years, the Community Redevelopment Agency in 1984 agreed to a $28,000 contract with Woodford & Bernard, architects, to prepare construction documents for the restoration of Engine House No. 18. The plan was to restore and convert the firehouse into a community-oriented professional training center at a cost of $225,000.

Artist Wendell Collins provided art to the community from 1987 to 2004.

Through a competitive bidding process that began in December 2009, the Community Redevelopment Agency of the City of Los Angeles (CRA/LA) awarded the Exceptional Children's Foundation (ECF) the opportunity to purchase Engine House No. 18. ECF purchased the property in 2011 with the goal of converting the cultural landmark into a fine arts training center for adults with special needs and a community creative space for the residents of South Los Angeles.

Renovations of the site began in June 2012. ECF re-opened Engine House No. 18 as its South L.A. Art Center in the spring of 2013. Approximately 50 participants with developmental disabilities annually are provided with daily fine art instruction, life skills training, and case management services at this location. The center also hosts exhibits of the participants' artwork along with creations by other community artists.

== See also ==
- List of Registered Historic Places in Los Angeles
- List of Los Angeles Historic-Cultural Monuments in South Los Angeles
- Los Angeles Fire Department
- Los Angeles Fire Department Museum and Memorial
