= Los Angeles Fire Department =

American municipal fire department

Coordinates: 34°3′0″N 118°15′0″W

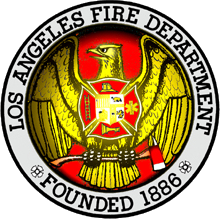
- Seal of the LAFD

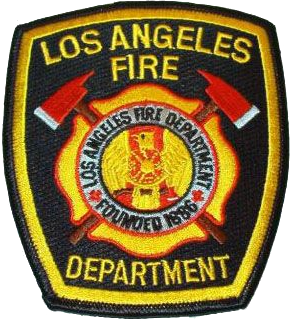
- Patch of the LAFD

Operational area
- Country: United States
- State: California
- County: Los Angeles
- City: Los Angeles

Agency overview
- Established: February 1, 1886; 140 years ago
- Annual calls: 470,000 (2021)
- Employees: 3,246 uniformed, 353 professional support (2024)
- Annual budget: $854,000,000 (2023–2024)
- Staffing: Career
- Commissioner: Genethia Hudley Hayes, president Sharon Delugach, vice president Corinne Tapia Babcock, commissioner Jimmy H. Hara, commissioner Jimmie Woods-Gray, commissioner
- Fire chief: Jaime Moore
- EMS level: Advanced life support & basic life support
- IAFF: IAFF Local 112
- Motto: "Serving with Courage, Integrity, and Pride"

Facilities and equipment
- Divisions: 4 Divisions
- Battalions: 14 Battalions
- Stations: 106 Firehouses
- Engines: 140 Engine Companies
- Trucks: 42 Truck Companies
- Rescues: 1 Heavy Rescue Unit
- Ambulances: 93 Advanced Life Support (ALS) Units & 43 Basic Life Support (BLS) Units
- Tenders: 2 Water Tender Units
- HAZMAT: 4 Hazardous Materials Units
- USAR: 6 Urban Search And Rescue Units
- Airport crash: 9 Crash Units
- Wildland: 6 Wildfire Engines
- Bulldozers: 2 Bulldozer Units
- Helicopters: 6 Helicopter Units
- Fireboats: 5 Fireboats

Website
- lafd.org
- uflac.org

The Los Angeles Fire Department (LAFD or LA City Fire) is the full-service fire department of the city of Los Angeles, California, United States, and of the city of San Fernando, California, United States, via contract.

The department provides fire suppression services, technical rescue services, emergency medical response services, and hazardous materials response services to the residents of the city of Los Angeles. The LAFD is responsible for approximately four million people who live in the agency's 471 square miles (1,220 km^{2}) jurisdiction. department was founded in 1886 and is the third-largest municipal fire department in the United States, after the New York City Fire Department and the Chicago Fire Department. The department is sometimes also referred to as the "Los Angeles City Fire Department" or "LA City Fire" to distinguish it from the Los Angeles County Fire Department, which serves unincorporated areas and, via contracts, other incorporated municipalities within Los Angeles County without their own fire departments.

The department is currently under the command of Jamie Moore, after former LAFD chief Kristin Crowley was fired by Los Angeles mayor Karen Bass following the 2025 Southern California wildfires for refusing to write an after-action report.

== History ==
The Los Angeles Fire Department has its origins in 1871. That September, George M. Fall, the county clerk for Los Angeles County, organized Engine Company No. 1. It was a volunteer firefighting force with an Amoskeag fire engine and a hose jumper (cart). The equipment was hand-drawn to fires. In the spring of 1874, the fire company asked the Los Angeles City Council to purchase horses to pull the engine. The council refused, and the fire company disbanded.

Many of the former members of Engine Company No. 1 reorganized under the name of Thirty-Eights No. 1 in May 1875, Engine Co. No. 2 was organized under the name Confidence Engine Company.

Los Angeles acquired its first "hook and ladder" truck for the Thirty-Eights. It proved to be too cumbersome and was ill-adapted to the needs of the city. It was sold to the city of Wilmington. In 1876, another hook and ladder truck was purchased, serving in the city until 1881.

In 1878, a third fire company was formed by the residents in the neighborhood of Sixth Street and Park. It was given the name "Park Hose Co. No. 1". East Los Angeles formed a hose company named "East Los Angeles Hose Co. No. 2" five years later. The final volunteer company was formed in the fall of 1883 in the Morris Vineyard area. This company was called "Morris Vineyard Hose Co. No.3."

All of these companies remained in service until February 1, 1886, when the present paid fire department came into existence.

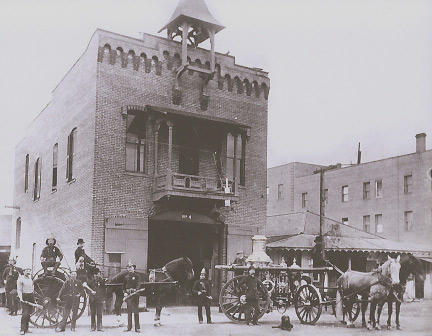
Los Angeles Fire House near Olvera Street, 1890

In 1877, the first horses were bought for the city fire department. It would continue to use horses for its equipment for almost fifty years, phasing out the last horse-drawn equipment on July 19, 1921.

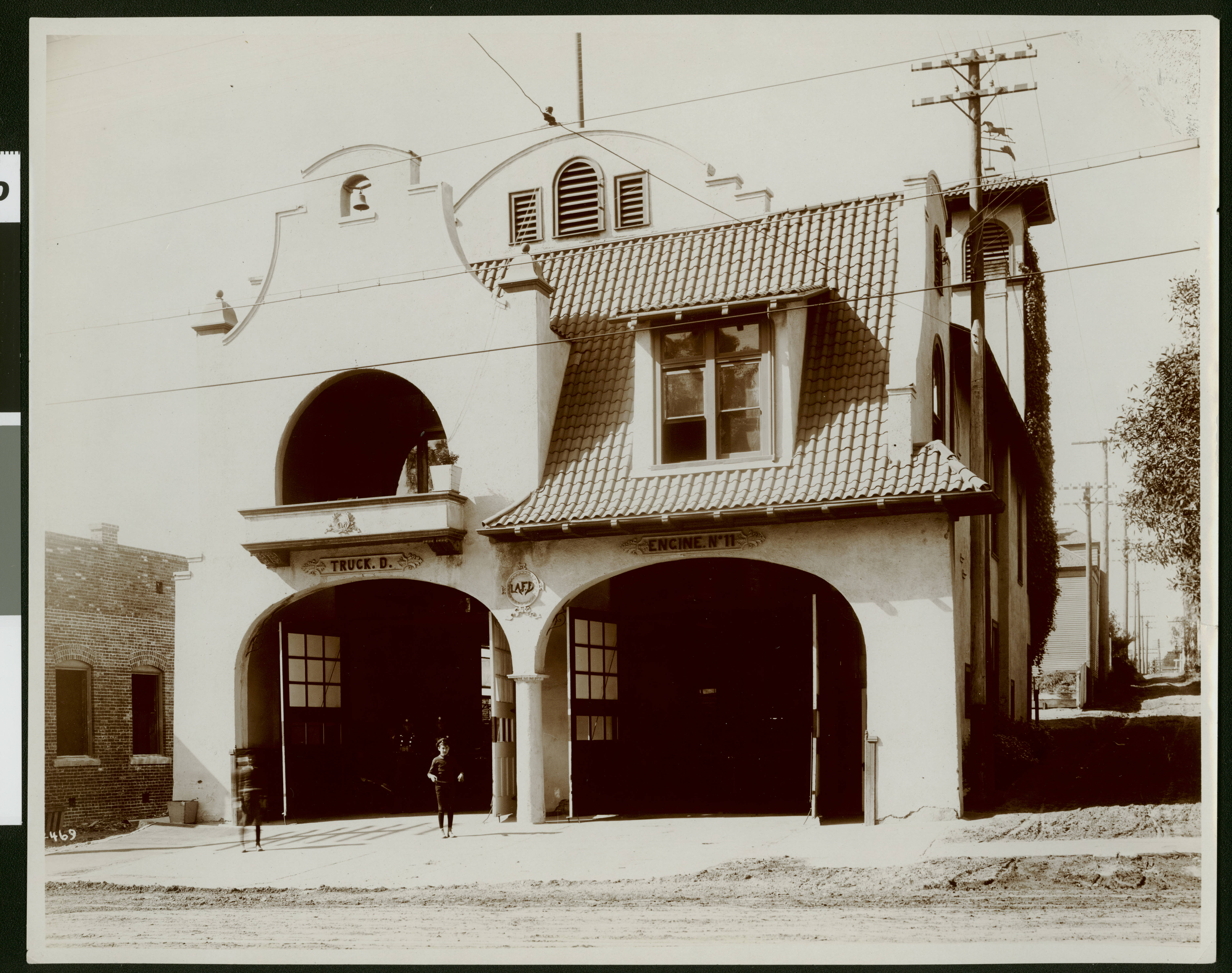
L.A.F.D. Engine No. 11 at 1819 West 7th Street, ca.1910

By 1900, the department had grown to 18 fire stations with 123 full-time paid firefighters and 80 fire horses. The city had also installed 194 fire-alarm boxes, allowing civilians to sound the alarm if a fire was spotted. 660 fire hydrants were placed throughout the city, giving firefighters access to a reliable water source.

In 1955, Station 78 in Studio City became the first racially integrated station in the department.

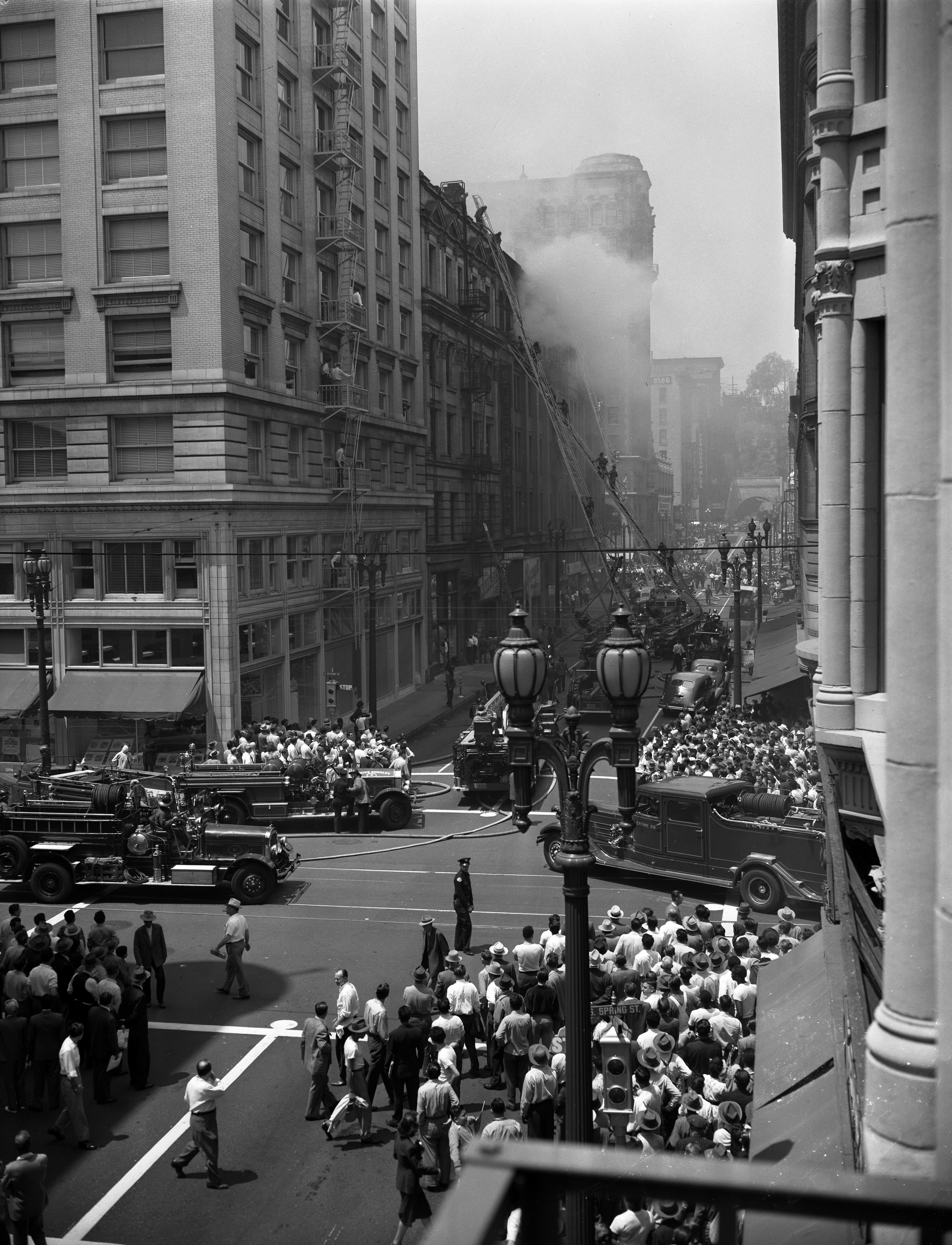
LAFD on the scene of a fire in the Bradbury Building, Downtown Los Angeles in 1947

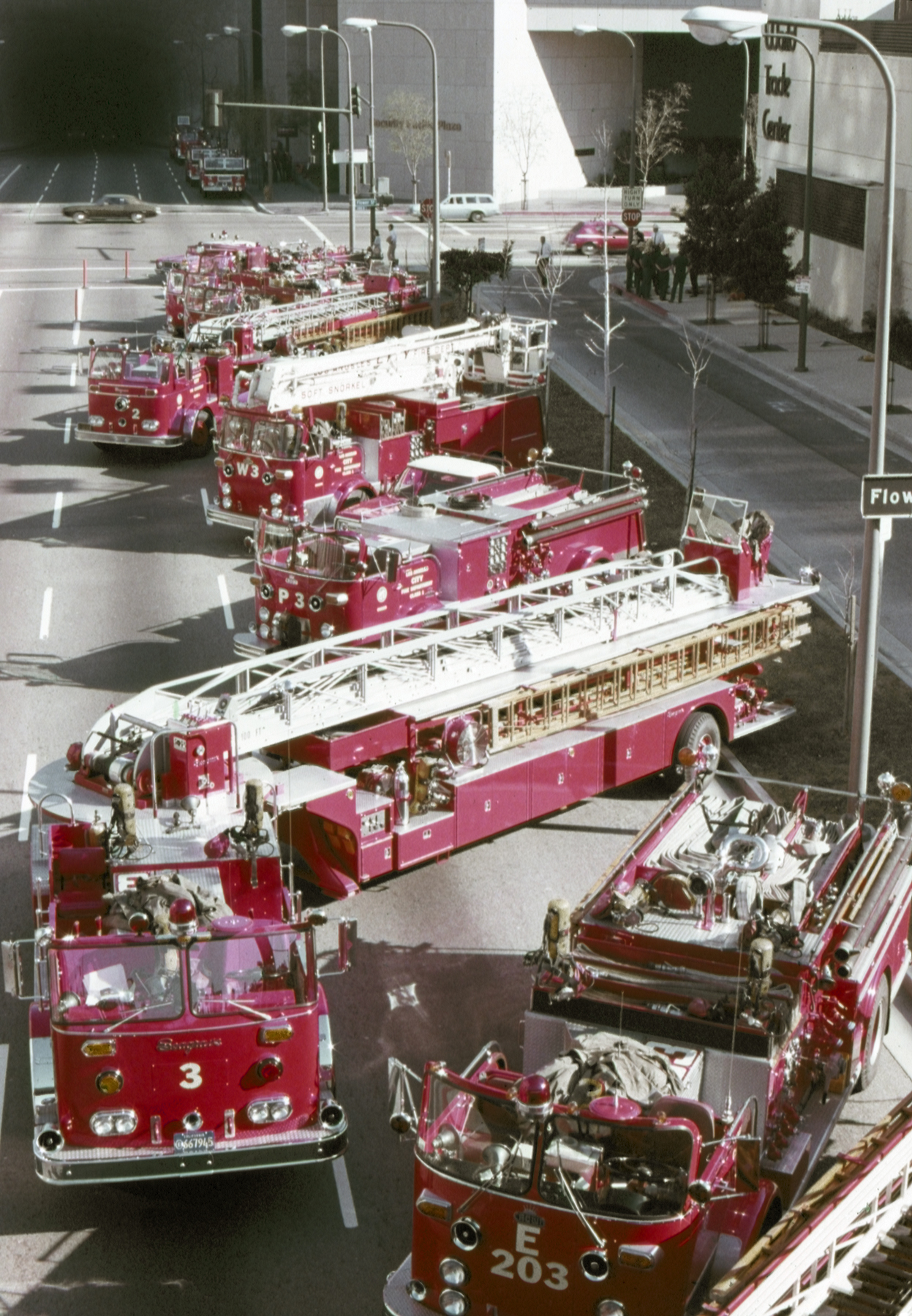
Los Angeles Fire Department Sunday morning training in downtown Los Angeles, February 1977

Since 1978, the LAFD has provided emergency medical and fire suppression services to the city of San Fernando by contract.

In responses to the 2020 pandemic, the LAFD helped administer the COVID-19 vaccine to residents from Los Angeles.

In 2022, Kristin Crowley became the first female, and the first openly gay, chief of the LAFD.

== Modern day ==
A 2021 Los Angeles Times investigation revealed that more than 54 percent of all fires requiring an LAFD response were associated with homelessness. Most are unintentional, resulting from the use of open-flame cooking equipment or campfires near tents and other flammable materials. Until June 2024, the city could not prohibit unhoused people from performing vital activities like cooking, and attempts to remove encampments from high-risk areas had been blocked by the United States Court of Appeals for the Ninth Circuit, which had ruled that the city was obligated to provide housing for the residents of a removed encampment.

About a third of homeless-related fires are classed as arson by the LAFD. The LAFD only forwards arson cases to the Police Department for investigation when there is significant property damage or they believe the victim was being targeted. Thus, very few homeless-related arsons are prosecuted. The problem of homeless-related fires becomes more grave with each passing year:

- In 2021, Los Angeles had, on average, 24 homeless-related fires every day (more than 54% of all fires).
- In 2024, Los Angeles had, on average, 46 homeless-related fires every day.

== Organization ==
=== Administration ===
Administration has the official office for the fire chief of the department,with the Fire Chief having the CAD designation of"FC1"and radio designation of"fire chief".The fire chief reports directly to the Board of Fire Commissioners.

=== Executive Bureau/Office Of the chief of staff ===
Executive Bureau/Office Of the chief of staff is commanded by a deputy chief (bureau commander) who holds the title of chief of staff. The chief of staff is assisted by an executive administrative assistant II and senior management analyst I. In 2022, the Executive Bureau was changed from the previous name of Administration Bureau.

== Rank structure ==
| Title | Details |
|---|---|
| Fire chief | The Fire Chief is General manager of the department.This is the Highest ranking uniformed employee. |
| Deputy chief | There are Seven positions for the Deputy Chiefs:chief of staff,deputy chief (emergency operations),chief of administrative operations,x4 bureau (Division) commanders |
| Assistant chief | There are Seventeen positions for Assistant Chiefs.Assignment varies. |
| Battalion chief | there are Sixty-seven positions for Battalion Chiefs.Assignment varies. |
| Captain II | Captain II Generally is the station commander of a task force station. |
| Captain I | Captain I is the Company commander of an engine company. |
| Apparatus operator | Apparatus Operator Drives truck,USAR,squads and heavy rescue Units |
| Engineer | Engineers Drive on the engine companies and manage the pump panel. |
| Firefighter III/paramedic | Firefighter holding a paramedic certification. |
| Firefighter III/Emergency Medical Technician (EMT) | Regular Duty Firefighter also performs as an Emergency Medical Technician (EMT) |
| Firefighter II/Emergency Medical Technician (EMT) | Probationary firefighter also performs as an Emergency Medical Technician (EMT) |
| Firefighter I/EMT | Academy recruit |

== Types of apparatus ==
The department utilizes a wide array of apparatuses and equipment. These are most but not all of the apparatus.

=== Triple combination engines ===
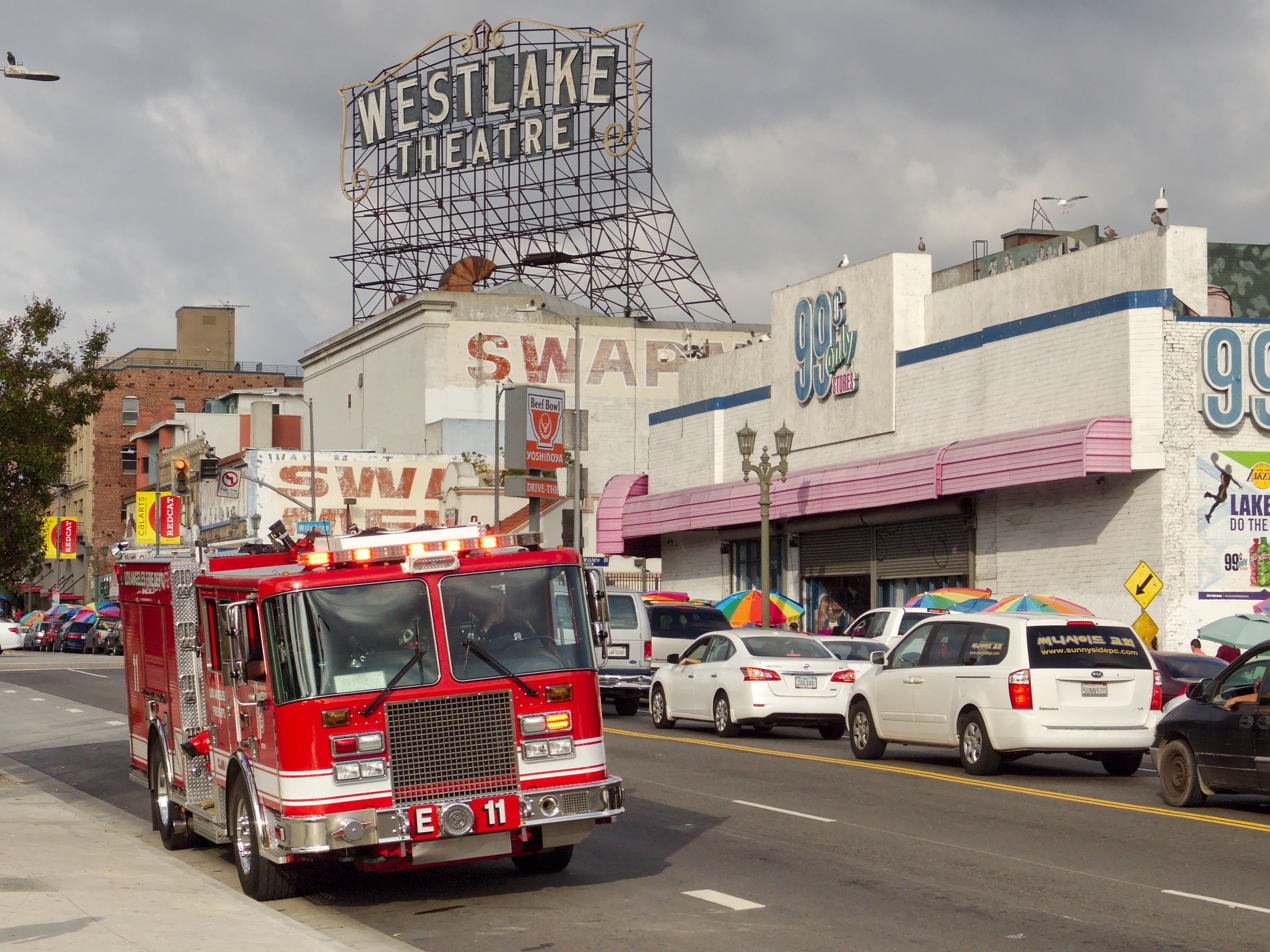
LAFD Engine Co. 11 responding to an emergency call

The triple combination fire engine or "triple" (as it is commonly called) is the most common type of firefighting apparatus in Los Angeles. The term "triple combination" refers to the apparatus having three components: a water tank, high capacity water pump, and hose. The triple can be found as a one-piece engine company or as two engines assigned to a task force station. The "triples" used by the LAFD have a direct drive, dual centrifuge main pump rated at 1,500 GPM at 150 psi with a 10-foot lift through a 6-inch suction. These apparatuses carry a combination of all of the following sizes of hose: 4″, 2 1/2″, 1 3/4″, 1 1/2″ and 1″. The standard hose load is 750' of 4", 750' of 2 1/2" with a 325GPM nozzle, 400' of 1 3/4" with a 200 GPM nozzle, 400' of 1 1/2" with a 125 GPM nozzle and 500' of 1" with a dual gallonage 10/40 GPM nozzle. The water tank carrying capacity of all LAFD engines is 500 gallons. All frontline engines are equipped with a 30-gallon Class A foam injection system with the exception of Engine 51 at LAX that carries Class B foam in the onboard system.

All Engine Companies have a wide range of Fire Suppression Tools and Equipment along with a wide variety of Basic Rescue and Medical Equipment.They are Staffed by an Engine Company Driver who is also responsible for manning and managing the pump,an officer (Captain) and Two Firefighters.

=== Light forces and task forces ===
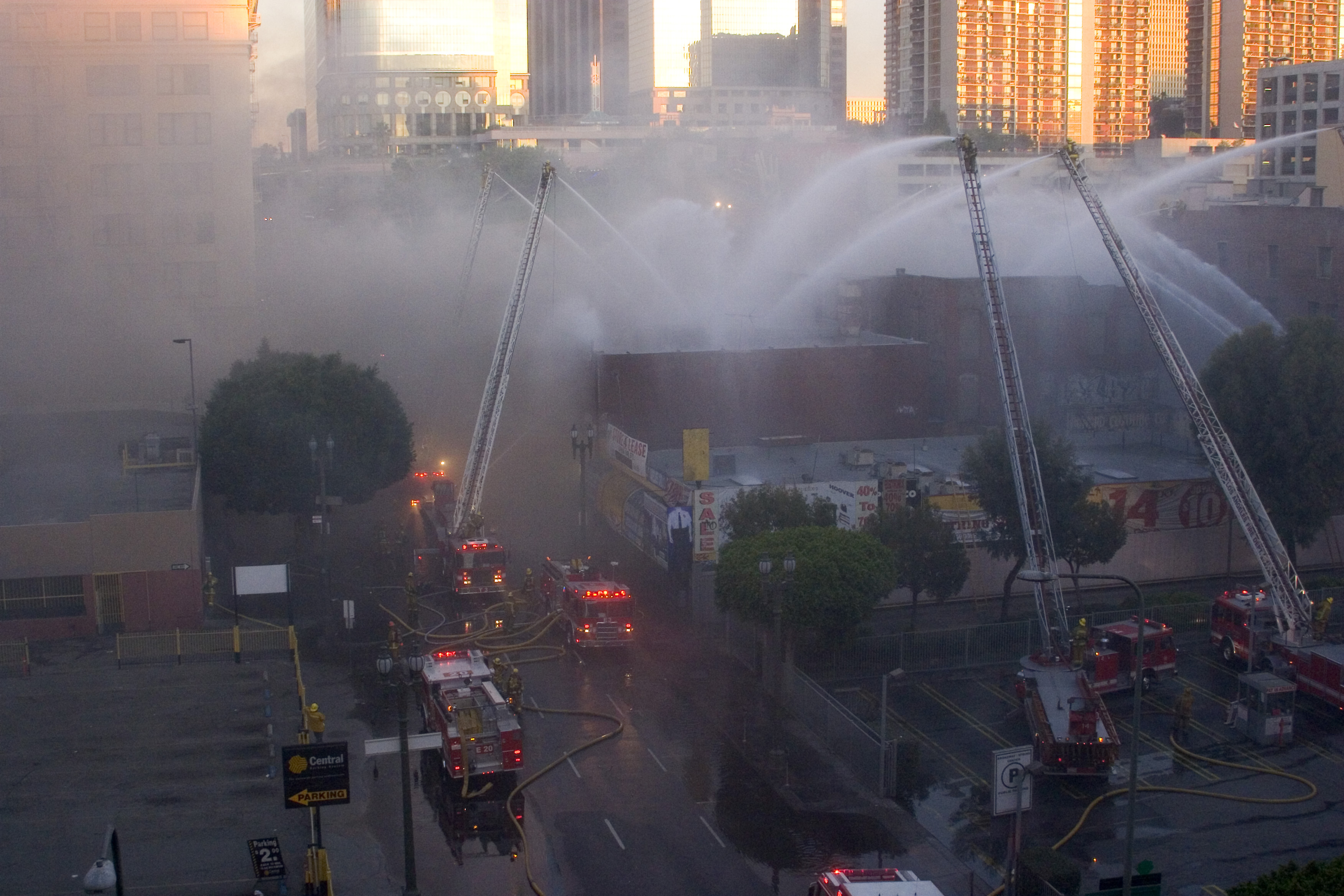
LAFD on the scene of a major structure fire

The LAFD uses the concept of light forces and task forces, which can be considered one "resource", although comprising more than one unit or company.

A light force is composed of a pump engine (200 series, for example Engine 201 or Engine 301 for 100 stations) and a ladder truck. Light forces almost always respond together as one unit or resource.

A task force is simply a light force coupled with an engine. An engine company is considered a single unit or "resource" when responding to incidents on its own. A task force usually responds to larger incidents, such as structural fires, and is made up of an engine, a 200 series engine (pump), and a truck, all operating together. While a standard engine is always staffed with a full crew, a 200 series engine (pump) is only staffed by a driver (and one other firefighter if responding as part of a light force). The purpose of the 200 series engine (pump) is to provide support and equipment to the truck in a light force, and either the truck company or the engine company in a task force.

=== Rescue ambulances ===
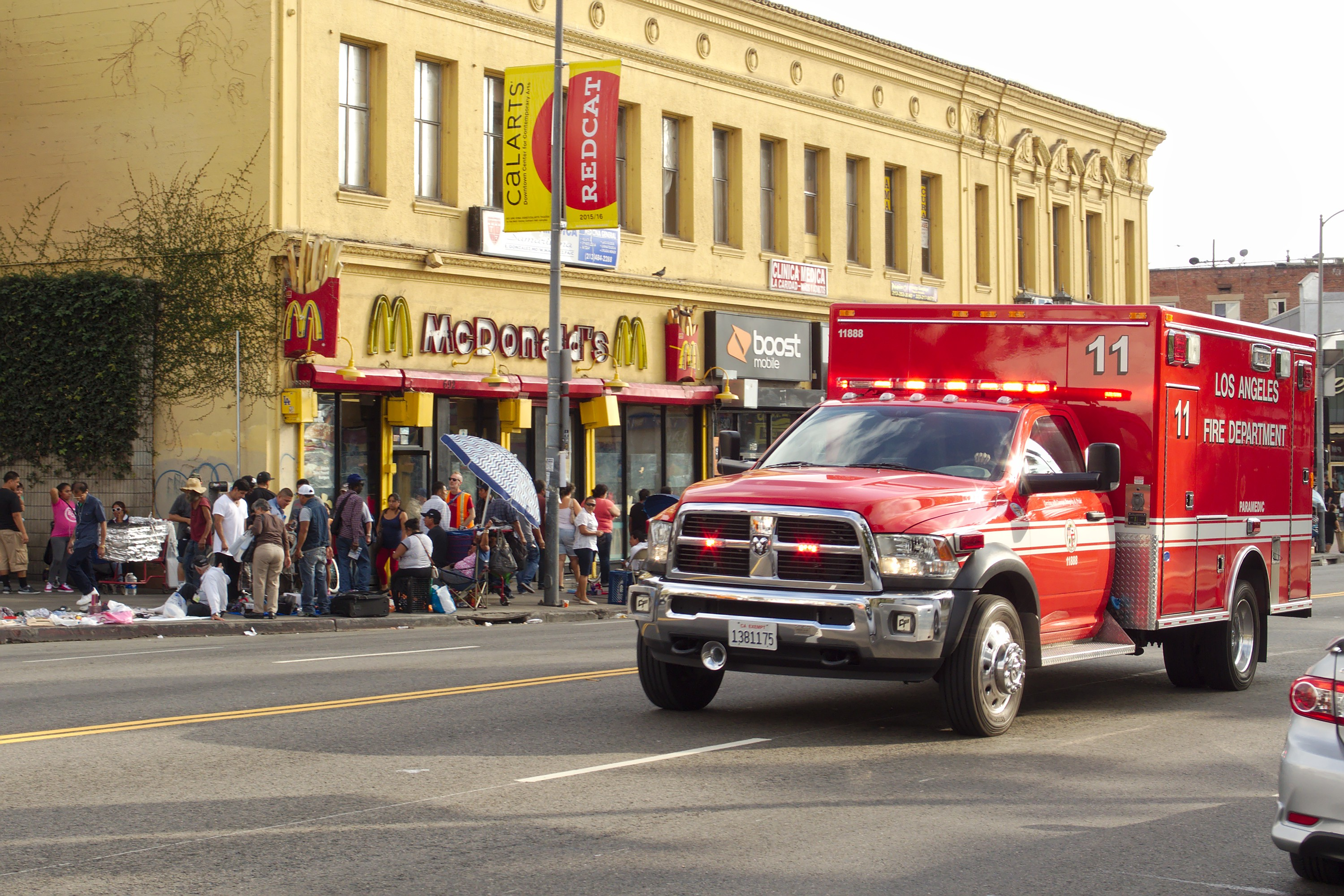
Rescue Ambulance 11 responding to a call near MacArthur Park

Rescue ambulances (RAs) are often called"rescues"for short.They can be considered either paramedic Staffed/advanced life support (ALS),or emergency medical technician Staffed/basic life support (BLS) units.Ambulances numbered 1-112 are frontline advanced life support units.They are staffed by two firefighters/paramedics,while those in the 200 series are advanced life support reserve units. Ambulances in the 800s and 900s are basic life support units staffed by two firefighter EMTs, with 900-series units assigned to stations identified numerically over 100.The Rescue Ambulances have a wide range of Specialized Medical Equipment on board including Cardiac Monitors and Defibrillators,Cardiac Drugs,Intubation And Airway Management Supplies and other Equipment for Medical Responses.

=== Helicopters ===
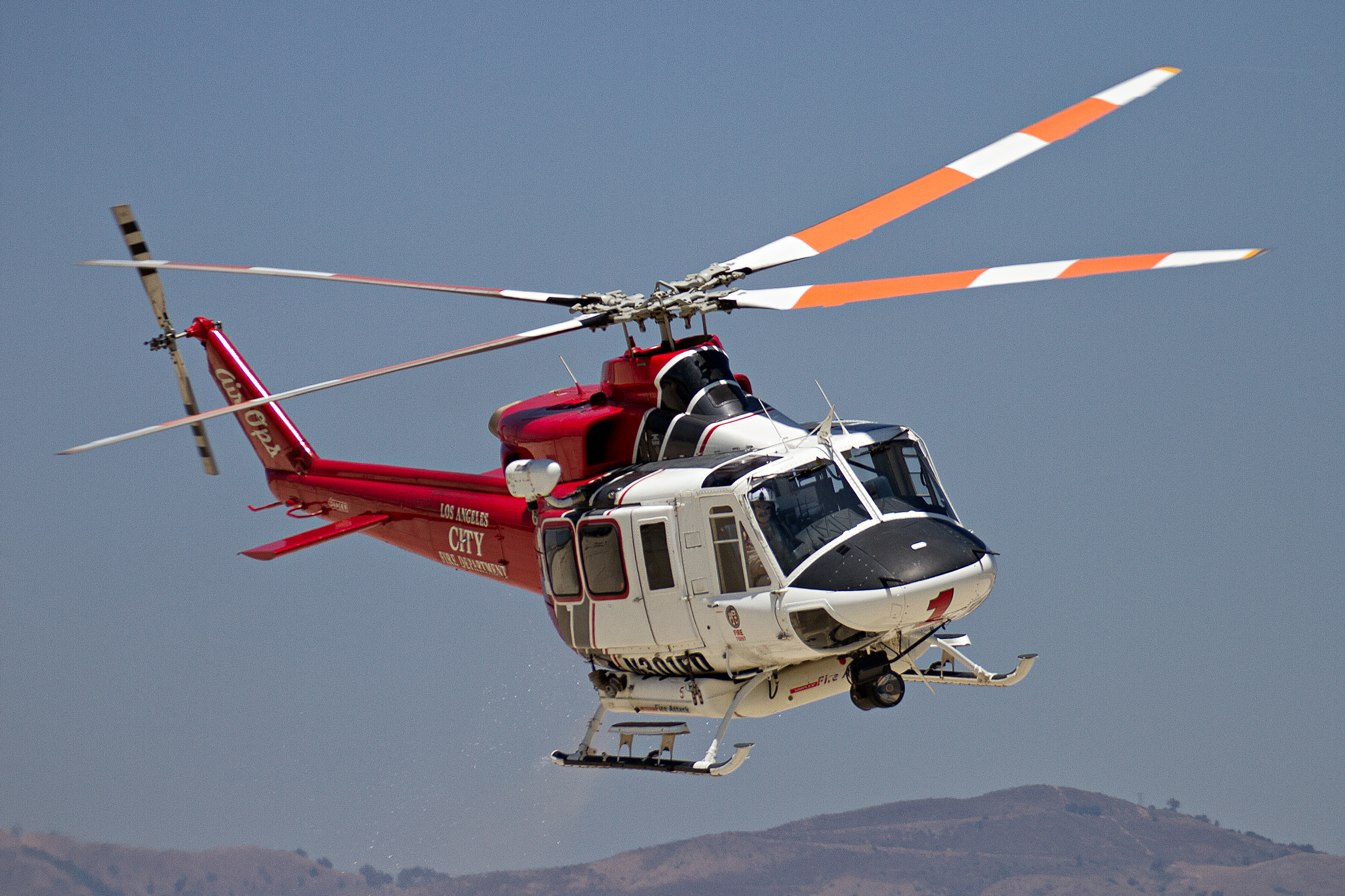
LAFD Bell 412 (retired)

The Air Operations Section (AIROPS) of the LAFD operates out of Fire Station 114 at Van Nuys Airport (KVNY). The helicopter fleet consists of five medium duty and two light duty helicopters, making the department capable of handling brush fire suppression, air ambulance transport, high rise fire response, and hoist rescues.

FIRE 1, FIRE 2, FIRE 3, FIRE 4, and FIRE 5 are all AgustaWestland AW139s. FIRE 6 and FIRE 7 are both Bell 206 B-III Jet Rangers.

The department previously operated Bell 205 and Bell 412 types, the last of which was retired in 2017 to make way for the newer AW139s.

=== Fireboats ===
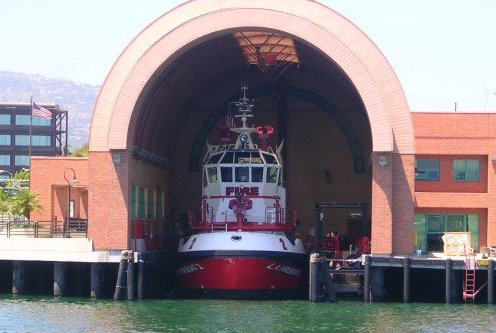
LAFD Fireboat 2, the Warner Lawrence

The Port of Los Angeles is under the jurisdiction of the LAFD which operates 5 fireboats to provide fire protection for ships and dockside structures. Fireboat 1, Fireboat 3 and Fireboat 5 are identical 39-foot (12 m) long aluminum fireboats capable of a top speed of 29 knots (33 mph; 54 km/h) while fully loaded. They are equipped with a 2,400 US gal/min (9,100 L/min) pump and a 1,000 US gal/min (3,800 L/min) deluge gun. They also have a 50-US-gallon (190 L) firefighting foam capacity.

Fireboat 4, also known as the Bethel F. Gifford, was commissioned in 1962 and is the oldest of the fleet. It is capable of pumping water at 9,000 US gal/min (34,000 L/min) and carries 550 US gallons (2,082 L) of foam solution for petrochemical fires. It is equipped with jet-stream nozzles to allow for increased maneuverability.

The newest and most technologically advanced of the fireboats is the 105-foot (32 m) long Fireboat 2, also known as the Warner Lawrence, which has the capability to pump up to 38,000 US gallons per minute (140,000 L/min) up to 400 feet (120 m) in the air. Boat 2 also has an onboard area for treatment and care of rescued persons.

=== California Task Force 1 ===
The Los Angeles Fire Department is the founding member of one of California's eight FEMA Urban Search and Rescue Task Forces. California Task Force 1 (CA-TF1) is available to respond to natural or man-made disasters around the country and world and assist with search and rescue, medical support, damage assessment and communications.

== Command structure ==
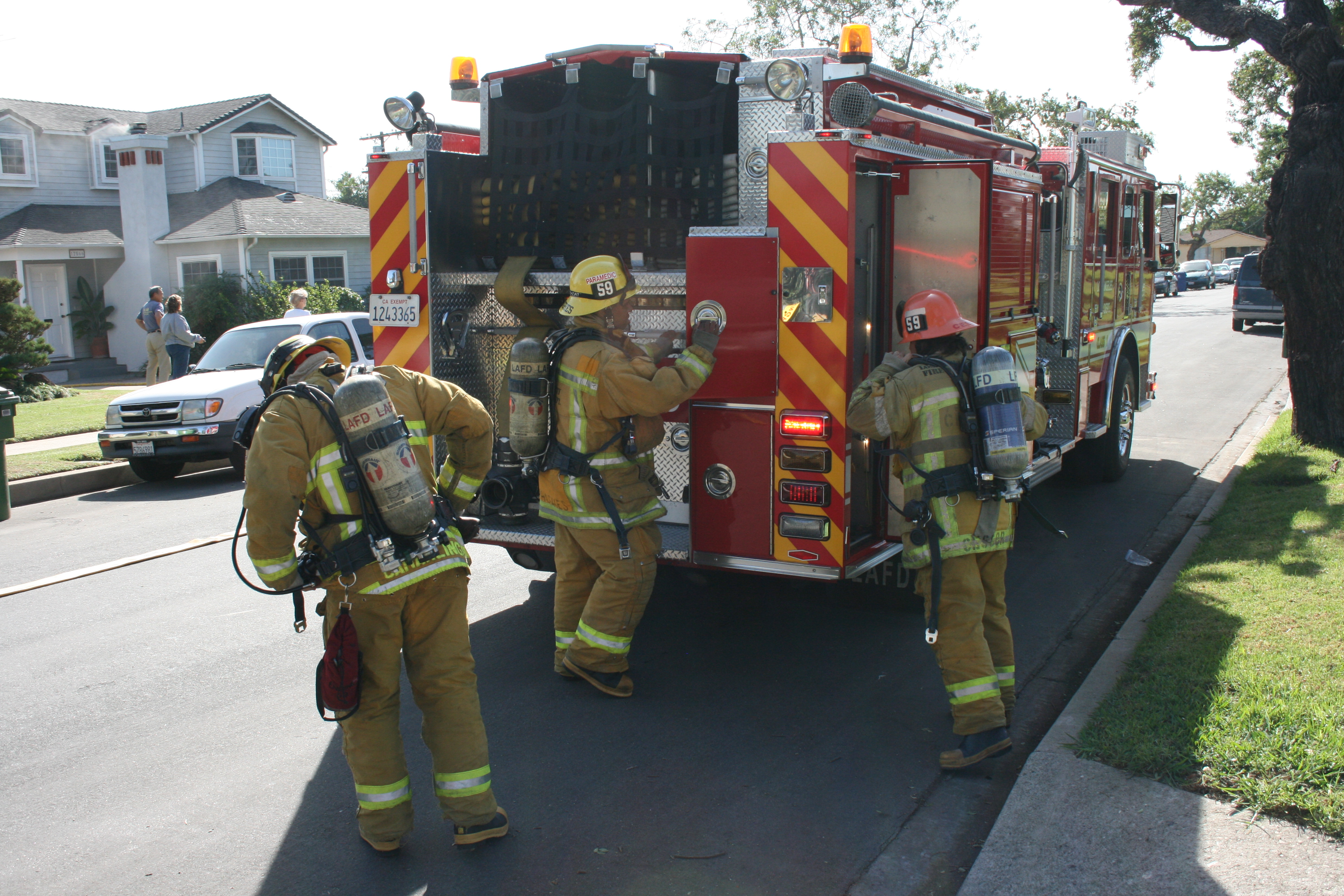
Engine 59 at the scene of a structure fire

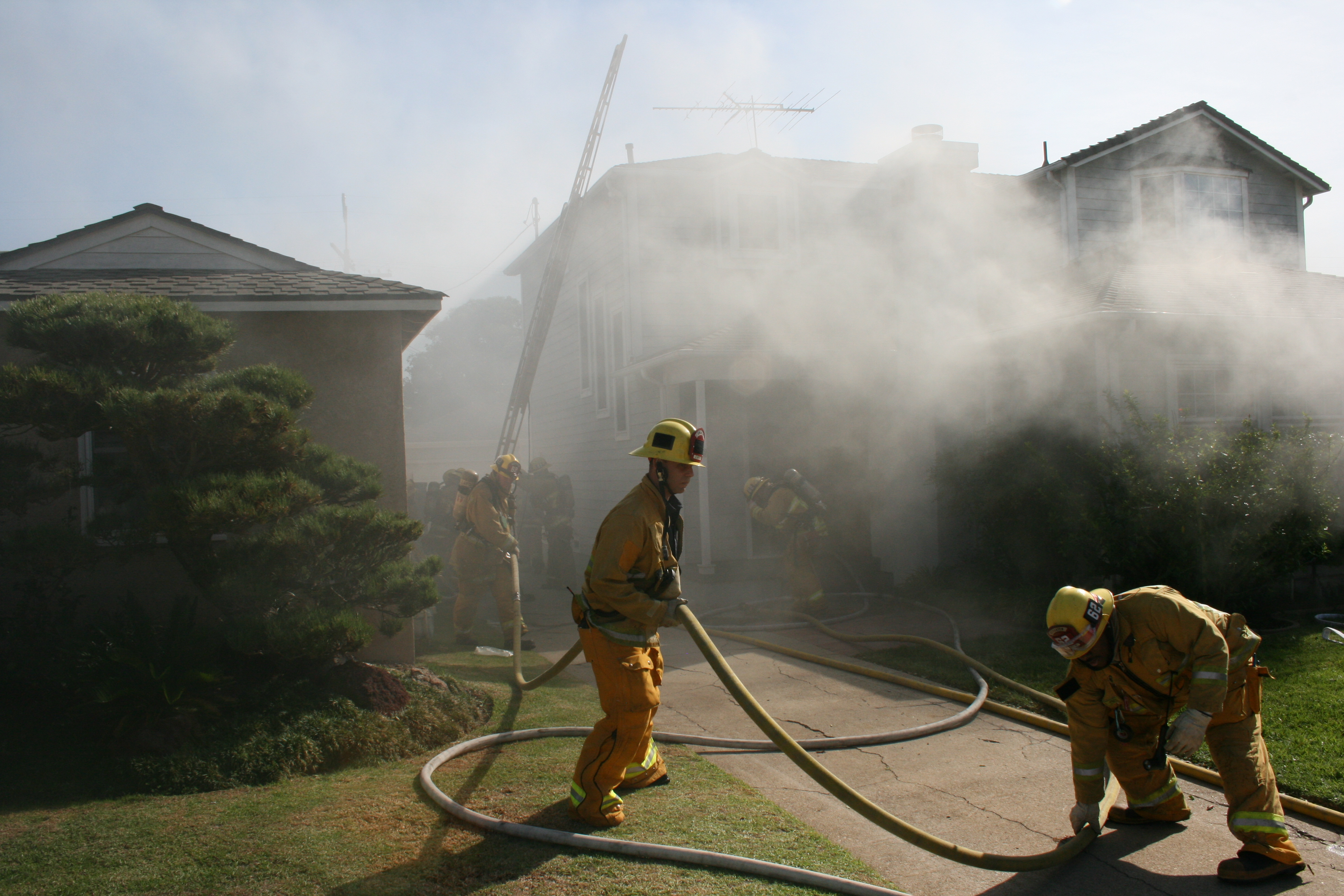
LAFD Firefighters battling a house fire

The LAFD is divided into four operational Bureaus: Operations Central Bureau (OCB), Operations West Bureau (OWB), Operations South Bureau (OSB), formerly known as South Division, and Operations Valley Bureau (OVB), formerly known as North Division. Each bureau is commanded by a deputy chief, who holds the title of bureau commander. Each bureau also has an assistant chief who serves as the assistant bureau commander. To replicate the former North and South Division, Operations Central Bureau (OCB) and Operations Valley Bureau (OVB) also have three additional assistant chiefs who work 24-hour platoon duty. These assistant chiefs staff marked Dodge RAM SUVs and respond to major incidents - assistant 2 for Operations Central Bureau (OCB) and assistant 4 of Operations Valley Bureau (OVB).

- Operations Central Bureau comprises three battalions and 22 fire stations. Battalion 1 (8 fire stations), Battalion 2 (8 fire stations) and Battalion 11 (6 fire stations). Operations Central Bureau headquarters are located at Fire Station 3 located in Civic Center and Bunker Hill.
- Operations West Bureau comprises three battalions and 21 fire stations. Battalion 4 (7 fire stations), Battalion 5 (7 fire stations) and Battalion 9 (7 fire stations). Operations West Bureau headquarters are located at Fire Station 82 located in Hollywood
- Operations South Bureau comprises three battalions and 25 fire stations. Battalion 6 (11 fire sStations), Battalion 13 (8 fire stations), Battalion 18 (6 fire stations). Operations South Bureau headquarters is located at the San Pedro Municipal Building (638 South Beacon Street, Suite 374).
- Operations Valley Bureau comprises five battalions and 31 fire stations. Battalion 10 (9 fire stations), Battalion 12 (7 fire stations), Battalion 14 (7 fire stations), Battalion 15 (8 fire stations) and Battalion 17. Operations Valley Bureau headquarters is temporarily located at Fire Station 83 in Encino.

Each of the four operational bureaus house a number of battalions. These battalions are staffed by uniformed personnel who rotate on a 24-hour platoon duty. Each battalion is commanded by a battalion chief, who responds to major incidents within their battalion, usually 20-30 square miles in size. They have the responsibility of commanding these scenes as the Incident Commander (IC). Battalion chiefs drive a Dodge RAM SUV to emergency incidents.

Note that stations with a truck and a 200 series engine (pump) will usually respond the two apparatuses together as a light force. For example, Truck 1 and Engine 201 will often respond together as Light Force 1. The only full-time exception is Fire Station 9, where Engine 209 is fully staffed. Truck 9 responds as a single company when appropriate. During augmented staffing (red-flag brush fire weather, or other increased threat days), the 200 series engines can be fully staffed as a four-member engine company. Each company can then either be dispatched individually or as a task force.

400 series engines are ready reserve apparatus. These apparatuses are full loaded with equipment and hose. They are used either for short term relief IE when a frontline apparatus is shut down for repair or maintenance. 400 series engines are also staffed as needed during "High Hazard" days or other augmented staffing times.

The LAFD has six Type 3 wildland engines. Five are property of the State of California OES, but are staffed as needed and maintained by the LAFD. Together these five engines form Strike Team 1880C. Engine 29C is housed at Fire Station 29 and is a Type 3 wildland Engine.

The LAFD also has four Type 6 OES wildland engines. These engines are property of the State of California OES but are staffed as needed and maintained by the LAFD.

Command assignment list

| CAD designation | Radio designation | Assignment | Rank |
|---|---|---|---|
| FC1 | "Fire chief" | Fire chief | Fire chief |
| CD1 | "Chief deputy 1" | Commander, administrative operations | Chief deputy |
| CD2 | "Chief deputy 2" | Commander, emergency operations | Chief deputy |
| DC6 | "Deputy 6" | Bureau commander, Emergency Medical Services Bureau | Deputy chief |
| DC7 | "Deputy 7" | Bureau commander, Fire Prevention and Public Safety Bureau | Deputy chief |
| DC9 | "Deputy 9" | Commander, Training and Support Bureau | Deputy chief |
| FA1 | "Fire administrator" | Bureau commander, Administrative Services Bureau | Fire administrator |
| MD1 | "Medical director" | Bureau commander, Emergency Medical Services Bureau | Medical director |
| MD2 | "Medical director" | Bureau commander, Emergency Medical Services Bureau | Medical director |
Operations Central Bureau
| DC2 | "Deputy 2" | Bureau commander, Operations Central Bureau | Deputy chief |
| AC2 | "Assistant 2" | Assistant bureau commander, Operations Central Bureau (24-hour Platoon Duty) | Assistant chief |
| CA20 | "Captain 20" | Training support specialist, Operations Central Bureau | Captain II |
| CA21 | "Captain 21" | EMS/community resilience officer, Operations Central Bureau | Captain I/paramedic |
Operations South Bureau
| DC3 | "Deputy 3" | Bureau commander, Operations South Bureau | Deputy chief |
| AC3 | "Assistant 3" | Assistant bureau commander, Operations South Bureau | Assistant chief |
| CA30 | "Captain 30" | Training support specialist, Operations South Bureau | Captain II |
| CA31 | "Captain 31" | EMS/community resilience officer, Operations South Bureau | Captain I/paramedic |
Operations Valley Bureau
| DC4 | "Deputy 4" | Bureau commander, Operations Valley Bureau | Deputy chief |
| AC4 | "Assistant 4" | Assistant bureau commander, Operations Valley Bureau (24-hour platoon duty) | Assistant chief |
| CA40 | "Captain 40" | Training support specialist, Operations Valley Bureau | Captain II |
| CA41 | "Captain 41" | EMS/community resilience officer, Operations Valley Bureau | Captain I/paramedic |
Operations West Bureau
| DC5 | "Deputy 5" | Bureau commander, Operations West Bureau | Deputy chief |
| AC5 | "Assistant 5" | Assistant bureau commander, Operations West Bureau | Assistant chief |
| AC12 | "Assistant 12" | Los Angeles World Airports | Assistant chief |
| CA50 | "Captain 50" | Training support specialist, Operations West Bureau | Captain II |
| CA51 | "Captain 51" | EMS/community resilience officer, Operations West Bureau | Captain I/paramedic |

CAD designation list

| Letter | Unit type |
|---|---|
| AF | Aircraft rescue firefighting (ARFF) |
| AO | Air operations CAD placeholder |
| AP | Advanced provider |
| AR | Arson investigator, Arson/Counter-Terrorism Section |
| BC | Battalion chief |
| BP | Brush patrol |
| BT | Fireboat |
| CE | Community Emergency Response Team (CERT) |
| CL | Community liaison officer |
| CS | Communications support |
| CT | Cycle Team |
| CW | Wildland Fire Handcrew (Crew) |
| DT | Dozer tender |
| DZ | Dozer |
| E | Engine |
| EA | Emergency air |
| EM | EMS captain |
| F | Aircraft foam |
| FC | Fire chief |
| FP | Inspector, Fire Prevention & Public Safety Bureau |
| FR | Fast response |
| H0A-HOF | Air operations CAD placeholder |
| H | Helicopter |
| HA | Helicopter MDT |
| HE | Heavy equipment |
| HH | Hose hauler |
| HL | Homeland Security Division |
| HM | Hazardous Material Squad |
| HR | Heavy rescue |
| HT | Helicopter tender |
| HU | Hydration Unit |
| JT | Joint Hazard Assessment Team (JHAT) |
| LD | Loader / dozer team |
| PB | Plug buggy |
| PH | Photographer |
| PI | Public information officer, Community Service Unit |
| RA | Rescue ambulance |
| RH | Rescue helicopter |
| RI | Radio interoperability |
| RM | Risk Management Section |
| RS | Robotic solution |
| RT | Rehab tender |
| SC | Swift water coordinator |
| SO | Safety officer |
| SW | Swift water rescue |
| T | Truck |
| TL | Team leader, Tactical Emergency Medical Support Unit |
| TM | Tactical medic, Tactical Emergency Medical Support Unit |
| TP | Transport |
| UA | Unmanned aerial (drone) |
| UR | Urban search and rescue |
| WT | Water tender |

== Station list ==
| Fire station | Neighborhood(s) | Engine company | Light force or truck company | EMS unit | Command unit | Special unit | Bureau | Battalion |
|---|---|---|---|---|---|---|---|---|
| 1 | Lincoln Heights | Engine 1 | Light Force 1 | Rescue Ambulance 1 Rescue Ambulance 801 | Command 1 | Rescue 601 | Central Bureau | 2 |
| 2 | Boyle Heights | Engine 2 | Light Force 2 | Rescue Ambulance 2 | | | Central Bureau | 1 |
| 3 | Civic Center & Bunker Hill | Engine 3 | Light Force 3 | Rescue Ambulance 3 Rescue Ambulance 803 | Deputy 2 Assistant 2 Assistant 702 (Reserve) | USAR 3 USAR Tender 3 Heavy Rescue 3 Heavy Rescue 703 (Reserve); Emergency Light Unit 3 Medical Supply Trailer 3 | Central Bureau | 1 |
| 4 | Little Tokyo/Arts District | Engine 4 | | Rescue Ambulance 4 Rescue Ambulance 804 | Command Post 2 Battalion Chief 1 EMS 1 | Battalion Chief 701 | Central Bureau | 1 |
| 5 | Westchester | Engine 5 | Light Force 5 | Rescue Ambulance 5 Rescue 805 | Battalion Chief 4 EMS 4 | USAR 5 USAR Tender 5 Swift Water Rescue 5 | West Bureau | 4 |
| 6 | East Hollywood/Historic Filipinotown (formerly Angeleno Heights) | Engine 6 | | Rescue Ambulance 6 Rescue Ambulance 806 | | | Central Bureau | 11 |
| 7 | Arleta | Engine 7 Engine 207 | | Rescue Ambulance 7 Advanced Provider 7 Rescue 807 | | OES Engine 1611 | Valley Bureau | 12 |
| 8 | Porter Ranch | Engine 8 | | | | Brush Patrol 8 | Valley Bureau | 15 |
| 9 | Skid Row | Engine 9 Engine 209 | Truck 9 | Rescue Ambulance 9 Rescue Ambulance 209; Rescue Ambulance 809; Rescue Ambulance 900 (night time) | | Fast Response 9 | Central Bureau | 1 |
| 10 | Convention Center/South Park Downtown | Engine 10 | Light Force 10 | Rescue Ambulance 10; Rescue Ambulance 810 | | | Central Bureau | 1 |
| 11 | Westlake & MacArthur Park | Engine 11 | Light Force 11 | Rescue Ambulance 11; Rescue Ambulance 211; Rescue Ambulance 811 | | Fast Response 11; Rescue Ambulance 611 | Central Bureau | 11 |
| 12 | Highland Park | Engine 12 | Light Force 12 | Rescue Ambulance 12 | | Plug Buggy 12 | Central Bureau | 2 |
| 13 | Pico-Union | Engine 13 | | Rescue Ambulance 13; Rescue Ambulance 813; Advance Provider 13 | Battalion Chief 11; EMS 11 | CERT 13 | Central Bureau | 11 |
| 14 | South Central | Engine 14 | | Rescue Ambulance 14; Rescue Ambulance 814 | | | Central Bureau | 1 |
| 15 | USC/Exposition Park | Engine 15 | Light Force 15 | Rescue Ambulance 15; Rescue Ambulance 815; Alternate Destination 15 | | Plug Buggy 15 | South Bureau | 13 |
| 16 | South El Sereno | Engine 16 | | | | | Central Bureau | 2 |
| 17 | Industrial Eastside/Wholesale District | Engine 17 | | Rescue Ambulance 17 | | Engine 417; Arson Unit 1 | Central Bureau | 1 |
| 18 | Knollwood (formerly West Adams) | Engine 18 | | Rescue Ambulance 18 | | | Valley Bureau | 15 |
| 19 | Brentwood | Engine 19 | | Rescue Ambulance 19 | | Brush Patrol 19 | West Bureau | 9 |
| 20 | Echo Park | Engine 20 | Light Force 20 | Rescue Ambulance 20 | | Plug Buggy 20 | Central Bureau | 11 |
| 21 | South Los Angeles | Engine 21 | Light Force 21 | Rescue Ambulance 21 | | Hazmat 21; OES Hazmat 12 | South Bureau | 13 |
| 23 | Palisades Highlands/Castellammare (formerly Downtown Los Angeles) | Engine 23 | | Rescue Ambulance 23 | | Brush Patrol 23 | West Bureau | 9 |
| 24 | Sunland | Engine 24 | | | | Battalion Chief 712 | Valley Bureau | 12 |
| 25 | Boyle Heights | Engine 25 | | Rescue Ambulance 25 | | | Central Bureau | 1 |
| 26 | West Adams | Engine 26 | Light Force 26 | Rescue Ambulance 26; Rescue Ambulance 826 | | | Central Bureau | 11 |
| 27 | Hollywood | Engine 27 | Light Force 27 | Rescue Ambulance 27; Rescue Ambulance 827 | Battalion Chief 5 | USAR 27 | West Bureau | 5 |
| 28 | Porter Ranch | Engine 28 | | Rescue Ambulance 828 | | Brush Patrol 28; Plug Buggy 28 | Valley Bureau | 15 |
| 29 | Hancock Park/Koreatown | Engine 29 | Light Force 29 | Rescue Ambulance 29; Rescue Ambulance 829 | | Engine 29C; Plug Buggy 29 | Central Bureau | 11 |
| 33 | South Park | Engine 33 | Light Force 33 | Rescue Ambulance 33; Rescue Ambulance 833 | Battalion Chief 13 | Plug Buggy 33 | South Bureau | 13 |
| 34 | Crenshaw & Leimert Park | Engine 34 | | Rescue Ambulance 34; Rescue Ambulance 834 | | Medical Supply Trailer 34 | South Bureau | 18 |
| 35 | Los Feliz | Engine 35 | Light Force 35 | Rescue Ambulance 35; Rescue Ambulance 835 | | OES Engine 8136; Plug Buggy 35 | West Bureau | 5 |
| 36 | San Pedro (Northwest) | Engine 36 | | Rescue Ambulance 36 | EMS 6 | | South Bureau | 6 |
| 37 | Westwood; UCLA | Engine 37 | Light Force 37 | Rescue Ambulance 37; Rescue Ambulance 837 | Battalion Chief 9 | | West Bureau | 9 |
| 38 | Wilmington | Engine 38 | Light Force 38 | Rescue Ambulance 38 | | | South Bureau | 6 |
| 39 | Van Nuys | Engine 39 | Light Force 39 | Rescue Ambulance 39; Rescue Ambulance 839 | Battalion Chief 10 | OES Engine 1614 | Valley Bureau | 10 |
| 40 | Terminal Island | Engine 40 | | | | Rehab/Air Tender 40 | South Bureau | 6 |
| 41 | Hollywood West | Engine 41 | | Rescue Ambulance 41 | | Brush Patrol 41 | West Bureau | 5 |
| 42 | Eagle Rock | Engine 42 | | | | | Central Bureau | 2 |
| 43 | Palms | Engine 43 | | Rescue Ambulance 43 | | Engine 443; CERT 43 | South Bureau | 18 |
| 44 | Cypress Park | Engine 44 | | Rescue Ambulance 844 | EMS 2 | Brush Patrol 44; Swift Water Rescue 44; Casualty Collection Point Trailer | Central Bureau | 2 |
| 46 | Coliseum Area/Vermont Square | Engine 46 | | Rescue Ambulance 46; Rescue Ambulance 246; Rescue Ambulance 846 | | | South Bureau | 13 |
| 47 | El Sereno | Engine 47 | | Rescue Ambulance 47 | | Brush Patrol 47; Engine 447 | Central Bureau | 2 |
| 48 | San Pedro | Engine 48 | Light Force 48 | Rescue Ambulance 848 | | Hazmat 48 | South Bureau | 6 |
| 49 | East Harbor | Engine 49 | | | Battalion Chief 6 | Fireboat 3 Fireboat 4 | South Bureau | 6 |
| 50 | Atwater Village/Glassell Park | | Light Force 50 | Rescue Ambulance 850 | | Engine 450 | Central Bureau | 2 |
| 51 | LAX | Engine 51 | | Rescue Ambulance 51 | | Cycle Team 51; Cycle Team 251 | West Bureau | 4 |
| 52 | Hollywood | Engine 52 | | Rescue Ambulance 52 | | | West Bureau | 5 |
| 55 | Eagle Rock (Occidental College/York Blvd area) | Engine 55 | | Rescue Ambulance 55 | Battalion Chief 2 | | Central Bureau | 2 |
| 56 | Silver Lake | Engine 56 | | Rescue Ambulance 56 | | | West Bureau | 5 |
| 57 | Vermont Knolls | Engine 57 | | Rescue Ambulance 57; Rescue Ambulance 257; Rescue Ambulance 857 | | | South Bureau | 13 |
| 58 | Pico-Robertson | Engine 58 | | Rescue Ambulance 58; Rescue Ambulance 858; Advanced Provider 58 | | Engine 458; Plug Buggy 58 | South Bureau | 18 |
| 59 | West Los Angeles | Engine 59 | | Rescue Ambulance 59 | EMS 9 | Rehab/Air Tender 59; CERT 59; Medical Supply Trailer 59 | West Bureau | 9 |
| 60 | North Hollywood | Engine 60 | Light Force 60 | Rescue Ambulance 60; Rescue Ambulance 860 | Battalion Chief 14 | OES Engine 1615; Plug Buggy 60 | Valley Bureau | 14 |
| 61 | Fairfax/Hancock Park/Miracle Mile | Engine 61 | Light Force 61 | Rescue Ambulance 61; Rescue Ambulance 861 | EMS 18 | | South Bureau | 18 |
| 62 | Mar Vista | Engine 62 | | Rescue Ambulance 62; Rescue Ambulance 862 | | Engine 462 | West Bureau | 4 |
| 63 | Venice | Engine 63 | Light Force 63 | Rescue Ambulance 63 | | | West Bureau | 4 |
| 64 | Broadway Manchester/Green Meadows | Engine 64 | Light Force 64 | Rescue Ambulance 64; Rescue Ambulance 264; Rescue Ambulance 864 | | Fast Response 64 | South Bureau | 13 |
| 65 | Watts | Engine 65 | | Rescue Ambulance 65; Rescue Ambulance 865; Advanced Provider 65 | EMS 13 | | South Bureau | 13 |
| 66 | Chesterfield Square | Engine 66 | Light Force 66 | Rescue Ambulance 66; Rescue Ambulance 266; Rescue Ambulance 866 | | | South Bureau | 13 |
| 67 | Playa Vista | Engine 67 | | Rescue Ambulance 867 | | | West Bureau | 4 |
| 68 | Mid-City | Engine 68 | | Rescue Ambulance 68; Rescue Ambulance 868 | Battalion Chief 18 | | South Bureau | 18 |
| 69 | Pacific Palisades | Engine 69 | Light Force 69 | Rescue Ambulance 69 | | | West Bureau | 9 |
| 70 | Northridge | Engine 70 | | Rescue Ambulance 70 | Battalion Chief 15; EMS 15 | | Valley Bureau | 15 |
| 71 | Bel Air | Engine 71 | | Rescue Ambulance 71 | | | West Bureau | 9 |
| 72 | Canoga Park/Winnetka | Engine 72 | | Rescue Ambulance 72; Rescue Ambulance 872 | | Engine 472 | Valley Bureau | 17 |
| 73 | Reseda | Engine 73 | Light Force 73 | Rescue Ambulance 73; Rescue Ambulance 873 | | Plug Buggy 73 | Valley Bureau | 17 |
| 74 | Sunland-Tujunga | | Light Force 74 | Rescue Ambulance 74; Rescue Ambulance 874 | | Brush Patrol 74 | Valley Bureau | 12 |
| 75 | Mission Hills | Engine 75 | Light Force 75 | Rescue Ambulance 75; Rescue Ambulance 875 | | Hazmat Tender 75 | Valley Bureau | 12 |
| 76 | Cahuenga Pass/Hollywood Hills | Engine 76 | | Rescue Ambulance 76 | | | West Bureau | 5 |
| 77 | Sun Valley | Engine 77 | | Rescue Ambulance 77 | EMS 12 | Water Tender 77 | Valley Bureau | 12 |
| 78 | Studio City | | Light Force 78 | Rescue Ambulance 78; Rescue Ambulance 878 | EMS 14 | Brush Patrol 78 | Valley Bureau | 14 |
| 79 | Harbor Gateway | Engine 79 | | Rescue Ambulance 79 | | | South Bureau | 6 |
| 80 | LAX | | | | | ARFF 1 ARFF 2 ARFF 3 ARFF 4 ARFF 5 ARFF 6 ARFF 7 Stair 80 | West Bureau | 4 |
| 81 | Panorama City | Engine 81 | | Rescue Ambulance 81; Rescue Ambulance 881 | | Engine 481 | Valley Bureau | 10 |
| 82 | Hollywood | Engine 82; Engine 82 (Electric) | | Rescue Ambulance 82; Rescue Ambulance 882; Advanced Provider 82 | Deputy 5 Assistant 5 | Brush Patrol 82; Engine 482; EMS 5 | West Bureau | 5 |
| 83 | Encino | Engine 83 | | Rescue Ambulance 83; Rescue Ambulance 883 | | Rehab/Air Tender 83; Brush Patrol 83; Medical Supply Trailer 83 | Valley Bureau | 10 |
| 84 | Woodland Hills | Engine 84 | | Rescue Ambulance 84 | Battalion Chief 17; EMS 17 | Brush Patrol 84; Crew 3 Engine 473; Plug Buggy 84; CERT 84 | Valley Bureau | 17 |
| 85 | Harbor City | Engine 85 | Light Force 85 | Rescue Ambulance 85; Rescue Ambulance 885 | | USAR 85 | South Bureau | 6 |
| 86 | Toluca Lake | Engine 86 | | Rescue Ambulance 86 | | | Valley Bureau | 14 |
| 87 | Granada Hills | Engine 87 | Light Force 87 | Rescue Ambulance 87; Rescue Ambulance 887 | | Hazmat 87; Hazmat Tender 87; OES Engine 8137 | Valley Bureau | 15 |
| 88 | Sherman Oaks | Engine 88 | Light Force 88 | Rescue Ambulance 88 | Command 42 | Water Tender 88; USAR 88; Swift Water Rescue 88; OES Engine 8138 Dozer 11 Dozer 41||Valley Bureau||10 | | |
| 89 | North Hollywood | Engine 89 | Light Force 89 | Rescue Ambulance 89; Rescue Ambulance 889 | | Crew 4 USAR 89; Swift Water 89; OES Engine 8139; PB1880C; Medical Supply Trailer 89 | Valley Bureau | 14 |
| 90 | Van Nuys Airport | Engine 90 | Light Force 90 | Rescue Ambulance 90; Rescue Ambulance 890 | | Plug Buggy 90 | Valley Bureau | 10 |
| 91 | Sylmar | Engine 91 | | Rescue Ambulance 91; Rescue Ambulance 891 | | Fast Response 91 | Valley Bureau | 12 |
| 92 | Century City/Cheviot Hills/Rancho Park | | Light Force 92 | Rescue Ambulance 92; Rescue Ambulance 892 | | Engine 492 | West Bureau | 9 |
| 93 | Tarzana | Engine 93 | Light Force 93 | Rescue Ambulance 93 | | | Valley Bureau | 17 |
| 94 | Crenshaw/Baldwin Hills | Engine 94 | Light Force 94 | Rescue Ambulance 94; Rescue Ambulance 894 | | OES Engine 1616; Hazmat Tender 94 | South Bureau | 18 |
| 95 | LAX | Engine 95 | Light Force 95 | Rescue Ambulance 95 | | Hazmat 95 | West Bureau | 4 |
| 96 | Chatsworth | | Light Force 96 | Rescue Ambulance 96; Rescue Ambulance 896 | | Engine 496 | Valley Bureau | 15 |
| 97 | Laurel Canyon | Engine 97 | | Rescue Ambulance 97 | | Hose Hauler 97 | Valley Bureau | 14 |
| 98 | Pacoima | Engine 98 | Light Force 98 | Rescue Ambulance 98; Rescue Ambulance 898 | Battalion Chief 12 | OES Engine 8140 | Valley Bureau | 12 |
| 99 | Beverly Glen | Engine 99 | | Rescue Ambulance 99 | | Brush Patrol 99 | Valley Bureau | 10 |
| 100 | Lake Balboa | Engine 100 | | Rescue Ambulance 100 | EMS 10 | | Valley Bureau | 10 |
| 101 | San Pedro (Southwest) | Engine 101 | | Rescue Ambulance 101 | | | South Bureau | 6 |
| 102 | Valley Glen | Engine 102 | | Rescue Ambulance 102 | | | Valley Bureau | 14 |
| 103 | CSU Northridge | Engine 103 | | Rescue Ambulance 903 | | | Valley Bureau | 15 |
| 104 | Winnetka | Engine 104 | | Rescue Ambulance 104 | | | Valley Bureau | 17 |
| 105 | Woodland Hills/West Hills | Engine 105 | Light Force 105 | Rescue Ambulance 105 | | | Valley Bureau | 17 |
| 106 | Canoga Park/West Hills | Engine 106 | | Rescue Ambulance 106 | | | Valley Bureau | 17 |
| 107 | Chatsworth | Engine 107 | | Rescue Ambulance 107 | | | Valley Bureau | 15 |
| 108 | Franklin Canyon Park | Engine 108 | | | | | Valley Bureau | 14 |
| 109 | Encino/Bel Air Crest | Engine 109 | | Rescue Ambulance 909 | | Brush Patrol 109 | Valley Bureau | 10 |
| 110 | Fort MacArthur/Port of Los Angeles/Cabrillo Marina (Fireboat only) | | | | | Fireboat 5 Fireboat 17 | South Bureau | 6 |
| 111 | Port of Los Angeles (Fireboat only) | | | | | Fireboat 1 | South Bureau | 6 |
| 112 | Port of Los Angeles/Terminal Island | Engine 112 | | Rescue Ambulance 112 | | Fireboat 2 Fireboat 17; Medical Supply Trailer 112 | South Bureau | 6 |
| 114 | Van Nuys Airport | | | | | ARFF 114; Foam 114; FIRE 1 FIRE 2 FIRE 3 FIRE 4 FIRE 5 FIRE 6 FIRE 7 Helicopter Tender 1 Helicopter Tender 2 Casualty Collection Point Trailer (2) | Valley Bureau | 10 |
| 115 | Van Nuys | | | | Deputy 4 Assistant 4 | | Valley Bureau | 10 |

== In pop culture ==
The LAFD has been featured in many TV shows, movies, and video games. Sometimes the LAFD or LAFD equipment is just seen in the background.

- (1974) Firehouse, starring James Drury
- (1981–1982) Code Red, starring Lorne Greene
- (1995–2000) LAPD: Life on the Beat, the fire department was featured often responding to various emergency calls with the "LAPD".
- (1999) Rescue 77
- (2004) Grand Theft Auto: San Andreas, appears as Fire Department of San Andreas
- (2013) Grand Theft Auto V, appears as Los Santos Fire Department
- (2015) San Andreas, Dwayne Johnson plays a rescue helicopter pilot who works for the LAFD.
- (2018–present) 9-1-1, the show's main characters work for the LAFD in the fictional station 118.
- (2018–present) The Rookie, the show's main character dates a firefighter who works for the LAFD.

== See also ==
- Fire Station No. 1
- Engine Company No. 28
- Engine House No. 18 (Los Angeles, California)
- Fire Station No. 14 (Los Angeles, California)
- Fire Station No. 23 (Los Angeles, California)
- Fire Station No. 30, Engine Company No. 30
- Los Angeles Fire Department Museum and Memorial
- Louis R. Nowell, fire captain who became a city council member
- Ralph J. Scott, formerly known as Fireboat #2
- The Stentorians Fire Station No.46
- Frank Hotchkin Memorial Training Center Los Angeles
