= Warner L. Lawrence =

Los Angeles Fire Department Fireboat

Coordinates: 33.740574°N 118.278369°W

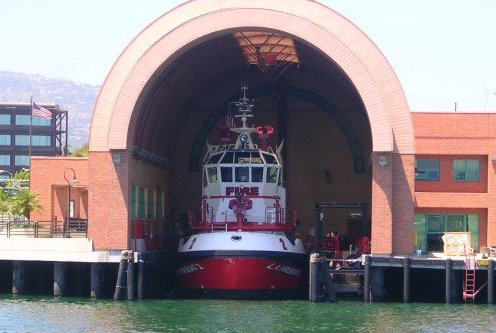

History

Los Angeles Fire Department
- Name: Warner L. Lawrence
- Namesake: Captain Warner Lawrence
- Operator: Los Angeles Fire Department
- Builder: Nichols Brothers Boat Builders
- Launched: 17 January 2003
- Christened: 12 April 2003
- Acquired: 21 March 2003
- In service: in active service
- Home port: Port of Los Angeles
- Identification: IMO number: 9271535; MMSI number: 338093777
- Status: In service as of 2020

General characteristics
- Length: 114 feet 10 inches (35.00 m)
- Beam: 32 feet 9 inches (9.98 m)
- Draft: 6 feet 11 inches (2.11 m)
- Depth: 13 feet 4 inches (4.06 m)
- Installed power: 2 × 1,800 horsepower (1,300 kW) MTU 12V-4000
- Propulsion: Voith Schneider cycloidal drive
- Speed: 15 knots (28 km/h; 17 mph)
- Capacity: 12 firefighters
- Crew: 6

Warner Lawrence is a fireboat owned and operated by the Los Angeles Fire Department (LAFD) in Los Angeles. Designed by Robert Allan Ltd. in the early 2000s, Warner Lawrence was built in Washington and delivered to San Pedro on 21 May 2003. She was dedicated on 12 April of that year. She was built by Nichols Boats of Freeland, Washington, according to the LAFD. She replaced the fireboat Ralph J. Scott.

It is an omnidirectional vessel driven by two Voith Schneider Propellers type 26 GII/165-AE 45. Warner Lawrence has the capability to pump up to 38,000 US gallons per minute (2.397 m^{3}/s) up to 400 feet (121.9 m) in the air; has 10 monitors. Its pumps are powered by two 1,575 horsepower (1,174 kW) pump engines. It has a fully equipped medical suite; can deploy a bucket and ladder to 50 feet (15 m) at up to 600 pounds (270 kg). A diving platform can be deployed to 10 feet (3.0 m) below the surface.
