= Sierra (motor ship) =

Historic ship

General characteristics
- Type: Motor ship
- Length: 218 ft (66 m)
- Beam: 42 ft (13 m)
- Depth: 15 ft (4.6 m)
- Propulsion: Motor
- Sierra (motor ship)
- U.S. National Register of Historic Places
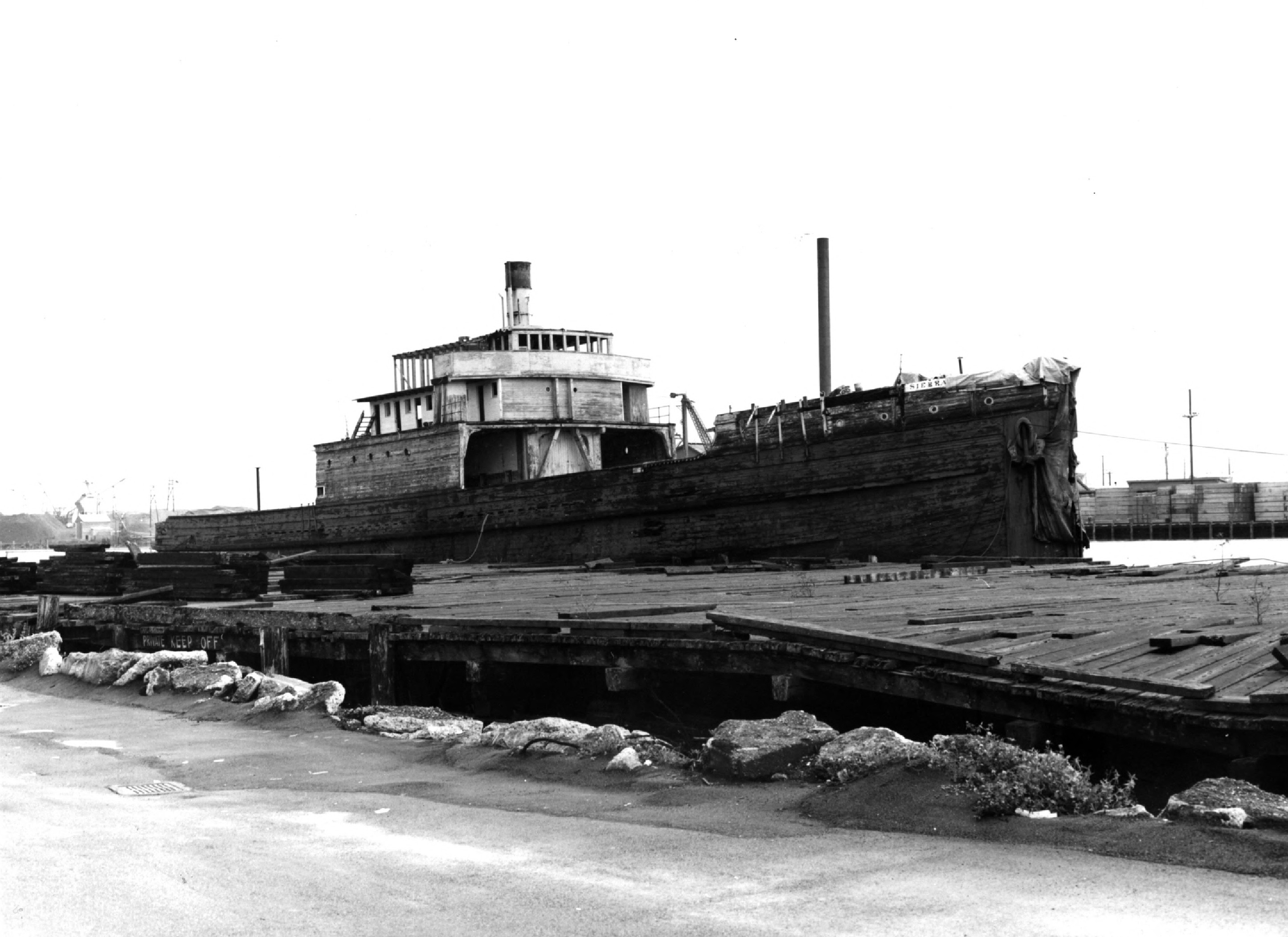
- Sierra

- Location within Washington (state) Location within the United States
- Location: 1401 Sargent Blvd., Aberdeen, Washington
- Coordinates: 46°58′31″N 123°48′02″W
- Built: 1916
- Built by: G. F. Matthews
- Architect: George H. Hitchings
- NRHP reference No.: 78002745
- Added to NRHP: March 29, 1978

Sierra is a historic motor ship used to transport lumber. Built in 1916, it was added to the National Register of Historic Places in 1978.

== History ==
Sierra was built at Matthews shipyard in Hoquiam for E. K. Wood Lumber Company and was the first motor ship built on Grays Harbor. The ship's engines were made in Sweden by Bolinder, which sent a representative to oversee their installation. Senator Miles Poindexter attended the ship's launch on August 30, 1916.

Its first long voyage was to Valparaíso, Chile. Sierra was able to complete the round-trip without refueling.

Sierra was used to ferry lumber between Bellingham, Washington and Hoquiam, Washington. In one month in 1920, Sierra carried a shipment of 1,200,000 feet of lumber out of Bellingham.

On Feb 7, 1923, Sierra was badly damaged after colliding with the steamship Wilhemina in dense fog near San Francisco; damages were estimated at $135,000.

In 1926, Sierra caught fire at Berth 77 in the Port of Los Angeles, the first fire fought by the fireboat Los Angeles City No. 2.

Sierra was sold in 1927 and equipped with refrigeration equipment to carry reindeer meat from Alaska for the Arctic Transport Company. During World War II, the U.S. Army operated Sierra as a training ship. After the war, Sierra was assigned to the Maritime Commission reserve fleet at Olympia, Washington, then later sold and transferred to Lake Union.

In 1964, the new owner began restoring Sierra to its original, lumber-carrying configuration.
