= Ralph J. Scott (fireboat) =

Historic LA Fire Department vessel

Coordinates: 33.741343°N 118.278950°W

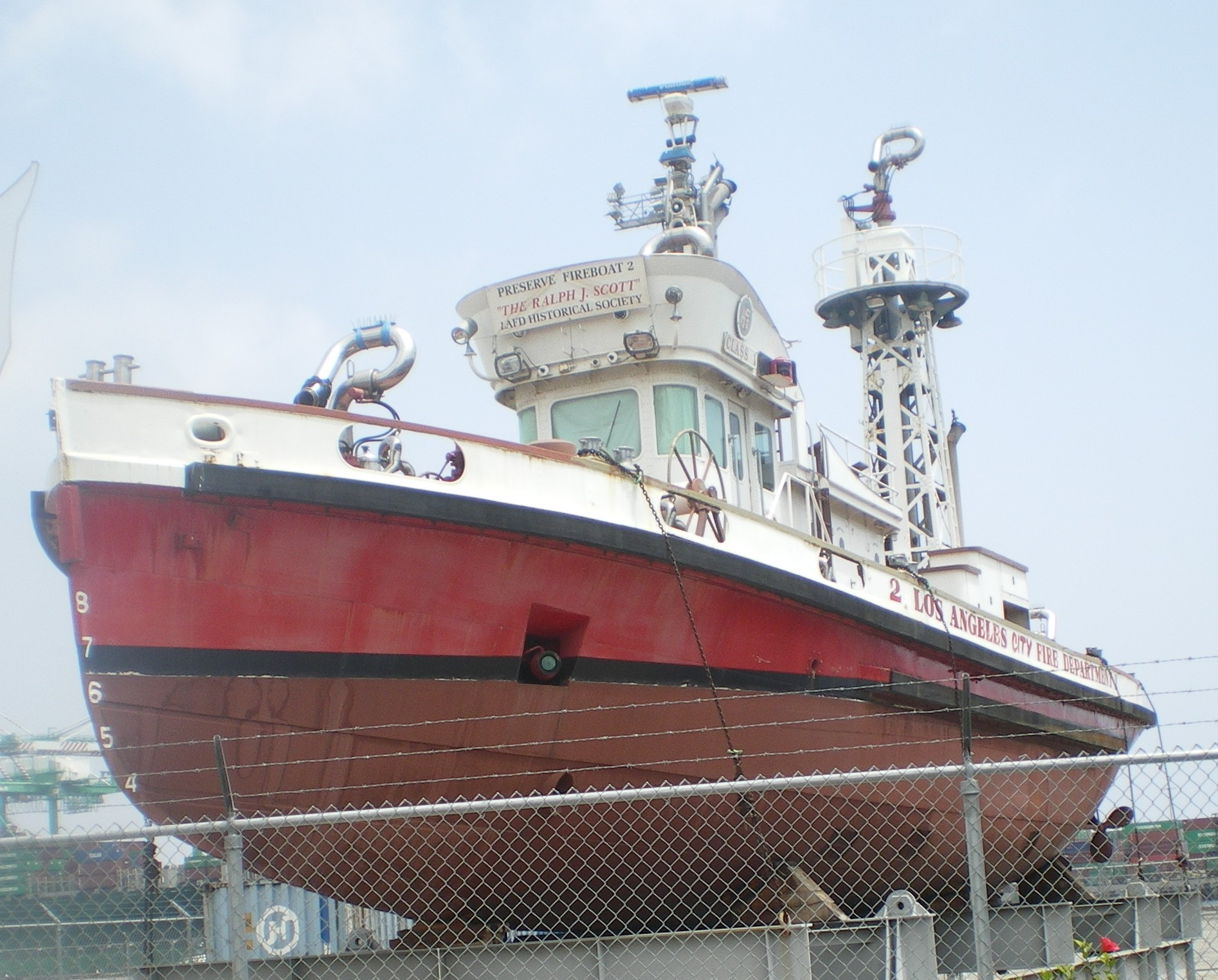

History

United States
- Name: Los Angeles City No. 2 (1925–1965); Ralph J. Scott (1965–)
- Builder: Los Angeles Shipbuilding & Drydock Company
- Sponsored by: Mrs. Ralph J. Scott
- Christened: 25 October 1925
- Commissioned: 2 December 1925
- Out of service: 2003
- Status: Awaiting restoration

General characteristics as built
- Type: Fireboat
- Tonnage: 152 GT
- Length: 99.3 ft (30.3 m)
- Beam: 19 ft (5.8 m)
- Depth: 9 ft (2.7 m)
- Installed power: As built: 7 × 350 hp (260 kW) 6-cyl. in-line Winton gasoline engines; Post 1945: 2 × 625 hp (466 kW) V-12 Hall Scott Defenders; 1 × 275 hp (205 kW) 6-cyl. in-line Hall Scott Invader
- Propulsion: Triple screw propellers
- Speed: 17 knots (31 km/h; 20 mph)

General characteristics 1945–c.1975
- Installed power: 2 × 625 hp (466 kW) V-12 Hall Scott Defenders; 1 × 275 hp (205 kW) 6-cyl. in-line Hall Scott Invader

General characteristics c.1975–
- Installed power: 2 × 700 hp (520 kW) V-12 Cummins diesel engines; 3 × 380 hp (280 kW) 6-cyl. in-line Cummins diesel engines; 2 × 525 hp (391 kW) V-12 2-cycle Detroit diesel engines
- Ralph J. Scott
- U.S. National Register of Historic Places
- U.S. National Historic Landmark
- Los Angeles Historic-Cultural Monument
- Location: Berth 85, San Pedro, Los Angeles
- Built: 1925
- Built by: L.A. Shipbuilding & Drydock Corp.
- NRHP reference No.: 89001430
- LAHCM No.: 154

Significant dates
- Added to NRHP: 30 June 1989
- Designated NHL: 30 June 1989
- Designated LAHCM: 5 May 1976

Ralph J. Scott, also formerly known as Fireboat #2, is a 100-foot (30 m) fireboat that was attached to the Los Angeles Fire Department serving the Port of Los Angeles. She was retired in 2003 after 78 years and replaced by Warner L. Lawrence. Ralph J. Scott is undergoing restoration near the Los Angeles Maritime Museum in San Pedro. On 30 June 1989, she was listed as a National Historic Landmark. She is currently located at the Los Angeles Fire Department, Fire Station 112, at 444 South Harbor Blvd, Berth 86, San Pedro, California.

== Description ==
She is 100 feet (30 m) long and can pump 17,000 US gallons per minute (1.1 m^{3}/s). Her namesake is a former Chief Engineer of the LAFD.

On 6 May 1924 voters approved a $400,000 bond issue for construction of a fireboat, a station to house it and auxiliary apparatus.

Following completion of L.E. Caverly's designs, dated 31 January 1925, a $214,000 contract was awarded to the Los Angeles Shipbuilding and Drydock Company in San Pedro. The contract called for a 1 October 1925 delivery date. On 25 October 1925, Mrs. Ralph J. Scott christened Los Angeles City No. 2.

Commissioned 2 December 1925, Los Angeles City No. 2 went into service with a crew of 14, including a captain, a pilot, a mate, two engineers and nine firemen.

The triple screw, white-painted fireboat was riveted steel construction. Her length is 99.3 feet, beam 19 feet, depth of hold 9 feet, 152 gross tons and fuel capacity 2,156 gallons.

Originally Los Angeles City No. 2 was powered by seven 350-horsepower, 6-cylinder in-line Winton gasoline engines. Three of these Wintons drove the center, port and starboard propellers for a top rated speed of 17 knots (31 km/h; 20 mph) (the fastest fireboat afloat). The four other Wintons operated the forward-mounted pumps. Increased pumping capacity resulted from the dual capability of the two wing propulsion engines when they were switched from propulsion to pumping mode. There are six Byron Jackson four-stage centrifugal pumps mounted in pairs forward of the propulsion system. Each is rated at 1,700 US gallons per minute (0.11 m^{3}/s) at 200 pounds per square inch (1,400 kPa), for a total output of 10,200 US gallons per minute (0.64 m^{3}/s).

In 1945 the seven Winton propulsion engines were replaced by Hall Scott engines. Two 625 horsepower (466 kW) V-12 Hall Scott Defenders drive the outboard screws. A 275 hp (205 kW) 6-cylinder in-line Hall Scott Invader drives the center screw.

The six Byron Jackson four-stage centrifugal pumps, mounted in pairs forward of the propulsion system are driven as follows:

- Pumps numbers 1 through 4 are driven by one of the 275 hp 6-cylinder in-line Hall Scott Invaders.
- Pumps numbers 5 and 6 are driven by one of the 625 hp V-12 Hall Scott Defenders.

Mounting 5 monitor guns, including a tower gun which could be extended 44 feet (13 m) above water level, Los Angeles City No. 2 was one of the first large fireboats powered by gasoline. Carrying 2,156 US gallons (8,160 L; 1,795 imp gal) of fuel, the fireboat featured a safety system that completely changed the air in the engine room every five minutes as a precaution against leaking gasoline vapors. A further safeguard against below-deck fires was a bank of 18 carbon dioxide extinguishing agent cylinders forward of the water tower.

Beginning in 1975 the gasoline engines were replaced with diesels and by 1978 two 700 horsepower (520 kW) V-12 Cummins, three 380 horsepower (280 kW) 6-cylinder in-line Cummins and two 525 horsepower (391 kW) V-12 2-cycle Detroits power the fireboat.

Ralph J. Scott carried breathing apparatus, forcible entry tools, heavy stream appliances, a bank of eighteen 50-pound (23 kg) CO_{2} cylinders (now removed), flood light, smoke ejector equipment, syphon ejectors, drag and grappling hooks, two 3 1/2-inch (89 mm) Mystery nozzles, and tips up to 6 inches for the largest deck turret. Four reels carry 4,000 feet (1,200 m) of various sized hose. She was equipped with 24 hose outlets (12 port and 12 starboard) and 5 large deck guns. Big Bertha, mounted on the wheelhouse could deliver 10,200 US gallons per minute (0.64 m^{3}/s) via a 6 inches (150 mm) nozzle. The tower turret, believed to be the first, or at least one of the first, fireboat towers in the nation, rises to a height of 42 feet (13 m) above the water.

== Notable fires ==
3 March 1926 Los Angeles City No. 2 battled her first major fire when the fully loaded lumber schooner Sierra burned at the E. K. Wood Lumber Company wharf, San Pedro. It took 26 Los Angeles city fire companies and 5 fireboats over two hours to extinguish this difficult fire in the San Pedro area. First arriving fire units reported 300 feet (91 m) of Berth 77 on fire and spreading to adjacent boats. Loss estimated to be over $1,500,000 to the wharf and six boats. No injuries were reported and the fire was under investigation.

July 1947 Los Angeles City No. 2 maneuvered alongside of Berth 154, the American President Lines pier and warehouse, where she succeeded in stopping the fire at this point. A secondary fire was the burning tanker, SS Markay. Los Angeles City No. 2 used her forward turret, Big Bertha and Rail Standees.

29 June 1954 Los Angeles City No. 2 was put in action during the fire at the San Pedro Marine Terminal of the Tidewater Associated Oil Co., cooling endangered tanks during a three-alarm fire. Starting at 6:25 p.m., explosions and fires quickly engulfed 11 of the 17 storage tanks in the facility. Moored beside the boat was Fireboat No. 3.

24 February 1967 Ralph J. Scott attacked simulated dock fires, berth 128. This was part of "Operation West Basin" training program.

20 June 1970 SS Pontos cargo ship fire, which occurred at Berth 49 at the harbor.

December 1976 The 60,000 ton oil tanker Sansinena explosion.

== Station ==
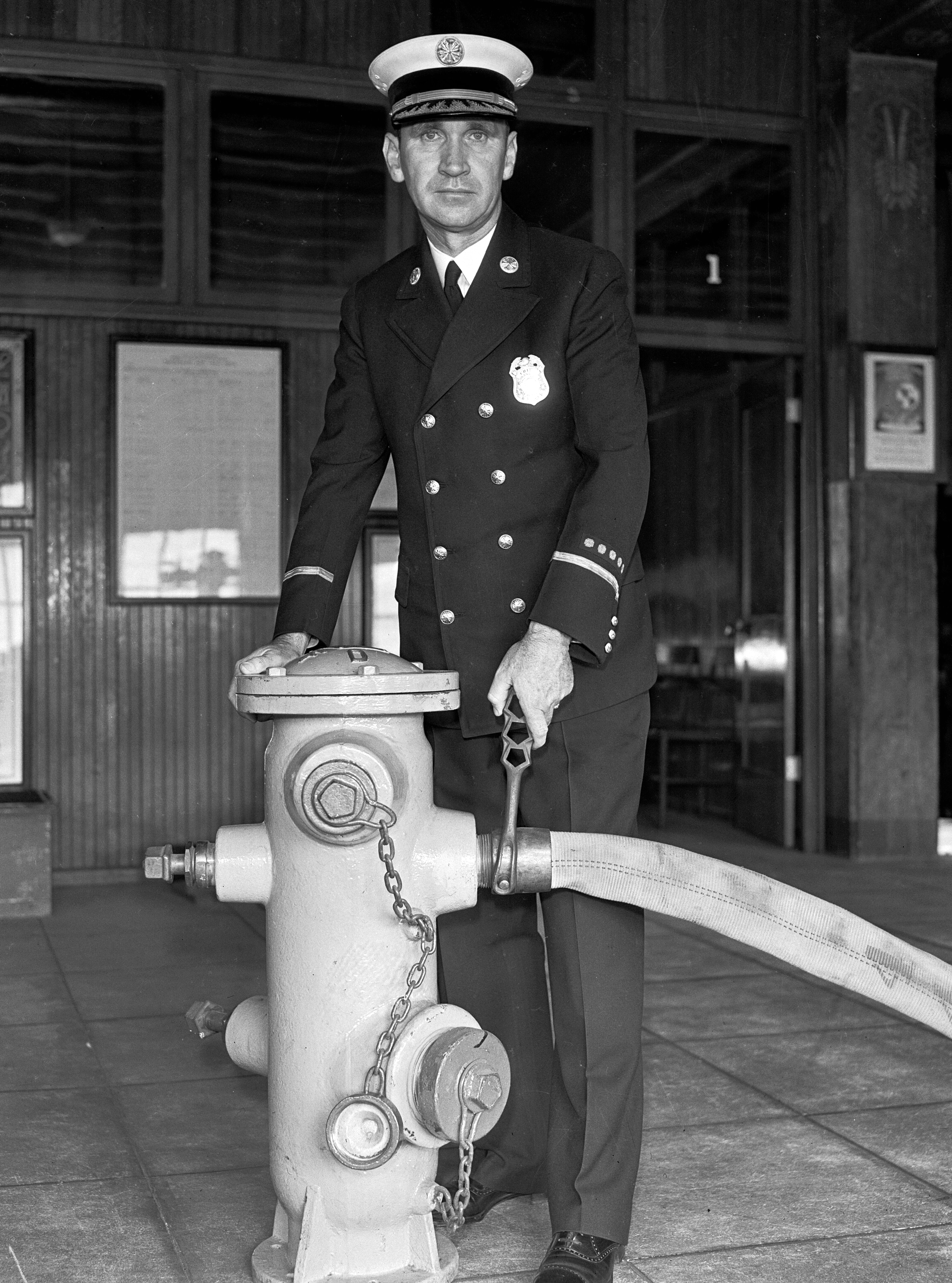
Chief Scott, the fireboat's namesake

One of the few covered boathouses built for American fireboats, Ralph J. Scott's original housing (later known as Fire Station 112) became a waterfront landmark until its demolition in 1986, to make way for a new cargo container complex.

The new, dramatic, award-winning building of Fire Station #112 was designed to shelter Ralph J Scott, while allowing for viewing by visitors. As of 2012, the weathered boat sits up in a cradle behind the station, awaiting funding and man-power necessary to complete the restoration process. The Port of Los Angeles is planning to develop a new facility to house the restored vessel.

Fire Station 112 has exhibits on the history of L.A. fireboats, and Ralph J. Scott in particular, explaining the construction and varied uses of this most unusual vessel.

== Appearances in popular culture ==
The fireboat was featured in Visiting... with Huell Howser Episode 414.

== See also ==
- List of Los Angeles Historic-Cultural Monuments in the Harbor area
