= Palisades Highlands, Los Angeles =

Neighborhood in Los Angeles, California

Coordinates: 34.1133°N 118.5431°W

View of the Highlands from a hiking trail in May 2026.

The Pacific Palisades Highlands is a neighborhood located in Pacific Palisades, a community in the Westside of Los Angeles, California. The Palisades Highlands is situated in the northern part of the Palisades bordering Topanga State Park and the Upper Santa Ynez Canyon. The Highlands has its own shopping center and access to several Topanga State Park trailheads.

== History ==
The mouth of Santa Ynez Canyon at the Pacific Ocean was once home of Inceville, an early 1900s film studio. Filming ceased at the property around 1922, and the buildings burned to the ground in 1924. In 1921, the land that is now known as Pacific Palisades was purchased by Methodists. Over time, roads that were named after Methodist missionaries were developed, and land was settled.

In 1964, W. Charles Chastain of Sunset International Petroleum Corporation purchased 3,550 acres of land in the Upper Santa Ynez Canyon. He envisioned a development dubbed "Sunset/Mountain Park" which would feature thousands of residential units, and an early proposal even depicted a 22-acre man-made lake. The project was renamed to the Palisades Highlands in 1966, and was heavily scaled down over the years due to heavy community opposition. The Highlands development finally began construction in the early 1970s under a new company led by Chastain called Headland Properties. The first completed stage consisted of the Woodies condominiums and several single family homes in 1972. A gated community known as the Country Estates followed in 1976. From the late 70s to early 80s, several more condominium "villas" were completed as well as several single family homes, and a commercial center initially called Highlands Village. Highlands Village featured a small market, services, and offices, and later a restaurant. The Final stages were completed with the Palisades Hills in the 1980s, and the large Summit community in the 1990s and early 2000s. The Summit was built at the highest point at the northeast border between Pacific Palisades and Topanga State Park. The foot of the Highlands was also developed in the 1980s, with several more condos, a church with a private school, a much larger shopping center called Highlands Plaza, and several affordable housing units. The Highlands are the most recent large-scale development in Pacific Palisades. In May 2021, a large brush fire broke out along Michael Lane in the Highlands, and burned 1,220 acres. A luxury senior living complex called Ciela opened in the Highlands in 2023, after years of community push back. In 2025, the massive Palisades Fire started by the Summit, and destroyed thousands of homes in the greater Pacific Palisades, including hundreds of homes and condos in the Highlands. Rebuilding efforts have remained steady but very active since. The Highlands Village is actively being redeveloped after the fire as Highlands Circle, which will feature new cafes/restaurants, another small market and several shops and services.

=== Controversy ===
The development was originally protested by area residents and environmentalists because it cut through the heart of Topanga Park.

== Features ==
The Palisades Highlands currently features several shops and dining in the Plaza, including Spruzzo Restaurant, Moku Sushi, Cafe Vida (Opening November 2026), Palisades General Store, Palisades Wine and Spirits, Starbucks Coffee, Sanctuary Spa and Nails, Sherwin Williams, and more. There are several notable hiking trails and parks like Santa Ynez Canyon Park, Trailer Canyon Trail/Fire Road, Temescal Ridge Trail/Skull Rock, and Fire Road/Top of the World Trail. Most residences have exclusive access to private recreation centers, which can feature amenities like pools, a gym, clubhouse, tennis courts, and play areas. The Highlands is highly popular for its peaceful, quiet, mountainous setting while maintaining very close proximity to the beach and city.
