= Old Plaza Firehouse =

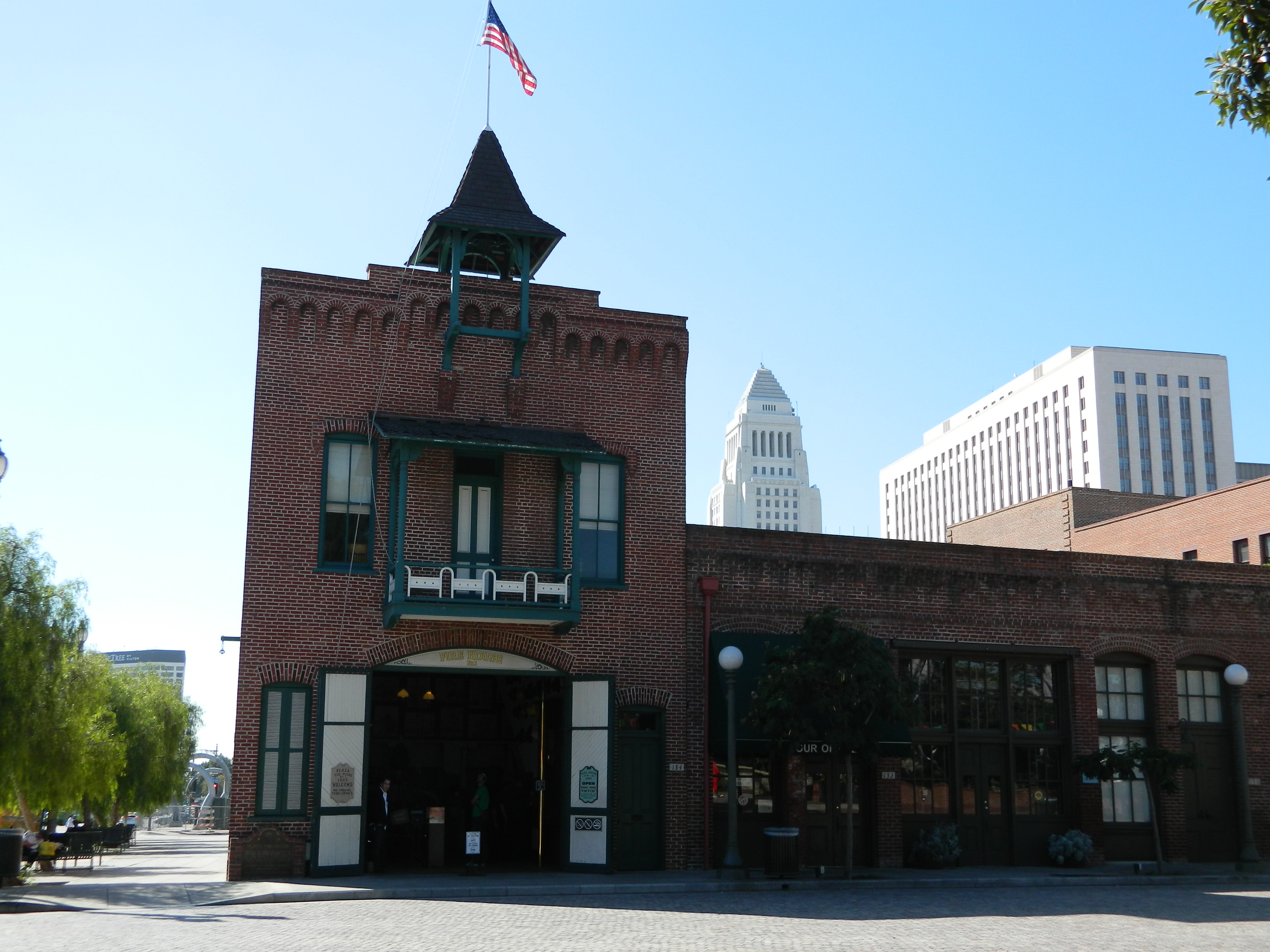
- Old Plaza Firehouse with Los Angeles City Hall in the background.

- Location within the Los Angeles metropolitan area
- 34°03′22″N 118°14′20″W
- Location: 501 N. Los Angeles Street, Los Angeles CA

History
- Built: 1884

California Historical Landmark
- Designated: April 8, 1960
- Reference no.: 730

The Old Plaza Firehouse, also known as Fire House No. 1 and the Plaza Fire House, is the oldest fire station in the city of Los Angeles, built in 1884, two years before the formal establishment of the Los Angeles Fire Department. It is located near Olvera Street in the Los Angeles Plaza Historic District. It was named California Historical Landmark No. 730 on April 8, 1960.

Designed by local architect William A. Boring [the City paid him $160.75 for his drawings], and built in 1884, it operated as a firehouse until 1897. The building was thereafter used as a saloon, cigar store, poolroom, "seedy hotel", Chinese market, "flop house", and drugstore. The building was restored in the 1950s and opened as a firefighting museum in 1960.

The Plaza Firehouse Museum is open to the public Tuesdays through Sundays from 10 a.m. to 3 p.m. The museum features helmets, photos, and firefighting equipment of the late 19th and early 20th centuries.

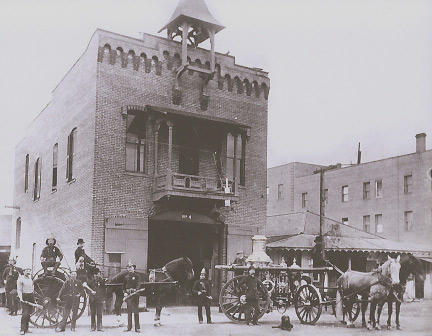
Los Angeles Fire House 1890

== Markers ==
- The plaque reads:
- Dedicated to the firemen of the Los Angeles Fire Department--past, present and future--who since 1871, by their courage and faithful devotion to duty, have protected the lives and property of the citizens of Los Angeles from the ravages of fire.
- NO. 730 OLD PLAZA FIREHOUSE - Dedicated to the firemen of the Los Angeles Fire Department-past, present, and future-who, by their courage and faithful devotion to duty, have protected the lives and property of the citizens of Los Angeles from the ravages of fire since 1871. This was the first building constructed as a fire station in Los Angeles. Built in 1884, it served as a firehouse until 1897. After this it was used for various purposes until restored in 1960 and opened as a museum of fire-fighting equipment of the late 19th century.
