= Engine Company No. 28 =

- U.S. National Register of Historic Places
- Los Angeles Historic-Cultural Monument
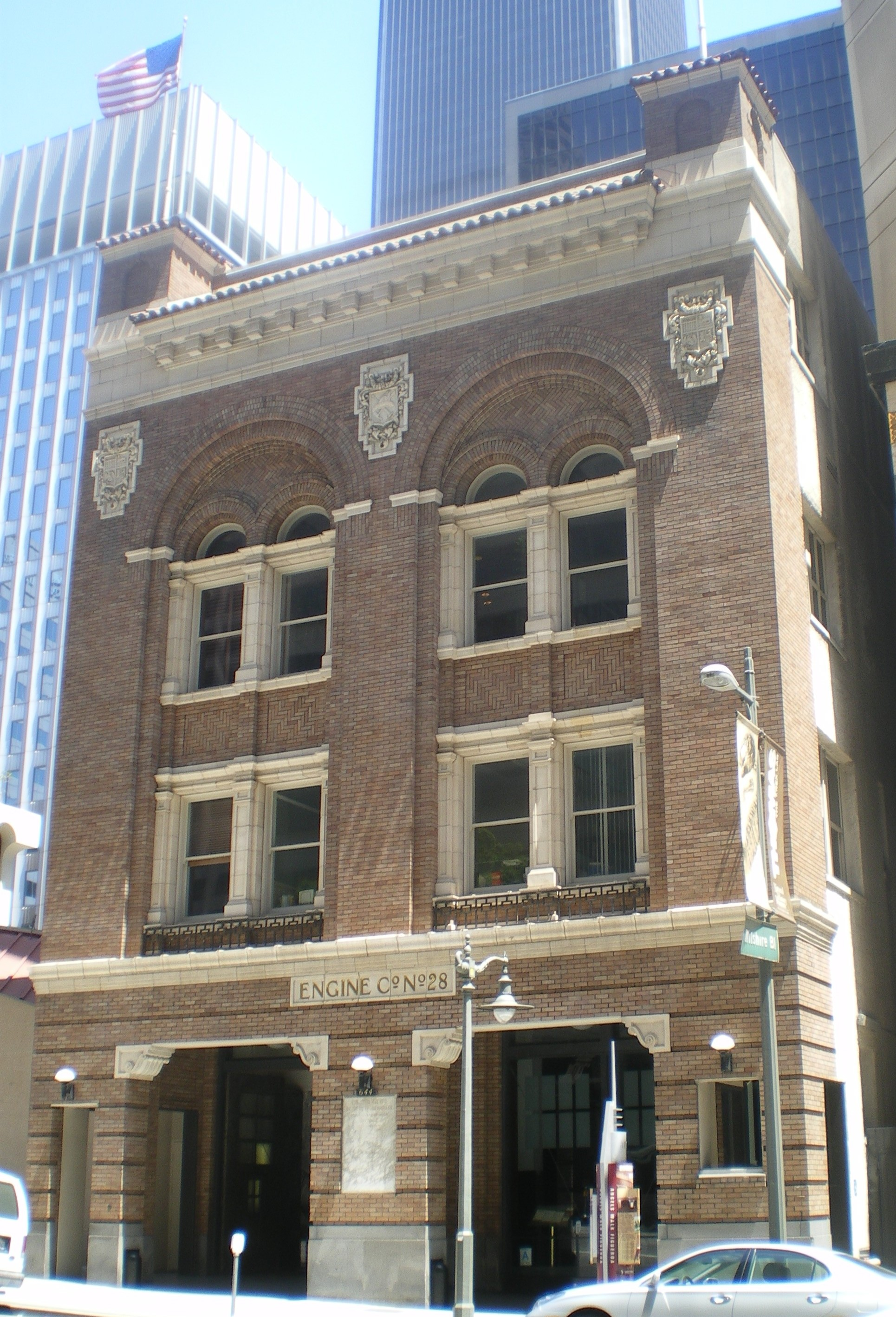
- Engine Co. No. 28 in 2008

- Location within the Los Angeles metropolitan area Location within California Location within the United States
- Location: 644–646 S. Figueroa St. Los Angeles, California
- Coordinates: 34°2′59″N 118°15′30″W
- Built: 1912
- Architect: J.P. Krempel, W.E. Erkes
- Architectural style: Renaissance
- NRHP reference No.: 79000485
- LAHCM No.: 348
- Added to NRHP: November 16, 1979

Engine Company No. 28 is a former Los Angeles Fire Department fire station on Figueroa Street in Downtown Los Angeles. Built in 1912 at a cost of US$50,000, the structure served as an operating fire station until it was closed in 1967. One of the first reinforced concrete fire stations in the city, it is a Class A fire-proof structure built of brick, hollow tile and concrete. In 1979, the building was listed in the National Register of Historic Places.

In the late 1980s, it was renovated as a restaurant, "Engine Company No. 28.", that served food based on recipes from American fire houses.

The building was featured as an operating fire station in Los Angeles in the 2011 video game L.A. Noire.

Since 2007, the building has housed the law firm Geragos & Geragos, and is owned by Mark Geragos.

== See also ==
- List of Registered Historic Places in Los Angeles
