= Los Angeles Plaza =

Historic plaza in Los Angeles, California

Coordinates: 34.056944°N 118.237778°W

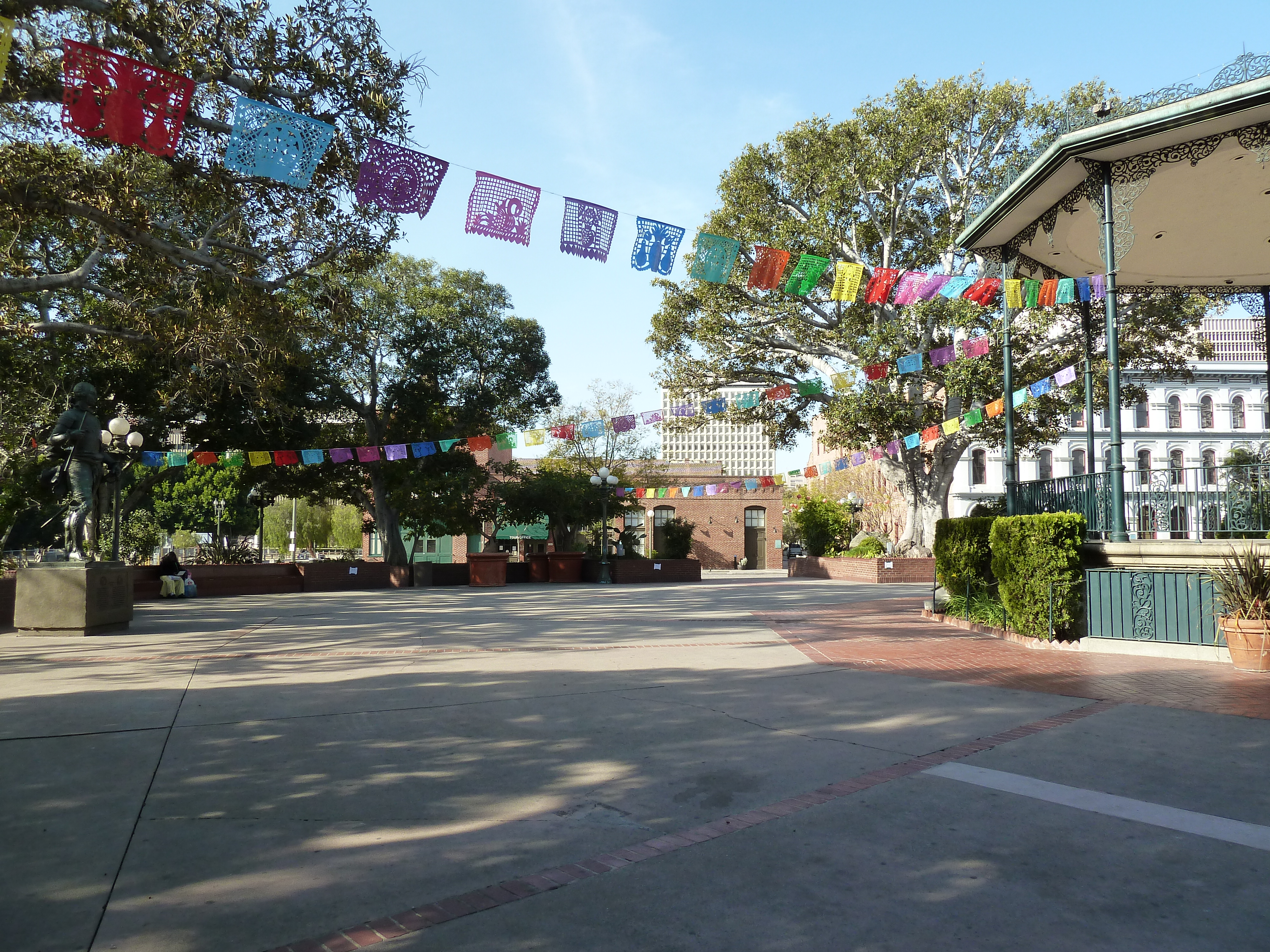
Los Angeles Plaza, Easter Sunday, 2012

Los Angeles Plaza or Plaza de Los Ángeles is located in Los Angeles, California. It is the central point of the Los Angeles Plaza Historic District. When Spanish Governor Felipe de Neve founded the Pueblo de Los Ángeles, his first act was to locate a plaza for the geographical center from which his town should radiate. De Neve's plaza was rectangular in form—75 varas wide by 100 in length. It was located north of the church; its southerly line very nearly coincided with the northerly line of West Marchessault street. On this, the cuartel (guard house), the public granary, the government house and the capilla (chapel), fronted.

It is located just north of the original village site of Yaanga, which was used as a reference point in the construction of the plaza.

== 18th century plaza ==
The 18th century plaza vieja (old plaza) predates the 19th century plaza nueva. The old plaza of El Pueblo de Nuestra Señora, La Reina de Los Angeles (the town of our Lady, the Queen of the Angels) as decreed by Gov. Felipe de Neve in his "Instruccion para La Fundaccion de Los Angeles" (26 August 1781), was a parallelogram one hundred varas in length by seventy-five in breadth. It was laid out with its corners facing the four winds or cardinal points of the compass, and with its streets running at right angles to each of its four sides, so that no street would be swept by the wind. Two streets, each ten varas wide, opened out on the longer sides, and three on each of the shorter sides. Upon three sides of the plaza were the house lots, 20x40 varas each, fronting on the square. One half of the remaining side was reserved for public buildings—a guard house, a town house, and a public granary; the other half was an open space. Around three sides of the old plaza clustered the mud-daubed huts of the pioneers of Los Angeles, and around the embryo town, a few years later, was built an adobe wall—not so much perhaps for protection from foreign invasion as from domestic intrusion. It was easier to wall in the town than to fence in the cattle and the goats that pastured on the ejidos or commons, outside the walls. The boundaries of the plaza vieja, as nearly as it is possible to locate them, are as follows: The southeast corner of the plaza would coincide with the northeast corner of Marchessault and Upper Main streets. From the said northeast corner of these streets draw a line land boundaries were of rare occurrence and title deeds when given were loosely drawn. The more or less in a conveyance never worried the party of the second part. In the minutes of the ayuntamiento may be found the grant of a certain piece of land now known as the Requena tract which is described and deeded as that lot or tract on which the "Cows ate the apples".

== 19th century plaza ==
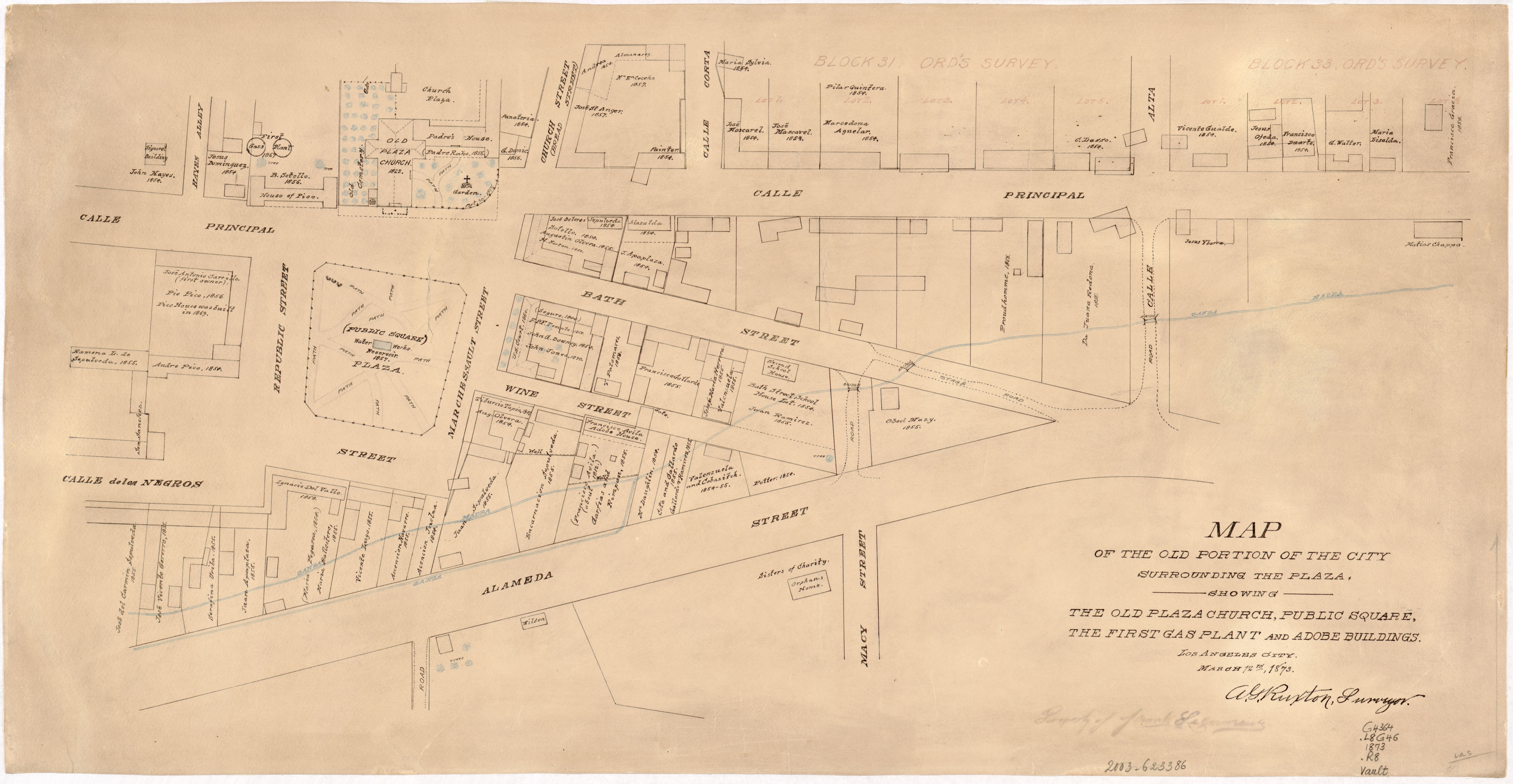
1873 map of the Plaza, including course of Zanja Madre

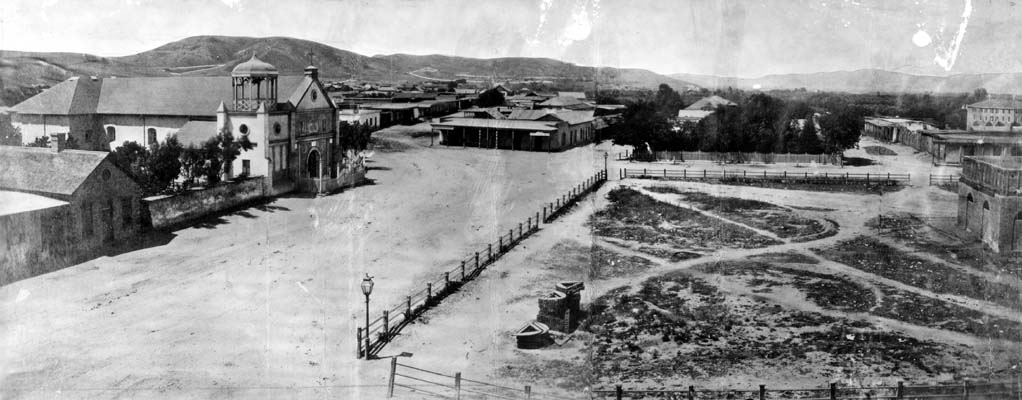
Los Angeles Plaza (1869)

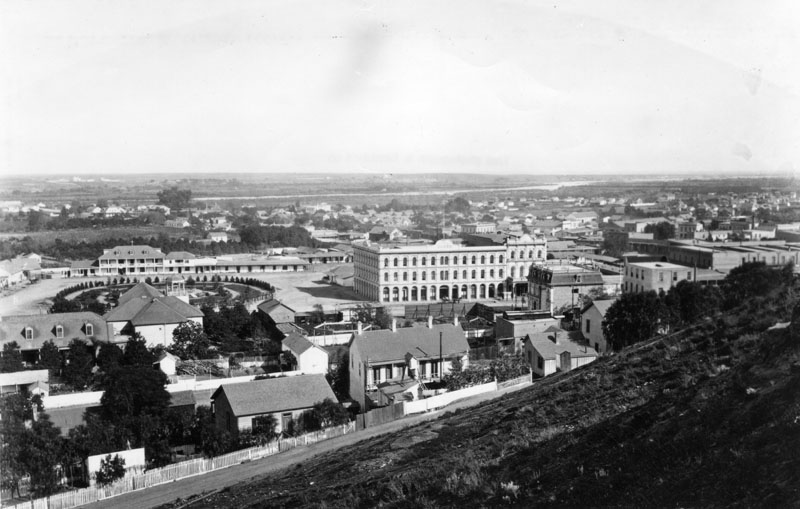
Los Angeles Plaza (1876)

Los Angeles Plaza and Pico House (1890)

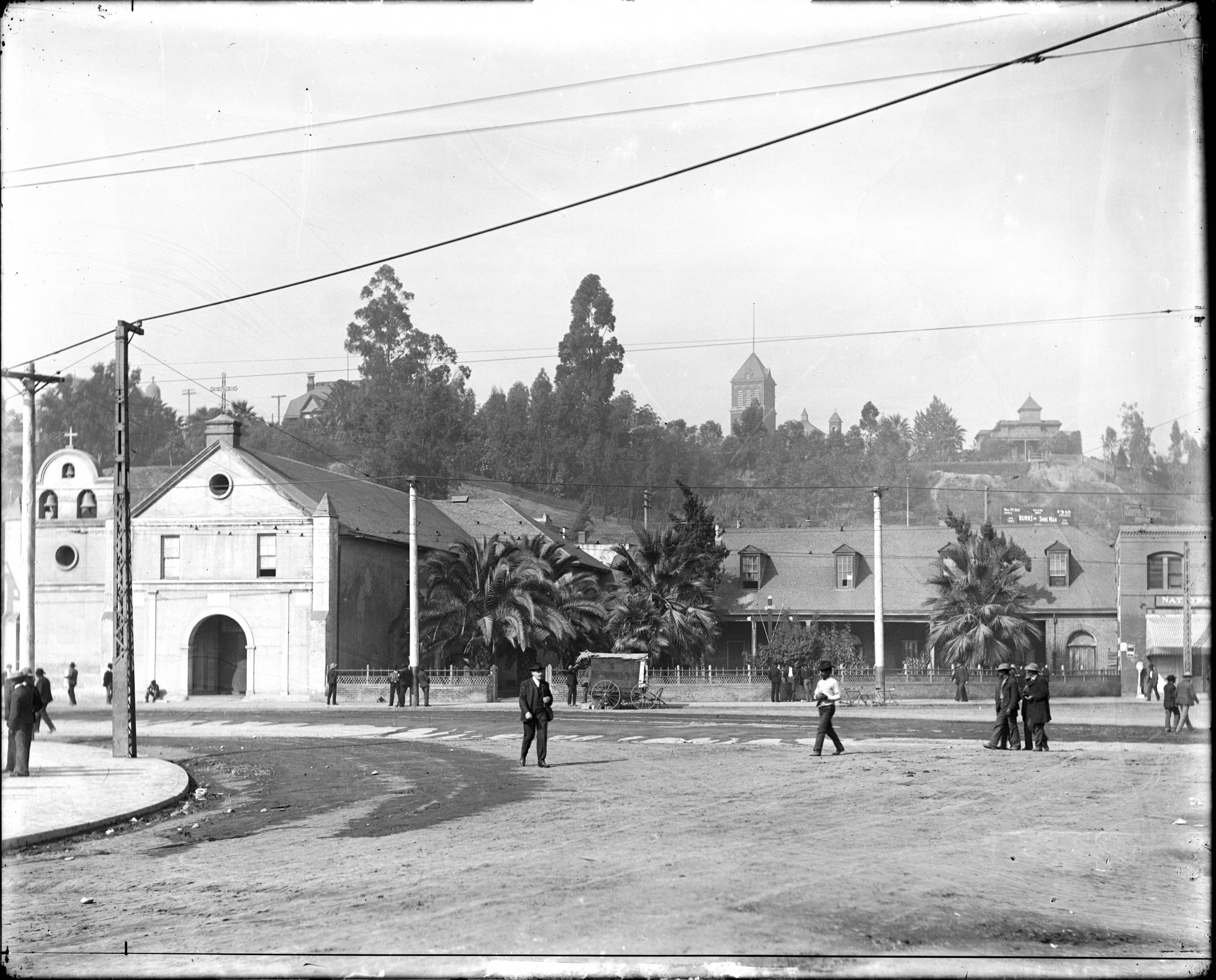
Los Angeles Plaza (c. 1905)

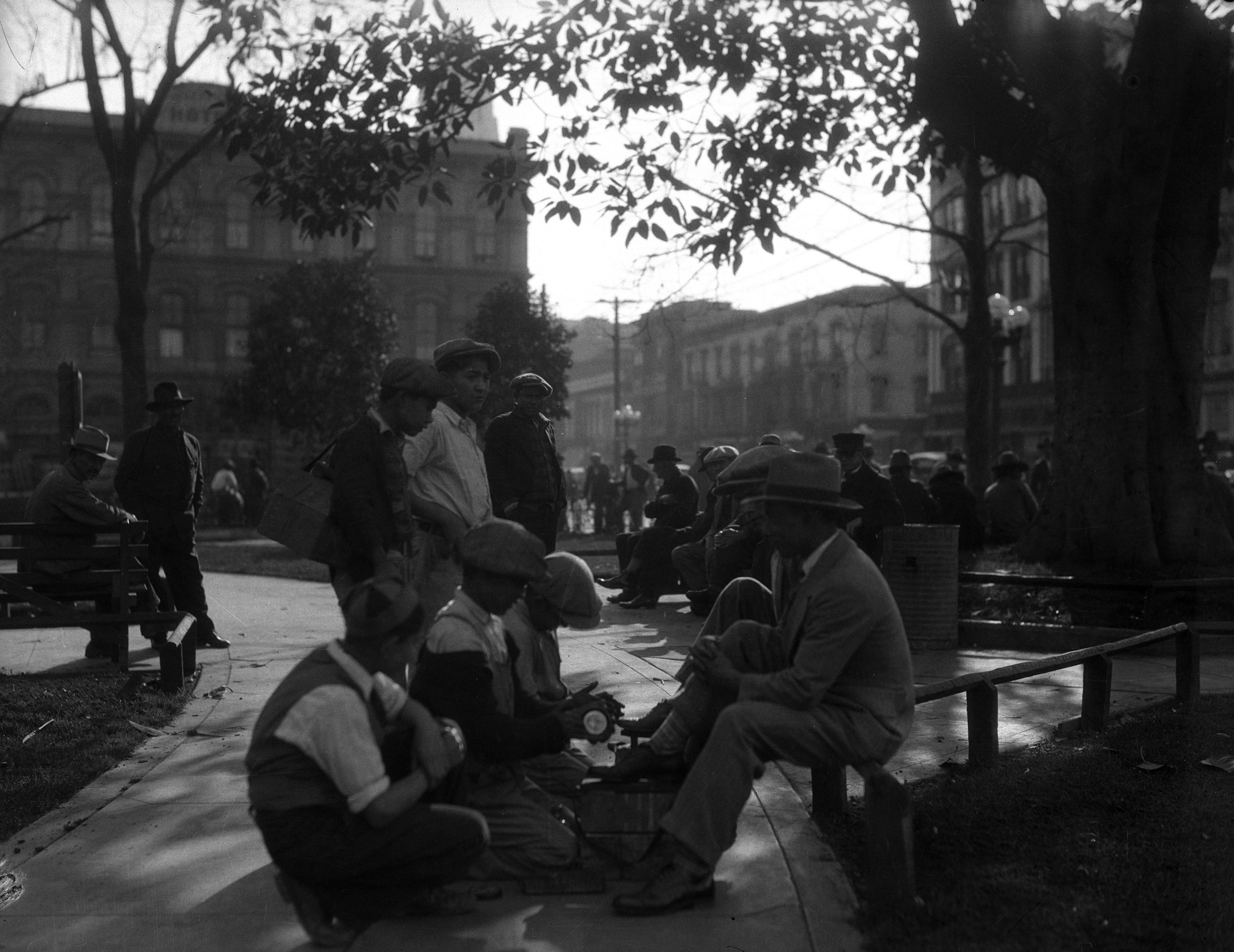
Los Angeles Plaza (1930)

In 1814, when the foundation of the La Iglesia de Nuestra Señora la Reina de los Ángeles was laid, it, too, fronted on the old plaza; but the great flood of 1815 changed the Los Angeles River’s channel from the eastern side of the valley to the western and the waters came up to the foundations. The location of the church was changed to higher ground—its present site. When the final location of the Nueva Iglesia had been decided upon by Gov. Sola in 1818, next in importance was a plaza on which the church should front and since there was none, the evolution of plaza from the ejidos or common land and house lots began. There were evidently some buildings on the designated area, for old records note that the pueblo authorities, in 1825, ordered a house torn down that stood on the plaza.

Previous to 1818, the trend of the pueblo’s growth had been to the northward, but after the location of a site for the new church had been determined the movement to the southward began. June 21, 1821, Jose Antonio Carrillo, one of the aristocrats of the ancient pueblo regime, petitioned the Comisionado for a house lot near the “new temple which is being built for the benefit of our holy religion.” A lot 40x60 varas (the present site of the Pico House) was granted him. On this lot between 1821 and 1823 Carrillo built, for that time, a notable residence, Carrillo House, fronting it on the plaza. Plaza fronts became the fashion with the pueblo aristocracy; and in course of time the homes of the Picos, the Carrillos, the Sepulvedas, the Olveras, the Lugos, and the Abilas were clustered around the square.

There seems to have been no “plano” or plot made of the new plaza. The building line zigzagged. A moderate deviation was not noticed, but if someone built out too far, the authorities pulled down his residence. In 1838, the city authorities ordered Santiago Rubio's house demolished “to maintain the Plaza line.” When the vacant lots with Plaza fronts were all built upon, the irregular shape of what was originally intended to be a square became more noticeable. So the Ayuntamiento (Council) set to work to solve the problem of squaring the Plaza, but it proved to be a difficult problem. Commissioners were appointed and they labored faithfully to evolve plans to remedy “certain imperfections which have been allowed to creep into the form of the Plaza through carelessness; and to add to the beauty of the town by embellishing the Plaza.” But they encountered opposition to their efforts.

Pedro Cabrera's house lot fell within the line of a street that it was proposed to open out to the westward from the Plaza. The Commissioners offered him a larger and better lot in exchange, but Pedro declined the offer. He wanted a Plaza front and the new lot had none. Then the Commissioners offered him another lot and for damages the labor of the chain gang for a certain number of days. But Pedro was inexorable, so the street had to take a twist around his lot, and the twist gave the Calle Iglesia (Church street), now West Marchessault. By reducing its dimensions and by giving the lot owners who had built back the land between them and the new building line the Ayuntamiento succeeded in partially squaring the Plaza. The north, south and west lines, after squaring, were each 134 varas or about 380 feet in length and the east line was 112 varas or 330 feet long. At that time Los Angeles Street (or Vineyard street, as it was then called) ended at Arcadia Street and the principal entrance into the Plaza from the south was the Calle de Los Negros.

During the time of Spanish and Mexican domination in California, the Plaza was a treeless common; its surface pawed into ridges or trodden into dust by the hoofs of the numerous mustangs tethered on it or ridden over it. It had, however, its annual spring cleaning and decoration for the festival of Corpus Christi. For a decade or more after the American occupation its appearance was unchanged. The first attempt at its improvement was made by the city authorities in 1859. It was enclosed by a picket fence, walks were laid off and some shrubbery planted. But in those days the city exchequer was in a chronic state of collapse and the improvements made were not kept up. The Plaza gradually lapsed into its former state of dilapidation. On July 22, 1868, the city of Los Angeles entered into a contract with John S. Griffin, P. Beaudry, and Solomon Lazard for a thirty years’ lease of the city water works. One of the conditions of that lease was the building within a year at a cost not to exceed US$1,000 of an ornamental spring fountain on the Plaza. Juan Bernard and Patrick McFadden, who had acquired possession of the Dryden franchise and water works, disposed of their system and the old brick reservoir on the Plaza came into the possession of the City Water Company, the successors of Griffin, Beaudry, et al. Three years passed, and still the unsightly debris of the old reservoir disfigured the center of the square. At a meeting of the council, December 2, 1870, Judge Brunson, attorney of the City Water Company, submitted propositions as a settlement of what he styled “the much vexed question of the reservoir and Plaza improvements. The council, frightened at the prospect of a lawsuit and fearful of losing the Plaza, hastened to compromise. The fence was built, the walks were laid, and the ornamental fountain, too, was erected by the company. Its form was changed from a square to a circle.

== Los Angeles Plaza Park ==
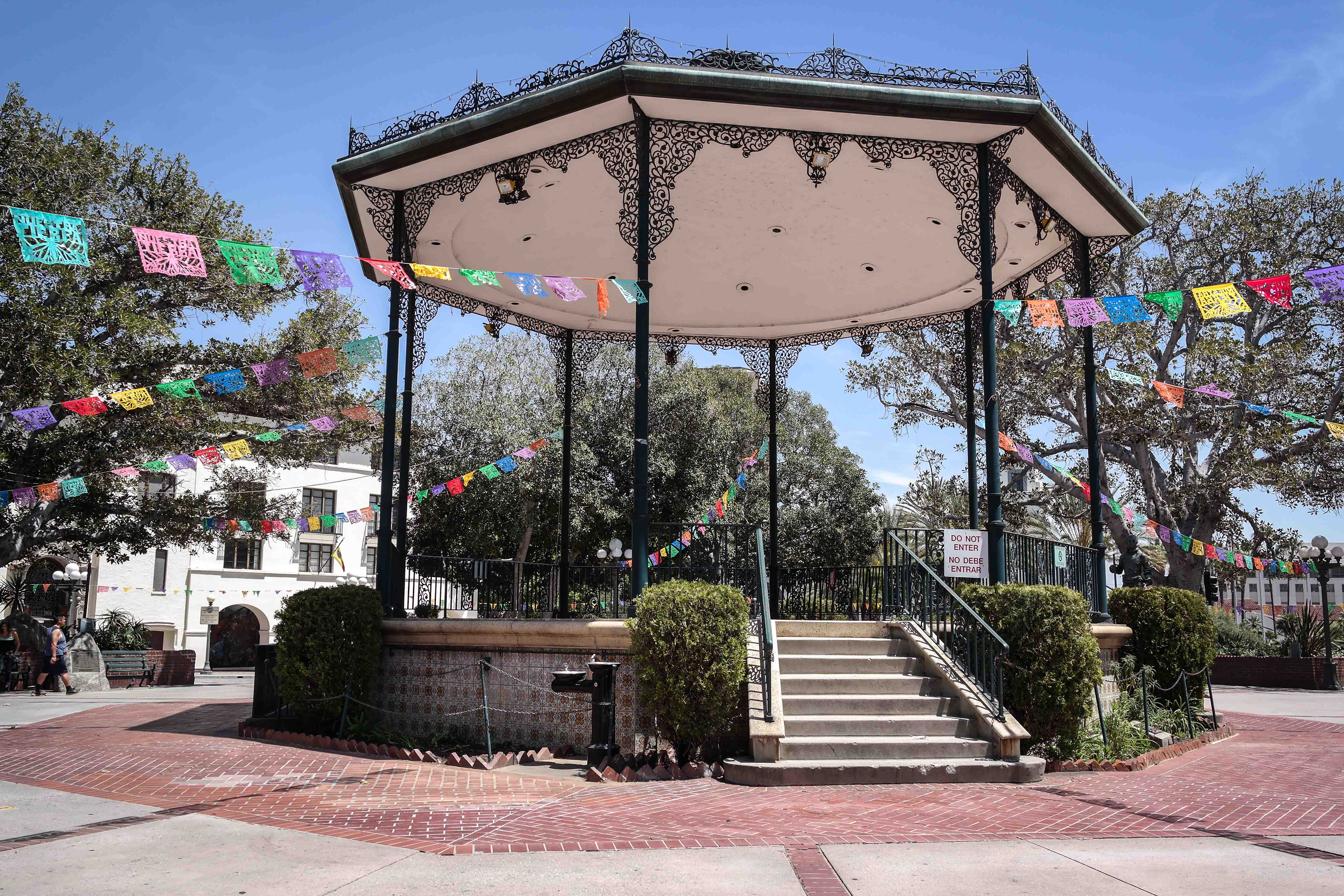
Los Angeles Plaza Park, 2014

Los Angeles Plaza Park is an unstaffed, unlocked and open area within the plaza. It is the site of the demolished Lugo Adobe.

== California Historical Landmark ==
The Los Angeles Plaza was designated a California Historic Landmark (No.156) on Jan. 11, 1935. The Marker on the site reads:

- NO. 156 LOS ANGELES PLAZA - A part of the original pueblo lands of El Pueblo de la Reina de Los Angeles de Porciuncula founded in 1781 under the Spanish Laws of the Indies during the reign of King Carlos III, the plaza is located close to the site of the original plaza. It was the center of the settlement founded by Governor Felipe de Neve. When the Plaza Church was completed in 1822, this site was reserved as a public plaza. It was landscaped in 1871 and has served since that date as a public park.

== Map ==
Below is a map of the Plaza area with streets and monuments marked as they appeared in the 1880s.

==== Abbreviations and notes ====
- d = demolished
- Italics indicate buildings or streets that no longer exist
- "Female boarding" was a euphemism for small rooms, "cribs", used by prostitutes.

CALLE CORTA/SHORT/ BELLEVUE/ SUNSET
now CÉSAR CHÁVEZ AVE

616–620
pre-1890: #16–20 Sentous Block
1886–1950s/
now parking lot

600–8
Chester House
lodgings p1906
now parking lot

M
A
I
N

S
T
R
E
E
T
former MACY ST.
former MACY ST.
A
L
A
M
E
D
A

S
T
R
E
E
T
former MACY ST.
UPPER MAIN ST.—>
a.k.a.
SAN FERNANDO ST.
a.k.a.
NORTH SPRING ST.

17
Pelanconi House 1850s–pres

La Golondrina restaurant 1924–pres

V
I
N
E
or
W
I
N
E

since
1877
O
L
V
E
R
A

12
Sepúlveda House 1887–pres

10
ÁVILA ADOBE 1818–pres
oldest house in Los Angeles

Plaza Substation 1905-pres

Olvera House 19th c.–pres

115 E
pre-1890: #99–#115
Agustín Olvera adobe
"Chinese quarters" p1888
Methodist Church 1926

125 E
Eugene Biscailuz Bldg 1926–pres

L
O
S

A
N
G
E
L
E
S

S
T.

1888–
1950s

Pironi & Slatri wine & brandy vaults & distillery p1888

813–23
"Female Boarding" p1906
now Placita Dolores park

L. A. City Water Co.
now Placita Dolores park

850

Institución Caritativa/
Orphan Asylum 1852–91/
Lumber yard & mill p1906/
now Mozaic Apts

former APABLAZA ST.

OLD CHINATOWN
19th c.–1930s d/
UNION STATION
1939–pres

BREAD/CHURCH/MARCHESSAULT/SUNSET
now PASEO LUIS OLIVARES

former MARCHESSAULT ST.
now PASEO DE LA PLAZA (pedestrian)

former MARCHESSAULT
now LOS ANGELES ST.

former MARCHESSAULT
now station driveway

525–41
1814/1861–pres:
OUR LADY QUEEN OF THE ANGELS CHURCH

L. A. Gas Light Co.
gas plant 1867-?

507–11N
House of Pío Pico
1814/1861–pres GARNIER BLOCK
a.k.a. Plaza House
p1888 Plaza Hotel
p1955 County offices
2011–pres La Plaza de Cultura y Artes

501–5
House of Jesús Domínguez
1888–pres Vickrey-Brunswig Bldg
p1955 County offices
2011–pres La Plaza de Cultura y Artes

LOS ANGELES PLAZA

This block: "Chinese businesses" p1888

Ascensión Jerelna res. 1854-?

Ascensión Navarro res. 1855-?

510–526
VICENTE LUGO ADOBE 1840s-1951d

c.504–8
Ignacio Del Valle adobe 1858-1880s

now Yaanga Park

"Chinese
theater"
p1888–1906

757–767
"Chinese
tenements"
p1888–1906

745–753
"Female
boarding"
p1888–1906

OLD CHINATOWN
19th c.–1930s d/
UNION STATION
1939–pres

ex-BRIDGE ST. 1850s/ HAYES ALLEY/ SONORA ST./ REPUBLIC ST.

former REPUBLIC/PLAZA ST.
now PASEO DE LA PLAZA (pedestrian)

former FERGUSON ALLEY c.1888–c.1951

former SHAFER ST.

411–427
pre-1890 numbering 291–305
1853 Hayes adobe, Jail
p1870s Felix Signoret Bldg
p1853 Montgomery House gambling saloon
p1888 Hotel Oxford
hotel p1894, p1906 Hoffman House
now parking lot

late 19th c. Russian Baths

369–75
pre-1890: #275–9
p1884–92:
California Stables

424–440
Carrillo House 1821-1869d/
PICO HOUSE 1869/70–pres
National Hotel p1894–1906

418–422
Merced Theater 1870–pres It
theater 1871–7
part of National Hotel p1894–1906

412
Firehouse p1894

Nick Covarrubias livery stable p1881

R. M. Baker Bldg p1881–d
now Hollywood Fwy

S
Á
N
C
H
E
Z

501
p1853: Ocampo Plaza
1884–pres: Old Plaza Firehouse

res p1853: Leandro Ocampo
1884–pres: Old Plaza Firehouse

425
p1906 d Opium joint
now part of Chinese American Museum

409–23
1890–pres Phillipe Garnier Bldg
p1894–1906 "Chinese stores, tenements"
now Chinese American Museum

401–7
1840-1888 Coronel Adobe/
p1894 Jeanette Block
p1894 Hotel Lion D'Or

L
O
S

A
N
G
E
L
E
S

S
T.

CALLE DE LOS NEGROS
site of Chinese Massacre 1871

Juan Apaplaza res 1855-?

Serafina Uriba res 1855-?

José Vic. Guerrero res 1855-?

José Sepúlveda res 1855-?

"Chinese gaming" p1888

"Chinese quarters" p1894

400–6
201–9 E. Aliso
Wilcox Block c.1889/93–?
Hotel de Grenoble p1906

211–9 E. Aliso
Beaudry's Block,
Au Gamin De Paris p1862
Hotel De Gap p1906

now parking lot and freeway onramp

B
A
U
E
R

A
L.

711–31 rear
p1894:
"Female
boarding"

701–7
p1888:
Italian
Hotel
p1894:
Café des Alpes

CAMINO PARA SAN GABRIEL 1850s/ ALISO ST. now Arcadia St & U. S. 101

"Female Boarding"

Hotel de France

now UNION STATION

now Hollywood Freeway (US 101)

ARCADIA ST.

BROAD PLACE 1850s–1888
Frémont's Troops
now Arcadia St. & U. S. 101

for the area to the south, see Victorian Downtown Los Angeles
