= Merced Theatre (Los Angeles, California) =

First theatre built in Los Angeles, California

Merced Theater
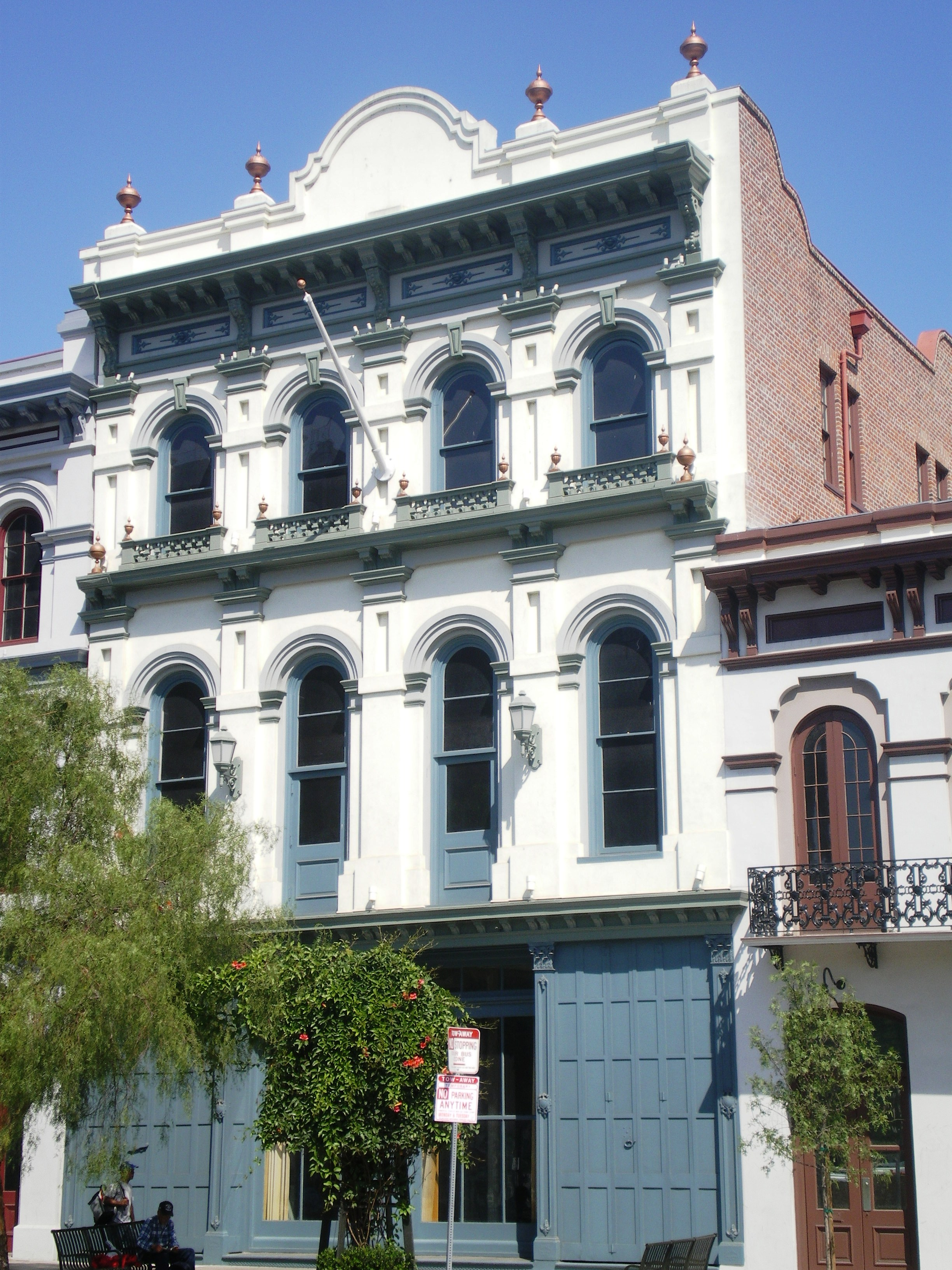
- Merced Theater in Los Angeles Plaza

- Location within the Los Angeles metropolitan area
- 34°03′22″N 118°14′23″W
- Location: 420 Main St, Los Angeles

History
- Built: 1870

California Historical Landmark
- Designated: March 6, 1935
- Reference no.: 171

The Merced Theater (building also once known as the Merced-Abbott Building) is a building in the City of Los Angeles. It was the first theater in the Pueblo of Los Angeles. The theater is located at 420 North Main Street (8–10 Main Street in the pre-1890 numbering scheme). It is immediately to the south of Pico House, and thus just off Los Angeles Plaza, the city's historic main square. The theater was designated a California Historical Landmark (No.171) on March 6, 1935.

== Architecture ==
The Merced Theater is built in a brick Victorian Italianate style. It was designed by Ezra F. Kysor (1835-1907) who also designed the Pico House.

== History ==
In 1849, cabinetmaker William Abbott, moved to Los Angeles from St. Albany Indiana, establishing himself as a member of the city's elite. In the 1850s, Abbot purchased lots in El Pueblo de la Reina de Los Angeles, the heart of the Spanish colonial and Mexican city. He purchased two adjacent lots, running his furniture business in one, with plans to build a theater in the other. In 1869, he began construction on the theater, naming it after his wife, Merced or Mercedes Garcia.

Mercedes Garcia was born to powerful Los Angelenos José Antonio Garcia and María Guadalupe Uribe. She married Abbott in 1856. Mercedes Garcia additionally worked at the Sister's School in Los Angeles, teaching decorative arts and music. Mercedes Garcia Abbott ran the theater, seeing an opportunity to bring high arts to the plaza and establish her own social position.

Another three-story building in the plaza, the Merced Theater was designed to rival the Pico House. The first floor of the theater continued to serve as William Abbot's furniture store, the second functioned as the theater, and the third floor was the Abbott family's home. As the theater was also next door to the Pico House, there were doors connecting the two buildings, to allow patrons to move between the two structures.

Merced Theater offered live theatre from January 30, 1871, to 1876, then moved to minstrel and burlesque shows. When the Wood's Opera House opened nearby in 1876, and there was an outbreak of smallpox, the Merced ceased being the city's leading theatre. The Merced closed in 1877; it was used for informal entertainment events. In the 1880s, the Merced Theater gained a reputation for hosting "disreputable dances."

The building also housed retail stores, including Barker and Allen, forerunner of Barker Bros., which would go on to be a regional furniture chain.

In the 1960s and in the 1980s, the theatre had renovations inside and outside. From 1985 to 2014, the theatre remained vacant. Current renovations are working on use for broadcast TV studio use.

== Founder ==
William Abbot and his parents came from Switzerland. William Abbot married Maria Merced Garcia in 1858. Maria Merced Garcia grew up in El Pueblo de Los Ángeles. They had eleven children.

== Marker ==
Marker on the site reads:

- NO. 171 MERCED THEATRE – The Merced Theatre was built in 1870 and is one of the oldest structures erected in Los Angeles for the presentation of dramatic performances. It served as the center of theatrical activity in the city from 1871 to 1876. The theatre was built by William Abbot, the son of Swiss immigrants who settled in Los Angeles in 1854. In 1858, he married the woman for whom he would name the theatre, Maria Merced Garcia, the daughter of Jose Antonio Garcia and Maria Guadalupe Uribe, who were long-time residents of the Los Angeles pueblo.

== See also ==
- California Historical Landmarks in Los Angeles County
- List of ranchos of California
