= Signoret =

Signoret is a surname of French origin. Notable people with this surname include:

- Felix Signoret (1825–1878), American politician
- Gabriel Signoret (1878–1937), French silent film actor
- Simone Signoret (1921–1985), French actress
- Victor Antoine Signoret (1816–1889), French pharmacologist, physician and entomologist
