= Alexander Hope =

Alexander, Alex or Alec Hope may refer to:

- A. D. Hope (Alec Derwent Hope, 1907–2000), Australian poet and essayist
- Alexander Beresford Hope (1820–1887), British author and politician
- Alex Hope School
- Alexander Hope (British Army officer) (1769–1837), British general and politician
- Alexander W. Hope (died 1856), Los Angeles County sheriff and California state senator
- Alexander Campbell Hope (1894–1978), farmer and politician in British Columbia, Canada
- Alex Hope (songwriter) (born 1993), Australian songwriter

== See also ==
- Hope (surname)
