= Bell Block (Los Angeles) =

Building in Los Angeles, California

Coordinates: 34.0541117°N 118.2401598°W

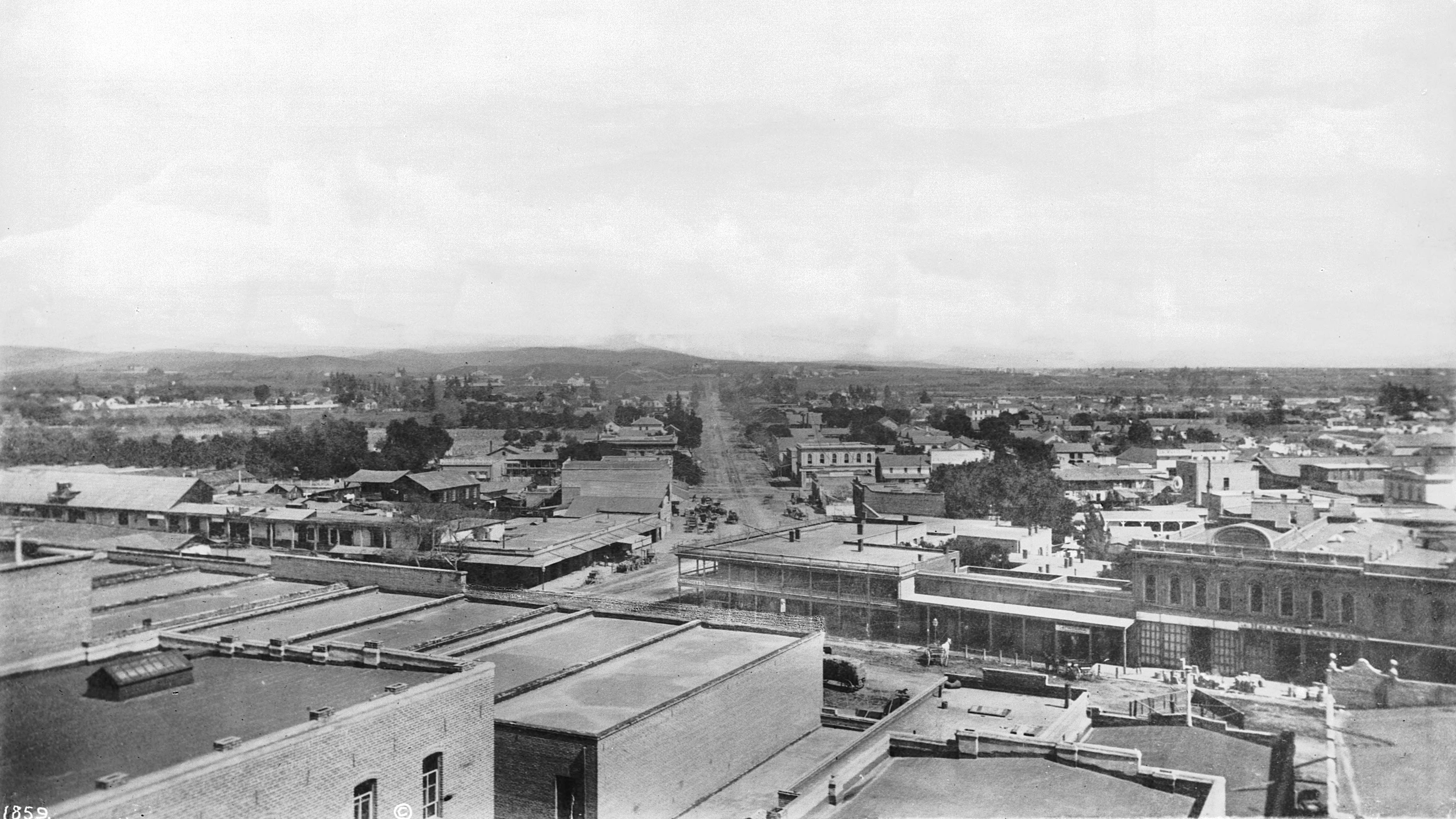
Aliso and Los Angeles streets in 1885

Bell Block (originally, “Bell’s Row”) was a building in Los Angeles in the U.S. state of California. Situated on the corner of Aliso and Los Angeles streets, it was built in 1845 by Captain Alexander Bell. It was one of the few two-story adobe buildings in the then one-story adobe town of Los Angeles.

== History ==
The early archives in the Recorder’s office of Los Angeles county, show that Don Jean-Louis Vignes sold a lot to Bell in 1844, “contiguous to the Zanja (water-ditch) and fronting the house of Senora Teodocia Saiz, which extended 95 varas on the east, 105 on the west 3 Los Angeles street, about 292 feet;. 80 varas on the north, or about 222 feet on Aliso street, and 88 varas on its south side,” or adjoining Dona Teodocia's place, which was where the “White House” stood. The deed, which is written in the Spanish language (probably by Don Ygnacio Coronel, is acknowledged before “Manuel Requena, Alcalde I O constitucional: Jues de I 0 instancia, y presidente del Y1. 0 Ayuntamiento de la ciudad de Los Angeles, etc., Abril 1, 1844.” It was witnessed by Casildo Aguilar and Juan Domingo; and a note was appended that the instrument was written on common paper for lack of stamped paper. It was known to be under construction by Bell in 1845. The upper story on the corner and fronting Aliso street was long the residence of Bell, and also, for a considerable period, of Francis Mellus. Of the tenants who occupied the corner store in early times when it was a central and very prominent corner, there were the dry goods merchants, Lazard & Kremer, Lazard & Wolfskill, S. Lazard & Co., Lazard & Meyer, Kalisher & Wartenburg, and later, for a number of years, this corner was occupied as a butcher shop by the Sentous Bros. In the latter part of Bell's life, he sold portions of the south end of his lot to Mr. Heinsch, and perhaps others. As the portion of the block which he retained came to need repairs, and as the much of improvement seemed to demand a better building, he was in doubt whether or not he would tear down the adobe and replace it with a brick block. As his available finances would not justify so expensive an undertaking, he finally put up a brick facing around the adobe walls of his block and made other improvements costing approximately US$12,000 or $15,000. It was demolished in December 1892 to make room for the foundations of a new brick block covering the former site and extending forty or fifty feet, or more, westward to the new line of Los Angeles street.

== Architecture ==
The two-story portion of the building only extended along the Aliso street front; and a part of the Los Angeles street front. The balance of the latter to the south consisted of a one-story row of stores, which were occupied by small dealers for many years. There was a spacious area back of the block which included a small flower garden and orangery near the zanja.
