= Carrillo House =

Historic house in Los Angeles, California, US

Coordinates: 34.056564°N 118.239464°W

Carrillo House was a historic house in Los Angeles, California, US. The Pico House now stands on its lot.

== History ==
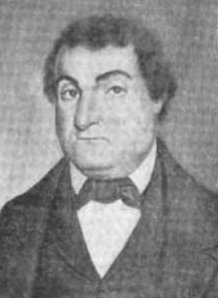
Engraving of Californio politician José Antonio Carrillo who made Los Angeles the capital of Alta California.

On June 21, 1821, Jose Antonio Carrillo petitioned the Comisionado for a house lot near the "new Temple which is being built for the benefit of our holy religion." The lot, 40x60 varas (114x170 feet) was granted the next day. This is the only record of a grant of a house lot made between 1786 and 1836—just one real estate transfer in fifty years. When Lieutenant Edward Ord made his plan of the City of Los Angeles in 1849, he took as the initial point of his survey the northwest corner of Carrillo's house that stood on this lot; and his bearings from a point opposite that corner gave direction to the lines of the city's streets, and virtually to the plan of the town. The building was begun in 1822 and completed in 1825. It was the most pretentious and aristocratic residence in the Pueblo de Los Ángeles at that time. Many entertaining occurred at the Carrillo house, as well as political discussions as its owner was a politician and an entertainer. The spacious ballroom was known for its dances; Pio Pico, Carrillo's brother-in-law, married Maria Ignacia Alvarado in the Carrillo House in 1834 with the merriment continuing for eight days. For four decades, Carrillo and his family resided at the abode, but it was abandoned in 1862 following Carrillo's death. It was then purchased by Pico who razed the building in September 1869, and built Pico House, a brick and stucco hotel, which opened on June 19, 1871.

== Architecture ==
The adobe residence fronted on the plaza. It featured wings extending back on Main Street, and from its eastern end, to an adobe wall in the rear, thus enclosing a patio or inner court. Although but a one-story building, its height gave it the appearance of a two-story house. Its high gabled roof of red tiles and its white walls were in contrast to the prevailing clay-colored fronts and the flat asphalt roofs of the neighboring houses.
