= Alexander W. Hope =

American politician (1826–1856)

Alexander W. Hope (c. 1826 – January 17, 1856) was a medical doctor and druggist. He was Los Angeles County sheriff in the 1850s, a state senator, a member of the Los Angeles Common Council and the organizer of the first American law-enforcement group in the city, the forerunner of the Los Angeles Police Department.

Hope was born in Virginia and died January 1856 in Los Angeles.

In a special election on October 7, 1850, Hope won a seat on the Los Angeles Common Council, the city's governing body. His term ended on May 7, 1851. He also was a member of the California State Senate that year, resigning on January 11.

On June 4, 1851, Mayor Benjamin Wilson appointed him to organize and lead a volunteer force of city peace officers, to be known as the Los Angeles Rangers. One hundred men were enlisted at the first meeting in the Montgomery House a popular hotel and saloon operated by Billy Getman, and twenty-five of them were chosen to work full time. On August 1, 1853, a barracks was established for the force. Writer Larry Goldberg noted that:

The rangers wore badges of woven white ribbon bearing the words "City Police Organized by the Common Council of Los Angeles, July 12, 1851" and "Policia Organizado por el Consejo Comun de Los Angeles." The all volunteer force supplied their own firearms. Horses, tack and other necesities [sic] were supplied by the city or its citizens.

Hope was thus noted as the first police chief for the city of Los Angeles after the American occupation.

He returned to the Common Council in 1854 when he won another special election on August 16, for a term that ended on May 9, 1855.

== Legacy ==
Hope was buried on Fort Moore Hill, and Hope Street in Downtown Los Angeles was named in his memory.
