= Lugo Adobe =

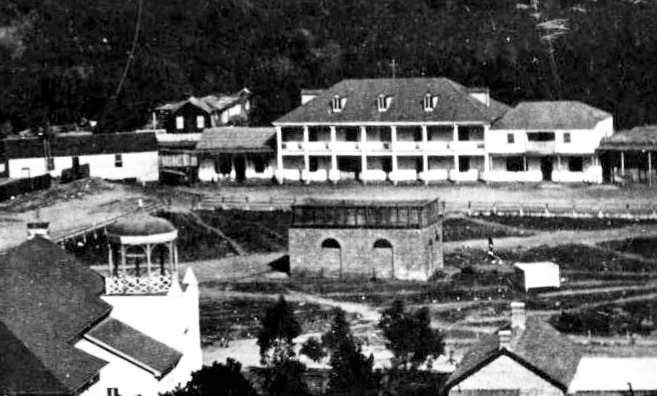
- Lugo Adobe

- Location within the Los Angeles metropolitan area
- 34°03′23″N 118°14′18″W

History
- Built: 1840s
- Demolished: 1951

California Historical Landmark
- Designated: July 12, 1939
- Reference no.: 301

The Lugo Adobe also called the Vicente Lugo Adobe or Casa de Don Vicente Lugo was a house in the city of Los Angeles, located on the east side of the Los Angeles Plaza at 512–524 N. Los Angeles Street.

Don Vicente Lugo of the prominent Lugo family of California built the home in what is now called the El Pueblo de Los Ángeles Historical Monument in the 1840s. The Lugo Adobe was designated a California Historic Landmark (No. 301) on July 12, 1939. Lugo Adobe was one of the very few two-story homes in the Pueblo of Los Angeles. In 1867 Don Vicente Lugo donated the Adobe to St. Vincent's School, that later became Loyola Marymount University. St. Vincent's School used the building for two years before moving the School. The building became part of what is now called Old Chinatown, Los Angeles. When Old Chinatown became run down, Los Angeles put into place a redevelopment plan. The California Historic Landmark given to the Lugo Adobe did not save the Adobe from redevelopment. The Lugo Adobe was demolished in 1951, despite significant efforts to save it.

The site of the former Lugo Adobe is now Yaanga Park on the east side of the Los Angeles Plaza and the east side of N. Los Angeles Street, just west of Union Station and just east of the southern end of Olvera Street.

== Gallery ==
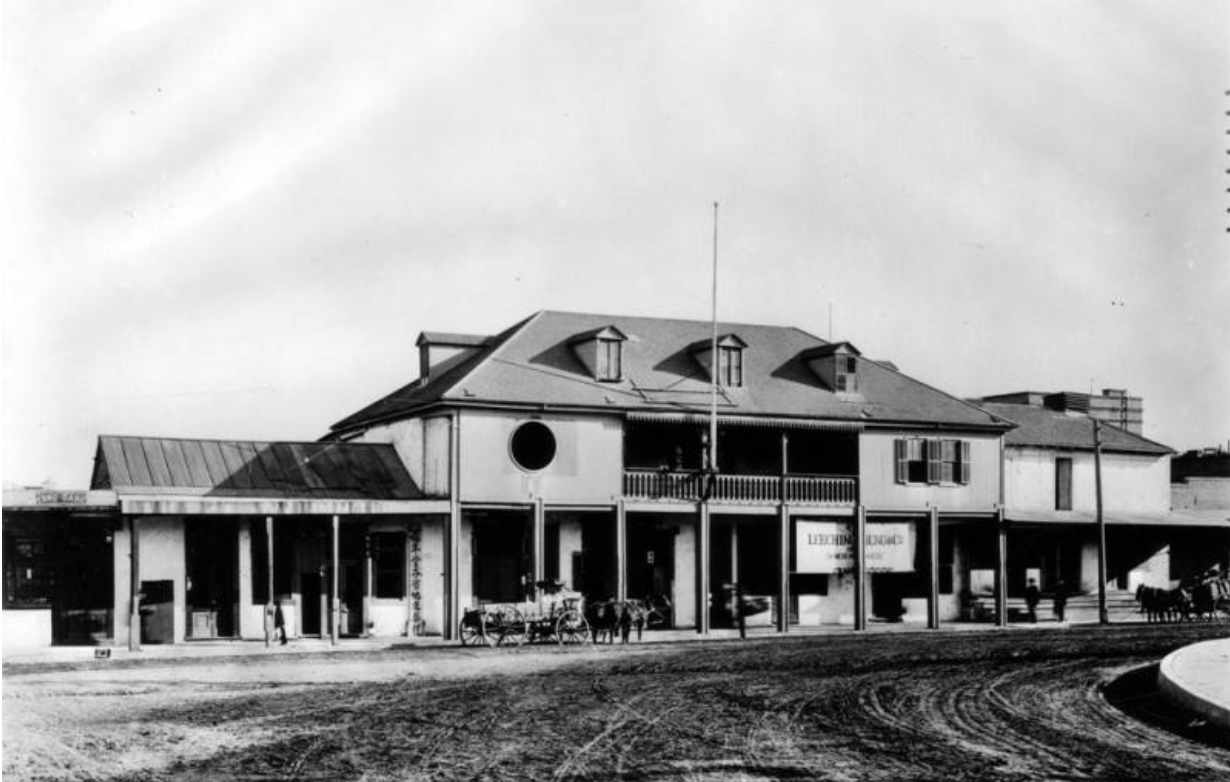
Lugo Adobe housing Leeching Hung & Co., date unknown

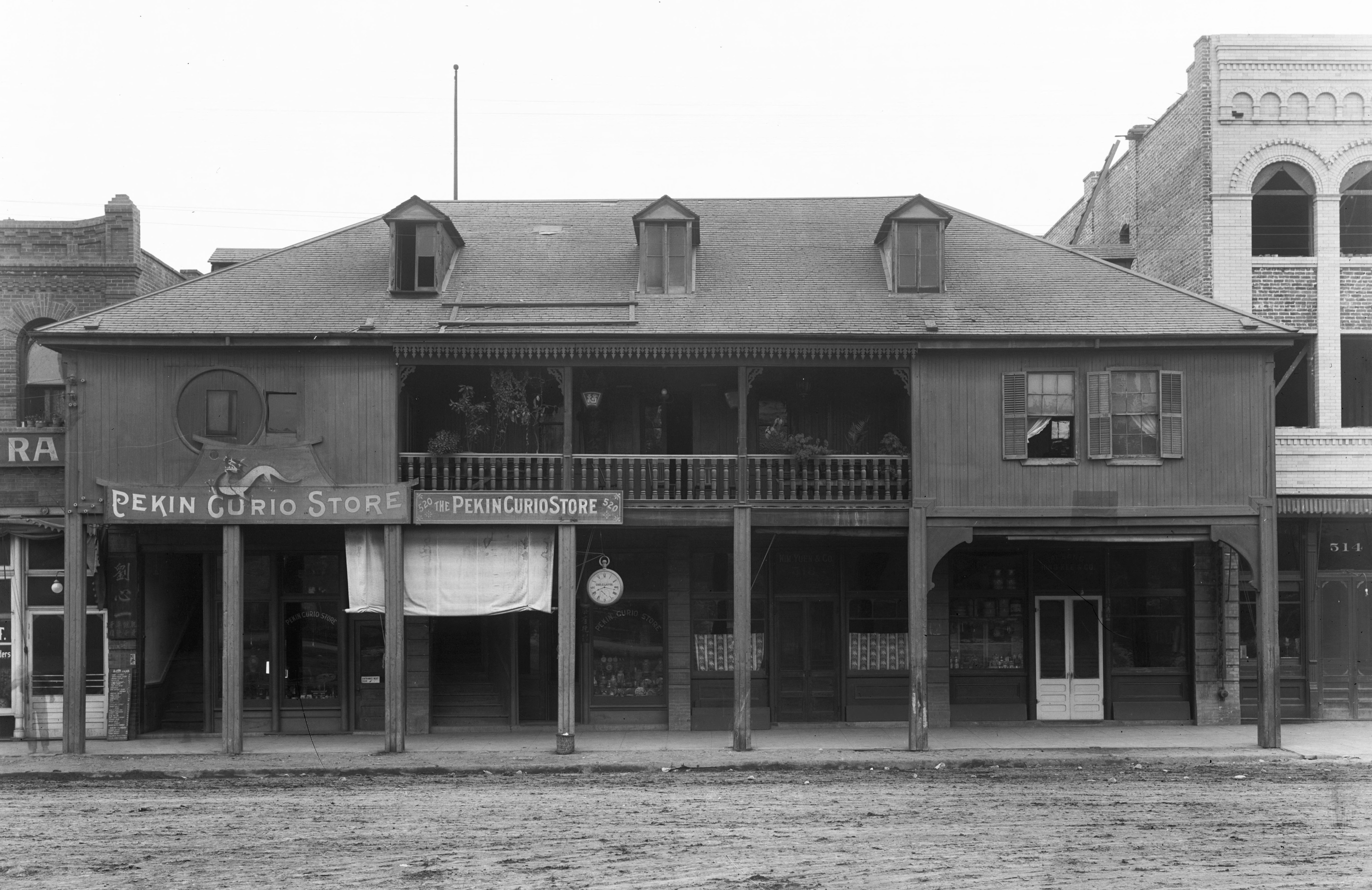
The Lugo Adobe when it housed the Pekin Curio Store c. 1909

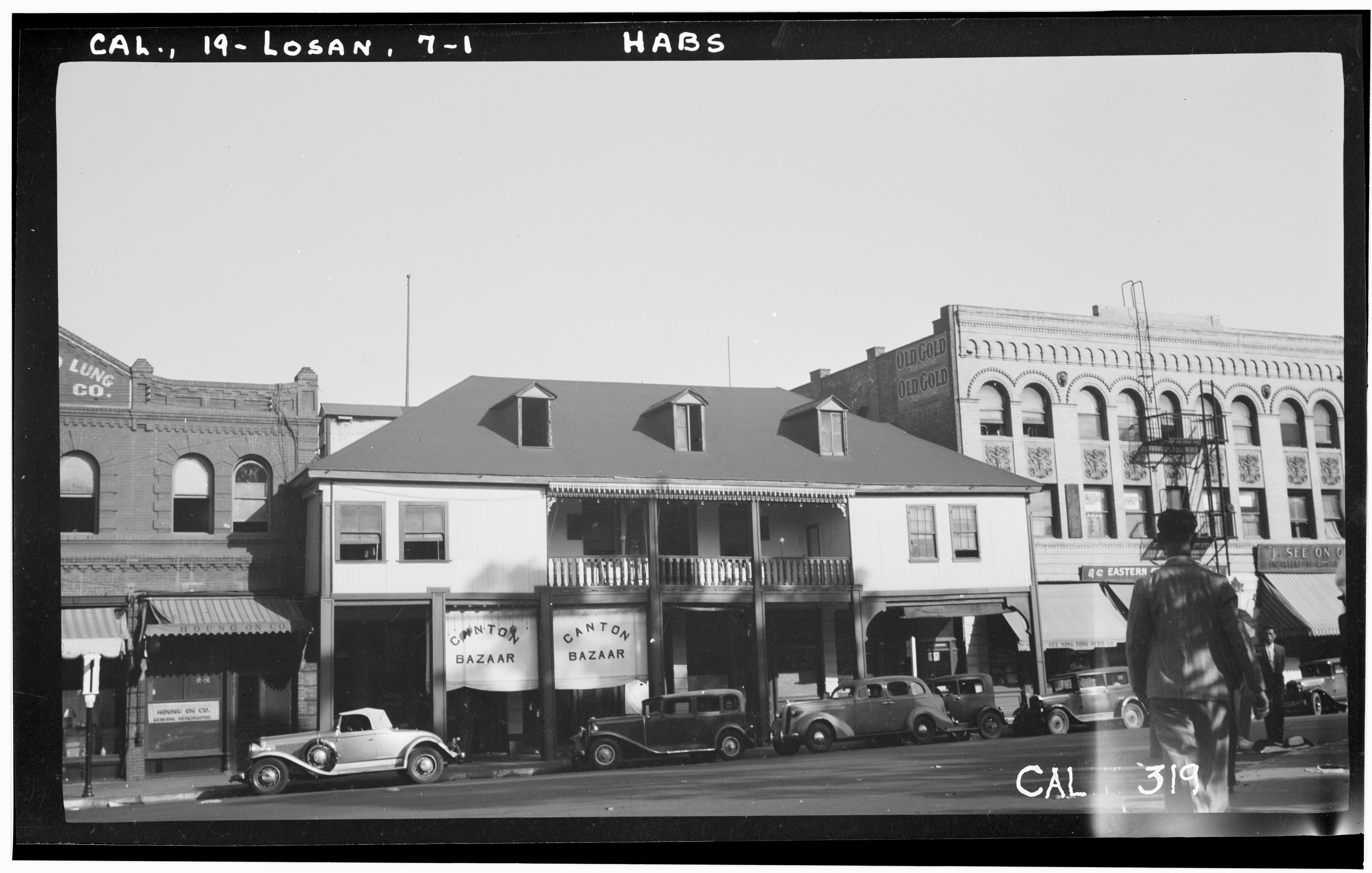
Lugo Adobe, 1936

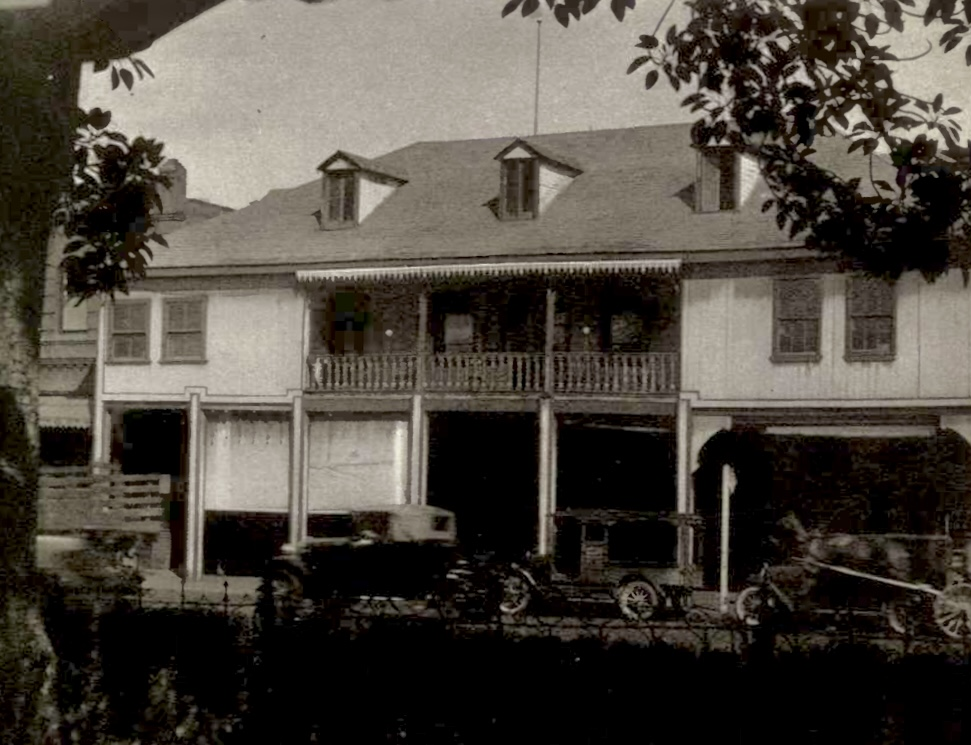
"Old Lugo House on the Plaza, Los Angeles" from the American Guide to Los Angeles, published 1941

== Vicente Lugo biography ==
Don Vicente Lugo was born on April 5, 1822. He was the son of Don Antonio Maria De Lugo and Maria Delores Dominga Ruiz Lugo. He married Maria Andrea del Carmen Ballesteros. He had two children: Belen Lugo and Blas Angel Lugo. He died on February 25, 1890. Don Antonio Maria De Lugo was the owner of large land grants in Southern California. His brother was José del Carmen Lugo.

José del Carmen Lugo, in a joint venture with his brothers José María and Don Vicente Lugo and cousin Diego Sepúlveda, began colonizing the San Bernardino Valley and adjacent Yucaipa Valley. The land covered more than 250,000 acres (1,012 km^{2}) in the present day Inland Empire. Their colony charter was approved by the Mexican government in 1839. The valley was plagued by robberies and frequent raids by California Indians resisting loss of their homeland. Many would-be colonizers would stay for only short periods of time. The Lugo families became strong allies with the Mountain Band of Cahuilla Indians led by Chief Juan Antonio.

Harris Newmark remarked of Don Vicente that "the Beau Brummel of Los Angeles" in the early 1850s was "Don Vicente Lugo, whose wardrobe was made up exclusively of the fanciest patterns of Mexican type; his home, one of the few two-story houses in the pueblo, was close to Ygnacio del Valle's. Lugo, a brother of Don José María, was one of the heavy taxpayers of his time; as late as 1860, he had herds of twenty-five hundred head of cattle, or half a thousand more than Pío and Andrés Pico together owned. María Ballestero, Lugo's mother-in-law, lived near him.".

== Marker ==
Marker on the site reads:

- "NO. 301 LUGO ADOBE (SITE OF) - The Lugo Adobe, said to have been built in the 1840s by Don Vicente Lugo, was one of the very few two-story houses in the pueblo of Los Angeles. In 1867, Lugo donated this house on the Plaza to St. Vincent's School (forerunner of Loyola University). From the 1880s until it was razed in 1951, the building was occupied by the Chinese."

== See also ==
- California Historical Landmarks in Los Angeles County
