= Felix Signoret =

American politician

Member of the Los Angeles Common Council
- In office May 9, 1863 – May 5, 1864
- Preceded by: Antonio F. Coronel
- Succeeded by: Jacob Weizel

Personal details
- Born: June 9, 1825 Marseille, France
- Died: July 28, 1878 (aged 53) Los Angeles, California, U.S.
- Resting place: Calvary Cemetery
- Spouse: Catherine Pagen
- Occupation: Hotelier, politician

Felix Signoret (1825–1878) was a member of the Common Council, the governing body of the city of Los Angeles, and also of the Los Angeles County Board of Supervisors in the 19th century. He was the leader of a vigilante gang that carried out a lynching of a reputed murderer in 1863.

== Early life ==
Signoret was born in France on June 9, 1825, living in Marseille before he came to the United States.

== Career ==
Signoret built a new hotel at Main and Turner streets, north of Arcadia Street and "opposite the Pico House," with a Mansard pitch in 1874.

Signoret was elected to the Los Angeles Common Council, the governing body of the city, serving from May 9, 1863, to May 5, 1864. He was also a member of the Los Angeles County Board of Supervisors in 1866.

== Lynching ==
Signoret was the leader of the lynching take took place in Los Angeles, in 1863—that of "a Frenchman named Lachenais"—who was suspected of killing a neighbor, Jacob Bell. Contemporary writer Harris Newmark recounted that:

A meeting at Stearn's Hall was largely attended; a Vigilance Committee was formed; Lachenais's record was reviewed and his death at the hands of an outraged committee was decided upon. Everything being arranged, three hundred or more armed men, under the leadership of Felix Signoret, ... assembled on the morning of December 17th, marched to the jail, overcame Sheriff Burns and his assistants, took Lachenais out, dragged him to the ... corner of Temple and New High streets ... and summarily hanged him.... The following January, County Judge Y. Sepulveda charged the Grand Jury to do its duty toward ferreting out the leaders of the mob, and so wipe out this reproach to the city; but the Grand Jury expressed the conviction that if the law had hitherto been faithfully executed in Los Angeles, such scenes in broad daylight would never have taken place.

An article by Steve Harvey in the San Diego edition of the Los Angeles Times on September 5, 1984, stated that Signoret "led a lynch mob that hanged five people in Los Angeles in 1869–70 in the aftermath of a murder resulting from 'offensive remarks (made) about the newly organized French Benevolent Society.'"

== Personal life and death ==
Signoret was married to Catherine Pagen, also of France. Their children were P. Josephine, Rose, Anna and Caroline, and possibly Louise and Felix P. By trade he was a barber, later an apartment owner. The Signorets bought a parcel of land at 125 Aliso Street in 1871 and built a "substantial brick house" about thirty feet wide with an area of nearly 1,800 square feet; the roof was "hipped on all four sides in mimicry of the fashionable Mansard shape. . . . By 1888 the Signorets . . . were long gone, and their genteel house was used as a brothel."

Signoret died on July 28, 1878, and was buried in Calvary Cemetery, East Los Angeles.
