= Montgomery House (Los Angeles, California) =

Montgomery House was a popular hotel and saloon in 1850s Los Angeles, California.

Montgomery House was owned by William C. Getman (elected County Sheriff in 1858). It also served as a center of civil affairs and public meetings. Montgomery House served as the headquarters of the militia companies organized to protect Los Angeles from the Flores Daniel Gang after the killing of Sheriff Barton and his posse. On December 12, 1857, a meeting was held at the hotel to draw up and sign a petition asking that military forces be sent to defend the southern counties from Mormon raiders during the Utah War, following the Mountain Meadows Massacre and the mass evacuation of San Bernardino Mormons to Utah.
