= Pico House =

- U.S. Historic district – Contributing property
- California Historical Landmark
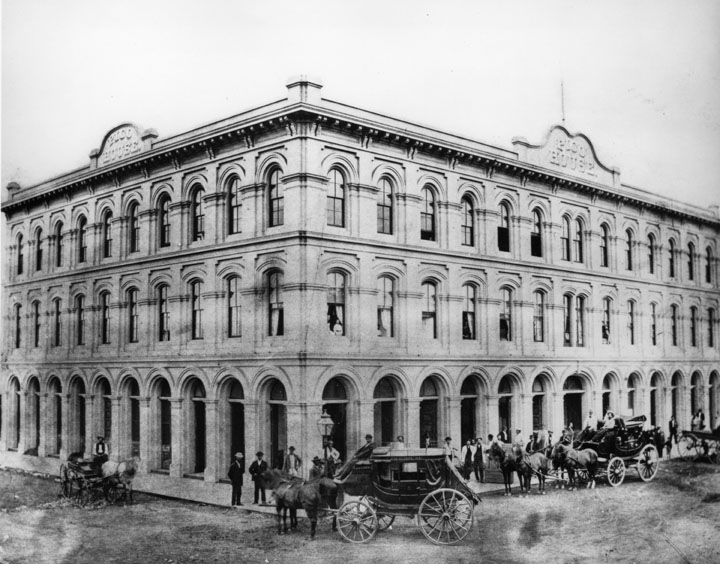
- The Pico House hotel in 1875.

- Location within the Los Angeles metropolitan area Location within California Location within the United States
- Location: Los Angeles, California
- Coordinates: 34°03′21.75″N 118°14′22″W
- Built: 1869–1870
- Architect: Ezra F. Kysor
- Architectural style: Victorian
- Part of: Los Angeles Plaza Historic District (ID72000231)
- CHISL No.: 159
- Designated CP: November 3, 1972

The Pico House is a historic building in Los Angeles, California, dating from its days as a small town in Southern California. Located on 430 North Main Street, it sits across the old Los Angeles Plaza from Olvera Street and El Pueblo de Los Ángeles Historical Monument.

== History ==
Pío Pico, a successful businessman who was the last Mexican Governor of Alta California, ordered construction of a luxury hotel in the growing town. The architect was Ezra F. Kysor, who also designed the Cathedral of Saint Vibiana, and it was constructed between 1869 and 1870, opening to serve the small town of 5,700 people.

The Italianate three storey, 33-room hotel, dubbed Pico House (or Casa de Pico), was the most extravagant and lavish hotel in Southern California, and its opening was cause for much celebration. It had a total of nearly 80 rooms, large windows, a small interior court, and a grand staircase. In the days of the hotel's primacy the courtyard featured a fountain and an aviary of exotic birds. The structure forms three sides of a trapezoid whose open end immediately abuts the adjacent Merced Theatre, thus forming the courtyard. The back of the hotel faces Sanchez Street, where the large gate used by supply wagons and other large vehicles can still be seen.

Its time in the spotlight did not last very long. By 1876, the Southern Pacific Railroad had linked the city with the rest of the country and more residents and businessmen began pouring in. Pio Pico himself started having financial troubles, and lost the hotel to the San Francisco Savings and Loan Company.

In 1882, the hotel was so crowded with guests that Manager Dunham secured 30 rooms on the opposite side of the street, "and still the cry is more room." The business center of the city began to move south and, by 1900, the condition of the building began to decline and it was operated as a lodging house until it was acquired by the El Pueblo de Los Ángeles Historical Monument. Parts of this building were renovated in 1981 and 1992. The ground floor is occasionally used for exhibits and other events.

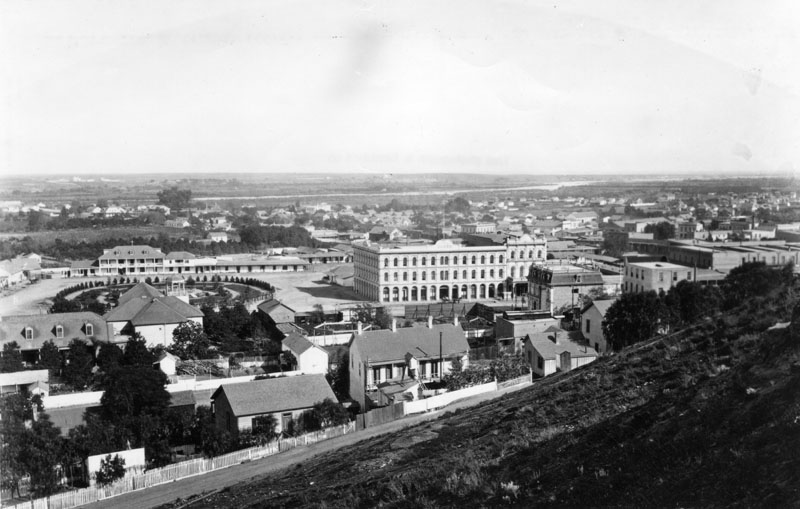
The Pico House dominates the Plaza in old downtown Los Angeles, 1876 (photo taken from old Fort Moore)

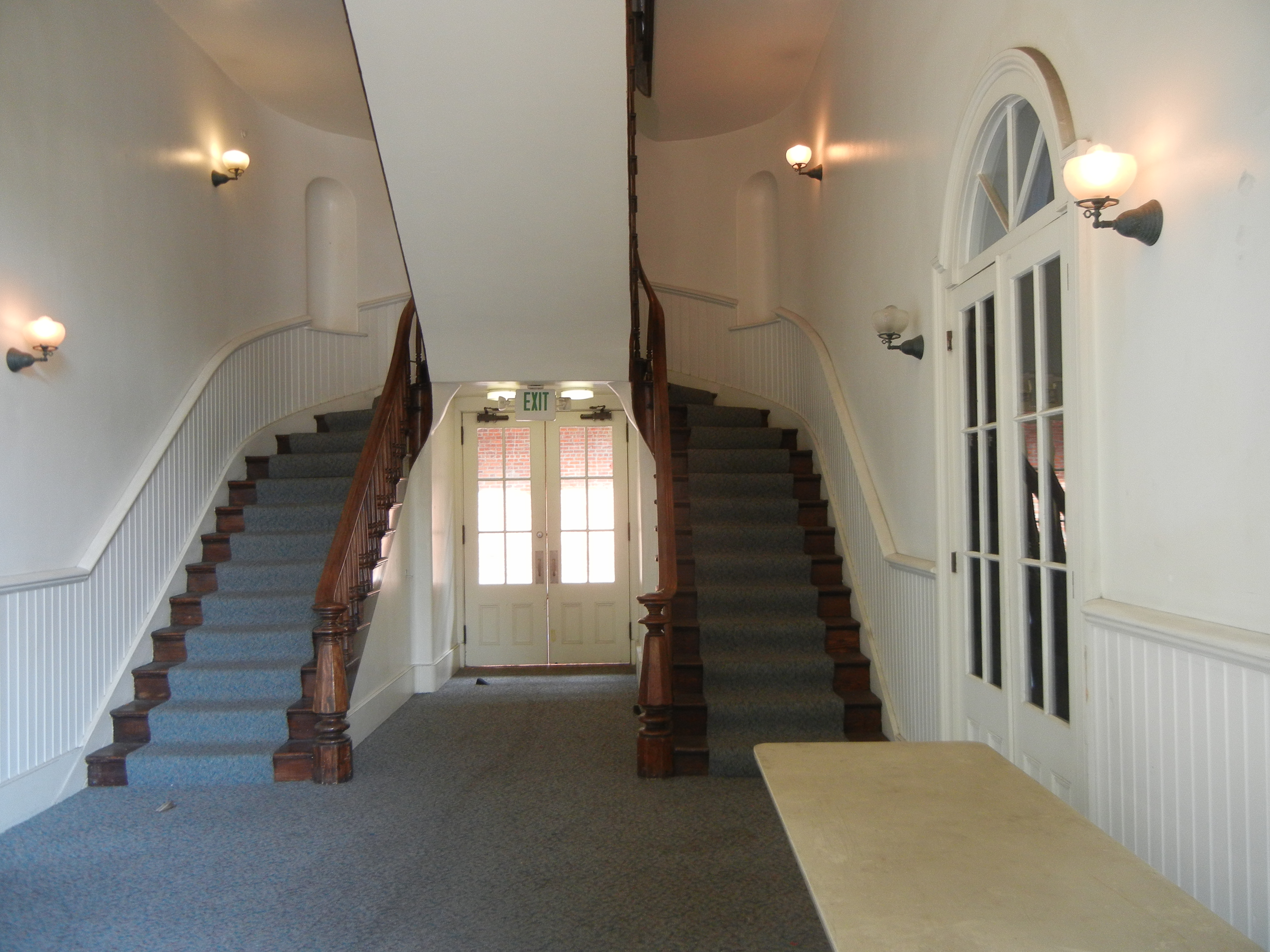
Part of the renovated interior

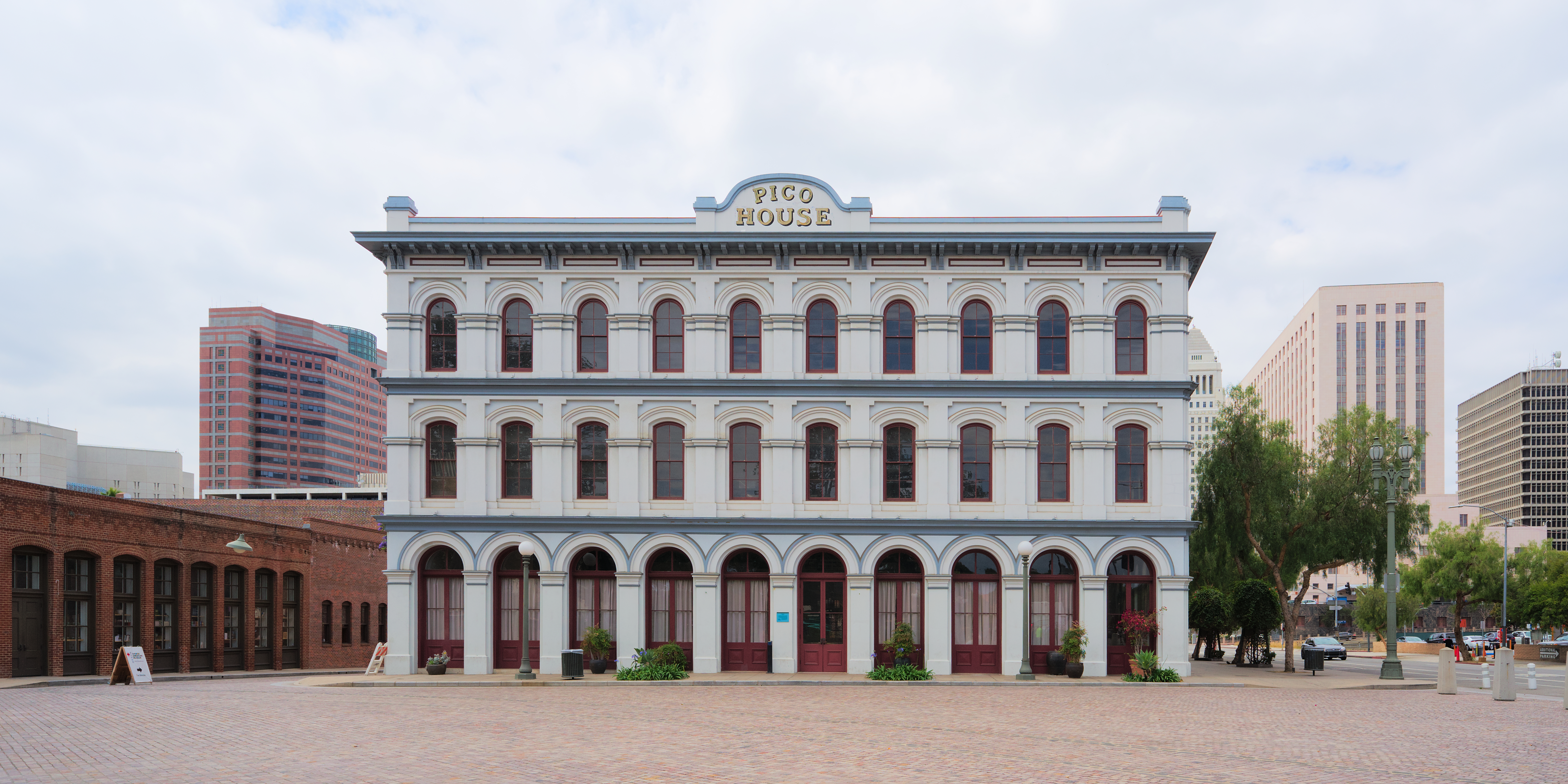
Modern appearance

== Landmark ==
The Pico House is listed as a California Historical Landmark (No. 159) and a National Historic Landmark as a part of the Los Angeles Plaza Historic District (NPS-72000231).

== In popular culture ==
- The rear of Pico House was used in the TV show The Mentalist. It represents the headquarters of the fictional California Bureau of Investigation and is frequently seen during the show.
