= Old Chinatown, Los Angeles =

Original location of settlement

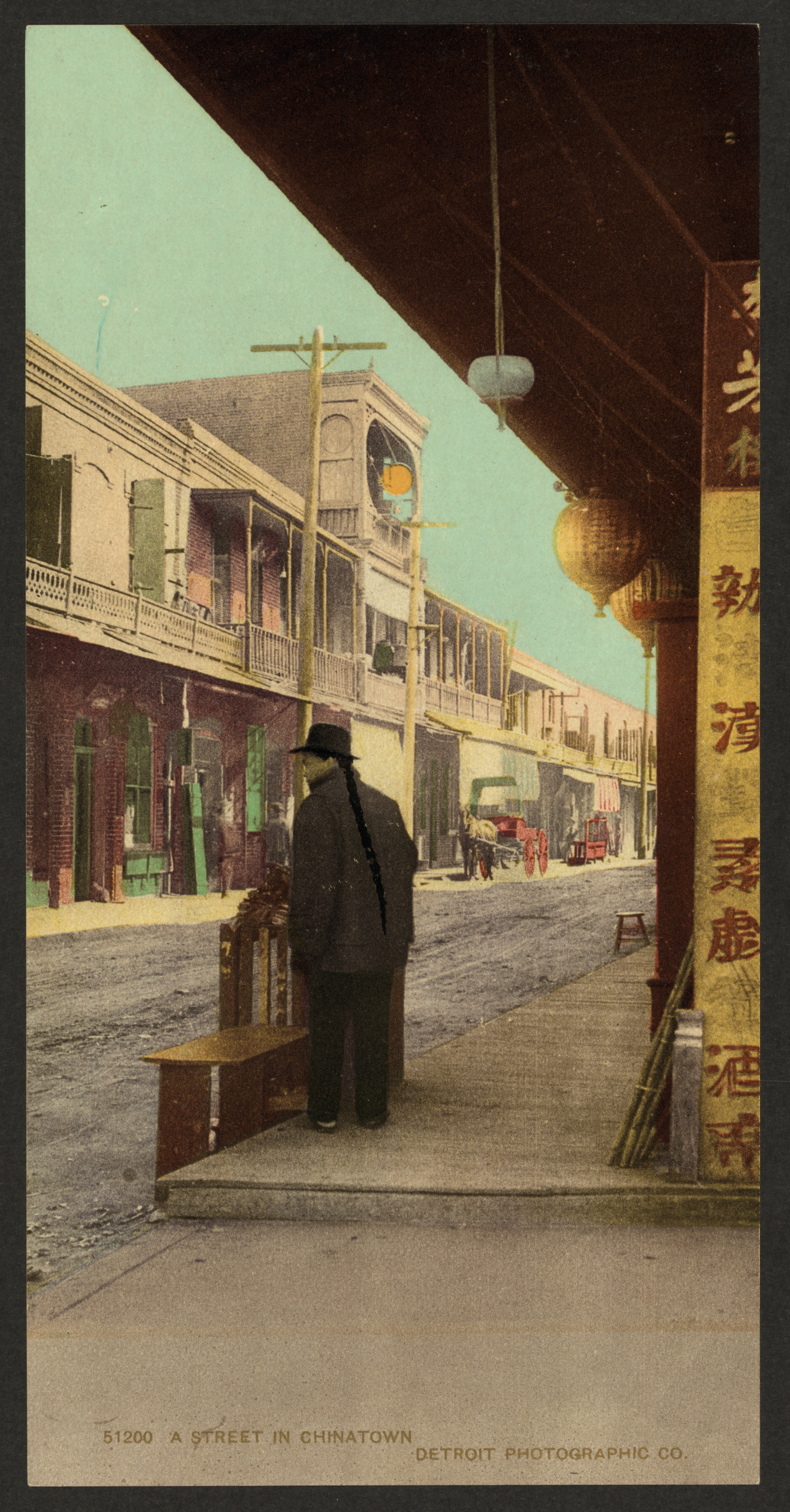
Photo postcard dated between 1898 and 1905: "A street in Chinatown"

Old Chinatown, or original Chinatown, is a former Chinese-American ethnic enclave enforced by legal segregation that existed near downtown Los Angeles, California in the United States from the 1860s until the 1930s. A retronym, Old Chinatown included the former Calle de los Negros and extended east across Alameda Street to Apablasa, Benjamin, Jeannete, Juan, Marchessault, and Macy Streets. This Chinatown was at its commercial and communal peak between 1890 and 1910.

== History ==
In the early 1860s, thousands of Chinese men, most of them originating from Guangdong province in southern China, were hired by Central Pacific Railroad Co. to work on the western portion of the first transcontinental railroad. Many of them settled in Los Angeles.

In the Chinese massacre of 1871, 19 Chinese men and boys were killed by a mob of about 500 men in an area of Los Angeles known as Calle de los Negros or Negro Alley, which had been known as a dangerous area for two decades. It was one of the most serious incidents of racial violence that has ever occurred in the American West.

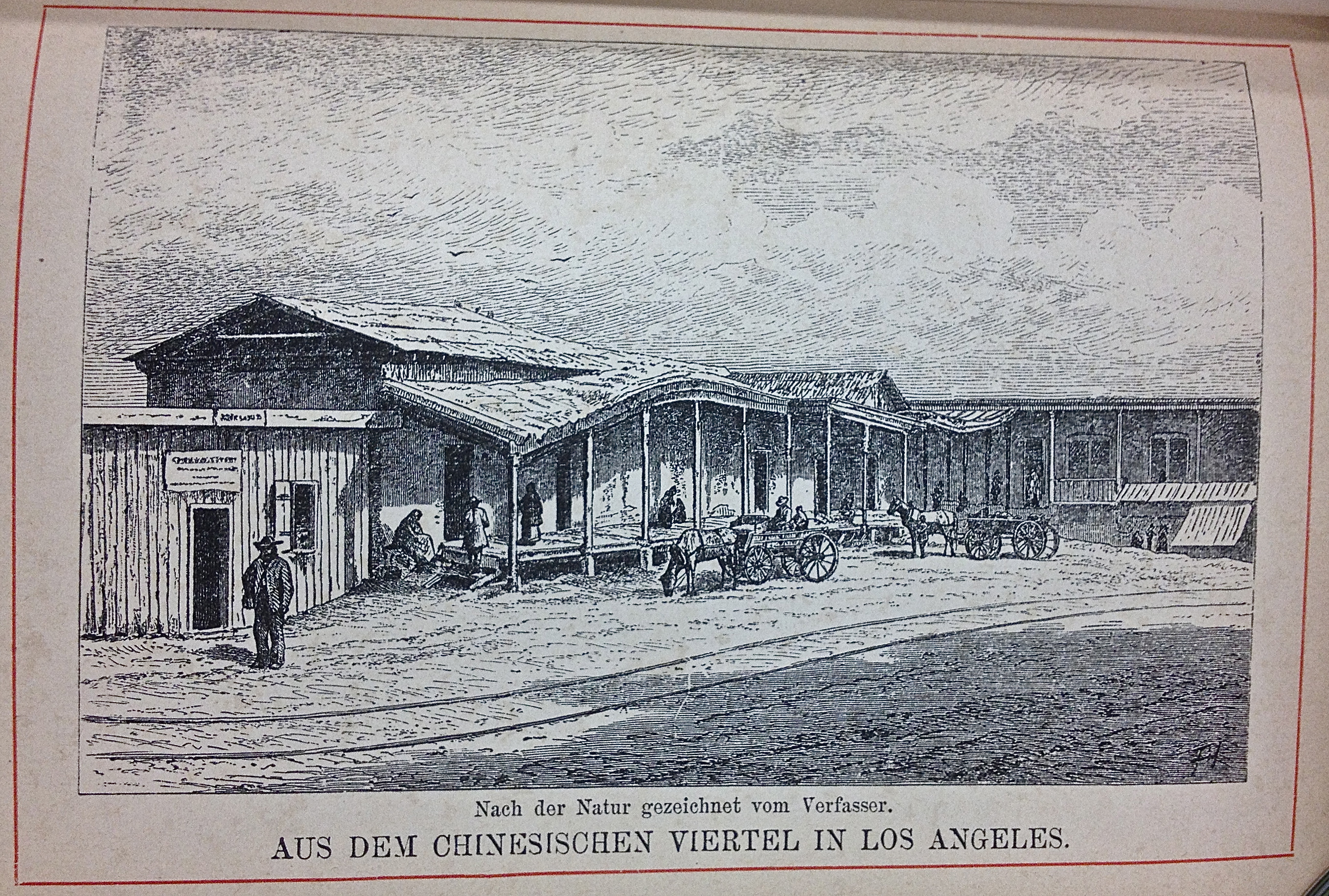
Chinese Quarter, ca. 1885, by Archduke Ludwig Salvator of Austria

The first Chinatown, centered on Alameda and Macy Streets (now Cesar Chavez Avenue), was established in 1880. Reaching its heyday from 1890 to 1910, Chinatown grew to approximately fifteen streets and alleys containing some two hundred buildings. It boasted a Chinese Opera theater, three temples, a newspaper and a telephone exchange. But laws prohibiting most Chinese from citizenship and property ownership, as well as legislation curtailing immigration, inhibited future growth.

According to LAPL history-department librarian Glen Creason, “The strange cartographical phenomena of Chinatown is that it was often ignored…However, we do have several intimate looks in the Dakin Atlas or our Sanborn Fire Insurance atlases that name the dens of sin and label opium joints, saloons, tenements, gambling establishments, and buildings labeled ‘I.F.’ for houses of ill fame…Chinatown was a place of many stories where families lived good lives alongside shady operations where rubes were fleeced and Angelenos wiped their brows with the devil’s kerchief.”

Circa 1900, there were about 3,000 people living in Chinatown.

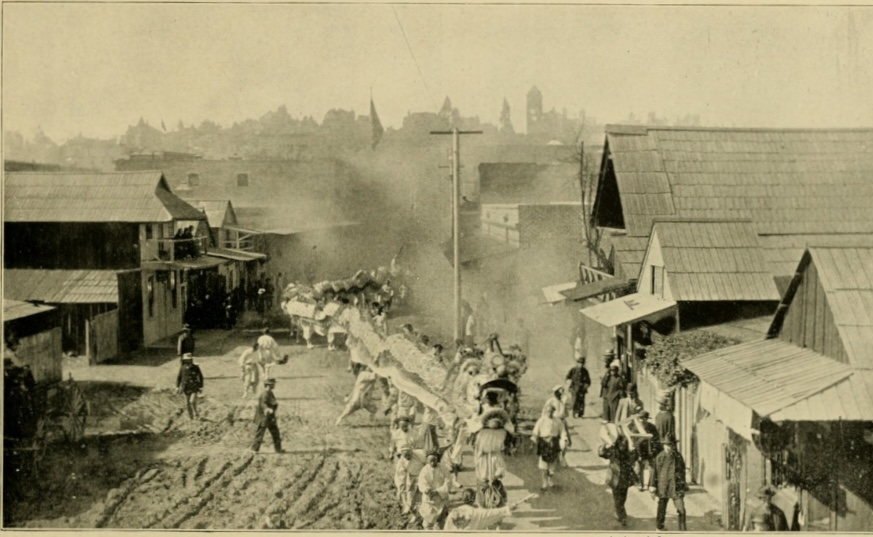
”The Chinese dragon in the Chinese quarter of Los Angeles,” photo published 1900

This Chinatown was described in a 1914 southern California guidebook created for visitors to the Panama-Pacific Exposition:

North of the old plaza, at North Los Angeles and Marchesault streets, is Chinatown, a fantastic bit of the Orient which furnishes the tourist with many interesting sights, both during the day and the evening. For the stranger, a guide is desirable, especially during the evening. Unless one is going merely for shopping, a guide will add much to the pleasure of the visit, since he will have access to place not open to everyone, and will explain the curious customs of the Chinese. The shops are filled with beautiful and attractive articles and the quaint dresses of the women and children are a neverending source of interest. For any festal occasion the costumes of the men and women are beautiful in quality and color and the effect is highly decorative.

From the early 1910s, Chinatown began to decline. Symptoms of a corrupt Los Angeles discolored the public's view of Chinatown; gambling houses, opium dens and a fierce tong warfare severely reduced business in the area. As tenants and lessees rather than outright owners, the residents of Old Chinatown were threatened with impending redevelopment, and as a result the owners neglected upkeep of their buildings. Eventually, the entire area was sold and then resold, as entrepreneurs and developers fought over the area.

In the interregnum, a spur of Old Chinatown grew up around the City Market at Ninth and San Pedro, sometimes called the City Market Chinatown. The market provided jobs and new opportunities so “residents moved to single family homes in the East Adams area to be closer to the new market.”

After thirty years of decay, a Supreme Court ruling approved condemnation of the area to allow for construction of a major rail terminal, Union Station. Residents were evicted to make room for Union Station without a plan for the relocation of the Chinatown community.

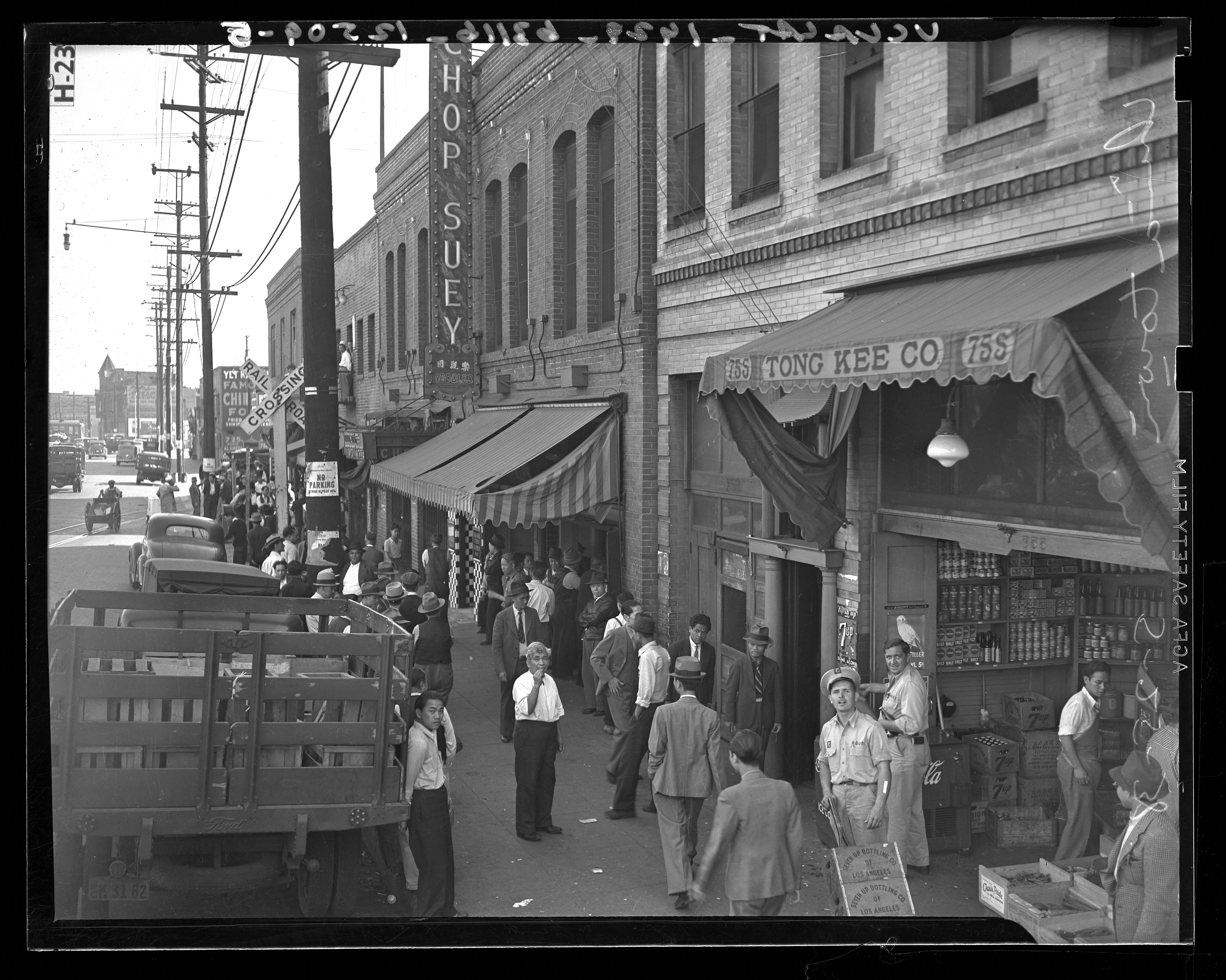
Crowd gathers in Old Chinatown after a police raid on gambling dens, 1938.

Chinatown was gradually demolished, leaving many businesses without a place to do business and forcing some to close. A remnant of Old Chinatown persisted into the early 1950s, situated between Union Station and the Old Plaza. Several businesses and a Buddhist temple lined Ferguson Alley, a narrow one-block street running between the Plaza and Alameda. The most notable of the surviving buildings was the old Lugo Adobe, having been built in 1838 by the prominent Californio family. Some decades later, the Lugo Adobe became the original home of Loyola Marymount University, and later, it was rented to Chinese-Americans who ran shops on the ground floor and a lodging house upstairs. Christine Sterling, who had brought to fruition the Olvera Street and China City projects, argued that remaining buildings of Old Chinatown were an eyesore and advocated successfully for the razing of all the remaining structures between the Plaza and Union Station.

"The original Chinatown's only remaining edifice is the two-story Garnier Building, once a residence and meeting place for immigrant Chinese," according to Angels Walk – Union Station/El Pueblo/Little Tokyo/Civic Center guide book. The Chinese American Museum is now situated in the Garnier Building.

Seven years passed before an acceptable relocation proposal was put into place, situating a new Chinatown in its present location.

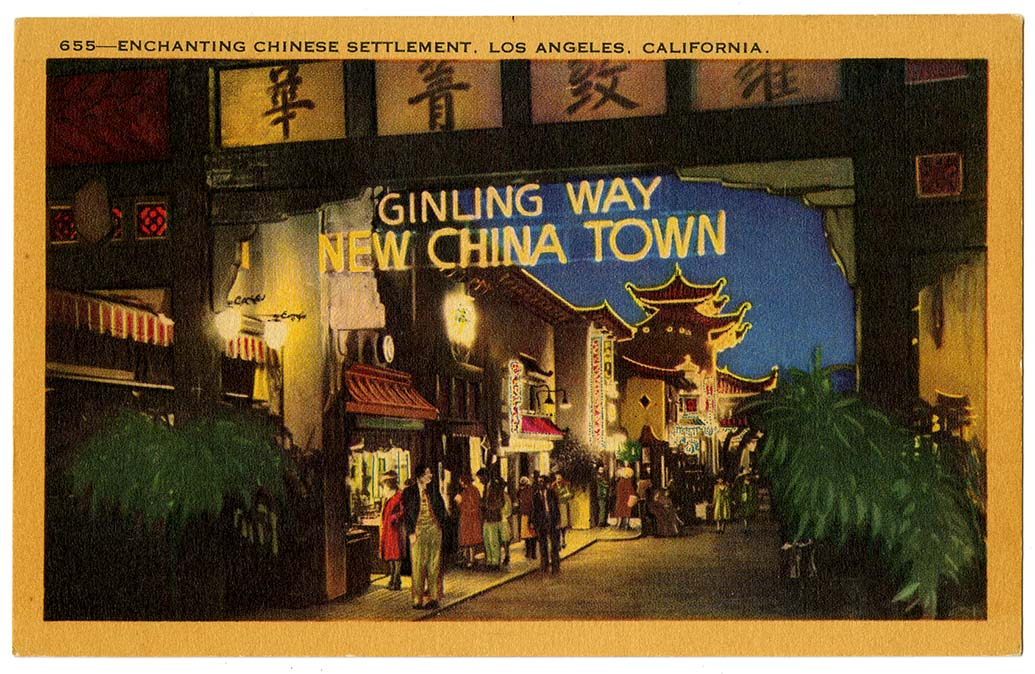
Longshaw Co. postcard celebrating the "enchanting Chinese settlement" of New Chinatown

In the late 1950s the covenants on the use and ownership of property were removed, allowing Chinese Americans to live in other neighborhoods and gain access to new types of employment.

== Cultural impact ==
The 1974 film Chinatown, set in 1937, creates an almost completely apocryphal alternate history of Los Angeles. Nonetheless, the Chinatown of the title and the oft-quoted line “Forget it, Jake, it’s Chinatown,” almost certainly refers to Old Chinatown, or at least the popular perception thereof. (The grand opening of “New Chinatown” was in 1938.)

A construction project near Union Station in 1987 excavated many relics of Old Chinatown. Most are the possession of the Chinese Historical Society of Southern California but some old bottles and similar items were incorporated into a fountain in the underground subway lobby of Union Station.

In 2021, the author Lisa See, whose family has roots in Los Angeles’ Chinese-American community dating to the 19th century, donated a collection of glass-plate negatives of photos of Old Chinatown to the Huntington Library in San Marino, California. The collection has been in her family since the 1940s; the exact source is unknown, someone likely abandoned it or dropped it off at her family’s Chinatown antique store. The collection is a combination of photos of daily life and posed portraits of residents.

== See also ==
- History of Chinese Americans in Los Angeles
- Sonoratown, Los Angeles
- Victorian Downtown Los Angeles
- Chinese enclaves in the San Gabriel Valley
- Chinese Historical Society of Southern California
- List of Chinatowns
- List of districts and neighborhoods of Los Angeles
