= China City =

China City may refer to:

- China City, Los Angeles, short-lived 1930s entertainment district
- China City of America, real-estate development in New York
- List of cities in China
- China National Youth Games, formerly the China City Games
