= History of Chinese Americans in Los Angeles =

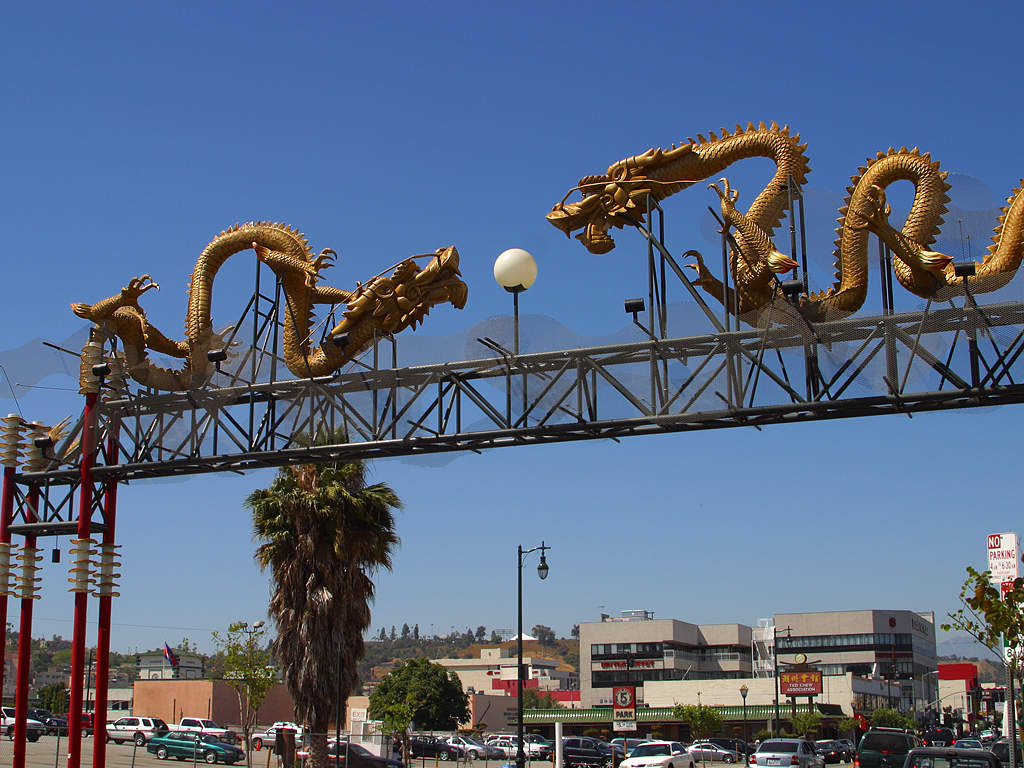
Chinatown, Los Angeles

Historically there has been a population of Chinese Americans in Los Angeles and the Los Angeles Metropolitan Area. As of 2010, there were 393,488 Chinese Americans in Los Angeles County, 4.0% of the county's population, and 66,782 Chinese Americans in the city of Los Angeles (1.8% of the total population).

== History ==
The historian William Mason stated that the first Chinese in Los Angeles were Ah Luce and Ah Fou, who arrived in 1850. In his memoirs, Harris Newmark stated that the first Chinese person was the servant of his uncle, Joseph Newmark.

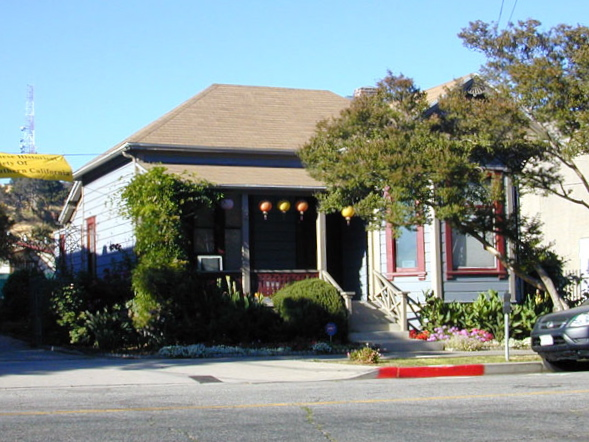
Chinatown Heritage and Visitors Center, Chinese Historical Society of Southern California

The Chinese massacre of 1871 was a racially motivated riot which occurred on October 24, 1871 in Los Angeles, when a mob of around 500 white men entered Chinatown to attack, rob, and murder Chinese residents of the city. An estimated 17 to 20 Chinese immigrants were systematically tortured and then hanged by the mob, making the event the largest mass lynching in American history.

By 1900, there were about 3,000 Chinese in the city. Most residents of the old Chinatown came from Sanyi (San Yup) and Siyi (Sze Yup) in Guangdong. The Old Chinatown began to decline as more Chinese left. The Los Angeles Union Passenger Terminal, built in 1933, was built over much of the former Old Chinatown, so a new Chinatown was established after Peter SooHoo Sr. and Herbert Lapham, an agent for the Santa Fe Railway, negotiated a land purchase for what would become the new Chinatown.

Christine Sterling, a civic leader, developed "China City," a tourist attraction which opened in 1938. Chinese working there also lived there. After two fires, "China City" decayed and was gone by the 1950s. To make way for the Hollywood Freeway, almost all of the remainder of old Chinatown was destroyed in 1951. The remaining portions were parts of Sanchez Alley and Garnier Block.

More Chinese, especially those from Hong Kong, immigrated to Los Angeles after the Immigration and Nationality Act of 1965 (Hart-Cellar Act) passed. By the end of the 20th Century many Chinese began moving to suburbs such as Monterey Park, Alhambra, Arcadia, and Rosemead. By 2013, large numbers of ethnic Chinese moved into communities in the San Gabriel Valley, including San Gabriel, San Marino, and Walnut.

The 2015 Rowland Heights, California bullying incident involved Chinese nationals living in the Los Angeles area.

== Geography ==
The San Gabriel Valley has a large Chinese population. Much of the Chinese immigrants are from Taiwan and Hong Kong. The population is concentrated in the cities of Monterey Park and Alhambra.

== Institutions ==
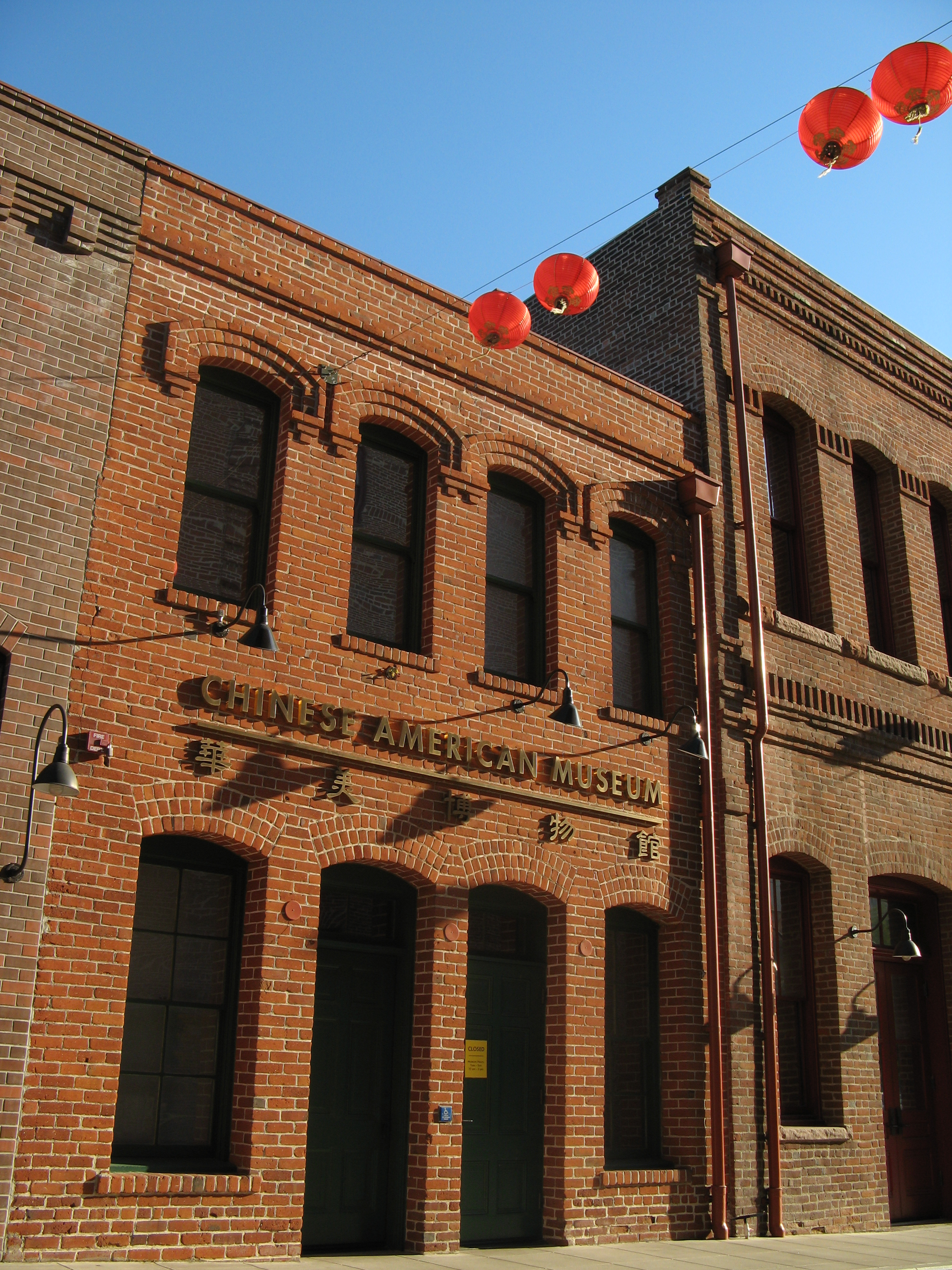
Chinese American Museum

The Chinese American Museum is located in Downtown Los Angeles. The Chinese Historical Society of Southern California is located in Los Angeles, California.

== Language ==
Previously Cantonese was a major spoken language among the Los Angeles area Chinese. By 2022 Mandarin Chinese was becoming more dominant.

== Education ==
As of 2006 most of the Greater Los Angeles Chinese supplementary educational schools are located in Chinese communities, serving mostly ethnic Chinese, in the San Gabriel Valley. The ethnic Chinese students come from various ethnic Chinese backgrounds. The weekend schools have a tendency of attracting clientele from wider areas while daily programs have a tendency of attracting nearby students.

As of 1993 Saturday morning Chinese language programs in the San Gabriel Valley had about 10,000 Chinese American children as students. That year Chinese schools held classes in four Rowland Unified School District elementary school campuses. As of 2006, the Southern California Chinese Consumer Yellow Pages had a listing of such institutes, stating that there were 135 academic after school tutoring establishments, with buxibans among them. The same directory listed 90 Chinese language schools, 90 dancing and music schools, and 50 art centers and schools.

The weekend Chinese schools, in addition to Saturday classes, also held classes on summer weekdays and in after-school periods on other weekdays. As of 1993 the yearly tuition of a weekend Chinese school for children ranged $200 to $300 (with inflation accounted for, $445.75 to $668.62) per person. Classes were generally held from 8:30 AM to 12:30 PM. Some public schools in the San Gabriel Valley distributed foreign language credits to students of Chinese schools.

=== Chinese schools ===
11 Los Angeles area Chinese weekend schools in Los Angeles County co-founded the Southern California Council of Chinese Schools in 1976. In 1993 this council operated Chinese schools in California and Arizona, and that year almost all of the San Gabriel Valley Chinese schools belonged to this council.

The Hacienda Heights Area Chinese School, which opened in 1982, initially held classes in a church and had about 100 students. In 1984 it moved to Dibble Adult School. In 1990 it began holding classes at Cedarlane Junior High School due to an expanding student body. As of 1993 it had about 550 students.

Michael Chen co-founded the Ming Yuan Institute, held at St. Steven's Catholic School in Monterey Park, in 1987. As of 1993 the school had 750 students in its main Saturday program in Monterey Park and 50 students at a branch campus in Rowland Heights.

The San Fernando Valley Chinese School was founded in 1971 and had sponsorship from the San Fernando Valley Chinese Cultural Association. As of 1988 it holds its classes in Andasol Elementary School in Northridge.

== Notable people ==
- Lanhee Chen
- Judy Chu
- Helen Liu Fong
- Michelle Kwan
- Ted Lieu
