= Los Angeles Chinese massacre of 1871 =

Riotous lynching

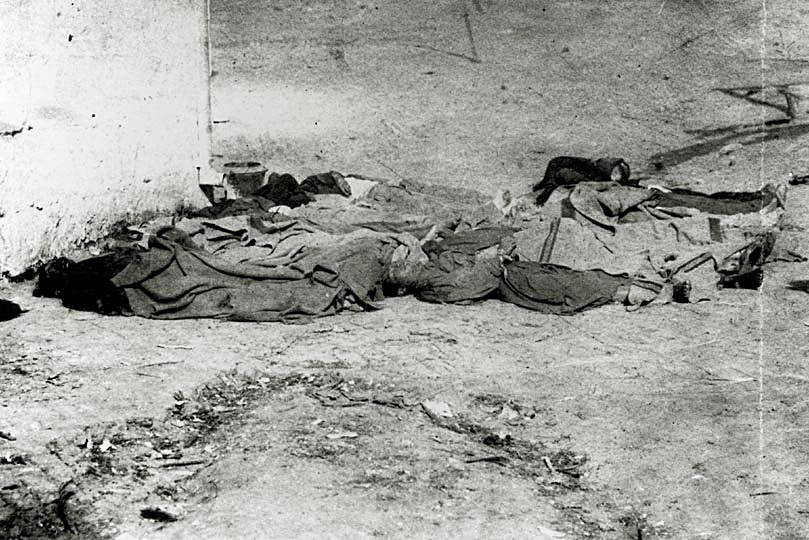
- Chinese immigrants who were murdered during the massacre

- Los Angeles Chinese massacre of 1871 (Los Angeles)
- Location: 34.056583°N 118.237806°W; Los Angeles, California, US
- Date: October 24, 1871
- Target: Chinese immigrants
- Attack type: Massacre, Pogrom, Ethnic cleansing
- Deaths: 19
- Perpetrator: Mob of around 500 non-Chinese men
- Motive: Racially motivated, revenge for the accidental killing of Robert Thompson, a local rancher

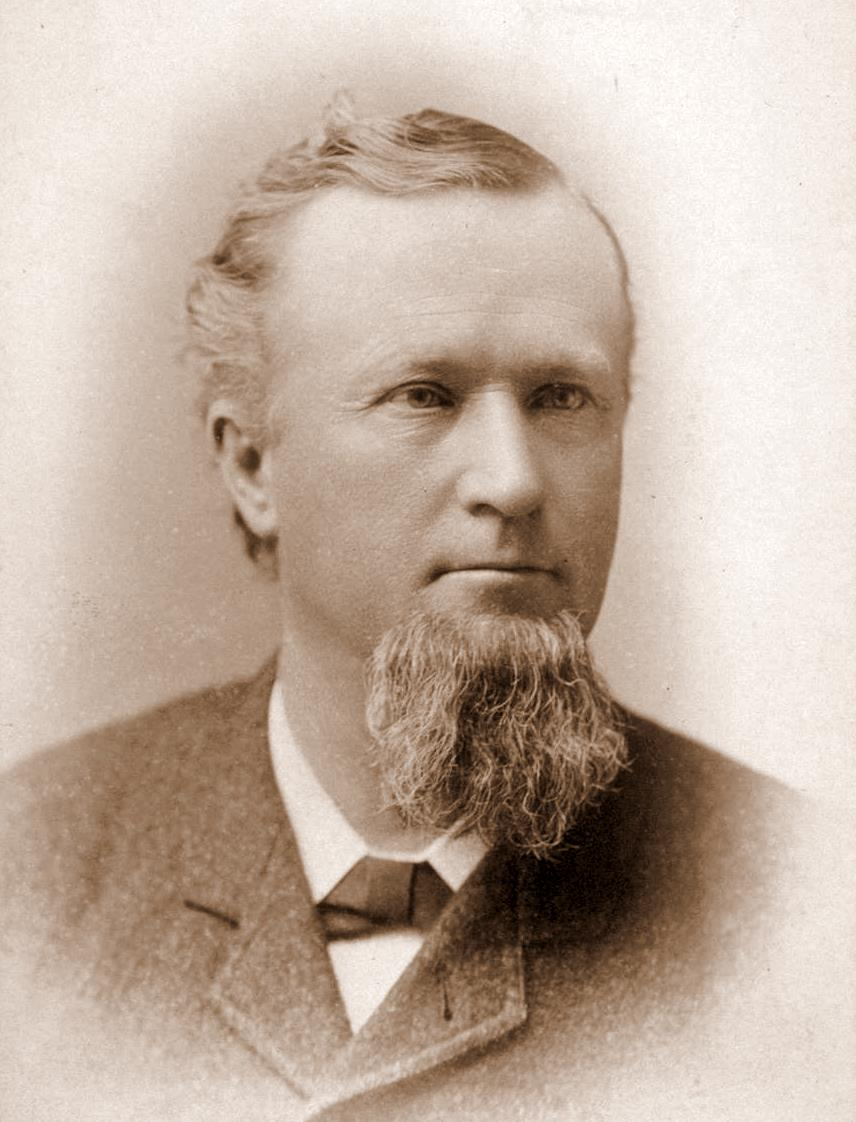
Robert Maclay Widney, c. 1885

The Los Angeles Chinese massacre of 1871 was a racial massacre targeting Chinese immigrants in Los Angeles, California, United States that occurred on October 24, 1871. Approximately 500 white and Latino Americans attacked, harassed, robbed, and murdered the ethnic Chinese residents in what is today referred to as the old Chinatown neighborhood. The massacre took place on Calle de los Negros, also referred to as "Negro Alley". The mob gathered after hearing that a policeman and a rancher had been killed as a result of a conflict between rival tongs, the Nin Yung, and Hong Chow. As news of their death spread across the city, fueling rumors that the Chinese community "were killing whites wholesale", more men gathered around the boundaries of Negro Alley.

A few 21st-century sources have described what followed as the largest mass lynching in American history. Nineteen Chinese immigrants were killed, fifteen of whom were hanged by the mob in the course of the riot. At least one, Dr. Chee Long "Gene" Tong was mutilated when a member of the mob cut off a finger to obtain the victim's diamond ring. Those killed represented over 10% of the small Chinese population of Los Angeles at the time, which numbered 172 prior to the massacre. Ten men of the mob were prosecuted and eight were convicted of manslaughter in these deaths. The convictions were overturned on appeal due to technicalities.

== Summary ==
The Los Angeles Chinese massacre of 1871 was an act of mob brutality that resulted in the murder of eighteen Chinese residents. The massacre's immediate cause emanates from a conflict between rival Huiguan, the Nin Yung, and Hong Chow.

The day before the massacre, Won Choy attempted to kill Yo Hing for the abduction of his sister, Yut Ho. The following day, another skirmish occurred, and this time, Won Choy received a fatal gunshot wound to the neck. Officer Jesus Bilderain responded to the scene and was shot inside the Coronel building while attempting to arrest one of the gunmen. Several civilians assisted the police, including a farmer named Robert Thompson who was shot in the chest. Soon after, the Sheriff arrived and deputized a group of men with instructions to guard the Coronel building and prevent any occupants from escaping. Thompson was taken to an apothecary on Main Street where he died two hours later. Following the news of Thompson's death, residents of Los Angeles started to congregate around the Coronel Adobe. Members of the crowd shot at the doors and windows of the building. At nine o'clock p.m., a door was battered down, and the occupants were dragged outside and towards makeshift gallows. According to reports, some in the crowd tried to calm the group and preclude the slayings, including Robert M. Widney, who would go on to become the district judge presiding over the subsequent trials. The massacre ended around 9:30 pm, when the Sheriff "called for twenty-five armed volunteers on the side of law and order to preserve the peace and guard the building until this morning."

The Coroner's inquest resulted in forty-nine indictments, containing the names of one hundred and fifty individuals. Seven men were convicted of manslaughter and received sentences ranging from two to six years in prison. However, an appeal to the California Supreme Court reversed the convictions and remitted the cases back to Widney's court. District Attorney Cameron E. Thom decided against retrying the cases and freed the accused in the spring of 1873.

== Background ==
In 1854, the California Supreme Court established that Chinese Americans and Chinese immigrants had no rights to testify against white citizens, making them vulnerable to abuse and injustice. In 1868 the United States had signed the Burlingame Treaty with the Chinese Empire, setting conditions for immigration. In this period, most Chinese workers who immigrated to the United States were men, intending to stay only temporarily. The small Chinese community in Los Angeles numbered roughly 178 individuals which was around 3 percent of the city's population with 80% being men. Most of these immigrants worked in occupation that others were unwilling to do, such as domestic services, gardening, and laundry work.

Another factor was the rough frontier nature of Los Angeles, which in the 1850s had a disproportionately high number of lynchings for its size, and an attachment to "popular justice" (this was also a period of violence across the country). It attracted transients from across the country, and alcohol use was high among the predominately male population.

In Los Angeles in the few days preceding the riot, two Chinese Tong factions, known as the Hong Chow and Nin Yung companies, had started a confrontation from a feud over the alleged abduction of a Chinese woman named Yut Ho (also documented as Ya Hit), who was announced in the paper as having married. Due to a lack of women in the Chinese community, most women in the community served as prostitutes and had essentially been sold into sexual slavery. Previously the police department had assisted the Tongs in keeping their confrontations over the women internal to the community, and sometimes capturing and returning women who had escaped, in exchange for payment by the Tongs, but in this case, things got out of hand. Two Chinese men were arrested for shooting at each other, and were released on bail, but the police kept watch on the Old Chinatown neighborhood. It had developed along Calle de los Negros, which was named in the colonial period.

=== Calle de los Negros ===
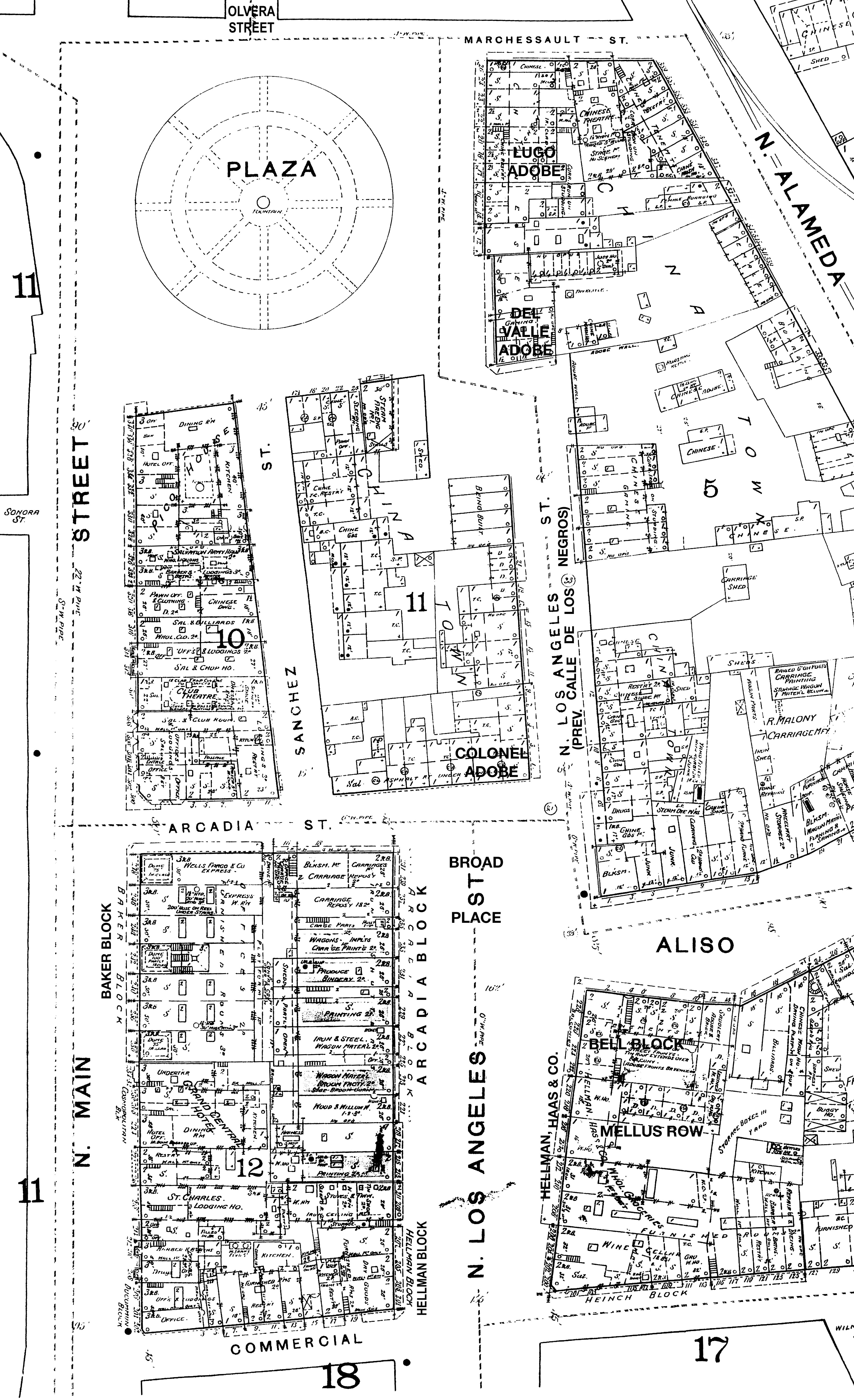
1888 map. Calle de los Negros had just been renamed Los Angeles Street. On either side, the buildings are marked "Chinatown". Coronel Adobe at the corner of Arcadia St., on Broad Place. Old Chinatown continued northeast across Alameda St., to what is now the Union Station complex.

Calle de los Negros was situated immediately northeast of Los Angeles's principal business district, running 500 feet (150 m) from the intersection of Arcadia Street to the plaza. The unpaved street was named by Spanish colonists for Californios (pre-annexation, Spanish-speaking Californians) of darker complexion (most likely of multiracial ancestry: Spanish, Native American, and African) who had originally lived there. The neighborhood had deteriorated into a slum by the time the first Chinatown of Los Angeles developed there in the 1860s.

Early 20th-century Los Angeles merchant Harris Newmark recalled in his memoir that Calle de los Negros was "as tough a neighborhood, in fact, as could be found anywhere." Los Angeles historian Morrow Mayo described it in 1933 as:

a dreadful thoroughfare, forty feet wide, running one whole block, filled entirely with saloons, gambling-houses, dance-halls, and cribs. It was crowded night and day with people of many races, male and female, all rushing and crowding along from one joint to another, from bar to bar, from table to table. There was a band in every joint, with harps, guitars, and other stringed instruments predominating.

=== Sing Yu's abduction, torture, and legal battles ===
On October 14, 1870, a Chinese prostitute named Sing Yu was abducted from Los Angeles. Her owner, Sing Lee, of the See Yup company, posted a reward of $100 for her return. (This was the second time Sing Lee offered a reward for Sing Yu. She had been abducted previously on August 25, and recovered the same day.) Both the City Marshal, William C. Warren, and Constable Joseph G. Dye ascertained Sing Yu had been taken to San Buenaventura. Marshal Warren pursued Sing Yu to San Buenaventura. However, before Warren arrived, the Marshal of San Buenaventura arrested Sing Yu on information telegraphed by Officer Dye. Marshal Warren took possession of Sing Yu in Ventura, and returned her to Los Angeles on the morning of October 31. Warren and Dye both claimed to be entitled to the reward for Sing Yu. That afternoon, both Warren and Dye attended a hearing in Justice Trafford's Court. Following the hearing, Dye confronted Warren in the street and accused him of stealing the reward. Warren, anticipating a conflict, had a Derringer concealed behind his back, in his left hand. While arguing with Dye, Warren threw forward his left hand and fired his pistol at Dye's head. Warren's shot was ineffective, and both men then drew revolvers and started firing at one another. Warren was shot in the groin, and died the following day.

During this period, the See Yup Company divided into three; Hong Chow Company, headed by Yo Hing, the Nin Yung Company, headed by Sam Yuen, and the Hop Wo Company.

Sing Yu was released from jail on November 5. Three days later, Sing Yu was rescued from a group of five Chinese men who were discovered torturing her on the outskirts of San Bernardino. Sing Yu had been suspended over a fire and her legs & abdomen burnt, and her back cut lengthwise in several places. The five men, members of Yo Hing's company, were arrested and indicted for attempted murder. The following day, Yo Hing swore out a warrant against a resident of San Bernardino named Que Ma. Yo Hing accused Que Ma of stealing a horse two years prior. Que Ma was arrested in San Bernardino by Officer Dye, and brought to Los Angeles on November 12. While Que Ma was being held in custody in Los Angeles, the five men involved in the torture of Sing Yu were tried, and four were found guilty of an assault to do great bodily injury. Ah Chu, Ah Yok, Lee Jung, and Wang Hing were each sentenced to pay a fine of $500 each, or in default, to spend two years in the State Penitentiary. On November 29, the case against Que Ma was dropped since no witnesses appeared against him in court. On his person was found a summons from the County Court of San Bernardino requiring his presence at the torture trial that had already concluded. Yo Hing was required to pay the cost of the Que Ma's trial.

On December 8, Sing Yu filed a complaint against Lee Woo, of Anaheim, for grand larceny; it is possible this complaint was related to the abduction that occurred on October 14. Lee Woo was arrested on December 17, and a trial was scheduled for December 23 in Justice Gray's Court. However, the evening before the trial, the Deputy Sheriff of Santa Barbara county arrived in Los Angeles and arrested Sing Yu on a charge of grand larceny. The Deputy Sheriff, along with Deputy US Marshal Dunlap, arrested Sing Yu in Negro Alley and placed her in a carriage belonging to city councilman George Fall. A group of men, belonging Yo Hing's company chased the carriage and caught up to it at Commercial street. Yo Hing's men fired four shots into the carriage, hitting a Chinese man named Wan, and killing one of the horses. The carriage escaped, and four of Yo Hing's men were arrested. The following day, the Los Angeles Daily Star reported the men convicted of torturing Sing Yu in San Bernardino were discharged from San Quentin, their charges having been overturned by the State Supreme Court.

In January 1871, Wong Heng, a wash house owner from San Bernardino, and his wife were passing through Los Angeles, on their way to China via San Francisco. Upon their arrival in Los Angeles, Yo Hing accused Wong Heng of having informed on the four Chinese men that roasted Sing Yu, and demanded Wong Heng compensate him. Wong Heng refused. The following day, Wong Heng and his wife got on the cars to leave for San Francisco. However, before the cars departed, Wong Heng and his wife were arrested on a complaint made by one of Yo Hing's agents. Additionally, another of Yo Hing's agents, Lee Yee, filed a suit against Wing Heng, using a forged contract that purported to show Wong Heng borrowed $600, and agreed to repay the amount before returning to China. All of Wong Heng's money was confiscated by the jailer, Frank Carpenter, until the cases could be settled.

In early March, Chow Chee, a friend of Wong Heng, came to Los Angeles from San Francisco. Yo Hing suspected Chow Chee came to defend Wong Heng. So to dispose of Chow Chee, two of Yo Hing's agents, Lee Yee and Quang You, filed a complaint at Justice Gray's Court that Chow Chee tried to employ a man for four hundred dollars to kill Lee Yee and Quang You. A trial was held on March 4, and concluded on March 7. Justice Gray dismissed the complaint, and required the complainants to pay the costs for their malicious prosecution. Yo Hing, then "filled with baffled rage against Wong Heng, Chow Chee and their friends and company", sent Lee Leeung to steal the wife of Heng Shun. Lee Leeung, accompanied by three others, went to Heng Shun's house, and took away his wife, Yut Ho. She was dragged up to Judge Trafford's office, and there, against her will and without knowing what was going on, was put through the forms of a marriage ceremony, and afterwards carried away by Lee Leeung in a carriage. Heng Shun then had her brought before Judge Ygnacio Sepulveda, on a writ of habeas corpus, and the Judge made an order that she should be returned to Heng Shun. As soon as the Judge made the order, Yo Hing's friends rushed at Yut Ho and forcibly carried her off. Police officers brought her back and restored her to her husband, Later that night, another writ of habeas corpus was issued, and Yut Ho was brought before Judge Murray Morrison and was given over to Lee Leeung, and carried away.

=== The death of Thompson ===
On the afternoon of October 24, hearings were held in Justice Gray's Court concerning a shooting that occurred the day before in Negro Alley. Ah Choy (Won Choy), the brother of Yut Ho, and Won Yu Tak were accused of attempting to murder Yo Hing. And Yo Hing was accused to attempting to murder Ah Choy. Following the hearing, the parties returned to Negro Alley.

About one hour after the hearings, Constable Jesus Bilderrain went to the corner of the Coronel building and remained there for five minutes. Negro Alley was quiet, so he proceeded to Caswell & Ellis, on the opposite side of Arcadia Street. There he was told that Caswell had sold a large number of pistols during the last few days. Bilderrain left Caswell's and patrolled the area, going around the Pico House and stopping at Higby's Saloon, at the corner of Main and Arcadia.

According to an article published by Sam Yuen, Ah Choy was "eating his evening meal at a back part of a house on the east side of Negro Alley and heard a fuss, went out to the front door; Yo Hing and three others were around with pistols, and one of them shot Ah Choy in the neck. Yo Hing and the others then ran down the stairs at the corner" of Aliso and Los Angeles street.

Bilderrain was on horseback at the corner Main and Arcadia, speaking with Constable Estevan Sanchez, when he heard shots. He rode off in the direction of Negro Alley and instructed Sanchez to follow. He saw a group of Chinese men in the corridor of the Beaudry building shooting at one another. He started to follow one group of men that ran into the Beaudry Building and noticed a Chinese man laying wounded in the doorway. He proceeded to arrest a Chinese man with a gun, with the assistance of Ventura Lopez and Juan Espinosa. Another group of men had retreated to the Coronel Adobe and were shooting at Adolf Celis and Constable Hester. While escorting the arrested man to jail, Bilderrain passed in front of Sam Yuen's store, the third door from the corner in the Coronel Building, and saw a Chinese man with a pistol in his hand. He left Lopez and Espinosa intending to arrest the man at Sam Yuen's store. Bilderrain instructed Sanchez to arrest another man, but did not specify which one. The man at Sam Yuen's store fired at Bilderrain and immediately closed and locked the door. Bilderrain and Sanchez each went through different doors, through the house, and into a corral in the back of the Coronel Adobe. There they encountered a group of armed men. Bilderrain attempted to arrest the man he was following, was shot in the shoulder and dropped his pistol. Sanchez was fired upon, and shot three times in response. Both men then retreated. A group of men pursued Bilderrain through Gene Tong's store, and out of the building. Once outside, Bilderrain supported himself on a post at the corner of the corridor and blew his police whistle. Three men came out of the adobe and shot at Bilderrain before retreating back into the house. One of the shots hit Jose Mendibles in the leg. Sanchez came running down the corridor and was approaching the door of Sam Yuen's store. A crowd standing by Caswell & Ellis' warned him not to go near the door because they were firing from inside. Sanchez approached the door from the right, and looking inside saw Sam Yuen who raised his pistol; both men fired simultaneously. Other men inside fired also. At this time Robert Thompson appeared and approached the door from the left. Both Sanchez and Celis warned Thompson to stay back. Sanchez retreated to the corner to reload his gun, and was given another gun. While Sanchez was away from the door, Thompson fired two shots into Sam Yuen's store. One shot was fired from inside and hit Thompson in the breast. Thompson said "I'm killed." Celis helped take Thompson to Wollweber's Drug store where he later died. Sam Yuen and his brother escaped, disguised like cooks, with aprons. And Yo Hing hid in Alec's barber shop.

After the shooting had subsided, and the doors to the Coronel Adobe closed, Frank Baker, City Marshal, assigned men to guard the house with instructions to allow no Chinese men to leave. Men were placed on Sanchez street, Negro Alley, and at the Plaza. Lawmen came and went as a larger crowd gathered along the edges of Chinatown, acting as a guard to prevent any Chinese person from escaping. Informed of the growing crowd, three-term Mayor Cristobal Aguilar, a longtime politician in the city, also surveyed the situation and then left. When news of Thompson's death passed through the city, along with the rumor that the Chinese community in Negro Alley "were killing whites wholesale", more men gathered around the boundaries of Negro Alley.

== The riot ==
The first victim of the mob was Ah Wing. The crowd captured Ah Wing, who appeared to have come from Beaudry's building. Marshal Baker searched him and found a "four barreled sharp-shooter, with one load out". Baker confiscated the gun and released him.

Ah Wing was captured again a short while later, this time armed with a hatchet. Constable Emil Harris took charge of Ah Wing. Harris and Charles Avery escorted Ah Wing towards the jail. A crowd of approximately 100 men followed them up Arcadia and Main street. Then, at the intersection of Main and Spring, Avery was hit from behind, the crowd took Ah Wing and held Harris. Ah Wing was led up to Tomlinson's Corral and there hanged from the cross beam of the gate. This was the same gate where Michel Lachenais was hanged less than a year before. Harris then returned to the Coronel Building.

Agustus Cates was standing guard on Arcadia street in front of the Coronel Adobe. The door started to open. Cates told the occupants to close the door, but they did not. So a police man ordered one of the guards to fire his Derringer at it. The door was closed and Cates and the others moved away from it. Later, when they had their back to the door, watching the other side of the street, the door opened and three shots were fired. Cates turned around just in time to see the door close again.

Later, another door opened, this time facing on Negro Alley. A Chinese man came rushing out, thirty or forty shots were fired. He made it less than ten feet before he fell. C. Dennuke stated during the Coroner's inquest that this man was Ah Cut. Another man inside the house, standing at a large window, drew a curtain aside, and several parties came up and fired into the window with shotguns and pistols.

According to Henry Hazard, there was considerable shooting at the building. Shortly afterward men started to scale the building with a ladder. He recognized Charles Austin as being the first to mount the building. At one point, Sheriff Burns counted 11 men on the roof. Various witnesses also identified Rufugio Botello, Jesus Martinez, J. C. Cox, Sam Carson, and "Curly" Crenshaw being on the roof. Men on the roof shot at the Chinese in the backyard of the building. Then someone passed up axes and the men started cutting holes in the roof. It was reported that ten holes had been cut. Men started firing through the ceiling into one of the rooms, causing the occupants to run out of the house.

J. C. Cox testified, one man ran out of the house, the mob on the street started firing. Cox saw him crawl back, and volunteered to go in and get the man out. He obtained a ball dipped in alcohol, lit it, and threw it into the room. He then went in, found the wounded man and carried him out and across the street. The crowd then mustered the courage to enter the building, found two Chinese men in that room and pulled them out. Hazard testified that at this point the crowd started breaking in the doors and removing the occupants; working their way towards the corner. The Daily Star reported the first door was battered down at approximately 8:45 pm.

Groups of men started leading the Chinese away from Negro Alley. Marshal Baker, Sheriff Burns, officers Hester and Harris individually gave parties instructions to take the Chinese to jail for safety. Harris' impression was that the groups proceeded to the jail, even though he was likely aware Ah Wing had been hanged. Some of the groups did in fact lead their captives safely to the county jail. But other groups led men to either Tomlinson's corral or John Goller's wagon shop to be hanged. Henry Hazard and General John Baldwin remonstrated with the lynching parties to no avail; Hazard at Goller's shop, and Baldwin at Tomlinson's corral. One group of men, consisting of C. White, John Lazzarovich, and brothers Robert and Walter Widney, managed to rescue four Chinese from the mob near Tomlinson's. Constable Billy Sands managed to rescue four; one from Antione Silva near Goller's shop. At about 9:20 pm, Sheriff Burns addressed the crowd, and requested 25 volunteers to help preserve the peace and guard the building until the morning.

== Events ==
Rioters climbed to the rooftops of buildings where Chinese immigrants resided, used pickaxes to puncture holes in the roofs, and shot at the people inside. Those who fled outside were shot at by gunmen on the roofs. Many were also beaten and tortured.

By the end of the riot:

The dead Chinese people in Los Angeles were hanging at three places near the heart of the downtown business section of the city; from the wooden awning over the sidewalk in front of a carriage shop; from the sides of two "prairie schooners" parked on the street around the corner from the carriage shop; and from the cross-beam of a wide gate leading into a lumberyard a few blocks away from the other two locations. One of the victims, Dr. Chee Long "Gene" Tong, was hanged without his trousers and minus a finger on his left hand.

Historian Paul de Falla wrote that the trousers were taken to get to his money, and his finger was cut to take a diamond ring.

The mob ransacked practically every Chinese-occupied building on the block and attacked or robbed nearly every resident. A total of 19 Chinese immigrant men were killed by the mob.

=== Victims ===
The following people were lynched:

- Ah Wing
- Dr. Chee Long "Gene" Tong, physician
- Chang Wan
- Leong Quai, laundryman
- Ah Long, cigar maker
- Wan Foo, cook
- Tong Won, cook and musician
- Ah Loo
- Day Kee, cook
- Ah Waa, cook
- Ho Hing, cook
- Lo Hey, cook
- Ah Won, cook
- Wing Chee, cook
- Wong Chin, storekeeper

The following people were shot and killed at the Coronel Adobe building:

- Johnny Burrow
- Ah Cut, liquor maker
- Wa Sin Quai

The Associated Press sent a report that night at 9 pm to the San Francisco Daily Examiner, detailing an on-the-spot account. It estimated the mob was about 500 people, which would have constituted eight percent of the city's population of nearly 6,000 people, including all men, women and children. The victims were buried in the City Cemetery, which was eventually taken over by the city. The northern portion of the cemetery is occupied by the Ramón C. Cortines School of Visual and Performing Arts.

== Coroner's inquest ==
The inquest covered an entire four days and encompassed interviewing of various range of eyewitnesses. Disappointedly, no data from the inquest was ascertained, known hitherto, and newspaper feedbacks serving as the sole source of information. Firstly, the two interviews involving Robert Thompson, which took two hours, emerged to be broad and elaborate. Still, only a single observer, Constable Bilderrain, was examined. His description of the event was reliant on facts and was apprehensive that Thompson got shot in the process of assisting him. In the process of pursuing justice for the murdered Chinese victims, utterly innocent of the Massacre, seven men were sentenced in the law court, whether unquestionably guilt-ridden or not. The Supreme Court omitted the prosecution on Gene killings. Further, it is crystal clear that there was no basis in the High court verdict that compelled them to trust the sentenced demonstrators were blameless. The District Attorney and Judge felt in 1873 that it was becoming unrealistic and illogical to pursue new trials; the issue was called off. Since then, the Chinese community performs an exceptional prayer at the city in honor of the carnage and misfortune.

== Grand jury and indictments ==
Following the coroner's inquest, Tong Yu, widow to Dr. Gene Tong, filed a complaint in the Justice Court, accusing Yo Hing, one of the tong leaders, of "inciting and participating" the massacre that led to her husband's death. While Yo was initially held following the November 4 complaint, the Grand Jury could not link him directly with the events, and he was later released.

Four days after this complaint, County Court Judge Ygnacio Sepulveda convened a special Grand Jury to investigate the events around to the massacre. A jury composed of individuals of diverse backgrounds, Juan Jose (long-time resident), William Perry (building contractor), Kaspare Cohn (building contractor), William Henry Workman (saddle maker and councilman), and Martin Sanchez (farmer), was constituted. Judge Sepulveda condemned the violence pattern in the strongest terms possible and challenged the jury to stand up to the occasion. The jury's report noted forty-nine indictments for felonies and murders (almost split halfway). The report highlighted full statements of the events leading to the massacre. Immediately after the report's publication, A.R. Thompson, Charles Austin, and Charles Crawford (official records Edmund Crawford) were held. Another set of five individuals, Louis Mendel, Jesus Martinez, Andreas Soeur, Patrick McDonald, and D.W. Moody, were arrested and held. Three Chinese people and two whites were held, but for lesser charges, an additional five unnamed individuals were held.

== Trials ==
=== People v. Kerren ===
The first case to go to trial was People v. Kerren. Constable Richard Kerren was on Los Angeles Street during the initial barricade of the Coronel Adobe when a door opened, and he, along with several others, fired into the doorway. A person in the crowd shouted, "don't fire, boys, it's a woman." However, fifteen or twenty shots were fired at two women standing inside the building, Cha Cha and Fan Cho. Kerren was identified as one of the shooters and was indicted on two counts of assault with a deadly weapon. On January 5, 1872, He was found not guilty on the first charge. And the case was dismissed the following day, on the grounds that it would be impossible to obtain a conviction.

=== People v. Ah Shaw, et al. ===
Lee Saow (aka Ah Shaw), Quong Wong (aka Quong Wan), and Ah Ying (aka Ah Yeng) were indicted for the murder of Won Choy. who was shot in the neck during the initial affray on the afternoon of October 24. The trial was held on February 14, 1872. Lee Saow's name was misspelled on the indictment, so his case was set aside. The trial of Wong and Ying proceeded as scheduled. The prosecution's witness, Ah Ling testified seeing both defendants on Los Angeles Street at the time of the shooting, However, Ling admitted he did not see the shooting, nor did he see either defendant with a gun. Further questioning revealed Ling had been instructed to point-out Wong to an officer, but he was unable to recall who instructed him. District Attorney Cameron Thom then admitted the prosecution failed to establish their case, and chose not to proceed any further. The defense called no witnesses. And the judge instructed the jury to "bring in a verdict of not guilty, as there was nothing in evidence adduced that could possibly justify conviction."

=== People v. Crenshaw, et al. ===
In People v. Crenshaw, the case pursued the murder of Gene Tong. The indictment alleged the defendants "did feloniously, unlawfully, deliberately, premeditatedly, and of their malice aforethought, stand by, aid, abet, assist, advise, counsel and encourage, unknown persons, to feloniously, unlawfully, etc., to kill and murder one Gene Tong," Cameron Thom limited the indictment to the murder of only one victim, Doctor Gene Tong. If Thom failed to secure a conviction for the murder of Dr. Tong, he could still prosecute the defendants as accessories for the murder of the 17 other victims. However, during a pre-trial hearing, the defense argued the indictment was insufficient because it failed to state Dr. Tong had in fact been murdered during the riot. Judge Widney's opinion on the challenge used one precedent and several statutes that implied that the indictment used words and language to "sufficiently state that Gene Tong is dead", and "enabled a person of common understanding to know what is intended."

The trial of Curley Crenshaw started on February 16. The jury was selected and testimony commenced the same day. Several prosecution witnesses testified seeing Crenshaw on the roof of the Coronel building. Benjamin McLaughlin testified seeing Crenshaw climb onto the roof, and heard him boasting to others about killing three Chinese. However, defense witnesses, and Crenshaw himself, testified that he was on the roof aiding officers Harris and Gard who were attempting to put out a fire. Harris was called to testify for the prosecution, and Gard was called to testify for the defense. The jury deliberated for 20 minutes and returned a guilty verdict for manslaughter.

In late February, Lewis Mendel's defense team proposed to join Mendel's trial with Alvarado, Austin, Botello, Celis, Johnson, Martinez, McDonald, Moody, and Scott. Jury selection had already begun the week before, but it was decided to limit the venires to only those residents of Los Angeles County who speak and understand the English Language. By March 16, a jury of twelve men was selected, but only after calling two hundred and fifty-five prospective jurors. It took over three weeks to empanel the jury, due to so many people either having already formed an opinion, or who were sympathetic with vigilance committees. During the trial, defense attorneys Edward J. C. Kewen and James G. Howard presented a motion to strike all testimony on the grounds the prosecution failed to prove Gene Tong was dead. When that motion was overruled, they motioned to strike the testimony of the police and the coroner claiming the identity of Gene Tong was derived from Chinese sources. That motion was also overruled. The case ended with seven defendants being found guilty of manslaughter. Celis and Moody were acquitted. And the remaining defendant, J. G. Scott, was never tried.

Following the verdict in the Mendel case, Refugio Botello filed an appeal and was admitted to bail in the sum of $5,000. Sentencing was passed on Saturday, March 30, 1872, with each man receiving a sentence of between two and six years at the State Penitentiary. On April 7, Sheriff Rowland and former Sheriff Burns escorted the prisoners to San Quentin.

=== Wing Chung Company v. City of Los Angeles ===
While the convicted rioters were sentenced and taken to the San Quentin, a few other cases remained. Such cases included Fong Yuen Ling, Sam Yuen, Yin Tuck, and Ah Yung v. The Mayor and Common Council of the City of Los Angeles, in which the merchants sued for damages to their stores during the massacre. The judge held that the city was not liable for the destruction of businesses and noted that such liability would only hold if the business owner had notified the city before the collapse.

The case was appealed to the Supreme Court of California where it was affirmed in January 1874. Judge Joseph B. Crockett wrote in his opinion, "... it appears from the uncontradicted testimony of the policeman, that when the shooting first commenced in the street, the plaintiffs' store and the corral in the rear of it were filled with armed Chinamen, who immediately fired on the officers when attempting to preserve the peace. It is in the highest degree improbable that this large body of armed men could have assembled in the plaintiffs' store, and in a sheltered place in the rear of it, without their knowledge and privity. The leader of the rival company or faction had been shot at the day before, and plaintiffs offered themselves as bail for his assailants. The arming and assembling of Sam Yuen's clan doubtless had reference to an impending conflict between the two companies. If the plaintiffs had been anxious to prevent a riot, it is clear, from the proof, that they had ample opportunity to notify the Mayor, and to summon the police before the shooting commenced. But instead of requesting aid to prevent violence and bloodshed, it appears from the testimony of one of the officers that Sam Yuen resisted the interference of the police, and himself fired at the officer."

=== People v. Sam Yuen ===
Jesus Bilderrain swore out a complaint before Justice Trafford, accusing Sam Yuen of aiding and abetting the unidentified killer of Robert Thompson. However, Yuen remained incognito until March 1872. By that time, Bilderrain had misplaced the original warrant, so Trafford issued a second warrant. The Daily News insinuated that police were reluctant to arrest Yuen, on account of bribes from the Wing Chung company; as officers Harris and Gard were gifted Chinese embroidery the company.

Yuen was eventually arrested on March 30 by constable Frank Hartley, who was the latest addition to the police force. Sam had revolver hidden inside his coat sleeve when arrested. That same day, Yuen sought release on a writ of habeas corpus. A hearing began that afternoon. Adolfo Celis testified that he had seen Yuen carrying a revolver and running behind another Chinese man as both entered the Coronel Block at the time of the initial affray. Celis also saw Yuen exit the Coronel building and fire at Bilderain, after the wounded officer escaped the building. The defense attempted to call Chinese witnesses to dispute Adolfo's testimony, but the District Attorney objected. Several other witnesses were called, including Officer Esteban Sanchez who testified that Sam Yuen shot at him from inside the Wing Chung store. The habeas corpus hearing continued five days, at which point Judge Widney concluded Yuen should be held to answer before the next grand jury on a charge of manslaughter.

Sam Yuen's trial was held in November 1872 and ended with his acquittal. The jury rendered a verdict without any deliberation. The prosecution failed to link Thompson's shooting to Yuen. And his presence in the store was insufficient to prove he was an accessory before the fact.

== Freeing of the rioters ==
Following the verdicts in the case of People v. Mendel et al, Refugio Botello was released on bail of $5,000. Botello would remain free, pending the outcome of his appeal to the California Supreme Court. On May 21, 1873, the California Supreme Court overturned the convictions in People v. Mendel and People v. Crenshaw. The decision said that "the indictment on which Lewis Mendel, A. R. Johnson, Charles Austin, P. M. McDonald, Jesus Martinez, and Estevan A. Alvarado, were tried and convicted was fatally defective in that it failed to allege that Chee Long Tong was murdered." This flaw in the indictment had been debated during a pre-trial demurrer, where Judge Robert Widney concluded "... the words used, construed in the usual acceptance in common language, sufficiently state that Gene Tong is dead. In addition to the above, and under the same rule, the word murder, in its legal definition, shows the death of Gene Tong." The Los Angeles Daily News wrote, "The convicted parties escape full punishment for their crimes by a quibble, justice is complacent, and the eagle roosts high. Thus it goes."

There is, however, no clarity on whether the massacre led to any positive advancements towards the fight against crime. Anti-Chinese hate flared in the weeks that followed. Overt anti-Chinese violence died naturally after the proceedings. This notwithstanding, however, anti-Chinese feelings persisted and were expressed more subtly.

== Aftermath ==
Authorities arrested and prosecuted ten rioters. Eight were convicted of manslaughter at trial and sentenced to prison terms at San Quentin. Their convictions were overturned on appeal due to a legal technicality. The eight men convicted were:

- Alvarado, Esteban
- Austin, Charles
- Botello, Refugio
- Crenshaw, L. F.
- Johnson, A. R.
- Martinez, Jesus
- McDonald, Patrick M.
- Mendel, Louis

List of cases
Alvarado, Estefan (also Juan)	Indicted for murder – Guilty of manslaughter – Sentenced to four years
Armanta, Thomas	Alleged to have stolen the diamond ring from Pe Ne Tong (Gene Tong) – Escaped from the county hospital on 2/21/72
Austin, Charles	Indicted for murder – Guilty of manslaughter – Sentenced to five years
Botello, Refugio	Indicted for murder – Guilty of manslaughter – Sentenced to two years Admitted to bail in the sum of $5,000. The case was appealed to the State Supreme Court.
Carson, Samuel C.	Indicted for murder – Plead not guilty – People vs. Carson – Outcome unknown
Celis, Adolphus	Indicted for murder – Acquitted
Cox, J. C.	People vs. Cox. – Outcome unknown
Crawford, Edmond (also Edward)	Indicted for murder – Application for change of venire passed informally – Outcome unknown
Crenshaw, A. L. AKA Curley (also L. F.)	Indicted for murder – Guilty of manslaughter – Sentenced to three years
Dominguez, Ramon	Indicted for murder – People vs. Ramon Dominguez – Outcome unknown
Johnson, A. R.	Indicted for murder – Guilty of manslaughter – Sentenced to six years
Kerren, Richard	Two indictments for assault with a deadly weapon – Found not guilty on one count January 5, 1872, Case dismissed on the second count on the grounds that it would be impossible to obtain a conviction.
Martinez, Jesus	Indicted for murder – Guilty of manslaughter – Sentenced to four years
McDonald, Patrick (also MacDonald)	Indicted for murder – Guilty of manslaughter – Sentenced to five years
Mendell, Louis AKA Frenchy aka Fatty	Indicted for murder – Guilty of manslaughter – Sentenced to six years
Moody, D. W. (Dan.)	Indicted for murder – Acquitted
Ruiz, Ambrosio	Charged with participating in the riot arrested on 12/11/71 – People vs. Ambrosio Ruiz – Outcome unknown
Scott, J. G.	Indicted for murder – Outcome unknown
Silva, Antoine	Arrested during the Coroner's Inquest – Outcome unknown
Soeur, Andreas (Andres Sour/Saers)	Arrested – Case taken under consideration by the Grand Jury – Outcome unknown
Sotello, Carmen (also Carmen Lugo)	Arrested on the charge of being concerned in the riot and having robbed the Chinese doctor, Gene Long Tong of a gold watch and chain. – Admitted bail in the sum of $100 – Outcome unknown
Thompson, David	Arrested for burglary of the Episcopal Church and found to have stolen a watch from one of the victims hanged at Goller's. – Guilty – Sentenced to six years
Ah Yeng	People vs. Ah Shaw et al. – Charged with the murder of Ah Coy – Acquitted
Lee Saow (Ah Shaw)	People vs. Ah Shaw et al. – Outcome unknown
Qong Wong	People vs. Ah Shaw et al. – Charged with the murder of Ah Coy – Acquitted
Yo Duc	People vs. Yo Duc – Outcome unknown
Yuen, Sam	People vs. Sam Yuen – Indicted for the murder of Robert Thompson – Acquitted

The event was well-reported on the East Coast, and newspapers there described Los Angeles as a "blood stained Eden" after the riots. A growing movement of anti-Chinese discrimination in California climaxed in the passage of the Chinese Exclusion Act of 1882. After the event, the overall city's racial mindset did not change, as anti-Chinese sentiment increased in the years following. The growing racism led to the formation of organizations such as the Anti-Coolie Club in 1876 and hostile local press editorials.

Following the outbreak of violence, many of the Chinese residents initially left the area of Los Angeles, though they returned a month later to reoccupy sections of the Coronel block that had been damaged. By February, the community rebounded for New Years, but their celebrations were on a much smaller scale, as the Chinese population remained diminished after the riots.

Calle de los Negros was renamed as part of Los Angeles Street in 1877 and obliterated in its previous form in 1888 as Los Angeles Street was widened and extended to the Plaza. The Coronel Adobe where the Chinese massacre occurred was torn down in the late 1880s. As of 2021, the former site of the Coronel Adobe is approximately in the middle of North Los Angeles street, immediately east of the Garnier Building located at 419 North Los Angeles Street.

== In popular culture ==
L. P. Leung wrote about a main character involved with the 1871 massacre in The Jade Pendant (2013). This has been adapted as a Chinese-produced film of the same name, which was released in 2017 in North America.

The novel Daughters of the Sun and Moon by Lisa See, published in 2026, includes a reimagining of the events of the Night of Horrors.

== See also ==
- Bibliography of Los Angeles
- Outline of the history of Los Angeles
- Bibliography of California history
- Anti-Chinese sentiment in the United States
- Anti-Chinese violence in California
- Anti-Chinese violence in Oregon
- Anti-Chinese violence in Washington
- Asiatic Exclusion League
- Attack on Squak Valley Chinese laborers, 1885
- Chinatown, Los Angeles, California
- Chinese Americans
- Hells Canyon massacre, 1887
- History of the Chinese Americans in Los Angeles
- Lynching of Asian Americans
- Pacific Coast Race Riots of 1907
- Rock Springs massacre, 1885
- San Francisco riot of 1877
- Seattle riot of 1886
- Sinophobia & Yellow peril
- Scott Act, 1888 & Geary Act, 1892
- Tacoma riot of 1885
- Torreón massacre, 1911 in Mexico
- 2023 Monterey Park shooting
- List of homicides in California
