= Chinese Historical Society of Southern California =

Chinese Historical Society in LA

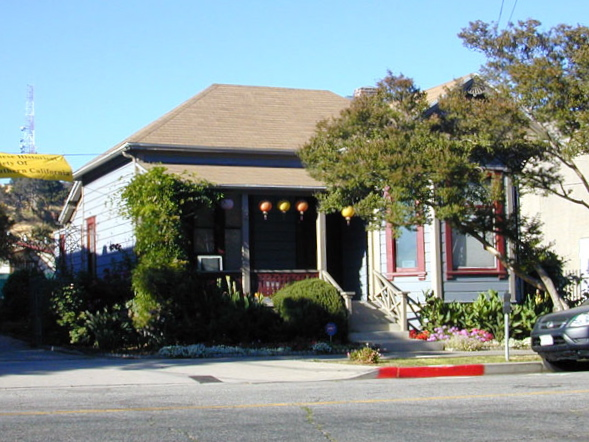
Chinatown Heritage and Visitor Center

Chinese Historical Society of Southern California (CHSSC, Chinese: 南加州華人歷史學會; pinyin: Nán Jiāzhōu Huárén Lìshǐ Xuéhuì) is an historical society and organization based in Los Angeles Chinatown, California. There are monthly meetings, field trips, archive and library collections, oral history projects, scholarships, and publications.

== History ==
On November 1, 1975, the CHSSC held its founding meeting at Cathay Bank in Los Angeles, California. Its key attendees included Paul Louie, William Mason, and Paul De Falla.

Its mission is:

- To bring together people with a mutual interest in the important history and historical role of Chinese and Chinese Americans in Southern California;
- To pursue, preserve and communicate knowledge of this history; and
- To promote the heritage of the Chinese and Chinese American community in support of a better appreciation of our rich, multi-cultural society.

The CHSSC purchased the site of their present building in Bernard Street in the mid 1990s, constructing a Chinatown Heritage & Visitors Center that is open to the public.

== Projects ==
CHSSC has published several books. Duty & Honor was published in 1998, celebrating Chinese American World War II veterans, and Portraits of Pride I (2004) & II (2012), which are collections of the biographies of high achieving but little known Chinese Americans.

In 1992, the society purchased a shrine built in 1880 and 42 surrounding burial places in Evergreen Cemetery, which they restored. It is now a registered historic monument.

== CHSSC honorees ==
Each year the Chinese Historical Society of Southern California honors Chinese Americans who have made significant contributions to the greater Los Angeles community. They have included:

- 2005 - Los Angeles Chinese American Pioneers in Law — Betty Tom Chu, Judge Rose Hom, You Chung Hong (1898-1977), Judge Ronald S.W. Lew (Chinese name: 刘成威), Judge Jennifer Lum, Judge Delbert Wong, and Debra Yang (Chinese: 楊黃金玉)
- 2006 - Chinese American Actors — including James Hong (Chinese: 吳漢章), Nancy Kwan (Chinese: 關家蒨), and Russell Wong (Chinese: 王盛德)
- 2007 - Los Angeles Chinese American Banking Pioneers — Preston Martin, F. Chow Chan, Cathay Bank (Chinese: 國泰銀行), East West Bank (Chinese: 華美銀行), Far East National Bank (Chinese:遠東國民銀行), First Public Savings, General Bank Trust Savings, Standard Bank, Golden Security Bank (金安銀行), Eastern International, and The Continental Bank
- 2008 - Chinese American Associations — Arcadia Chinese Association, Chinese American Association of Walnut, Diamond Bar Chinese American Association, San Gabriel Valley Chinese American Cultural Association, San Fernando Valley Chinese Cultural Association, South Bay Chinese Woman's Association, South Coast Chinese Cultural Association, South Pasadena Chinese American Club, and Ventura County Chinese American Historical Society
- 2009 - Chinese Americans in Sports — Michael Chang (Chinese: 張德培), Tennis player; Tiffany Chin (Chinese: 陳婷婷), Olympian; Bob Chow, Olympian; Norm Chow (Chinese: 周友賢), football Coach; Lawrence Hom, volleyball player; Cameron Inouye, WNBA Referee; Carol Jue, college basketball head coach; Kim Ng, Los Angeles Dodgers; Jon Soo Hoo, sports photographer; Richard Tom, Olympian; Charles B. Wang (Chinese: 王嘉廉), Owner of New York Islanders Hockey Club; Kevin Wong, volleyball player; Annie Yee, cheerleader; Chinese American Athletic Association; and the Chinatown Firecracker Run Committee

In 2019, the CHSSC participated in the "Gatherings: Collecting and Documenting Chinese American History" exhibit for the Museum of Chinese in America.

== See also ==
- History of Chinese Americans in Los Angeles
- Chinese American Museum
- Chinese Culture Center
- Chinese Historical Society of America
- Museum of Chinese in America
- Weaverville Joss House State Historic Park
