= China City, Los Angeles =

Ethnic-theme tourist attraction (1938–1949)

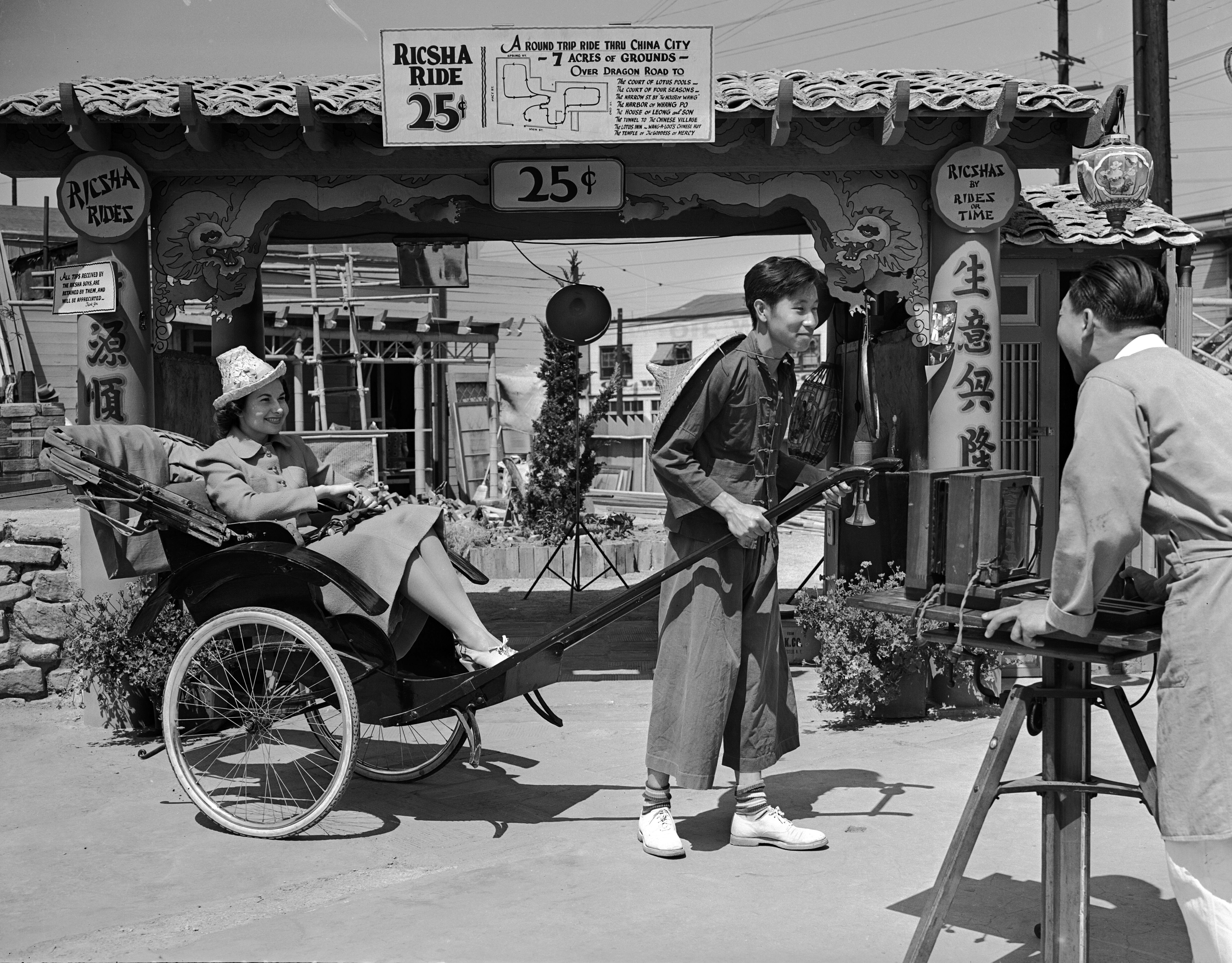
Ricsha [sic] ride concession, China City (1938)

China City, Los Angeles was a short-lived "Chinatown" tourist attraction developed by Christine Sterling, who also worked on the conversion of a neglected street into the Mexican-themed Olvera Street. She conceived of a similar plan for the displaced Chinese-American population following the demolition of Old Chinatown, Los Angeles.

On June 6, 1938, she opened China City, a walled enclave bounded by Main, Ord, Spring, and Macy (now Cesar Chavez), featuring Chinese-style architecture, restaurants, rickshaw rides, a lotus pond, and a temple. Costumed workers greeted tourists, and a Chinese opera troupe performed live shows in front of the shops. There were roughly 50 "colorful stores" in the development.

Some replica buildings in China City came from the set of the 1937 Hollywood blockbuster The Good Earth, including the "House of Wong" set. A dragon decoration was salvaged from the Los Angeles Times building. The architect was William Tuntke, and construction was supervised by Tom Kemp, from Paramount Studios. Gilbert Leong, who later was a prominent local architect, sculpted the statue of Kwan Yin that was set in a fountain for China City.

Chop Suey typography was the most common lettering style in China City, appearing on business and directional signs, and even on its entrance gates. It accounted for 42.7% of the lettering styles documented in China City, compared with 23.1% in New Chinatown and 4.5% in Old Chinatown.

The China City development was described in the 1941 American Guide to Los Angeles created by the Federal Writers' Project:

CHINA CITY (open 8 a.m - 2 a.m.), bounded by Ord, Main, Macy, and New High Sts, is an American-promoted, Chinese-operated amusement center designed to attract tourists. It was partly destroyed by fire early in 1939, but is now restored. The "city" stands out as an oriental oasis in the midst of Los Angeles' oldest section, which is being reclaimed in the Civic Center new-building program. The concessions grouped around a small plaza are visited in a rickshaw (25¢ per ride). Much of the construction material of the "city" was donated: pink sandstone from the old Federal Building was used for the gate, stairs, and walls, and the dedicatory stone of the entrance is from the old Times Building. Bamboo poles are from the Los Angeles Park Department, cobblestones from the Street Department.

China City received mixed support from Chinese American residents and businessmen. Many welcomed the economic opportunity the project provided. Others preferred the New Chinatown project, considered less distorted by the stereotyping lens of Hollywood. During its 11-year existence, China City was destroyed by fire and rebuilt numerous times. One fire destroyed approximately a quarter of China City in February 1939. In 1948, a fire destroyed China City, and the remaining structures were razed in 1955. As of 1988, there were a handful of elements from China City still visible in the "Ord Street parking lot," including the North Gate of China City and "remains of Shanghai street shop fronts".

== See also ==
- History of Chinese Americans in Los Angeles
