= China City of America =

Construction project in Thompson, New York, US

China City of America is a multi-phased construction project planned for the town of Thompson, Sullivan County, in the Catskill Mountains region of the U.S. state of New York. In December 2011, China City LLC applied to be a USCIS recognized EB-5 visa Regional Center, but the business was never approved. In 2013, China City America presented its idea to build a Chinese theme park, hotel, and casino for an estimated $6 billion. The town of Thompson declined to approve the project. The project stalled and its CEO, Sherry Xue Li, was arrested in 2022.

The current project, Thompson Education Center (TEC), is a proposed for-profit college for foreign students, situated in a 573-acre parcel which borders a state-protected wetland.

== Context ==
In December 2011, China City LLC applied to be a USCIS recognized EB-5 visa Regional Center, but the business was never approved by US Homeland Security. The EB-5 immigrant investor program grants permanent residency to foreign investors in exchange for job-creating investments in the United States. The 880 Regional Centers sponsor capital investment projects for foreign entrepreneurs seeking green card status. Approximately 85 percent of EB-5 participants are Chinese, but there is a quota system, and waits for Chinese applicants can be as long as 15 years.

More than a year later, in 2013, China City America publicly presented its idea to build a 2,200-acre Chinese theme park, hotel, and casino for an estimated $6 billion. According to The Economist, the plan "would attract 1.5 million visitors annually" and "transform the struggling economy" in upstate New York while attracting thousands of wealthy Chinese investors through the federal EB-5 visa program. The initial capital investment of $325 million would include $127.5 million from EB-5 investors, $132.5 million from equity investors, and $65 million from the U.S. government. According to the plan, Chinese investors would pay a $65,000 non-refundable deposit. Local, national, and international media articles conveyed a variety of interests and concerns about the project while local officials and residents expressed both hope and skepticism.

Sherry Xue Li, an Oyster Bay, Long Island businesswoman, has been the chief executive officer and founder of China City of America. Li reported to the Associated Press that she came to the US in 1991, at the age of 19, and has a background in development and finance. According to SEC records, Sherry Xue Li had been a major shareholder in BRS Group, Inc., a Delaware company dealing in scrap copper imports to China and China Electronic Holdings. Sherry Xue Li sold her stake in China Electronic in 2010 and BRS in 2011. According to The Daily Beast, "Li rarely, if ever, talks to the press, issuing her statements mainly through press releases in which she boasts of her meetings with Republican officeholders and Trump administration officials." The other officer of the Thompson Education Center is Mike Lianbo Wang who has appeared in a few TEC press releases.

At a May 2013 town council meeting where Sherry Li first pitched the project, she stated that "Each dynasty will have its building and will have rides go with it," China City’s website features golden dragons, and projects an initial investment of $325 million — with $10 million going to a "Temple of Heaven," $24 million on a hotel and entertainment complex, and $20 million to construct a 'Forbidden City.'" In its second meeting with the town council, Thomas J. Shepstone represented China City. Shepstone was known in the region as a defender of fracking. According to Paula Medley of the Basha Kill Area Association the project couldn't be developed on the scale proposed by China City without damaging environmentally sensitive wetlands.

In 2014, Town of Thompson supervisor Bill Rieber became frustrated with Li's constantly shifting plans and the Town of Thompson declined to approve the project, but the project was granted approval for three wells in 2016. In the same year, Sullivan County lawyer Jacob Billig sued China City of America for failing to pay him fees for service. A settlement was reached out of court for $25,000.

== Thompson Education Center ==
While the larger China City project stalled, the Thompson Education Center (TEC) was still being planned in 2017. The proposed for-profit college campus is on a 573 acre parcel of land near Route 17, Exit 112, which borders Wild Turnpike in Thompson, New York and extends to the town of Mamakating. The mostly undeveloped land for the project is in proximity to an environmentally protected wetland, the Harlen Swamp Wetland Complex. It is also near Monticello, New York, a village with a poverty rate of about 36 percent. TEC press releases promised that the "high-end" project would create at least 20,000 jobs. TEC added that "once the project is complete, there will be many job openings...including but not limited to professors, instructors, school book store and shop keepers, chefs, landscapers, cleaning, and maintenance workers." In August 2017, New York Construction Report said TEC would be constructed in three phases, developing 80 acres of land with 493 acres of open space.

Thompson Education Center plans to have a school of business, a film & arts school, and programs in nursing and medical training, culinary arts, high school equivalency and executive and vocational training. The project includes four classroom buildings, student dormitories, student townhouses and a student center. TEC claims to have entered into agreements with US and Chinese high schools, colleges, education institutions and systems to provide students to the institution. TEC claims also that it has been working with several U.S. accredited colleges on undergraduate programs and ESL programs.

In a January 2017 presentation to the Monticello Rotary, Sherry Li that claimed that China City had executed letters of understanding with the Catskill Regional Hospital for its nursing program, and with Phoenix, a Chinese media company that has educated 80,000 students. According to The Wall Street Journal, in June 2017 Lianbo Wang donated $329,500 to a joint fund between President Donald Trump’s campaign and the Republican National Committee (RNC). About $86,000 was diverted to the RNC’s legal fund. Politico also reported on the large donations by Wang and Li. In August 2017, Thompson Education Center appeared before the Town of Thompson, with a plan for a campus that would include 732 dorm rooms for 2,508 students, 276 homes for faculty members, and a college president’s house to be built in a “Founding Trustee Village.” Another source stated that the campus would also include a community center, three recreational buildings, three playgrounds, a sports stadium, a performing arts center, a library and museum, a conference center, a business center, a medical center and an inn for visitors. In September 2017, TEC sponsored a golf tournament benefiting the Catskill Regional Medical Center (CRMC) Foundation. Ms. Li also visited Congressman Steve Stivers, Chairman of the National Republican Congressional Committee, in Washington, D.C. In October 2017, at the Sullivan County Republican Committee, Sherri Lee stated that TEC would be opening an International Aviation College.

In 2018, residents sought for a revocation of a permit that the Fallsburg, New York building department had granted for a 9,000-square-foot building, claiming that the building was not a residential structure. The property is adjacent to the Thompson Education Center and is owned by Sherry Li. The May 17, 2018 Economist issue noted that Chinese media said that "investors in the scheme will find emigrating to America 'so easy.'" The current wait time for Chinese nationals to receive an EB-5 visa is about 15 years and a new regulation for EB-5 visas may substantially raise the price for obtaining a green card.

In January 2019, at the Ivy Football Association Dinner, TEC stated that they planned to provide application counseling, exam preparation and tutoring for students by The Butler Method. In February 2019, Thompson Education Center announced plans to offer the Ivy League Prep program, to give students with sports trauma treatment-related classes, noting that the courses could be "transferred to Ivy League universities for college credits." TEC also reported that the project received three well permits, and that the construction road was completed. The permits had been issued in 2016. TEC also reportedly signed contracts with universities and schools in China "to deliver 2,700 nursing program students every year." On a trip to Thailand in March 2019, Ms. Li met with the president of Thonburi University and discussed educational cooperation between TEC, its partners schools and colleges, and the Bangkok school. In the same press release, TEC reported that

College Town covers an area of 650 acres, with over 5 million square feet of the construction area for educational campus and ancillary facilities. TEC has partnered with many prestigious universities in United States, planned to establish courses including, business schools, media arts, medical academies, culinary, various MBAs, special license training, high schools and their affiliated facilities to create an intelligent high-end university community. In 2019, Thompson Education Center will work with International University Alliance under the Ministry of Education to open 50 Thompson Education Center Extension campuses in China.

== Campaign contributions and other businesses ==
In 2014, Sherry Li donated a combined $55,000 to New York Governor Andrew Cuomo. Since then, Thompson Education Center and its officers Sherry Li and Since then Mike Lianbo Wang have donated money to several other political campaigns, including $600,000 to the Trump Victory Committee. According to local news, Li "has not been shy about touting her access to Trump and key players in his orbit." According to The Daily Beast "Where Li got the money to make the sizeable contributions is only slightly less mysterious than Li herself."

- 2012 (David Vitter)
- 2014 (Andrew Cuomo, Bob Goodlatte)
- 2016 (Republican National Committee, Sue Googe, Donald Trump)
- 2018

Name	Amount
Republican National Committee	$564,600
National Republican Congressional Committee	$87,800
New York Republican Federal Campaign Committee	$20,000
Steve Stivers	$10,400
Chele Farley	$5,400
Great America Committee	$5,000
Support to Ensure Victory Everywhere PAC	$5,000
Tenacious PAC	$5,000
Kevin McCarthy	$2,500
Lindsey Graham	$1,000

The residence of Sherry Li and Mike Wang is also the headquarters of several New York businesses, including one that promotes the United Nations and Chairman Mao Zedong.

=== Businesses ===
Business Name	Year Started
UNITED NATIONS MAO ZEDONG FOUNDATION, LIMITED	2017
CHINA-US ENTREPRENEUR SUMMIT, LIMITED	2017
TEC OFFICE, L.P.	2016
TEC GROUPHOUSE UNIT, L.P.	2016
CFS ASSET MANAGEMENT, INC.	2014
CHINA CITY OF AMERICA REAL ESTATE DEVELOPMENT	2014
THOMPSON B-1 EB-5, L.P.	2013
THOMSPSON (sic) B-1 EQUITY, L.P.	2013
WXS INTERNATIONAL, LLC.	2012
CHINA CITY OF AMERICA GROUP, L.P.	2011
CHINA CITY OF AMERICA, INC.	2011

== Arrest of Sherry Xue Li and Mike Wang ==
In July 2022, Sherry Xue Li and Mike Wang were charged in connection to a $27 million investment fraud scheme in which they allegedly promised investors "green cards, access to political figures, and dividends on their money. Tens of millions of dollars came in from investors and straw donors, who expected their money would bear fruit."

== See also ==
- Campaign finance
- Chinatown, Manhattan (紐約華埠)
- Chinatowns in Brooklyn (布魯克林華埠)
- Chinatowns in Queens (法拉盛華埠)
- Chinese Americans
- Chinese Americans in New York City
- EB-5 visa
- Mao Zedong
