= Golden Security Bank =

- Industry: Banking
- Founded: August 27, 1982; 43 years ago
- Defunct: August 24, 2011; 14 years ago
- Fate: Acquired by First General Bank
- Headquarters: Rosemead, California

Golden Security Bank was a bank headquartered in Rosemead, California, with operations in Southern California. The bank catered to Chinese-Americans in low- and moderate-income areas. In 2011, the bank was acquired by First General Bank.

== History ==
The bank was established on August 27, 1982 in the Chinatown neighborhood of Los Angeles.

In October 2005, the bank's headquarters were moved to Rosemead, California.

In 2009, state regulators ordered the company to raise capital.

In 2011, the bank was acquired by First General Bank.
