= Christine Sterling =

American preservationist (1881–1963)

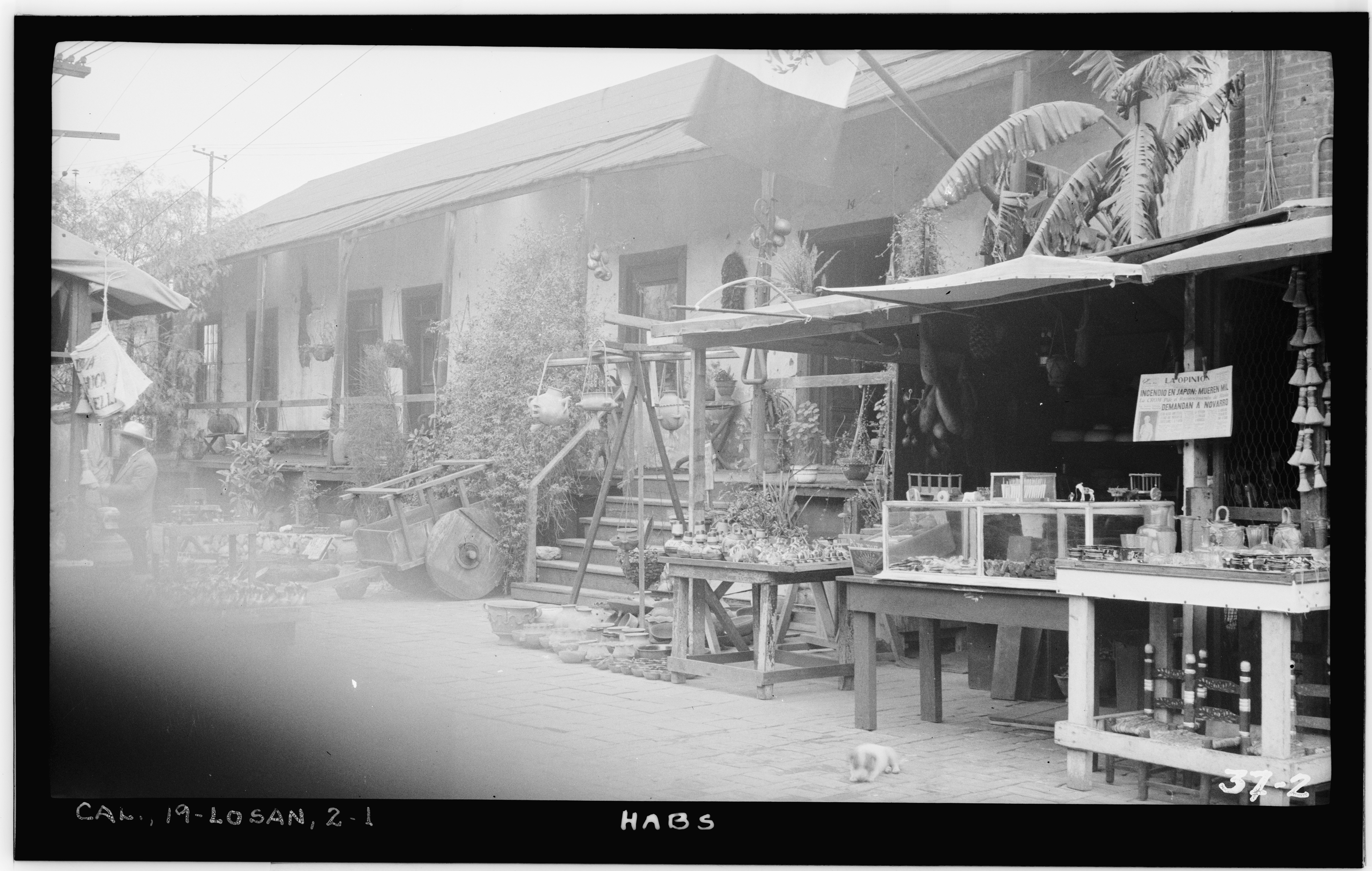
1934 HABS documentation of the Avila Adobe, soon after the opening of Olvera Street.

Chastina Rix (1881–1963), later known as Christine Sterling, was born in Oakland, California. Her most notable works were as a preservationist who helped save the Avila Adobe and created Olvera Street in Los Angeles. She also helped create China City.

"The booklets and folders I read about Los Angeles were painted in colors of Spanish-Mexican romance,...They were appealing with old missions, palm trees, sunshine and the ‘click of the castanets.’"— Christine Sterling, journal

== Early life ==
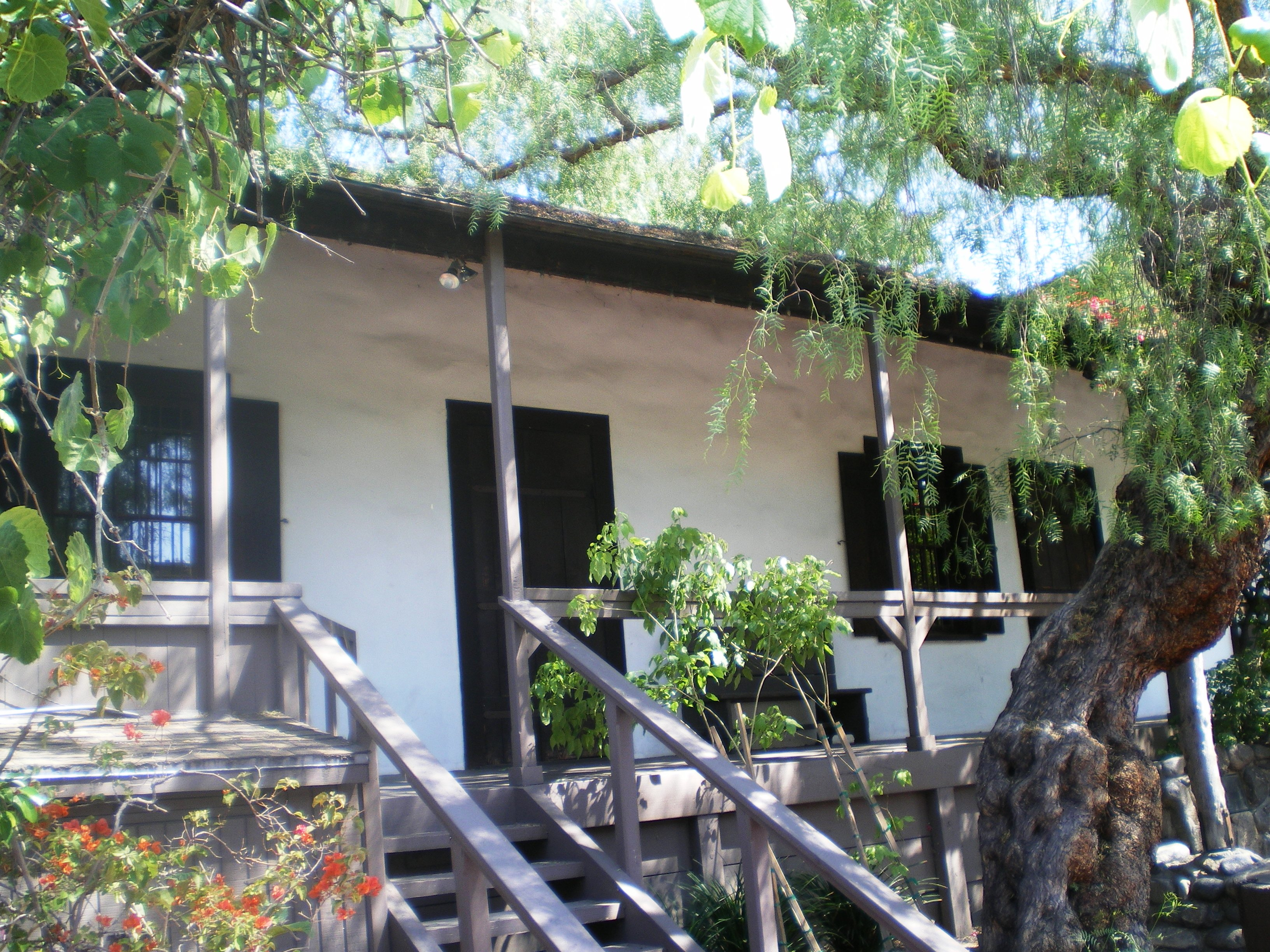
Avila Adobe, 2008

Christine Sterling was born Chastina Rix in Oakland, Alameda County, California on 5 November 1881, one of four children of Edward Austin Rix and Kate Elizabeth Kiteridge. Her father was a mining engineer via UC Berkeley (Zeta Psi) and inventor of the "Rix Rock Drill", later a vineyard planter. He was born to Chastina Walbridge Rix and Alfred Stevens Rix (1822-1904), a San Francisco Committee of Vigilance leading member and San Francisco justice of the peace from New Hampshire. He left for the gold fields of California in 1852 and married Chastina Walbridge in 1849 in Vermont. Later in 1858 he married Margaret Arabella Tuite in California.

Chastina changed her name to Christine as a teenager, and briefly studied art and design at Mills College in Oakland. After a brief first marriage, she married attorney Jerome Hough, a San Francisco attorney. They had two children, Peter (born on November 23, 1915, in Santa Clara County) and June (born on June 30, 1917, in Los Angeles County), later moving to Hollywood, and "found clientele through the entertainment business". By 1920 the family was living on Bonnie Brae Street near downtown Los Angeles. Hough abandoned the family and soon died from a stroke leaving Christine a widow without means.

"At last Los Angeles was home, The sunshine, mountains, beaches, palm trees were here, but where was the romance of the past?" — Christine Sterling, journal

By 1928 she had changed her last name to Sterling.

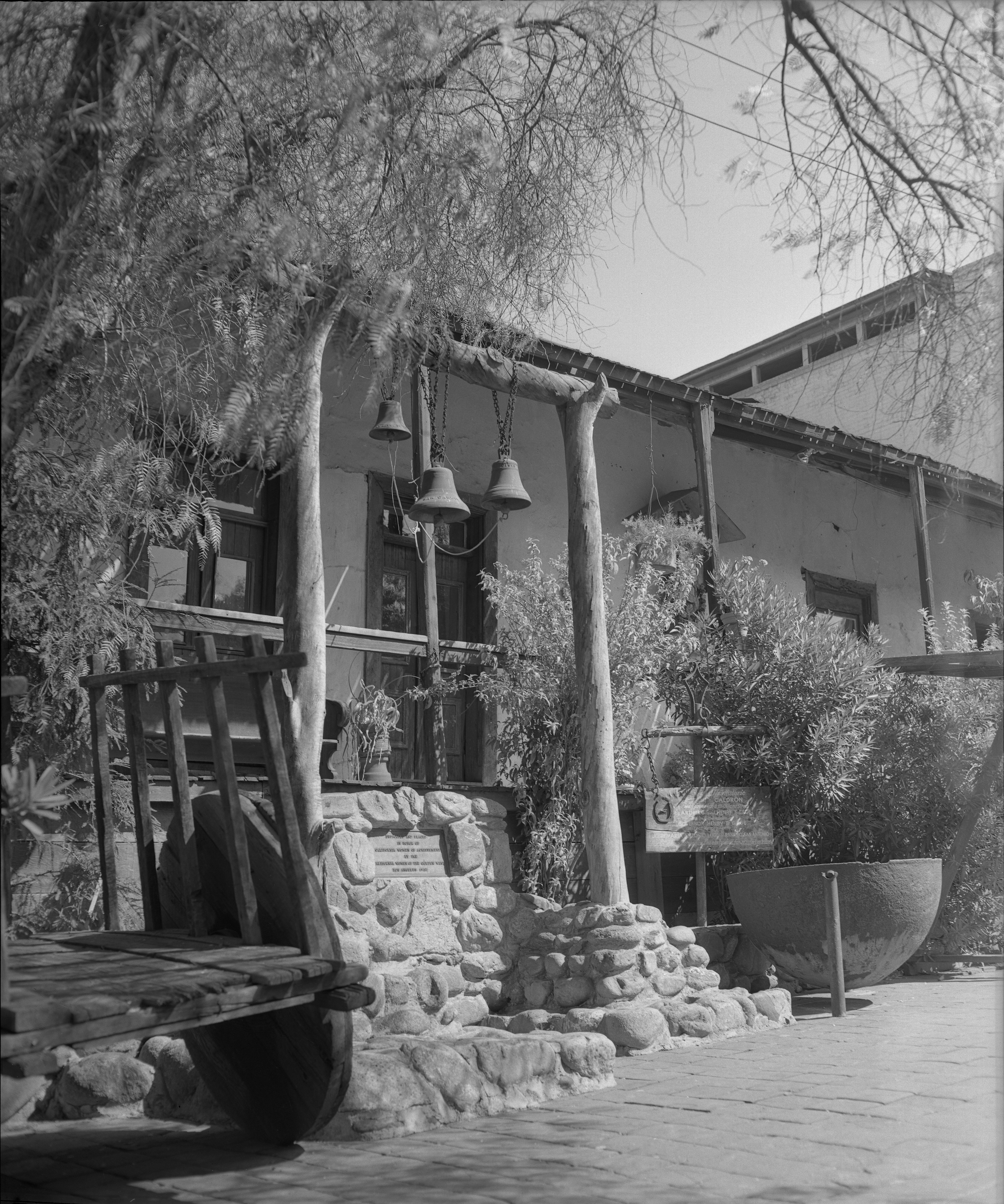
Avila Adobe,1956

== Olvera Street ==
In 1877, the small alley branching off of the Plaza de Los Ángeles, Wine Street, was officially renamed to Olvera Street, after Agustín Olvera.

"I closed my eyes and thought of the Plaza as a Spanish-American social and commercial center, a spot of beauty as a gesture of appreciation to México and Spain for our historical past." — Christine Sterling, 1933 booklet

Her explorations of the city led to her 1926 discovery of the decrepit Avila Adobe, which she later went on to preserve. Olvera Street opened to the public on Easter Sunday, April 19, 1930.

"It might be well to take our Mexican population seriously and allow them to put a little of the romance and picturesque into our city which we so freely advertise ourselves as possessing. The plaza should be converted into a social and commercial Latin American center." — Christine Sterling

Constance Simpson was a local business owner who opposed the redevelopment of Olvera Street and took Christine Sterling all the way to the California Supreme Court. Plaza de Los Angeles Incorporated had underwritten the marketplace construction. Simpson eventually lost her case because Sterling had the Los Angeles Times and Mayor's office support.

Chief of Police James E. Davis volunteered jail prisoner labor for Olvera's construction.

== China City ==
In 1939, Union Station opened, displacing Chinese residents. Sterling built a theme park near Olvera Street called China City that was not as successful as Olvera Street and was destroyed by fire in 1948.

== Death ==
Sterling lived in Chavez Ravine from 1938 to May 9, 1959, when the city began evicting residents for Dodger Stadium. Then, Sterling's home and office were in the Avila Adobe, where she died, at age 82, in 1963.

== Works ==
- Sterling, Christine (1933). Olvera Street: Its History and Restoration. Adobe Studios.
- Sterling, Christine (1947). Olvera Street: El Pueblo de Nuestra Señora la Reina de Los Angeles: Its history and transformation. Los Angeles: Mario Valadez.

== Sources ==
- Kropp Young, Phoebe Schroeder (June 21, 2006). California Vieja: Culture and Memory in a Modern American Place. University of California Press. ISBN 978-0-520-93165-7.
- Christine Sterling, June Sterling Park Olvera Street : El Pueblo De Nuestra Senora La Reina De Los Angeles : Its history and Restoration and The Life Story of Christine Sterling By Her Daughter 1947.
- Lynn A. Bonfield, New England to Gold Rush California: The Journal of Alfred and Chastina W. Rix, 1849-1854. Arthur H. Clark Co., Univ. of Oklahoma Press, 2011.
- Daily Journal of Alfred and Chastina W. Rix July 1849-May 1857
- Chastina W. Rix, Journal of My Journey to California, Peacham, Vt. 1853
