= New Year's Race, Los Angeles =

Annual half marathon in Los Angeles, CA, (US) held from 2013 to 2020

- Location: Downtown Los Angeles
- Event type: Road
- Distance: Half Marathon
- Primary sponsor: Jive Live
- Established: 2013 (13 years ago)
- Website: Official website

The New Year's Race, Los Angeles was an annual half marathon held every January in Los Angeles, California. The inaugural race took place in 2013, and the last one took place in 2020.

In addition to the half marathon, the other race options include a 5k, 10k, and a 9.3 Challenge for those doing the 10k plus 5k. Additionally, there is a Kid's Fun Run.

== History ==
The first half marathon, run in January 2013, featured 6,500 participants.

The race took place at night, ending shortly before midnight, on the first Saturday after New Year's Day, and regularly featured thousands of runners.

The race was organized by Jive Live.

The race had shorter distances through the years, with 2016 offering the final half marathon and the longest race of 2017 being a 15k, and in 2019, the longest race was the 9.3 challenge. The final race was run in 2020.

== Course ==
The half marathon began in Grand Park, in front of Los Angeles City Hall, lopped Dodger Stadium, ran through Elysian Park, Los Angeles, and also passed the Crypto.com Arena, Fashion District, Broadway Shopping District, and Chinatown, while finishing in Downtown Los Angeles, near Hope Street and 11th Street. The finish line held a celebratory festival in downtown Los Angeles.

== Races ==
The Kids Fun Run a 1-kilometer race, for children 5-12 years old, takes place before the other distances, starting at 4pm, with the 5k starting at 6pm, and the half marathon starting at 8pm.

== Winners ==
Year	Men's winner	City	Time	Ref.	Women's winner	City	Time	Rf.
2016	Paul Martelletti (USA)	London, CA	1:12:15		Andie Cozzarelli (USA)	Raleigh, NC	1:20:40	
2015	Jovanny Godinez Rodriguez (USA)	Hayward, CA	1:07:40		Rhea Deroian (USA)	Raleigh, CA	1:31:53	
2014	Luis Ibarra (USA)	Montebello, CA	1:10:45		Monserrat Zuiga (USA)	Guadalupe, CA	1:25:11	
2013	Luis Ibarra (USA)	Montebello, CA	1:08:51		Carla McAlister (USA)	San Clemente, CA	1:23:26	
