= Refik Anadol =

Turkish media artist and designer

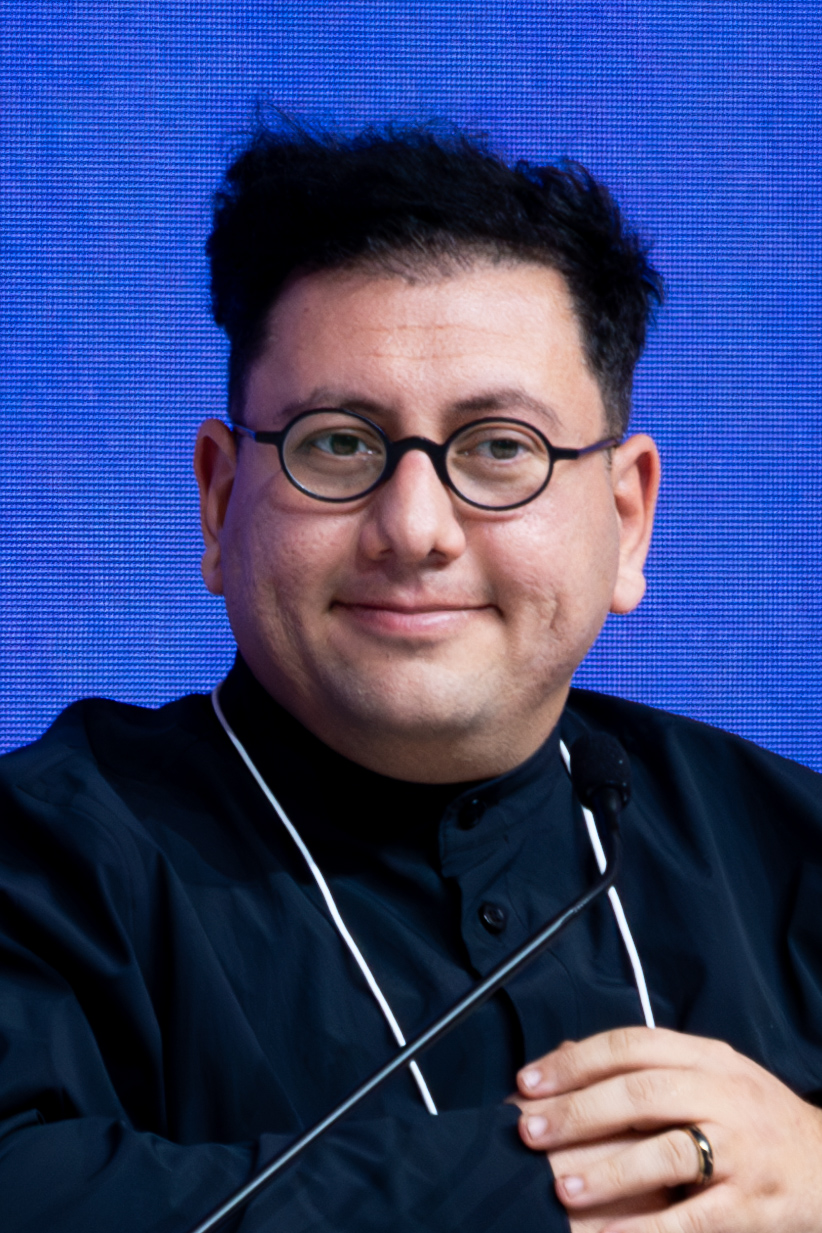
- Born: November 7, 1985 (age 40); Istanbul, Turkey
- Education: Bilgi University; UCLA
- Known for: Generative art
- Notable work: Machine Hallucinations; WDCH Dreams; Unsupervised; Archive Dreaming; Large Nature Model
- Movement: New media
- Awards: Time 100 Impact Award (2025); UCLA Edward A. Dickson Alumnus of the Year (2024); Lumen Gold Prize Award (2019)
- Website: refikanadol.com

Refik Anadol (born November 7, 1985) is a Turkish American media artist and the co-founder of Refik Anadol Studio and Dataland. Recognized as a pioneer in the aesthetics of data visualization and AI arts, his work merges art, technology, science, and architecture. Through media embedded into existing architecture, live audio-visual performances, immersive rooms, exhibitions, AI data paintings and sculptures, and digital collections, Anadol explores collective memories, humanity's relationship to nature, the perception of space and time, and human-machine collaborations. His work has been exhibited in more than seventy cities on six continents.

== Early life and education ==
Anadol was born and raised in Istanbul and grew up in a family of teachers. He taught himself basic programming on a Commodore 64 when he was eight. His connection to machines began with coding and video games.

Anadol saw Blade Runner for the first time when he was eight; his mother said the way he perceived his surroundings shifted the day after he saw the film. He was fascinated with its futuristic depiction of downtown Los Angeles, and transfixed by as a scene during which a replicant discovers that her memories are an implanted component of her machine mind, In a 2024 interview with the Financial Times, he said: "Since that moment, one of my inspirations has been that question: 'What can a machine do with someone else's memories?"

Anadol attended Istanbul Bilgi University, where he received a BA in photography and video in 2009 and an MFA in visual communication in 2011. In 2014 he earned an MFA in design media arts at UCLA. He was mentored by Casey Reas, Jennifer Steinkamp, and Christian Moeller.

== Career and selected works ==
=== 2008–2012: Data painting, Quadrature and Quadrangle, Istanbul Biennial ===
As an undergraduate, Anadol read a paper by Lev Manovich on augmented space. Manovich's assertion that collaborations between architects and artists could make the "invisible flow of data visible" triggered Anadol's imagination, and in 2008, he altered built space for the first time. Bringing a projector outside, he projected large-scale images onto a concrete to create the illusion of movement. Coining the term "data painting," the piece inspired Anadol to use light as material and data as pigment.

In 2010 he created "Quadrature" with Alican Aktürk, a fellow graduate student, at the SantralIstanbul Art and Culture Center's main gallery building. A live audio-visual performance that examined the relationship between architecture and media, Quadrature used video projection techniques to manipulate footage of quadrilaterals. He followed Quadrature with "Quadrangle" at SANAA School of Design in Essen, Germany, using the entire 360 degrees of the building as a canvas.

In 2011, he was invited to create a media installation at the Istanbul Biennial on the heavily trafficked İstiklal Avenue. He created a site-specific large-scale interpretation of sounds he recorded during different times of day, and used nine projectors to project reinterpreted images. The work was titled "Augmented Structures v1.0".

Anadol's first solo exhibition, Sceptical Interventions, was held at the Piveneli Gallery in Istanbul in early 2012. Later that year he moved to Los Angeles to attend UCLA's Design Media Arts program. The first place he went after his arrival was downtown Los Angeles. ^{[6]}

=== 2013–2016: Visions of America: Amériques, Infinity Room, Google AMI ===
In 2013, at Microsoft Research's annual Design Expo, Anadol presented his idea to use the external walls of Walt Disney Concert Hall as a canvas. His presentation brought him to the attention of Gehry Technologies, and with the support of Gehry and his team, Anadol was offered the use of the original 3D model of the concert hall. For his 2014 thesis project, with assistance from architects and UCLA researchers, he created a site-specific architectural video installation inside the concert hall that accompanied a Los Angeles Philharmonic performance of Edgard Varèse's Amérique. Titled "Visions of America: Amériques," Anadol used algorithmic sound analysis to listen and respond to the music in real-time. He tracked conductor Esa-Pekka Salonen's heartbeat with a sensor and used a 3-D camera system to integrate Salonen's movements.

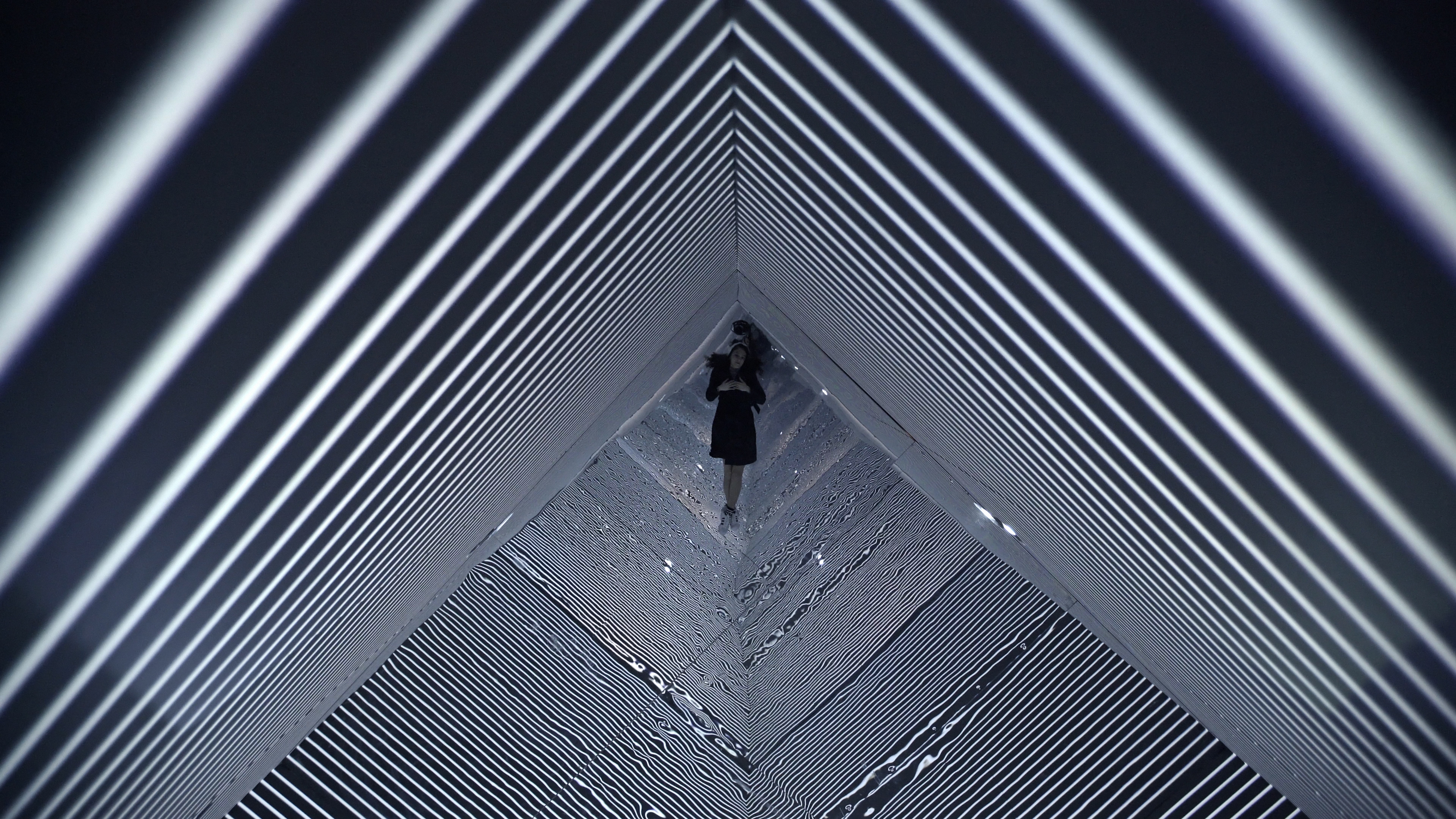
Infinity Room, 2015

He created "Infinity Room" at the Zorlu PSM for the 2015 Istanbul Biennial. Rather than creating an illusion only with mirrors, Anadol used pixel and 3D projection mapping to transform every surface of the room into an abstract infinite moving space. A temporary immersive environment, Infinity Room was also exhibited at events including South by Southwest in Austin, Texas, the New Zealand Festival in Wellington, New Zealand, and Jeffrey Deitch in Los Angeles.

In 2016, Anadol was awarded the first Google Artists and Machine Intelligence Artist Residency; it was just after a team at Google opened up the algorithm for DeepDream, a computer vision program that prompted Anadol's realization that if a machine could learn, it could remember, dream, and hallucinate.

=== 2017–2018: Winds of Boston, Archive Dreaming, Melting Memories, WDCH Dreams ===
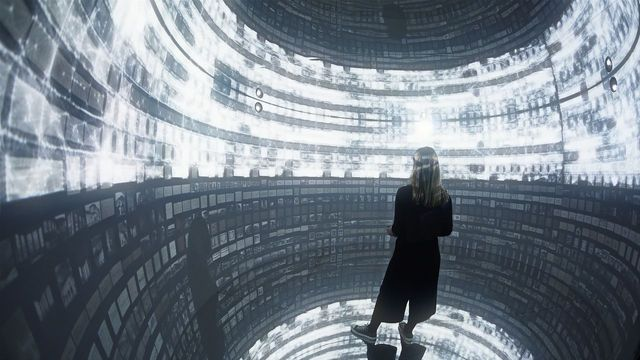
Archive Dreaming, 2017

In 2017, he created the data painting "Winds of Boston", a 6' x 13' foot video installation in the lobby of a Boston office building, using software he created to read, analyze and visualize wind speed, direction, and gust patterns along with time and temperature at 20-second intervals recorded over a one-year period at Logan International Airport. Later in the year, he used AI to generate infinite new outputs based on a massive dataset for "Archive Dreaming", an immersive installation at Salt Research, a contemporary gallery and library in Istanbul. Inspired by his idea of consciousness and its context within AI, as well as Jorge Luis Borges' The Library of Babel, Anadol used AI and machine learning to look at and discover interactions and correlations between 1.7 million items culled from 40,000 publications covering Turkish contemporary and modern art, architecture, and economics from 1997 to 2010. Archive Dreaming, which could be controlled by users with a joystick, dreamed of unexpected correlations among documents when idle.

In 2018, after his uncle was diagnosed with Alzheimer's, Anadol created "Melting Memories". Working with scientists from the neuroscape laboratory at the University of California, San Francisco, he used academic data from the neuroscience archives and EEG scans of an anonymous Alzheimer's disease dataset to create AI-generated visuals related to memory, health, degeneration, and decay.Melting Memories was projected on the walls of Pilevneli Gallery; visitors to the exhibition could watch as millions of pixels reconstructed people's memories. Anadol won the Lumen Prize Gold Award for Melting Memories.

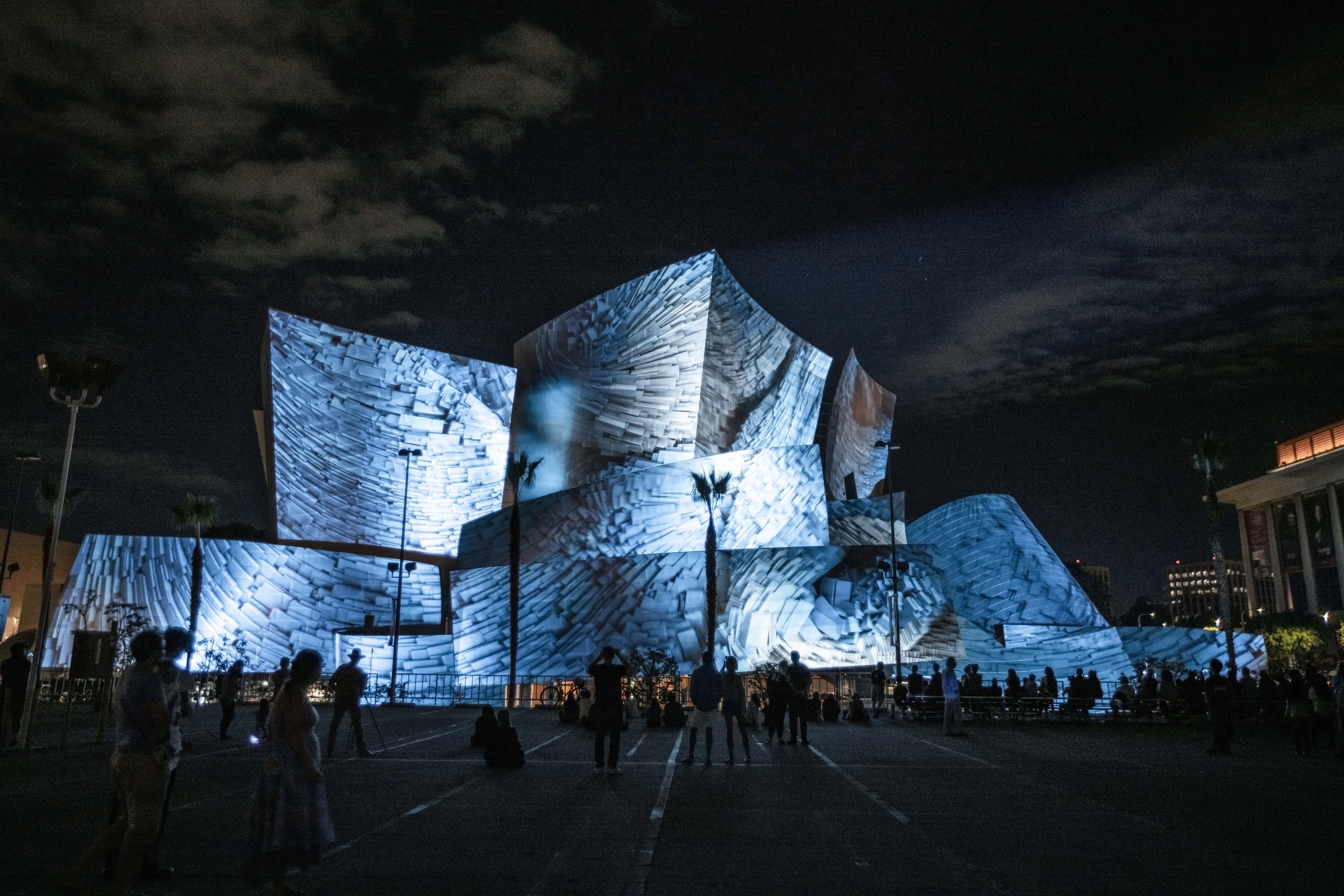
WDCH Dreams, 2018

Anadol was commissioned by the Los Angeles Philharmonic to create an installation to celebrate the orchestra's centennial anniversary in 2018. He worked with Google's Kenric MacDowell to create "WDCH Dreams", using algorithmic visualizations of data to mimic the process of human dreaming. Projected across the exterior walls of Walt Disney Concert Hall using 42 large-scale projectors with 50K visual resolution, 8-channel sound, and 1.2M luminance, Anadol painted with data points culled from the orchestra's archives, including 587,763 images, 1,880 videos, 1,483 metadata files, and 17,773 audio files. Because Gehry gave him access to the 3D architectural files of Walt Disney Concert Hall, Anadol knew the exact contours of the building.

WDCH Dreams debuted in September 2018. A 12-minute performance in three parts staged every 30 minutes over ten nights, "Centennial Memories,” the first piece, used 44.5 terabytes of historical data from the Phil's archives. It was followed by "Consciousness", which processed every note the orchestra has ever recorded, using billions of data points to generate connections; and "Dream," which merged "Centennial Memories" and "Consciousness" to create hallucinations that were described in The New York Times as "a sort of combinatorial Fantasia.

=== 2019–2021: Machine Hallucinations: NYC, Machine Hallucinations: Nature Dreams, Machine Memories: Space, Quantum Memories ===
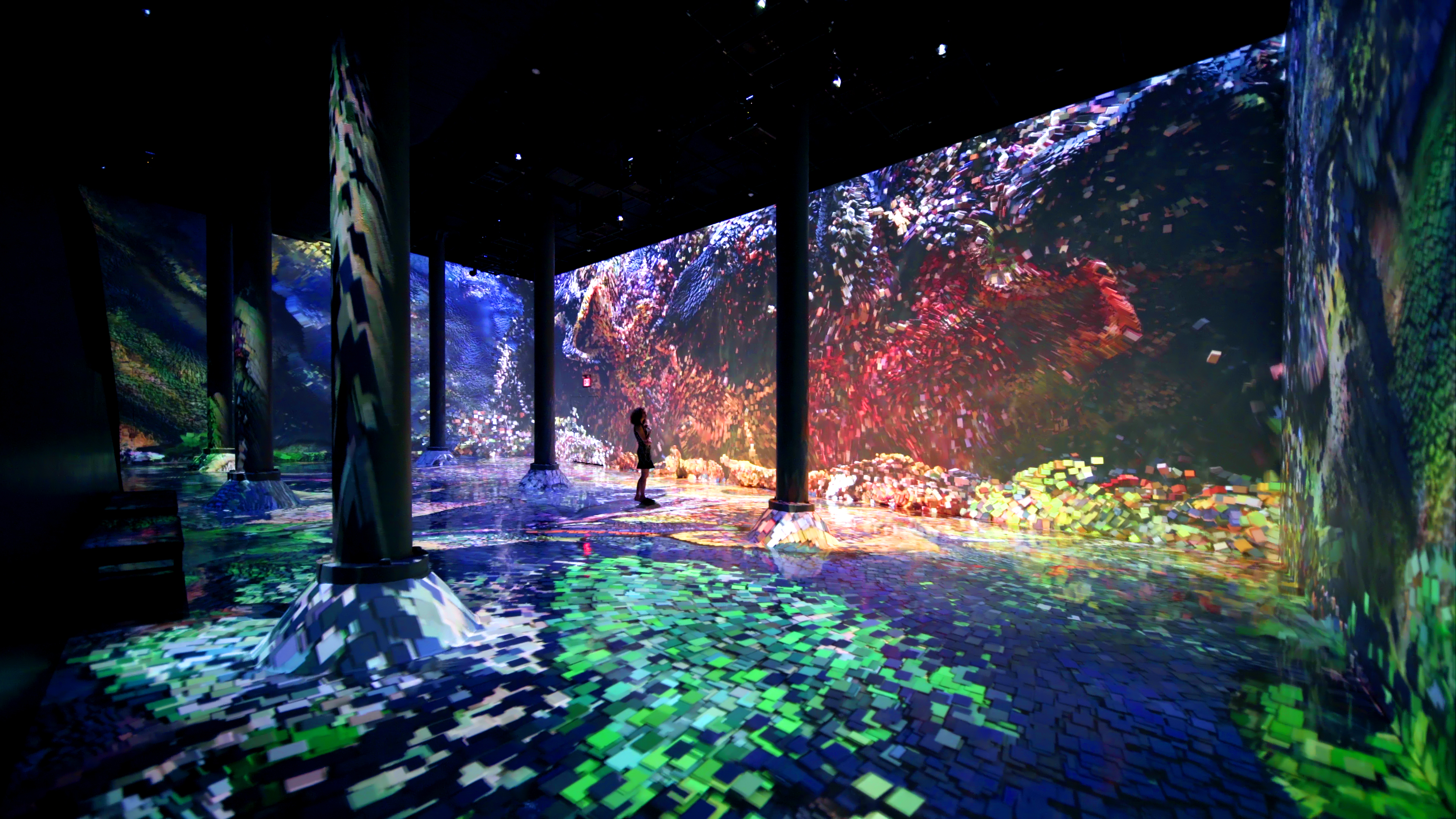
Machine Hallucinations, NYC 2019

In 2019, Refik Anadol presented "Latent History" at Fotografiska Stockholm. The site specific installation transformed photographic archives of Stockholm into a large scale, machine generated visual projection displayed in the museum’s main exhibition hall. Drawing on thousands of archival images spanning approximately 150 years, the work used artificial intelligence to reinterpret the city’s historical imagery as a continuously evolving visual narrative.

Anadol began thinking about the work that would become the Machine Hallucinations series while in residence at Google. In 2019, he completed the first work in the series, Machine Hallucinations: NYC, which used 300 million photos of New York City and 113 million additional data points, including subway sounds, radio snippets, and traffic noises. To address privacy concerns, the photos were publicly available through social media, search engines, digital maps, and library sites. Dreams were generated using a StyleGAN algorithm to retrieve and process images. A recurrent neural network absorbed and integrated audio. Machine Hallucinations: NYC inaugurated Artechouse, a 6000-square-foot gallery in New York City in September 2019. In a review of Machine Hallucinations: NYC in Art in America, Sophie Haigney wrote that that the piece mimicked the quality of human memory "almost perfectly."

2020's Quantum Memories was produced for the National Gallery of Victoria's Triennial exhibition. The work utilized Google AI's quantum computing software in combination with a supercomputer and open-source algorithms to 3D map a parallel world. Anadol won the IF Design Award for Quantum Memories in 2022.

The data sculpture Machine Hallucinations: Nature Dreams incorporated pigments, shapes, and patterns associated with nature culled from more than 300 million publicly accessible images of flowers, trees, mushrooms, landscapes, and clouds. Then the largest raw dataset of nature gathered for an artwork, Anadol worked with the Google AI Quantum team to merge AI-induced latent space with a quantum hyperspace to produce dreams that correlated technology, humanity, and culture. Nature Dreams was created for the Konig Gallery in Berlin and first exhibited in 2021; an excerpt from the work later served as the backdrop for the Grammy Awards. Machine Memoir: Space was also first exhibited in 2021; it was the most visited exhibition ever recorded in Istanbul.

Anadol became the first artist-in-residence at Casa Batlló in Barcelona in 2021. During his residency, he created In the Mind of Gaudi, a six-sided cube room It was one of a series of immersive rooms that Anadol created at Casa Batlló, a UNESCO World Heritage site.

=== 2022–2023: Living Architecture: Casa Batlló, Machine Hallucinations: Unsupervised and MoMA ===
A year after his residency, in May 2022, Anadol used the facade of Casa Batlló as a canvas for the 360-degree piece, "Living Architecture: Casa Batlló." Trained on real-time climate data collected by sensors placed around the building and a dataset of approximately one billion images consisting of Gaudí's sketches, visual archives of the building's history, academic archives, and publicly available photos, the piece drew an audience of 65,000 people.

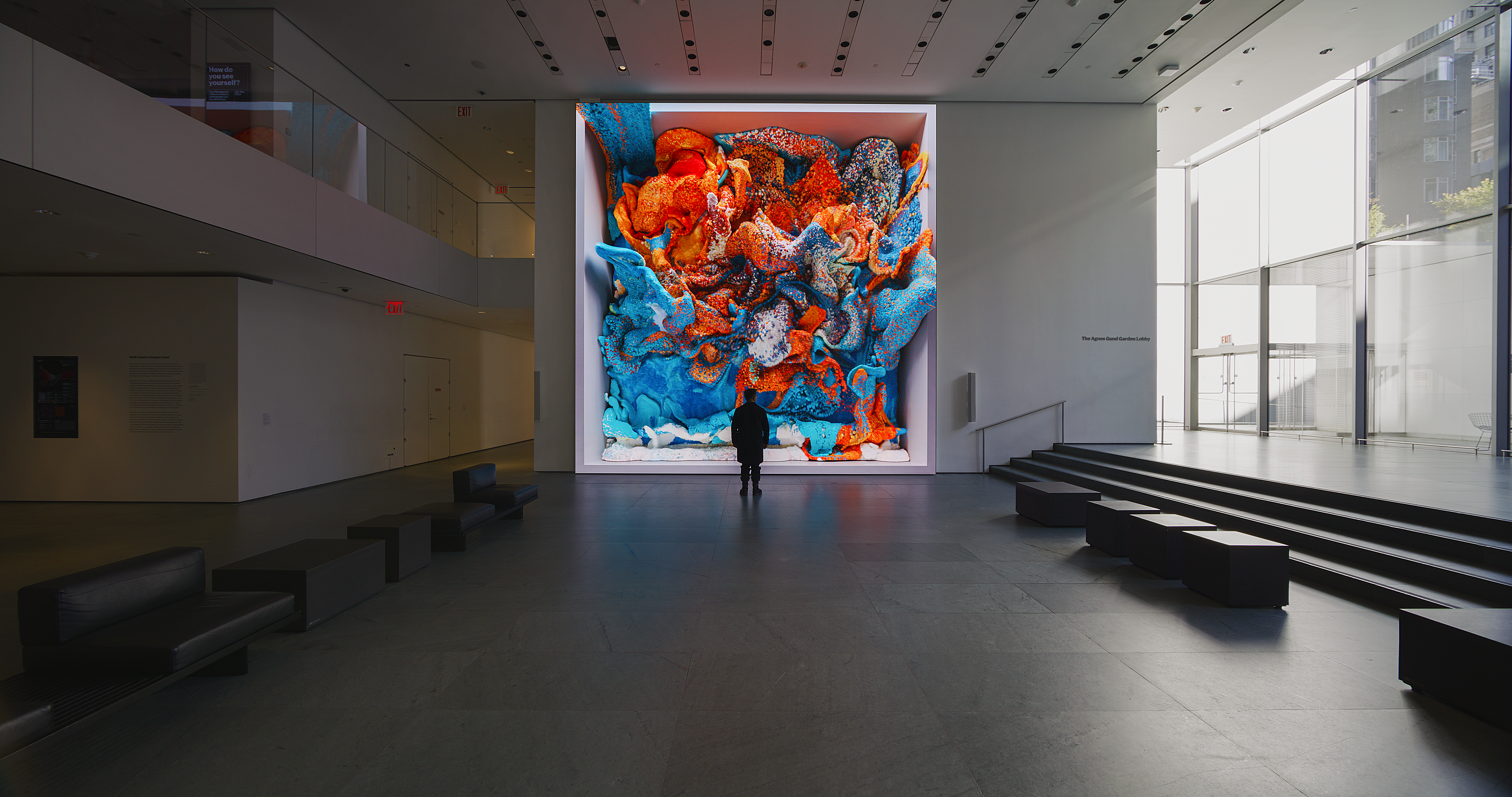
Unsupervised, MOMA, 2022

Machine Hallucinations: Unsupervised was among the first AI-generated artworks to be exhibited at MoMA. The exhibition opened in November 2022. "Pondering what a machine might dream about after seeing more than 200 years of art in MoMA’s collection," the exhibition opened in November 2022; it was extended four times and ultimately ran for almost a year. A 24' x 24' data sculpture, Unsupervised was acquired by MoMA in October 2023, becoming the first generative artwork in the museum's permanent collection.

Unsupervised utilized 138,151 freely available records MoMA uploaded to GitHub in 2016. The records, which represented all of the work in the museum's permanent collection, contained basic metadata: title, maker, medium, dimensions, date made, and date acquired. It also included categorization, which required a human perspective. Anadol was interested in what would happen without categorization, stating that without categories, Unsupervised could find a new form. A custom machine learning algorithm, created a map of MoMA's collection that existed in 1024 dimensions. Installed in the main atrium of the museum, visitors spent an average of 38 minutes viewing Unsupervised.

=== 2023–2024: Living Paintings at Jeffrey Deitch Gallery, Sphere, LNM and Living Archive ===
Anadol's first major solo exhibition in the United States, "Living Paintings", opened at the Jeffrey Deitch in Los Angeles in February 2023. Focused on California, the work utilized environmental data including wind forecasts over the Pacific Ocean, real-time weather, and images of California's national parks. In a review of Living Paintings in the Los Angeles Times, Deborah Vankin wrote: "For a show that's heavily tech-driven, the exhibition feels counterintuitively organic, collectively depicting AI reinterpretations of California's natural environments."

Anadol was commissioned to create a data sculpture for the September 2023 opening of the 366-foot-tall, globe-shaped Sphere, a venue in Las Vegas. The exterior of the building, a 580,000-square-foot programmable LED screen, became the canvas for "Machine Hallucinations: Sphere". Two versions of the piece appeared in succession; the first used 1.1 million publicly available images taken from the International Space Station, NASA’s Hubble Space Telescope, and other satellites and spacecraft. The second used 300 million publicly sourced images from national parks and weather-related data gathered from wind sensors in Las Vegas. Nvidia A100 supercomputers were used to produce real-time AI animations. A four-month installation, it was the largest AI artwork in the world when it was created. Anadol referred to the premiere of Machine Hallucinations: Sphere as "one of the most Blade Runner moments ever."

In January 2024, Anadol introduced 'Large Nature Model (LNM), a generative AI model exclusively dedicated to nature, at the World Economic Forum in Davos, where he unveiled an LNM output, "Living Archive: Nature." It was trained on images, sounds, and academic research from institutions including the Natural History Museum in London and the Smithsonian Institution. An iteration of LNM that generated rainforests and underwater landscapes, Echoes of the Earth: Living Archive, opened at the Serpentine Galleries in London later in January. The work drew from 135 million publicly available coral images and openly available data. More than 66,000 people viewed the work in 47 days. Echoes of the Earth: Living Archive, opened Futura Seoul, an art space in Bukchon Hanok Gahoe-dong, becoming Anadol's first solo exhibition in Asia.

=== 2025-present: A Goal in Life with Leo Messi ===
In 2025, Anadol collaborated with footballer Leo Messi on a digital art project titled Living Memory: Messi, A Goal in Life. The work transforms Messi’s favorite goal, a header from the 2009 UEFA Champions League Final against Manchester United, into an AI-generated data sculpture. It was unveiled on June 11, 2025, and sold for $1.87 million at Christie's. All the proceeds from the sale went to supporting educational initiatives in Latin America through the Inter Miami CF Foundation and UNICEF. The sale concluded on July 22nd, 2025.

== Blockchain and NFTs ==
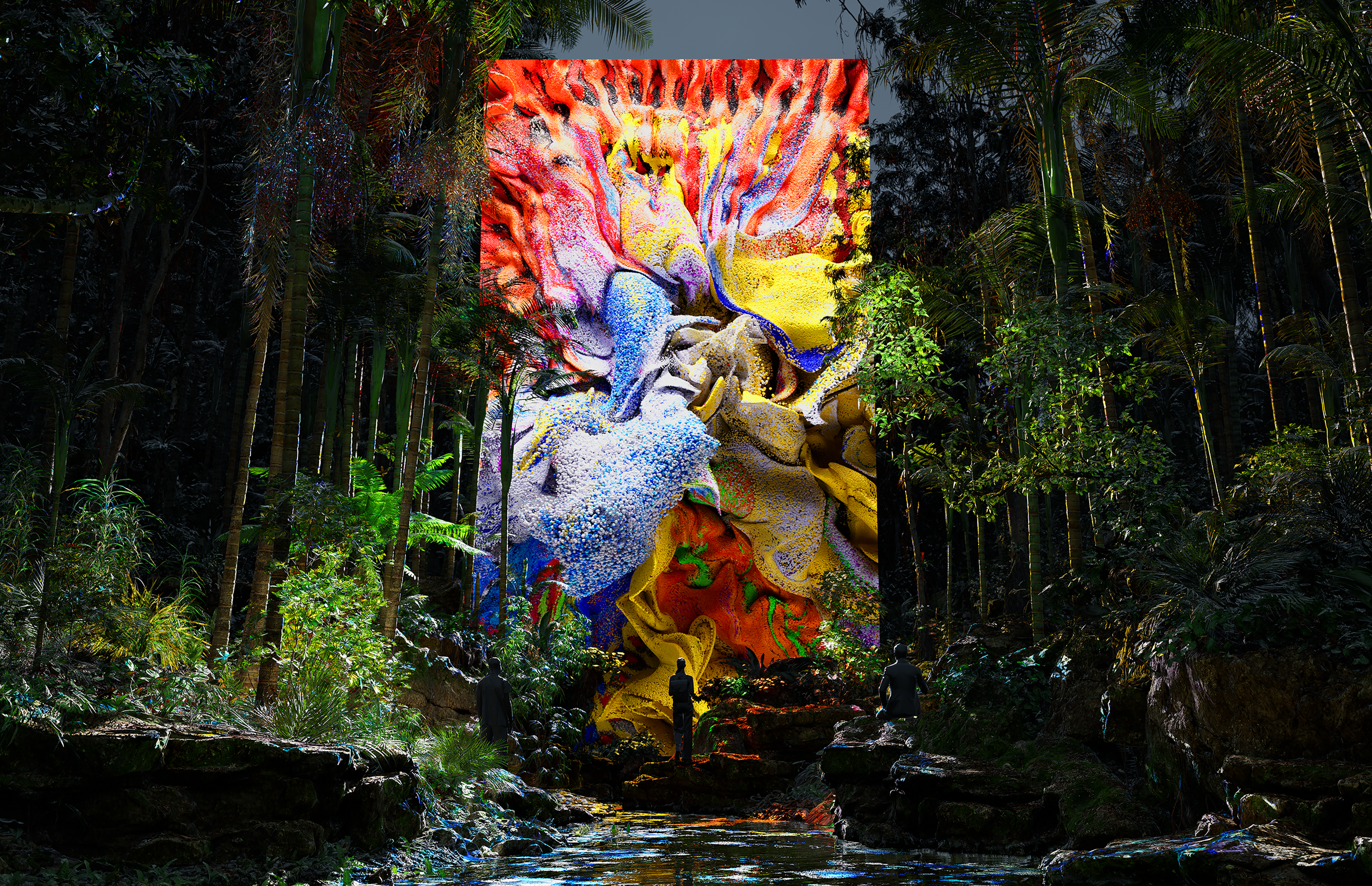
Winds of Yawanawa, 2024

Introduced to the idea of NFTs by a private collector in 2018, Anadol's first NFT was released during the 2020 COVID-19 lockdown. Since then, Refik Anadol Studio has released more than a dozen collections and 11000 tokens, including 2021's "Machine Hallucinations—Nature Dreams," "Machine Hallucinations—Space: Metaverse", an eight-work NFT collection consisting of an immersive physical experience, infinitely generative data paintings, and a robotically-produced AI data sculpture. Based on a collaboration with NASA JPL that began in early 2018, the collection sold for a record-setting $5 million at auction at Sotheby's in Hong Kong. Living Architecture: Casa Batlló sold for $1.38 million at auction at Christie's.

"Winds of Yawanawa", which merged weather data gathered from the Yawanawa village in the Amazon rainforest with the work of young Yawanawa artists, raised $3 million for the Yawanawa people. "An Important Memory for Humanity" raised $1.5 million for St. Jude Children's Research Hospital. Approximately $10 million has been raised through the sale of NFTs for additional organizations, including the Alzheimer's Foundation of America, and UNICEF.

== Refik Anadol Studio ==
In 2014, Anadol and Efsun Erkılıç founded Refik Anadol Studio. Initially focused on the production of public art, the studio has expanded to become a multidisciplinary collective of artists, architects, data scientists, and researchers who work in collaboration with computational designers, neuroscientists, philosophers, biologists, medical doctors, composers, and environmental scientists. The studio is housed in a 1960s warehouse in the Frogtown neighborhood of Los Angeles.

== Dataland ==
The opening of Dataland, a 20,000-square foot museum dedicatred to AI art. Founded by Anadol and Erkılıç, Dataland is located at the The Grand LA, a Gehry-designed $1 billion development adjacent to Walt Disney Concert Hall. Anadol and Erkılıç collaborated with Google to power the museum's AI tools through a sustainable energy park in Oregon. It opened on June 20, 2026.

== Awards and recognition ==
Anadol has received awards and prizes including the Time 100 Impact Award, the Lumen Prize Gold Award, UCLA's 2024 Edward A. Dickinson Alumnus of the Year Award, the Lorenzo il Magnifico Lifetime Achievement Award for New Media Art, Microsoft Research Best Vision Award, iF Gold Award,D&AD Pencil Award, German Design Award, UCLA Art+Architecture Moss Award, Columbia University's Breakthrough in Storytelling Award, University of California Institute for Research in the Arts Award, SEGD Global Design Award, LOOP Design Award and Google's Artists and Machine Intelligence Artist Residency Award. He presented TED talks in August 2020 (“Art in the Age of Machine Intelligence”) and in August 2023 (“How AI Could Enhance Humanity’s Collective Memory”); and delivered the keynote speech "Generative AI: Shaping The Future" at MIT in December 2023. He presented at the World Economic Forum, NVDIA GTC, and the United Nations Summit of the Future, among other conferences and events.
