= Dataland =

AI Museum in Los Angeles, US

- Established: June 20, 2026
- Location: The Grand LA; 100 S Grand Ave. Los Angeles, CA 90012,
- Type: Generative images
- Website: https://dataland.art/

Dataland is a museum of AI images located at The Grand LA in downtown Los Angeles. The first museum of AI images, it opened on June 20, 2026. The museum was founded by media creator Refik Anadol and Efsun Erkılıç.

Dataland's inaugural exhibition, Machine Dreams: Rainforest, uses Refik Anadol Studio's Large Nature Model (LNM), an open-source generative AI model trained on more than 500 million nature images and over 50,000 audio recordings, including birdsongs and rain.

Dataland was designed in collaboration with architecture firm Gensler and with consultancy Arup. It spans 25,000 square feet.
