= Arthur J. Will Memorial Fountain =

Fountain in Los Angeles, California, U.S.

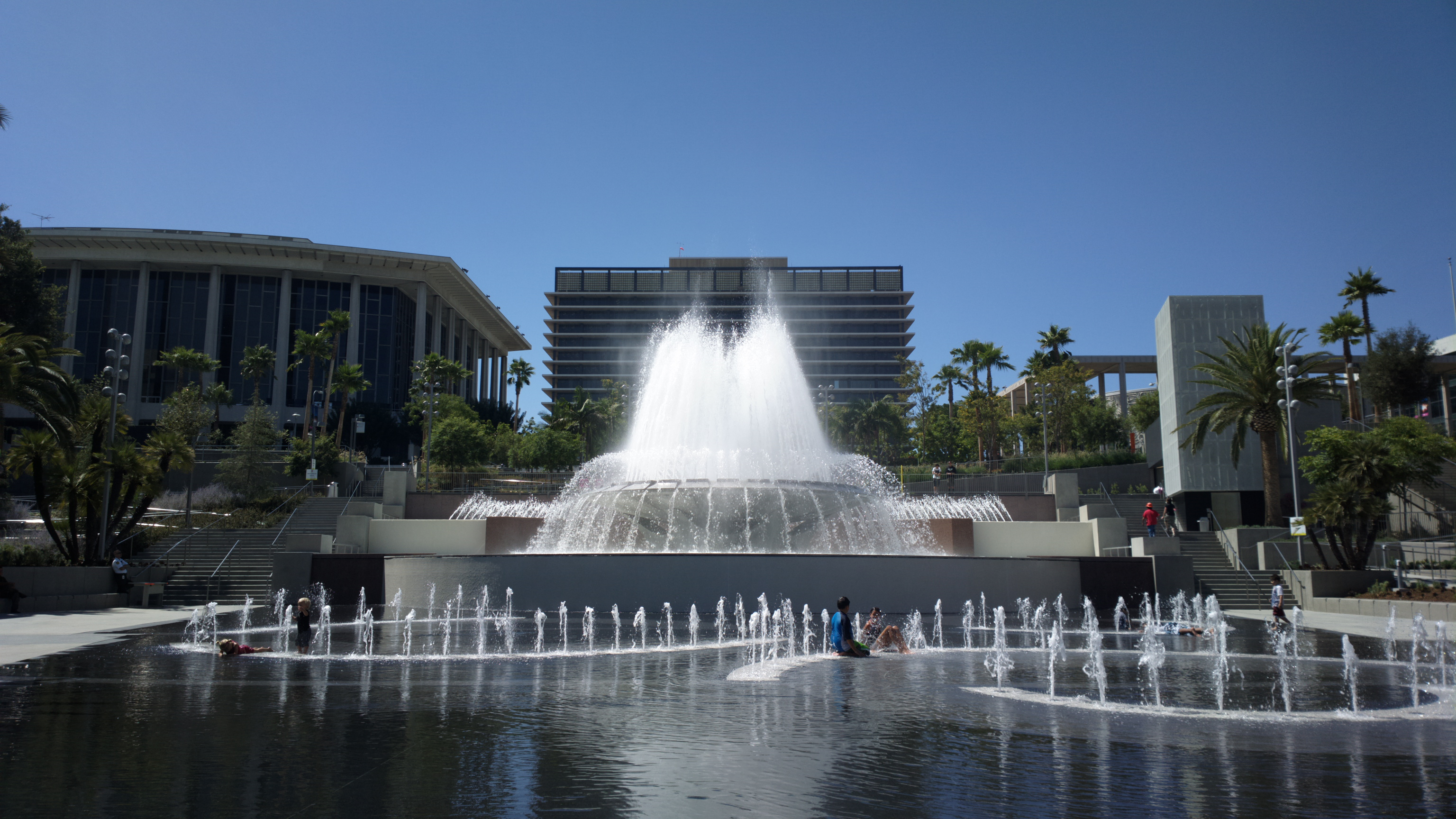
- The fountain in 2012
- Location: Los Angeles, California, U.S.; 34°3′23.5″N 118°14′49.8″W

The Arthur J. Will Memorial Fountain is located in Los Angeles' Grand Park, in the U.S. state of California.

The fountain was renovated during the 2010s.
