= Lindbergh Beacon =

Aircraft beacon on Los Angeles City Hall

Coordinates: 34.05370°N 118.24279°W

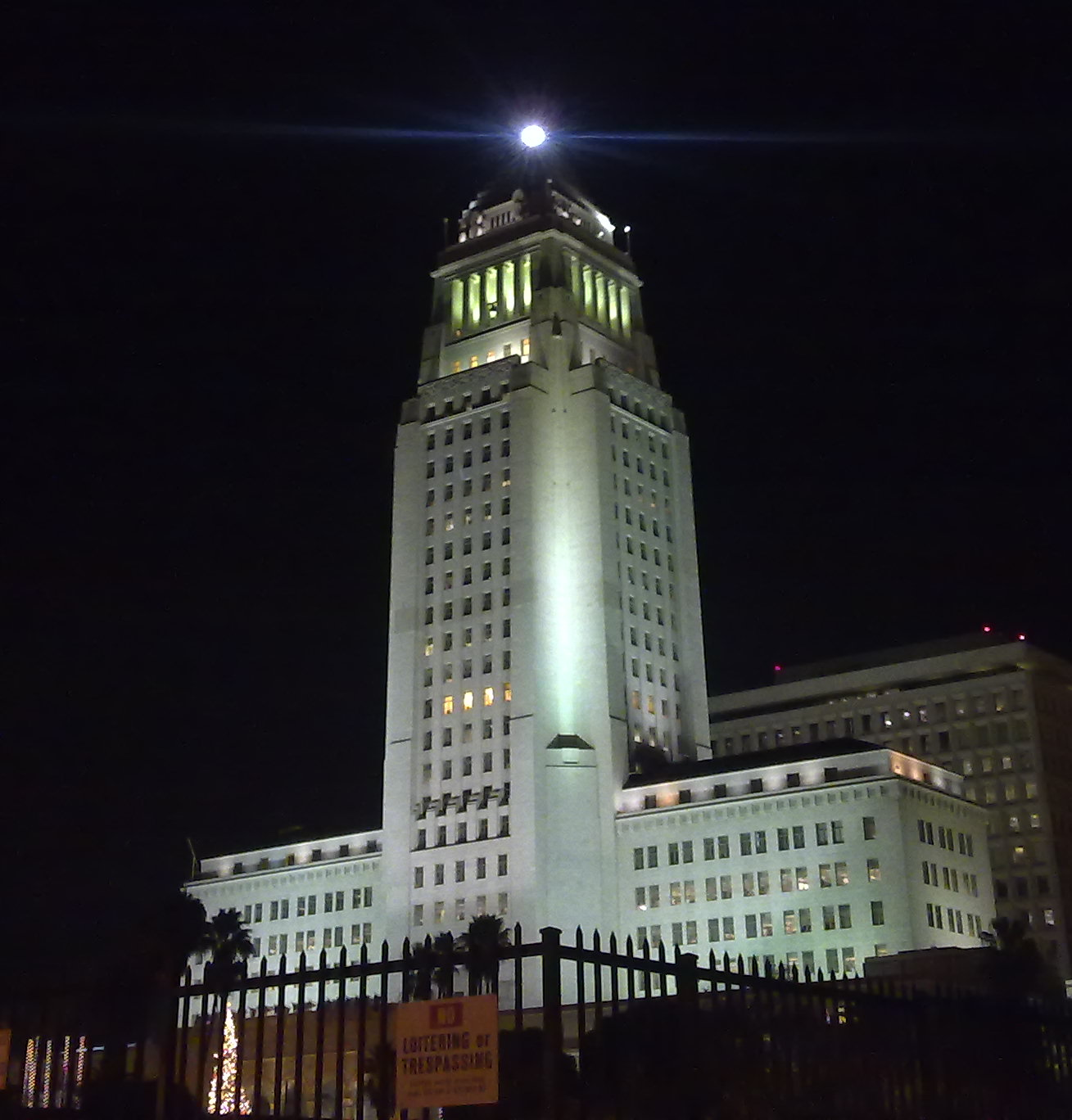
Los Angeles City Hall and active Lindbergh Beacon in 2005

The Lindbergh Beacon is an aircraft beacon atop the Los Angeles City Hall, operated nightly from April 26, 1928, until just after the attack on Pearl Harbor. It was restored to its original condition in 2001, and Los Angeles magazine described it as "a tiara of light atop our beautifully restored Los Angeles City Hall." City officials now occasionally put the beacon into operation for special occasions such as the year-end holidays.

== History ==
In an article of September 1, 1927, during construction of the hall and less than four months after the historic solo trans-Atlantic flight of Col. Charles Lindbergh, the Los Angeles Times marked the beginning of the Lindbergh Beacon project with:

In recommending the installation of a great beacon light at the summit of the new City Hall tower—as a tribute to Col. Lindbergh—the board of directors and air transportation committee of our Chamber of Commerce have hit upon a striking and practical device for honoring the nation's flying hero in a way that beyond a doubt.

The beacon began operation on the first night of the City Hall's three-day dedication gala of April 26–28, 1928. In two articles during April 1928, the Los Angeles Times indicated that:

People in Los Angeles and vicinity are going to have an opportunity next Thursday to see what a light of 8,000,000 candlepower looks like lensed down [sic, actually a mirror] into one brilliant beam. The Lindbergh Beacon on top of the new City Hall tower will be flashed on by President Coolidge ... by pressing a telegraph instrument in the White House.

The Times recounted that:

For thirty minutes the building was kept dark as the beaming beacon turned silently on its pivot and cast the message of Los Angeles' civic progress and development as an aviation center in a circle 120 miles [190 km] in diameter.

Only six months after the Lindbergh Beacon began operations an associate of Lindbergh was quoted, indirectly, as saying that the beacon was "a great mistake" and that rotating beacons should only be used near airports.

In May 1931, by order of the Department of Commerce, the rotating white beacon was replaced with a directional red beacon pointing to the nearest airport. Immediately after the attack on Pearl Harbor the City Hall's beacon was turned off and continued dormant until after the war. It was briefly reactivated in 1947 and then removed and put in storage.

Beginning in 1992 the red Lindbergh Beacon was put on display at the Tom Bradley International Terminal at Los Angeles International Airport, LAX.

Beginning in the late 1990s, the beacon was restored and reinstalled as part of the City Hall's $299 million renovation and seismic upgrade. In September 2001, with the building work compete, it was planned to relight the beacon but the September 11 attacks on New York and Washington delayed the reactivation until later in the year. During December 2001, the Lindbergh Beacon's white beam again swept across the city.

== Early aids to navigation ==
Between 1923 and 1933, as an aid to aerial navigation, the US Post Office and the Department of Commerce constructed a nationwide network of airway beacons. These beacons provided a rotating white light which appeared to flash one tenth second every ten seconds. Just below the white beacon a set of red or green course lights pointed along each airway route.

The original white Lindbergh Beacon rotated six times each minute like the white beacons of the federal network. As restored, the white Lindbergh Beacon rotates at ten times per minute. The characteristics of the second red beacon atop the City Hall may or may not have matched the characteristics of the national network's red course lights.

== Commemorative plaque ==
Los Angeles City Hall's 27th floor observation deck has a bronze commemorative plaque titled "The Lindbergh Beacon" that reads as follows:

The beacon on top of the Los Angeles City Hall was turned on by President Calvin Coolidge from the White House during the City Hall dedication ceremonies April 26, 1928. The light was gratefully dedicated to Charles A. Lindbergh for his contribution to the advancement of aviation and in commemoration of man's first transatlantic solo flight from New York to Paris on May 20, 1927. Press Photographers Association of Greater Los Angeles.

The plaque must have been put in place after this professional group was founded in 1936.

== Huell Howser's television programs ==
During the period 1992–2001, the television personality Huell Howser broadcast, on PBS, three programs related to the history of the Lindbergh Beacon. Each successive program built on the previous programs.

== Chronology ==
- March 1926: Ground breaking at the $5,000,000 Los Angeles City Hall.
- June 1927: "Plans for a gigantic 192-foot [59 m] monument, to serve also as a beacon light for aviators at Clover Field, Santa Monica, have been launched ... to commemorate ... the first aerial circumnavigation."
- August–September 1927: LA Times mentions civic leaders' interest in providing a beacon atop City Hall to honor Lindbergh and create an aid to aerial navigation.
- September 1927: Lindbergh visits Los Angeles as part of his nationwide tour.
- Early April 1928: "'The City Hall tower and the Lindbergh beacon will tell flying tourists during the coming century of their arrival in Los Angeles,' was the prophecy made yesterday by Mayor Cryer while flying at the altitude of 8,000 feet [2,400 m] directly over the new City Hall. ... "
- April 26–28, 1928: Dedication ceremony including the remote activation of the Lindbergh Beacon by President. Coolidge.
- October 1928: Indirect quote by Santa Monicans degrading the LA City Hall's beacon. "Maj. Thomas G. Lanphier, co-director with Col. Charles A. Lindbergh of the Transcontinental Air Transport Company, disapproves the placing of revolving beacon lights anywhere but near airport landings, according to Clover Field aviators who . ... "
- April 1931: "Within a month a red light will [direct its beam] from the top of the City Hall tower [to the nearest airport], it was learned from Public Works Commissioner Elkins yesterday. It will take the place of the present white beam known as the Lindbergh Beacon." This change was mandated by the US Department of Commerce.
- December 9, 1941: LA Times reports that the Lindbergh Beacon has been turned off.
- 1991 Huell Howser's program on the beacon rekindles interest in its restoration.
- 1992–2001: Beacon, with red filter, on display at the Tom Bradley Terminal at LAX.
- 2001: "White" beacon reinstalled atop the LA City Hall, and, later in the year, reactivated for several weeks.
