= International Savings & Exchange Bank Building =

Former building in Downtown Los Angeles

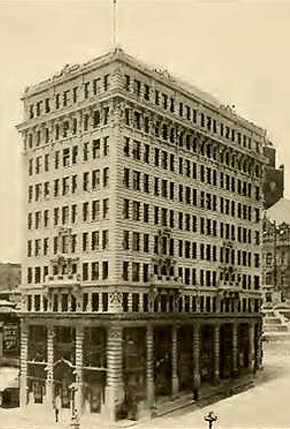
- The International Savings & Exchange Bank Building, which stood at the SW corner of Temple & Spring in downtown Los Angeles
- Interactive map of the International Savings & Exchange Bank Building area

General information
- Architectural style: Renaissance Revival/Italianate
- Location: 226 North Spring Street, Los Angeles, California, United States
- Coordinates: 34.0542°N 118.2433°W
- Construction started: 1906
- Completed: 1907
- Demolished: 1954–5
- Client: International Savings & Exchange Bank, Inc.

Technical details
- Structural system: steel frame
- Floor count: 10

Design and construction
- Architect: H. Alban Reaves

The International Savings & Exchange Bank Building (also known as the International Savings Building) was built in the Spring Street Financial District of Los Angeles in 1907. Standing ten floors, it was designed in the Renaissance Revival and Italianate styles by architect H. Alban Reaves (some sources spell Reeves), who had previously designed several structures in New York, including what is now the south building of the historic Schuyler Arms.

== History ==
The building stood at 223–229 North Spring Street, the southwest corner of Temple and Spring across Temple from the Main Post Office, and was featured in several postcards from the 1920s. Occupying the ground floor was the International Savings & Exchange Bank, “an institution much in favor among foreign born and descended residents,” which had been incorporated four years earlier in 1903. In later years, it served as the City Health Building.

In 1928, the building was dwarfed by the new 30-story Los Angeles City Hall. The building was purchased by the city to be razed to complete landscaping for city hall. However, the City Health department found a home in the building for the next twenty-five years. It was not demolished until December 1954, when new City Health offices were built. The portion of Spring Street that its front entrance faced no longer exists.

== Role in Safety Last! ==
This building is one of three that was featured in the 1923 Harold Lloyd film, Safety Last!. The ten-floor International Savings Building is presented in the film as “the 12-story Bolton Building” and is the setting for the story’s “DeVore Department Store.” The interior store scenes at ground level were not filmed at the International Savings Bank Building but at Ville de Paris, a department store at 712 South Olive at 7th Street.

For several years it has been incorrectly reported that the building shown in both the film and photo stills was the 12-story Beaux Arts-styled Brockman building, designed by St. Louis architects Barnett, Haynes & Barnett in 1911 (some sources say 1921) and still standing today at 530 West Seventh Street at Grand Avenue. Only the roof of the Brockman Building was used for Safety Last!, but the Brockman itself is not seen in the movie. Although the two buildings look nothing alike, this erroneous understanding has appeared in numerous sources, including The Los Angeles Times, Daily Variety, Los Angeles Business Journal, and countless real estate websites.

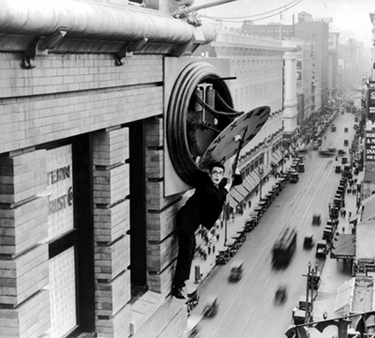
Replica of the International Savings Building’s façade as seen in Safety Last!

The International Savings Building was used for all of the long shots showing Lloyd’s character scaling its exterior. Medium and close shots were executed using a full-scale replica of two floors of the International Savings Building’s façade, placed on a platform on the rooftop of the L. L. Burns Western Costume Co. building at 908 S. Broadway – making it appear that Lloyd’s character was hanging up to 12 stories over the sidewalk. (A similar method was used for 1921’s Terror Trail, wherein a building façade was reconstructed over the Hill Street Tunnel to give an illusion of grand height on film – while actually being only a story and a half above a solid surface.)

The International Savings Building is seen clearly in a large photograph (showing a stuntman climbing it for Safety Last!) on page 140 of the book, Hollywood – The Pioneers by Kevin Brownlow (Alfred A. Knopf, New York, 1979).

== See also ==
- Continental Building, Los Angeles' first high-rise building, built in 1903 and using the same architectural styles
- Los Angeles City Hall
