= Grand Avenue Project =

Urban revitalization in Los Angeles, CA

The Grand LA
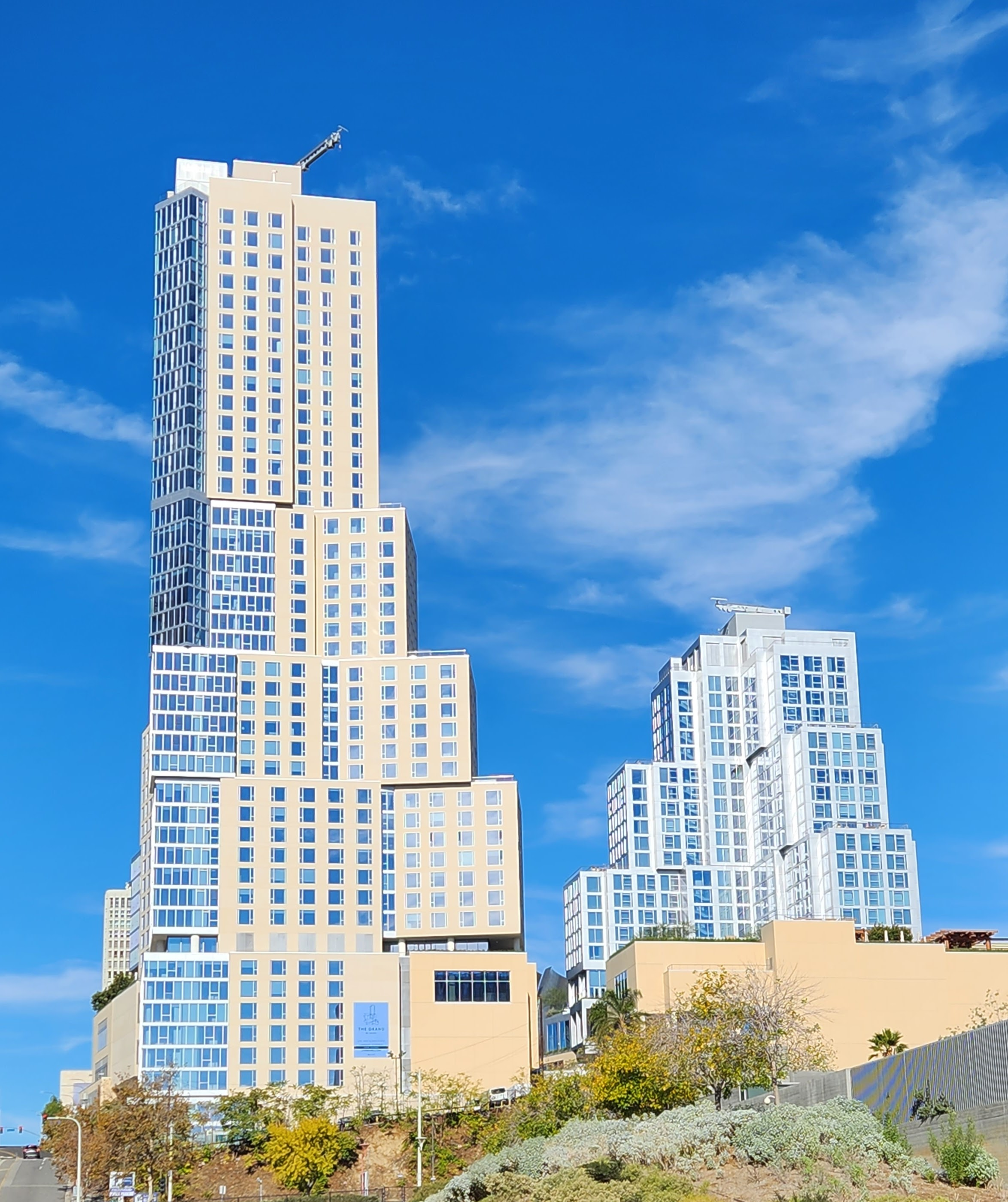

General information
- Architectural style: Deconstructivism
- Construction started: 2019
- Completed: 2022

Height
- Height: 511 ft (156 m)

Technical details
- Floor count: 43

Design and construction
- Architect: Frank Gehry

The Grand Avenue Project was a government lead revitalization effort for the Bunker Hill neighborhood of Downtown Los Angeles on Grand Avenue and centered around Grand Park, its surrounding county government buildings and its parking lots. It was administered by the Grand Avenue Authority, a joint powers authority consisting of Los Angeles County and City. The first task was to improve the streetscape of Grand Avenue. The second element was to upgrade the 12-acre (4.9 ha) Grand Park in 2012 with a refurbished fountains, lawn furniture, walkways and the planting of native gardens. The final phase of the project, The Grand LA, consisted of several residential buildings, including a two-tower complex on the southeast corner of Grand Avenue and 1st Street, designed by Frank Gehry.

== History ==
On February 14, 2007, both the Los Angeles City Council and the Los Angeles County Board of Supervisors approved the project, and officials originally hoped to break ground in December 2007. The project has been developed in stages due to the recession between 2007 and 2009. On July 26, 2012, Grand Park opened to the public as the initial phase of the project, In October 2014, The Related Companies completed The Emerson, a 19-story tower marketed to older adults that includes an affordable housing component. The Broad, a contemporary art museum, opened between the Disney Concert Hall and the condo tower in 2015. The final phase of the project, on a lot directly east of the Disney Concert Hall, has two skyscrapers, a 45-story residential tower and a 25-story tower featuring apartments and the Conrad Hotel. The development was designed by Frank Gehry. Construction began in December 2018 and completed in 2022.

== Design ==
Grand Park is 16-acre (6.5 ha), stretching between the development's two boundaries: City Hall and the Department of Water and Power building. The park was designed to be pedestrian friendly and connects Bunker Hill to the Civic Center. The park includes tree-shaded sidewalks, fountains, plenty of street lights, benches, and kiosks to encourage walking and exploration of the area, which was designed to encourage residents and visitors to enjoy a family-friendly green space in downtown Los Angeles with musical events and other park activities. The project also included a redevelopment of the Music Center Plaza, the Broad Museum designed by Diller Scofidio + Renfro, and a redevelopment and refurbishment of the Los Angeles Music Center plaza. Two towers were built across from the Disney Concert Hall, designed by architect Frank Gehry as part of the Grand LA. The towers have since been named The Grand by Gehry residences and the Conrad Los Angeles hotel.

== See also ==
- List of works by Frank Gehry
