= Grand Park =

Park in Los Angeles, California

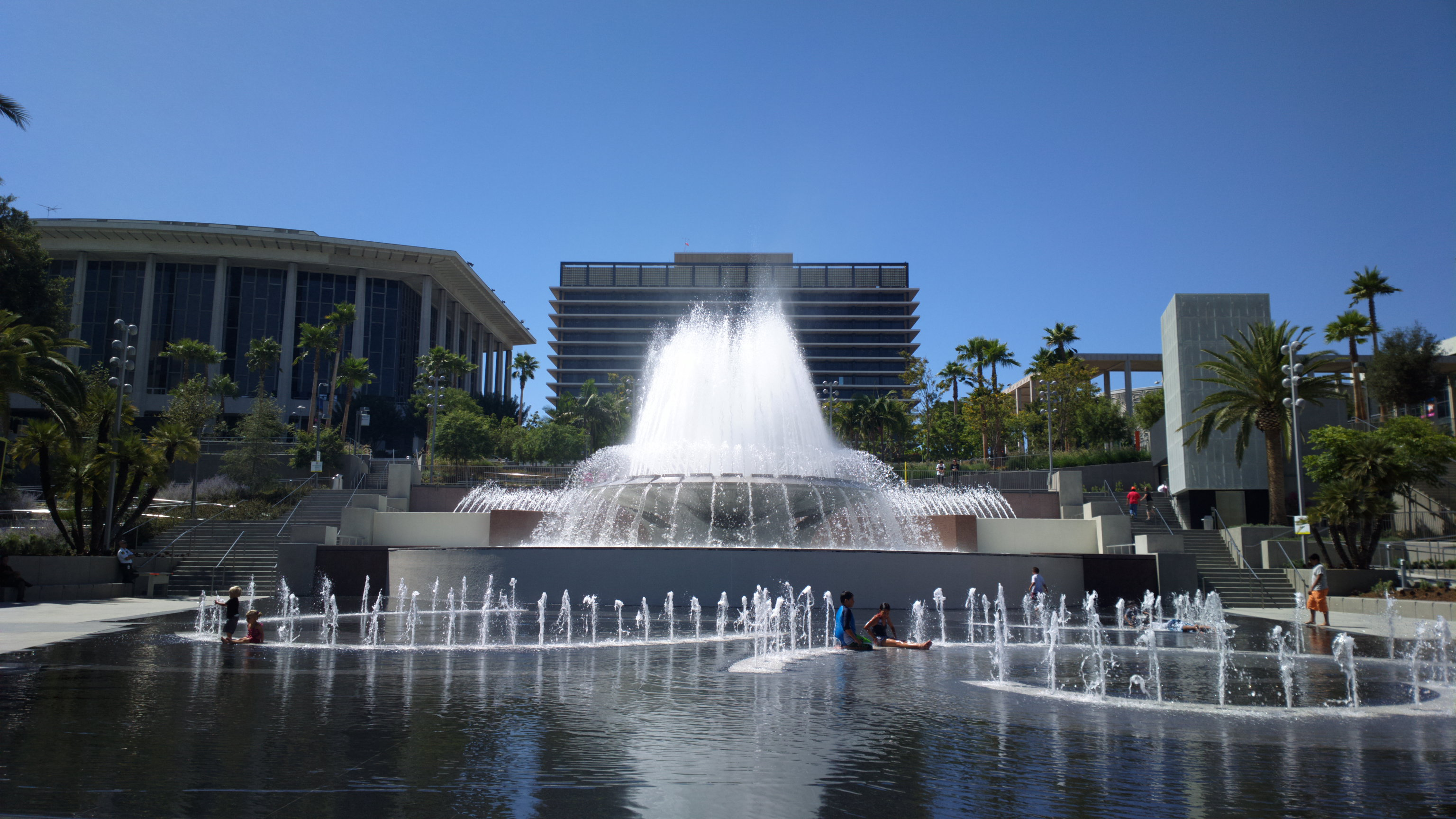
- Interactive map of Grand Park
- Type: Urban park
- Location: Civic Center, Los Angeles, California, United States
- Coordinates: 34°03′24″N 118°14′50″W
- Area: 12 acres (4.9 ha)
- Created: 2012
- Designer: RIOS
- Operator: Los Angeles Music Center
- Status: Open all year
- Public transit: B Line D Line

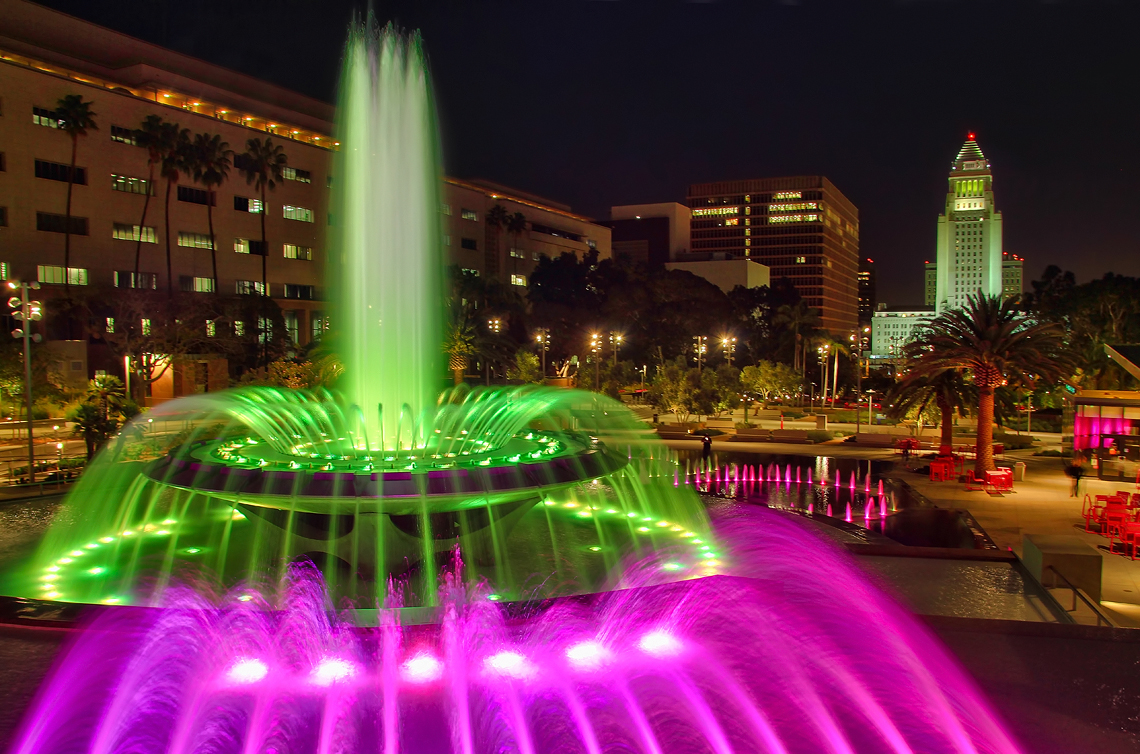
The Arthur J. Will Memorial Fountain and Los Angeles City Hall

Gloria Molina Grand Park, commonly known as Grand Park, is a 12-acre (4.9 ha) park located in the civic center of Los Angeles, California. First developed in 1966 as the Civic Center Mall with plazas, fountains and a Court of Flags, it is now a part of the larger redevelopment known as the Grand Avenue Project, with its first phase having opened in July 2012. Grand Park is part of a joint venture by the city of Los Angeles and Los Angeles County. It was designed and built by the Los Angeles–based multidisciplinary design firm Rios Clementi Hale Studios. Park programming and entertainment, security and upkeep are maintained by the nearby Los Angeles Music Center.

Grand Park stretches between the Los Angeles City Hall and the Los Angeles Music Center on Grand Avenue. It is designed to be pedestrian friendly and connects Bunker Hill to the civic center. The park plans include tree-shaded sidewalks, drought-tolerant plants, an interactive fountain plaza, performance lawns and courtyards, plenty of street lights, movable park furniture, and kiosks to encourage the walking and exploration of the area. City officials and some visitors have compared Grand Park to other well-established urban parks such as New York's Central Park or San Francisco's Union Square.

== History ==
First proposed as a park by landscape architect Charles Mulford Robinson in 1907 inspired by the City Beautiful movement, but was never developed. After years of proposing the clustering of Los Angeles County government buildings in one place, the county and city finally accomplished that goal with a centralized park in 1957. The park was completed as "Civic Center Mall" in 1966.

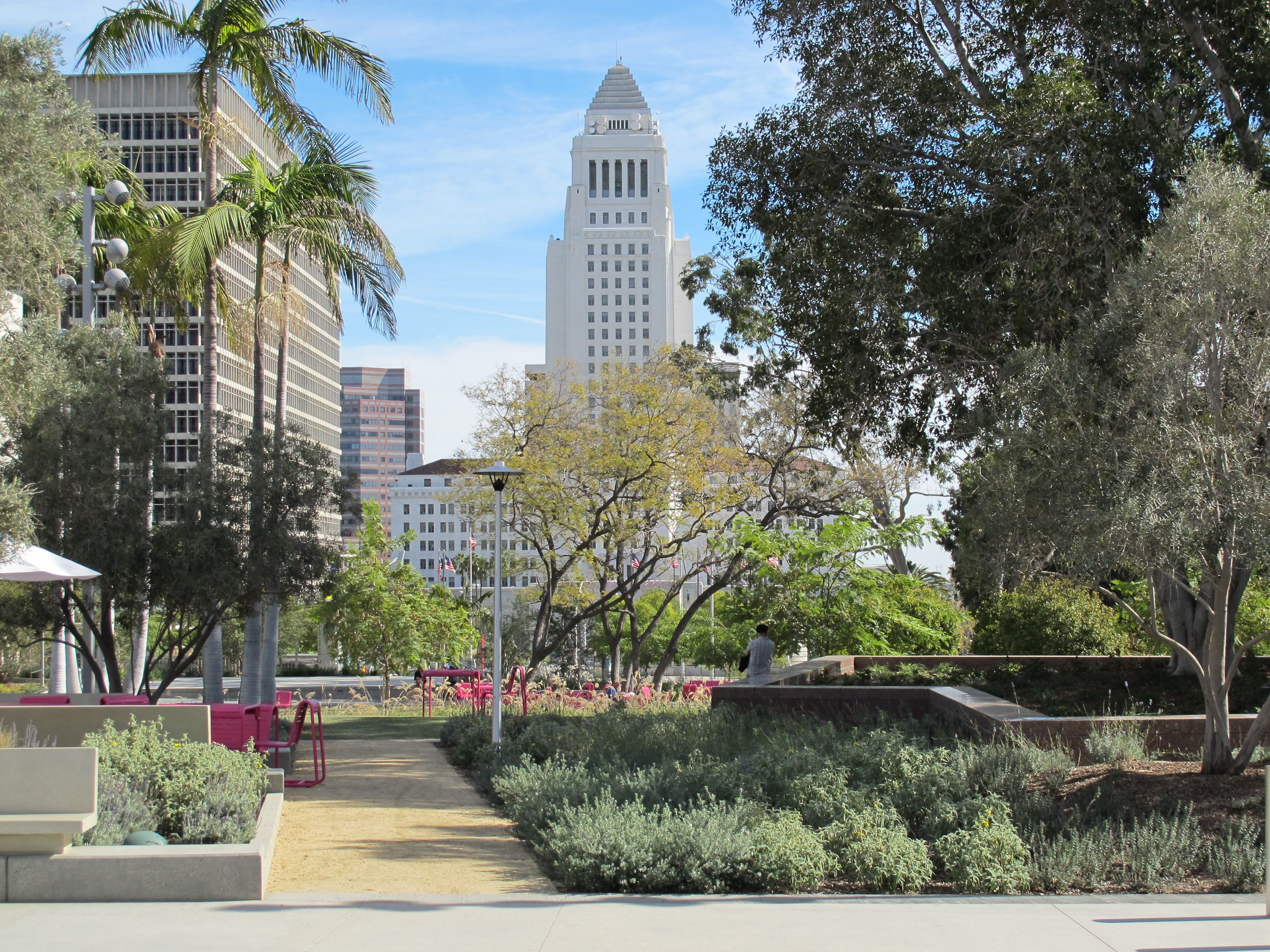
Grand Park features bright pink seating and mature trees.

Re-development of Grand Park began in 2010 at a cost of $56 million. $50 million provided by Related Companies, the developer planning the nearby Grand Avenue Project. The parks later phase includes a Frank Gehry-designed mixed-use development. Due to the Great Recession in the early 2010s, the development was pushed back, commencing construction in 2019. Other phases of the project remained stalled, but the park and grand avenue project moved forward thanks to a special agreement between the joint powers authority overseeing the project and its developer.

On March 21, 2023, supervisor Hilda Solis introduced a motion to rename Grand Park to Gloria Molina Grand Park, honoring supervisor Gloria Molina's contributions for the park's redevelopment after Molina's announcement of terminal cancer. It was approved unanimously by the Board of Supervisors the day it was introduced. A motion to endorse the renaming passing in the Los Angeles City Council, with Mayor Karen Bass also endorsing it.

== Management ==
The Los Angeles Music Center's contract to operate Grand Park is expected to run until mid-2017; in addition, it earns in rents and fees charged to concessionaires and others. Routine security is provided by the Music Center's security department, and law enforcement services by the Los Angeles County Sheriff's Department. In 2014, the Los Angeles County Board of Supervisors approved funding of $1 million for an independent nonprofit group, the Grand Park Foundation.

== Activities ==
By virtue of the mostly sunny weather, the park also features programs year-round. In 2012, the Los Angeles County Board of Supervisors allocated $3.3 million for the first year's operations, mainly to cover logistics such as security and maintenance, with $100,000 for programming. Events will be coordinated by the Performing Arts Center of Los Angeles County, which also oversees the Dorothy Chandler Pavilion, Ahmanson Theatre, Mark Taper Forum and the Walt Disney Concert Hall. The inaugural event featured Bandaloop, a professed vertical dance company of aerialists, performing against the backdrop of Los Angeles City Hall. During the first six months, Grand Park hosted about 40 events. Some were bids for a mass audience, while others aimed to grab passers-by.

The Community Terrace features a large picnic table and lawn area for gatherings and viewing visuals projected on nearby wall of the Hall of Records. Open lawn space can be used for major public events such as New Year's Eve celebrations and festivals. The park also hosted the Gloria Molina Grand Park's New Year Eve celebration every year.

== Transportation ==
Direct access to the park is available on the Los Angeles Metro B and D lines at Civic Center/Grand Park station. The park is also accessible via the J Line's 1st Street/Hill Street stop, or its Spring Street/City Hall stop. Several local, rapid and express Metro bus routes also share the same 1st Street/Hill Street stop at the civic center.

== Significant events ==
The park is host to Los Angeles' first free major public New Year's Eve celebration, shortened to "N.Y.E.L.A.". The first edition was held December 31, 2013 – January 1, 2014. The first event, which included food trucks, art installations, light shows, concert stages, drew an estimated 25,000 spectators.

Every year since, at 11:55 pm, a light projection show is displayed onto the side of Los Angeles City Hall and other municipal buildings, displaying visual art before ultimately counting down to midnight with the crowd. The art is in collaboration with The LA Music Center. It is intended to become an annual celebration, with the hope that it would rival other major cities' festivities in years to come. So much so they added fireworks in 2015–16 celebration. By the sixth annual (2018–19) event, Grand Park + The Music Center's N.Y.E.L.A. drew over 50,000 guests. Doubling its inaugural event attendance. Aloe Blacc was the featured artist in 2018–19.

On August 30–31, 2014, Jay Z's Labor Day Made in America Festival was held in Grand Park featuring, Imagine Dragons, John Mayer, Kanye West, and many other performers.

An Armenian genocide memorial opened in September 2016.

The music video for "Play That Song" by Train was partly filmed in front of the Arthur J. Will Memorial Fountain, as was the 2003 Miller Lite commercials "Catfight" and the films Pretty Woman and 500 Days of Summer.

On September 22, 2019, Armenia's Prime Minister Nikol Pashinyan held a rally at the park that was attended by around 10,000 Armenian Americans.

On July 4, 2023, due to restrictions on fireworks in Downtown Los Angeles, Gloria Molina Grand Park began hosting drone shows.

== See also ==
- Bunker Hill, Los Angeles
- Civic Center, Los Angeles
- Downtown Los Angeles
- Grand Avenue Project
- Los Angeles Music Center
- Pershing Square
