= Los Angeles City Hall =

Seat of Los Angeles's government

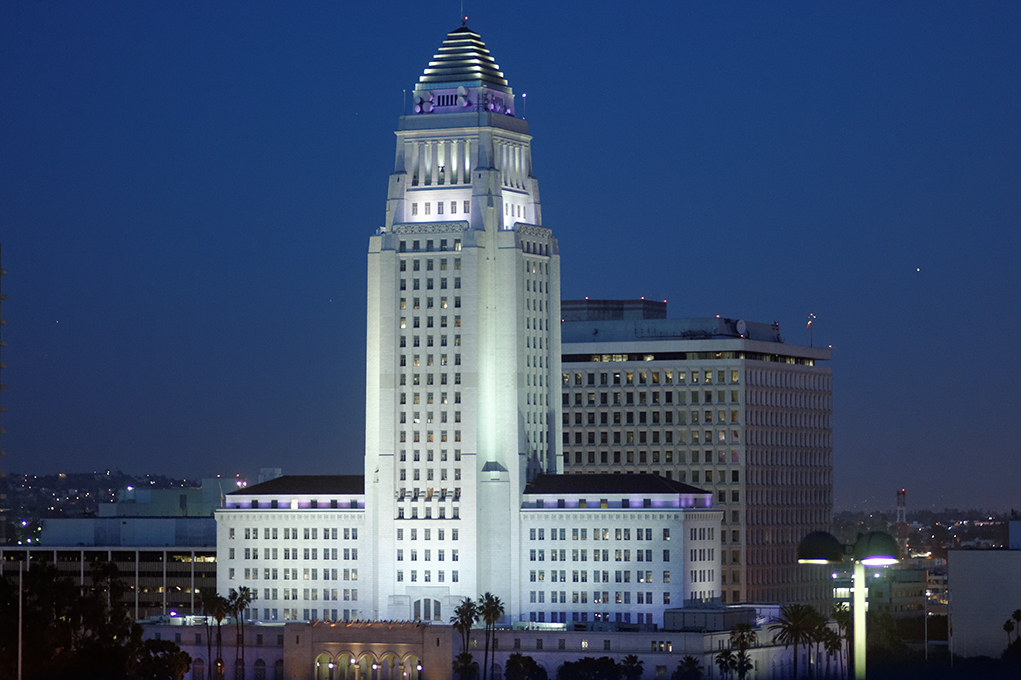
- The building in 2013

- Location within the Los Angeles metropolitan area Location within California Location within the United States
- Interactive map showing the location for Los Angeles City Hall

General information
- Status: Completed
- Type: Government offices
- Architectural style: Art Deco
- Location: 200 North Spring Street; Los Angeles, California 90012, US
- Coordinates: 34.0536°N 118.2430°W
- Construction started: 1926; 100 years ago
- Completed: 1928; 98 years ago
- Owner: City of Los Angeles
- Operator: City of Los Angeles

Height
- Roof: 138 m (453 ft)

Technical details
- Floor count: 32
- Floor area: 79,510 m^{2} (855,800 sq ft)

Design and construction
- Architects: Austin, Parkinson and Martin
- Structural engineer: Nabih Youssef Associates
- Main contractor: Bovis Lend Lease

Los Angeles Historic-Cultural Monument
- Designated: March 24, 1976
- Reference no.: 150

Los Angeles City Hall, completed in 1928, is the center of the government of the city of Los Angeles, California, and houses the mayor's office and the meeting chambers and offices of the Los Angeles City Council. It is located in the Civic Center district of downtown Los Angeles in the city block bounded by Main, Temple, First, and Spring streets, which was the heart of the city's central business district during the 1880s and 1890s.

It was the tallest building in Los Angeles from 1928 until 1966 and remains the tallest base-isolated structure in the world.

== History ==
The building was designed by John Parkinson, John C. Austin, and Albert C. Martin, Sr., and was completed in 1928. Dedication ceremonies were held on April 26, 1928. It has 32 floors and, at 454 feet (138 m) high, is the tallest base-isolated structure in the world, having undergone a seismic retrofit from 1998 to 2001, so that the building will sustain minimal damage and remain functional after a magnitude 8.2 earthquake. The concrete in its tower was made with sand from each of California's 58 counties and water from its 21 historical missions. City Hall's distinctive tower was modeled after the Mausoleum at Halicarnassus, one of the seven wonders of the ancient world, and shows the influence of the Los Angeles Public Library, completed shortly before the structure was begun. An image of City Hall has been on Los Angeles Police Department badges since 1940.

A City Council ordinance passed in 1905 did not permit any new construction to be taller than 13 stories or 150 ft (46 m) in order to keep the city's architecture harmonious. City Hall's 454 ft (138 m) height was deemed exempt as a public building and assured that no building would surpass one third its height for over three decades until the ordinance was repealed by voter referendum in 1957. Therefore, from its completion in 1928 until finally surpassed by the topping off of Union Bank Plaza in 1966, City Hall was the tallest building in Los Angeles and shared the skyline with only a few structures such as the Continental Building, the only property built taller than 150 feet (46 m) prior to the ordinance, and the Richfield Tower and Eastern Columbia Building, which exceeded the ordinance through a loophole allowing for decorative towers.

City Hall has an observation deck, free to the public and open Monday through Friday during business hours. The peak of the pyramid at the top of the building is an airplane beacon named the Lindbergh Beacon in honor of Colonel Charles A. Lindbergh. Circa 1939, there was an art gallery, in Room 351 on the third floor, that exhibited paintings by California artists.

The building was designated a Los Angeles Historic-Cultural Monument in 1976, and was listed on the National Register of Historic Places in 2025.

In 1998, the building was closed during a total $135 million refurbishment which also included upgrading it so it could withstand a magnitude 8.2 earthquake, including permitting it to sway in a quake.

== Previous city halls ==
Prior to the completion of the current structure, the L.A. City Council utilized various other buildings:

- 1850s: used rented hotel and other buildings for city meetings
- 1860s: rented adobe house on Spring Street—across from current City Hall (now parking lot for Clara Shortridge Foltz Criminal Justice Center)
- 1860s–1884: relocated to Los Angeles County Court House
- 1884–1888: moved to Mirror Building at South Spring Street and West 2nd Street (site of former Los Angeles Times Building)
- 1888–1928: moved to new Romanesque Revival building on 226-238 South Broadway between 2nd Street and 3rd Street; demolished in 1928 and now site of parking lot between LA Times parking structure and 240 Broadway. Beams from the building ended up repurposed in the construction of writer Frank Scully's 1936 Mediterranean Revival home at 2071 Grace Ave, in the Whitley Heights neighborhood of Los Angeles.

== Usage ==
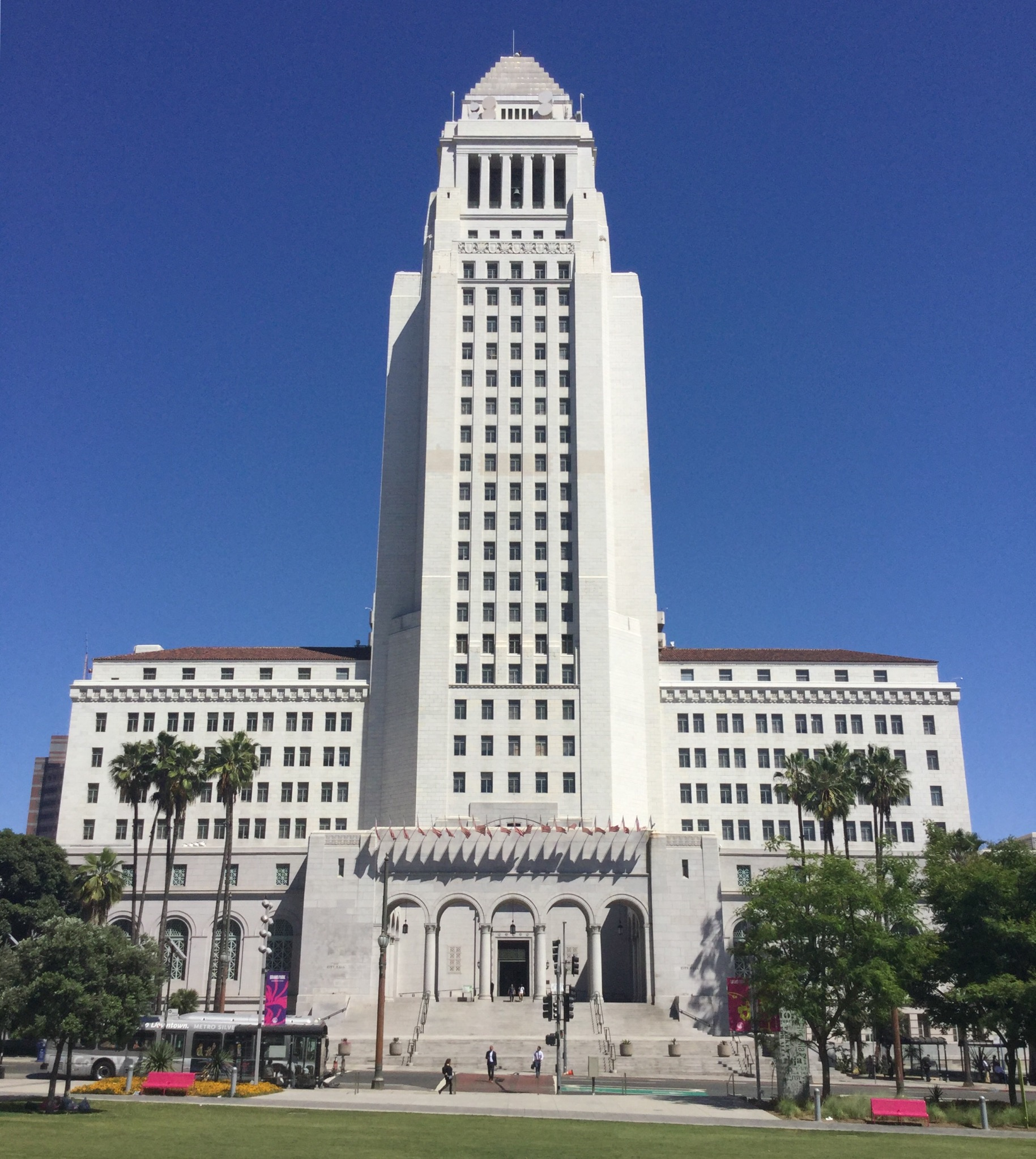
Tallest base-isolated structure in the world, built in 1928. A Neoclassical base with an Art Deco tower. Los Angeles Historic-Cultural Monument #150.

The Mayor of Los Angeles has an office in room 300. Every Tuesday, Wednesday, and Friday at 10:00 am, the Los Angeles City Council meets in its chamber.

An observation level is open to the public on the 27th floor. This floor's interior comprises a single large and highly vaulted room distinguished by the iconic tall square columns that are far more familiar as one of the building's most distinguishing exterior features. As this ample interior space is named, the Mayor Tom Bradley Room is used for ceremonies and other special occasions.

City Hall and the adjacent federal, state, and county buildings are served by the Civic Center station on the Metro B and D subway lines and the Historic Broadway station on the Metro A and E light rail lines. The J Line stops in front of the building.

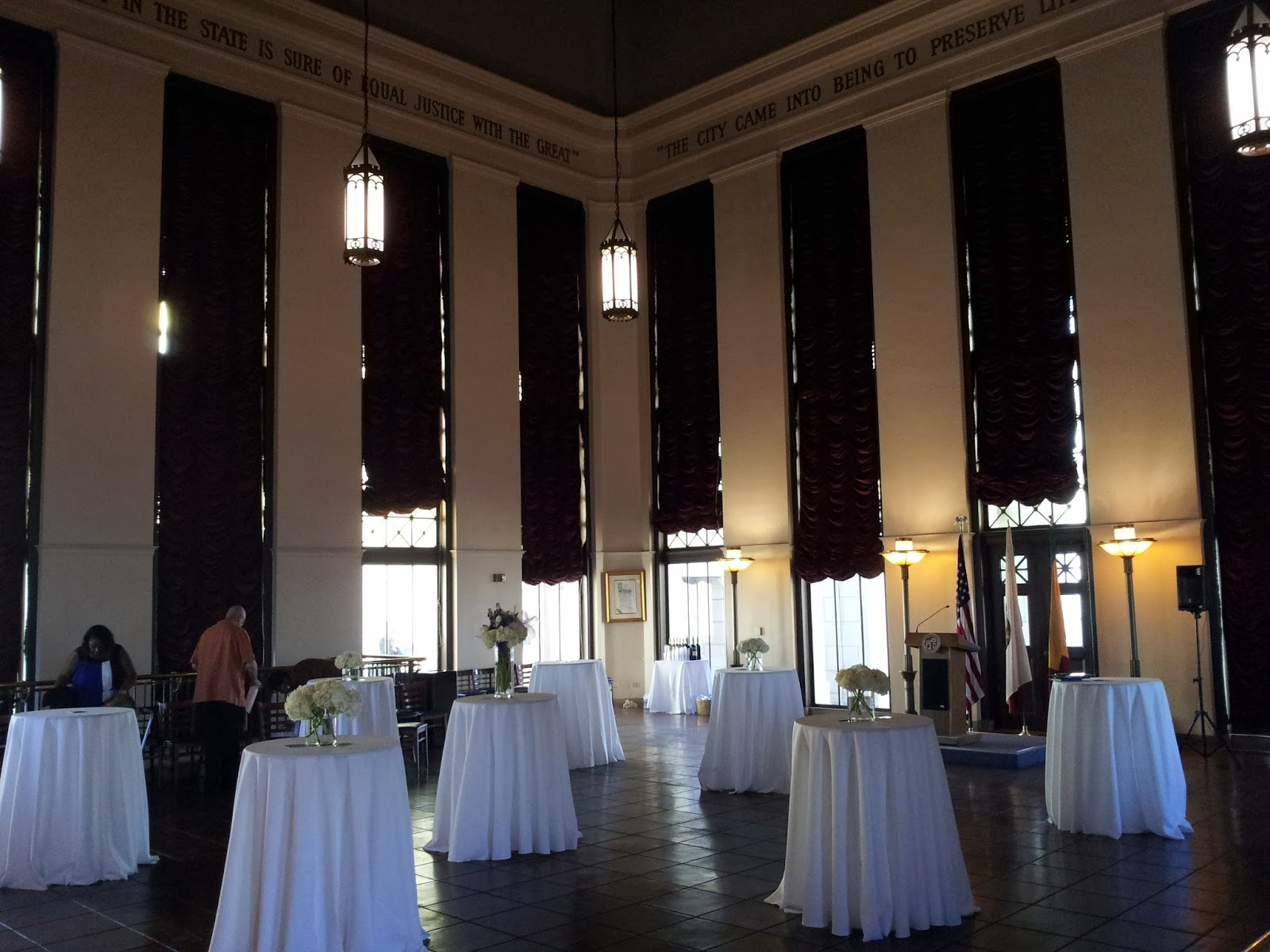
The Tom Bradley Room, making up the whole interior of L.A. City Hall's 27th floor

The Los Angeles Dodgers wore a commemorative uniform patch during the 2018 season celebrating 60 years in the city depicting a logo of Los Angeles City Hall.

== Filming location ==
The building has been featured in the following popular movies and television shows. It also appears incidentally as an icon of officialdom in many movies from the Golden Age of Hollywood.

- While the City Sleeps (1928): The newly constructed building appears in the background of some exterior shots in this silent crime drama starring Lon Chaney, even though the film is set in New York.
- Adventures of Superman: The building appears as the Daily Planet building beginning in the second season of the 1950s TV series. At the time the TV program was broadcast, the show's Daily Planet building (Los Angeles City Hall) was frequently confused with the similarly designed Pennsylvania Power & Light Building in Allentown, also built in 1928. Additionally, the exact design of this building is used as the Newstime magazine headquarters in the Superman comic books.
- Alias: A CIA black ops unit is located behind a maintenance door at Civic Station.
- Dragnet: The building appears as itself in the TV series. The first episode of Dragnet (1951) Season 1, Episode 1: "The Human Bomb", original air date 16 December 1951, was filmed at Los Angeles City Hall. It was embossed on Sgt. Joe Friday's famous badge number 714 that was displayed under the credits.
- Perry Mason: The City Hall building appears in the view from Perry's office window. This has led viewers of the show to speculate where the fictional office would have been located in downtown Los Angeles.
- L.A. Confidential: The police in the 1997 neo-noir film operate out of the City Hall, as well as the police badges featuring a depiction the building itself. At the time the film takes place no building in Los Angeles was allowed to be taller than City Hall, so the cameras were placed at certain points so that any building taller than City Hall would not be seen.
- Tower of Terror: In this 1997 made-for-TV movie, the main character's love interest works at a fictional newspaper, The Los Angeles Banner. The newspaper's logo is based on the top of City Hall.
- Adam-12: During the seventh season opening credits montage, City Hall is shown directly at the end, as the building that officers Reed and Malloy drive away from. It is also shown on the embossed badges numbered 744 (Malloy) and 2430 (Reed).
- The 2003 Dragnet series used the L.A. City Hall building aerial shot and badge throughout its introduction.
- War of the Worlds: The City Hall was destroyed (albeit by miniature) in the 1953 film version (although the H. G. Wells book has the aliens attacking London, the setting was changed to Los Angeles for the film).
- V: City Hall was destroyed when the Visitors attack Earth. The same footage of the tower being destroyed from War of the Worlds was used but with different energy weapons superimposed.
- The 1976 film The Bad News Bears included a scene both shot and set in the city council chamber that included a close-up of the electronic voting board with the names of the incumbent council members.
- The 1991 music video for Prince's "Diamonds and Pearls" features City Hall as the primary location.
- AFI's music video for their 2006 song "Miss Murder" was filmed at City Hall.
- The 2011 film Atlas Shrugged: Part I.
- The 2011 series Torchwood: Miracle Day used the main entrance of City Hall to represent the CIA archive Esther Drummond visits in "The New World", and the exterior to the medical conference where Vera Juarez meets Jilly Kitzinger in "Rendition"/"Dead of Night".
- The 2013 film The Employer uses City Hall as the headquarters of the fictional Carcharias Corporation.
- The 2013 film Gangster Squad features the Los Angeles City Hall, with the members of the Gangster Squad stood in the foreground of the building, as well as it being used in the background of some scenes. Mayor Villaraigosa's conference room was also used for the office of Police Chief Parker.
- The Amazing Race 25: City Hall appeared during the season finale, with teams having to bring a film permit to the building.

== Structural Engineers ==
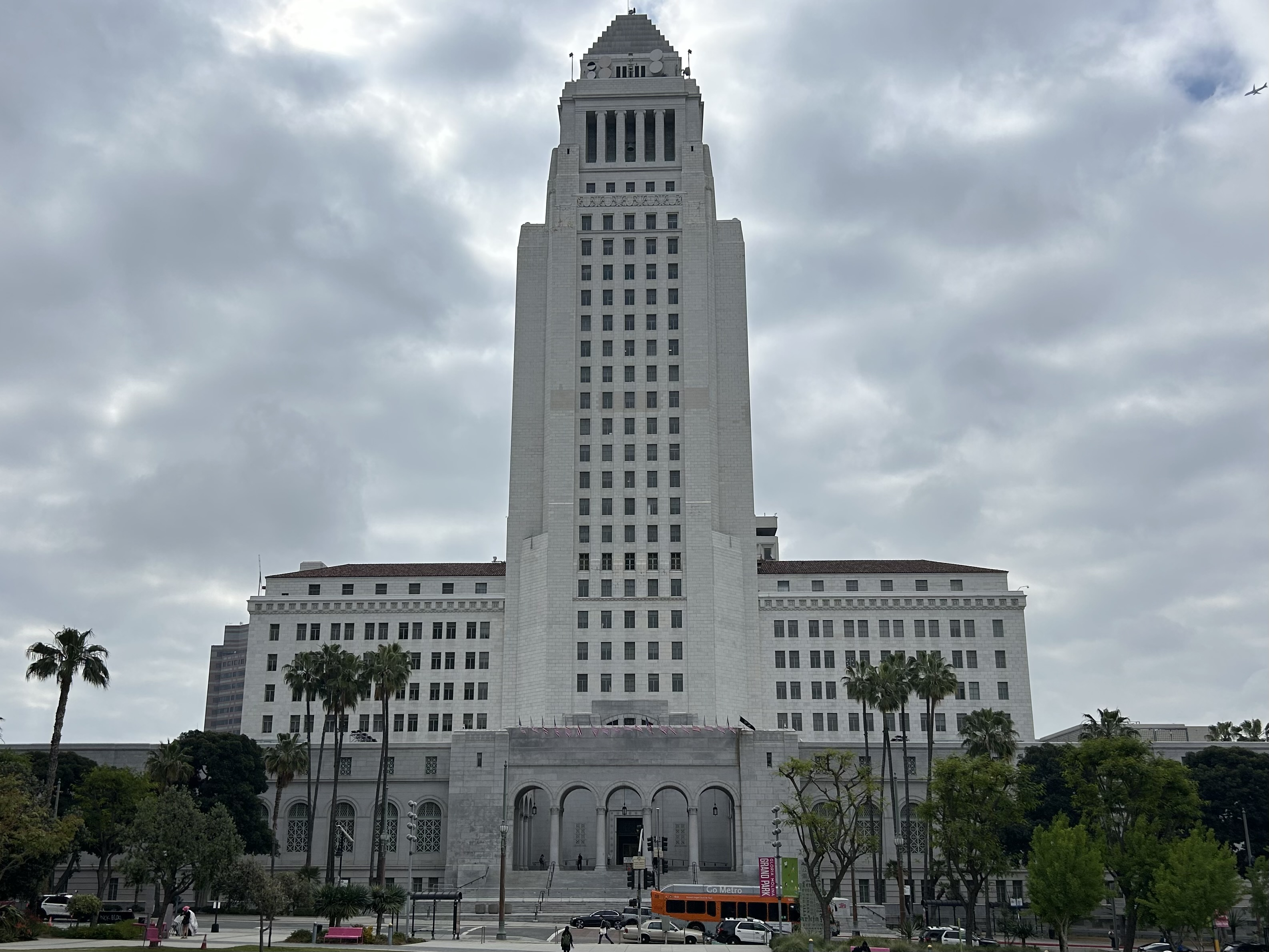
View of the building in 2025

=== Overview ===
The seismic retrofit of Los Angeles City Hall is precedent‐setting for being the tallest building ever to be base isolated. The hybrid damping system that was developed reduces the level of inter‐story drift, story shear, and acceleration experienced by the tower structure to maintain continuous use and preserve its historic features during future seismic events.

Los Angeles City Hall was designed to resemble the Mausoleum at Halicarnassus and was dedicated in 1928. This historic landmark is a 36‐story, 460 foot tall, steel‐frame building with riveted connections. The gravity system consists of a concrete encased steel frame and reinforced concrete slab/pan‐joist floor system. The typical beam-to‐column connection is a riveted “wind connection” with top and bottom seat angles. City Hall was built prior to the enactment of explicit seismic design requirements, and is the first building in Los Angeles to exceed the 150 foot height limitation for all privately constructed buildings.

City Hall, being culturally/historically significant and an essential government facility, needed restoration and strengthening work to be performed in order to remain functional after a magnitude 8.2 quake on the San Andreas fault. Project requirements also called for compliance with all current life safety requirements, and the protection of the building’s exterior façade and historic interior fabric, which were frequently damaged during regional earthquakes over the last 70 years.

=== Challenges ===
Seismic performance criteria could not be easily developed using code‐based approaches, since code techniques are not capable of predicting damage levels or the specific performance of a building. Additionally, the structural system and type of construction used for City Hall is prohibited by current codes. The City of Los Angeles required considerable convincing to select the base isolation scheme that proved to be the most efficient and effective design strategy, based on results of non‐linear analysis. LA City Hall would be the tallest building ever to be base isolated by more than doubling the story‐height previously reached with the same system. Concern focused on the building’s tendency to overturn or flip during an earthquake, and on making sure the building’s seismic resistance level was never reduced or compromised during construction with interim bracing. Equally challenging and critical to the comprehensive seismic renovation of City Hall was the assurance that years of valued cultural heritage would not be lost.

=== Creative Solutions ===
The seismic system developed for City Hall was a hybrid system combining seismic isolation bearings, shear walls, and viscous dampers at the top of the structure and the plane of isolation at the base. This system provides a level of life safety and damage control that exceeds the level provided by conventional strengthening schemes.

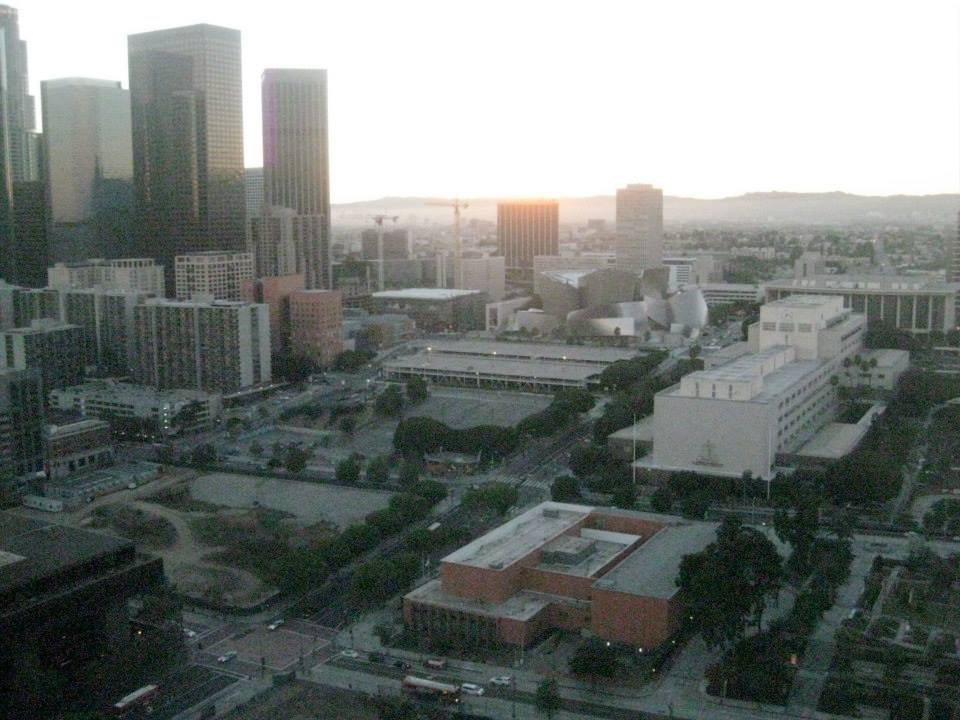
Partial view of the L.A. skyline from the City Hall observation deck.

Nabih Youssef Associates Structural Engineers (NYA) had to establish the seismic performance goals in order to develop the criteria for the evaluation of the existing structure and the design of potential strengthening schemes. These performance goals were quantified in engineering criteria as analytical limit states, which were determined using the latest research data available regarding the seismic performance of existing buildings combined with guidelines developed for life safety protection and damage mitigation. Various in‐situ tests were also performed to determine the properties and strength of the materials used to construct the existing building. The results of the tests were used to develop non‐lnear models of structural components of the building that were incorporated into models of the global structure. These global models were verified by ambient and full‐scale forced vibration tests performed on the building to account for all non‐structural systems contributing to stiffness. The models were used to perform non‐linear dynamic analyses of the existing and base isolated building.

The base isolation system consists of 416 high damping rubber bearings, 90 flat sliding bearings, and 52 viscous dampers installed between the basement and foundation levels of the building. The viscous dampers were added to limit the maximum displacement at the plane of isolation and to dissipate seismic energy from near fault seismic events. The isolation system is designed for a maximum displacement of 21 inches. Thick concrete outrigger walls were also designed for the basement and subbasement levels to distribute axial loads over a number of bearings when subjected to overturning moment. At columns where net vertical displacements were anticipated, specially designed loose bolt connections were made to prevent damage to the isolation bearing. During construction, two‐feet thick, two‐story high concrete shear walls were added under the tower portion of the building to carry the existing column loads during the installation of the base isolation bearings, saving considerable installation time and cost.

The existing reinforced concrete walls of the superstructure were strengthened and 12 viscous dampers were installed at the 24th floor – results of the analyses indicated that the upper portion of the tower experienced amplified response (whiplash effect) due to the significant change in lateral stiffness in the transition to the 25th floor – to reduce the acceleration response at the top of the building. LA City Hall became one of the most comprehensive seismic upgrades in the country. The hybrid damping system that was developed is especially effective in controlling the response of LA City Hall to earthquake ground motions. After all was done, including minor interior remodeling, code‐related improvements, and earthquake repairs, City Hall now stands visibly possessive of its old historic look, albeit with an up‐to‐date performance level.

== NYA's Awards ==
2004 SEAOC “Excellence in Structural Engineering Award for Best Historic Preservation”.

2002 Los Angeles Conservancy “Preservation Award”.

2002 City of Los Angeles Cultural Heritage Commission “Heritage Award” “Hybrid System for Response Modification through Isolation & Supplemental Damping at Multiple Levels”.

== Gallery ==
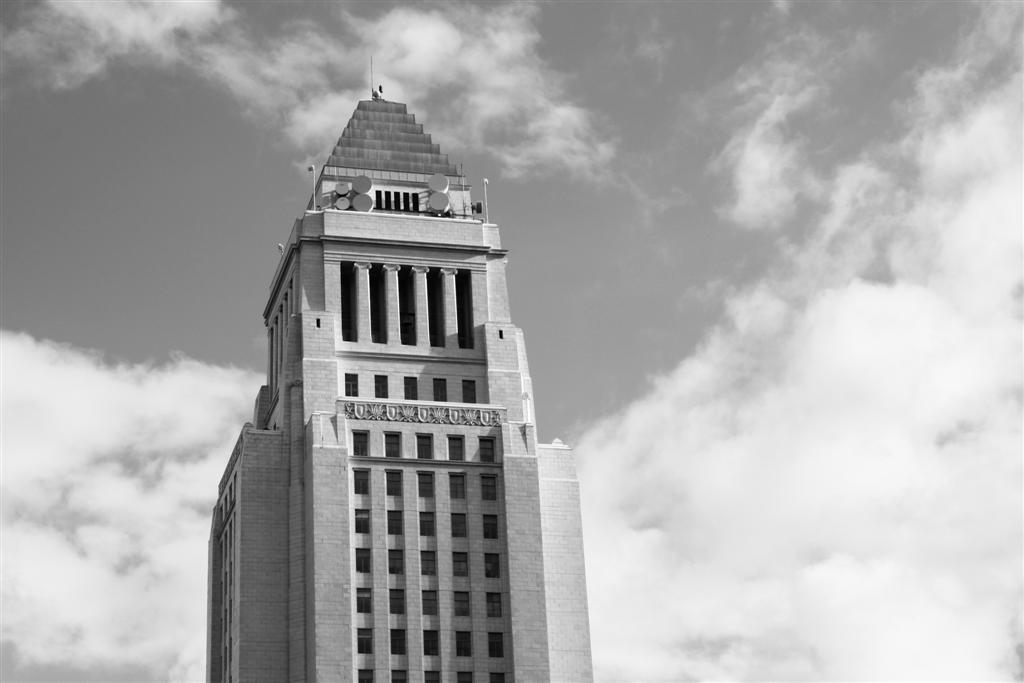
Detailed top of City Hall

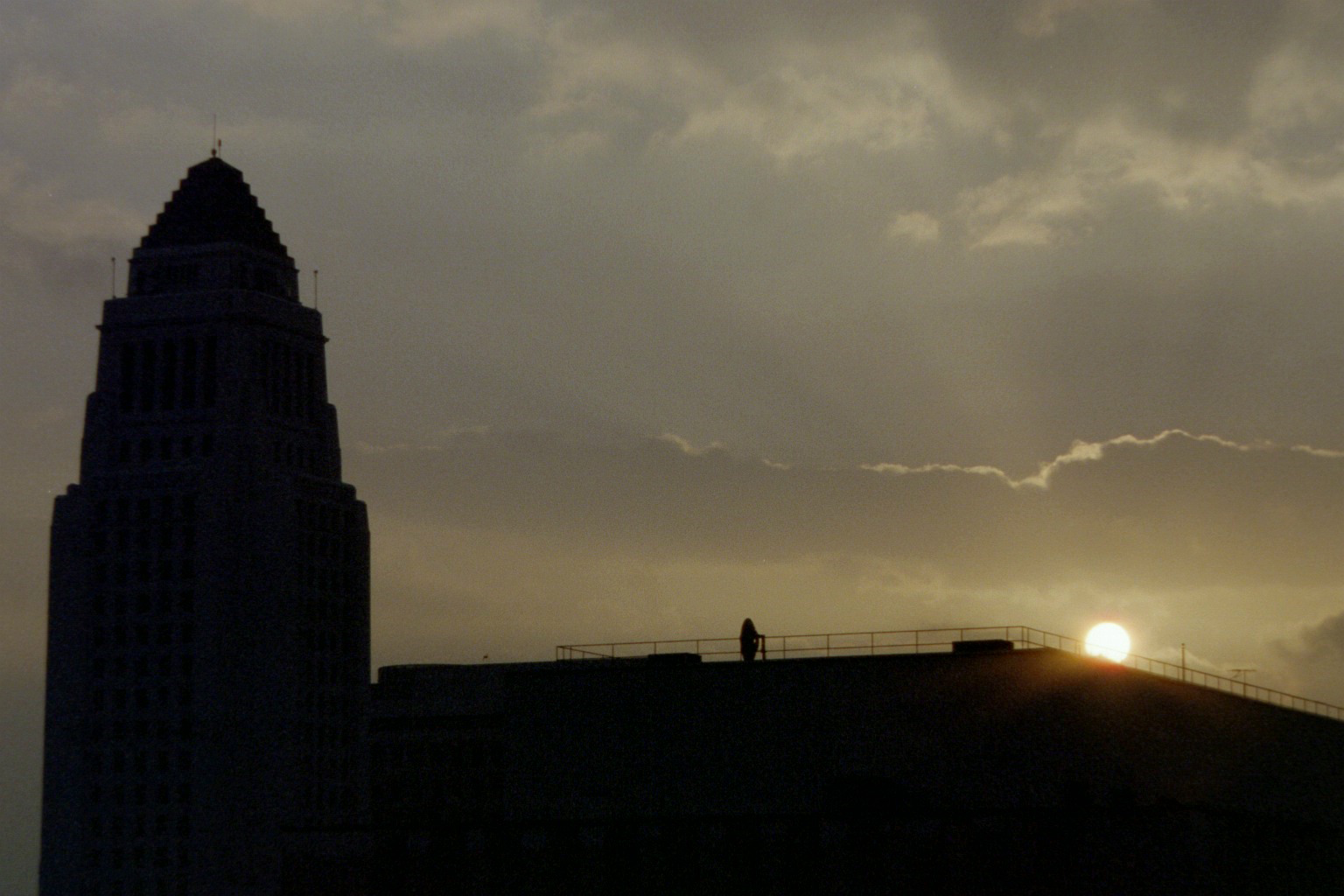
The silhouette of City Hall at sunrise

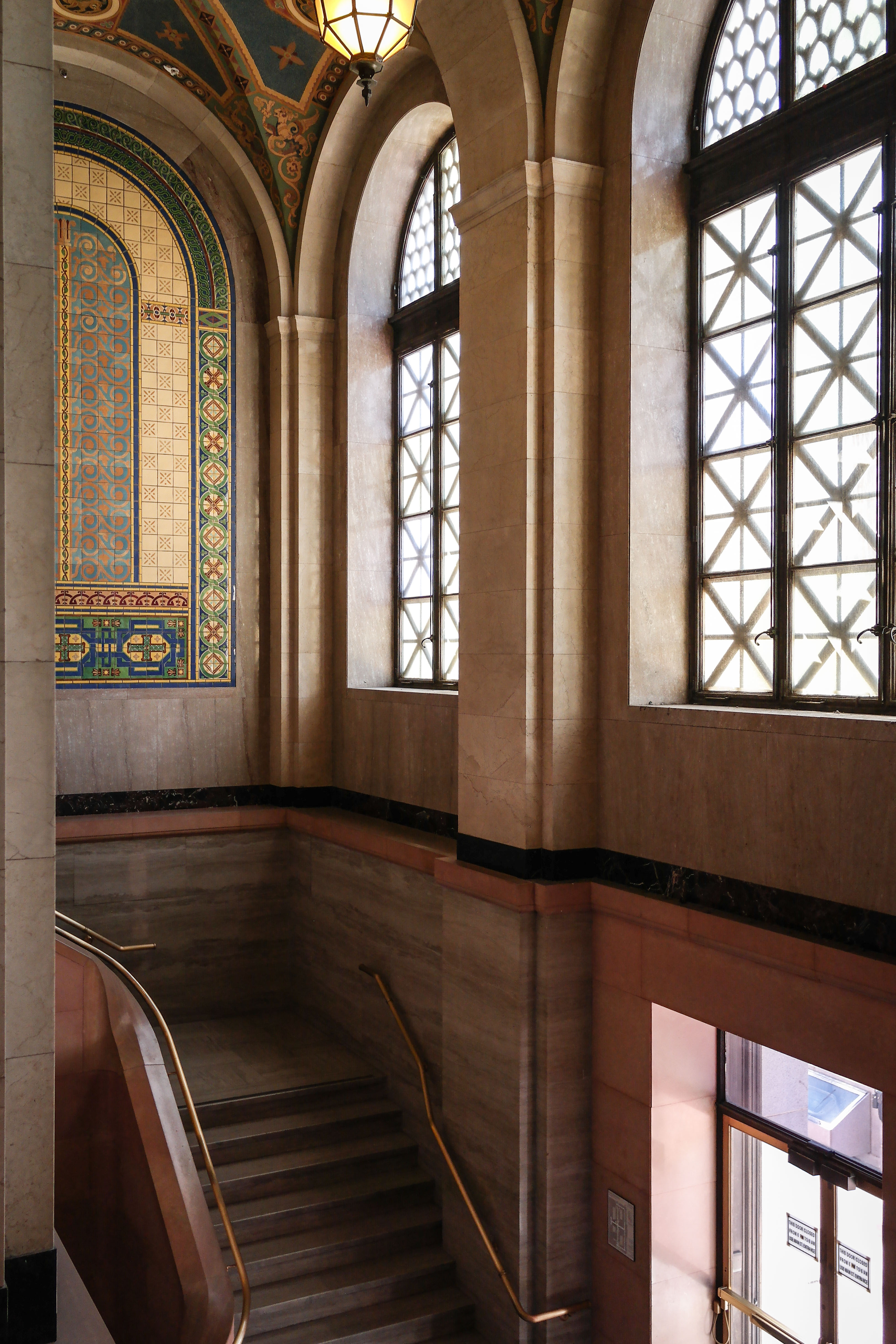
Stairs of City Hall

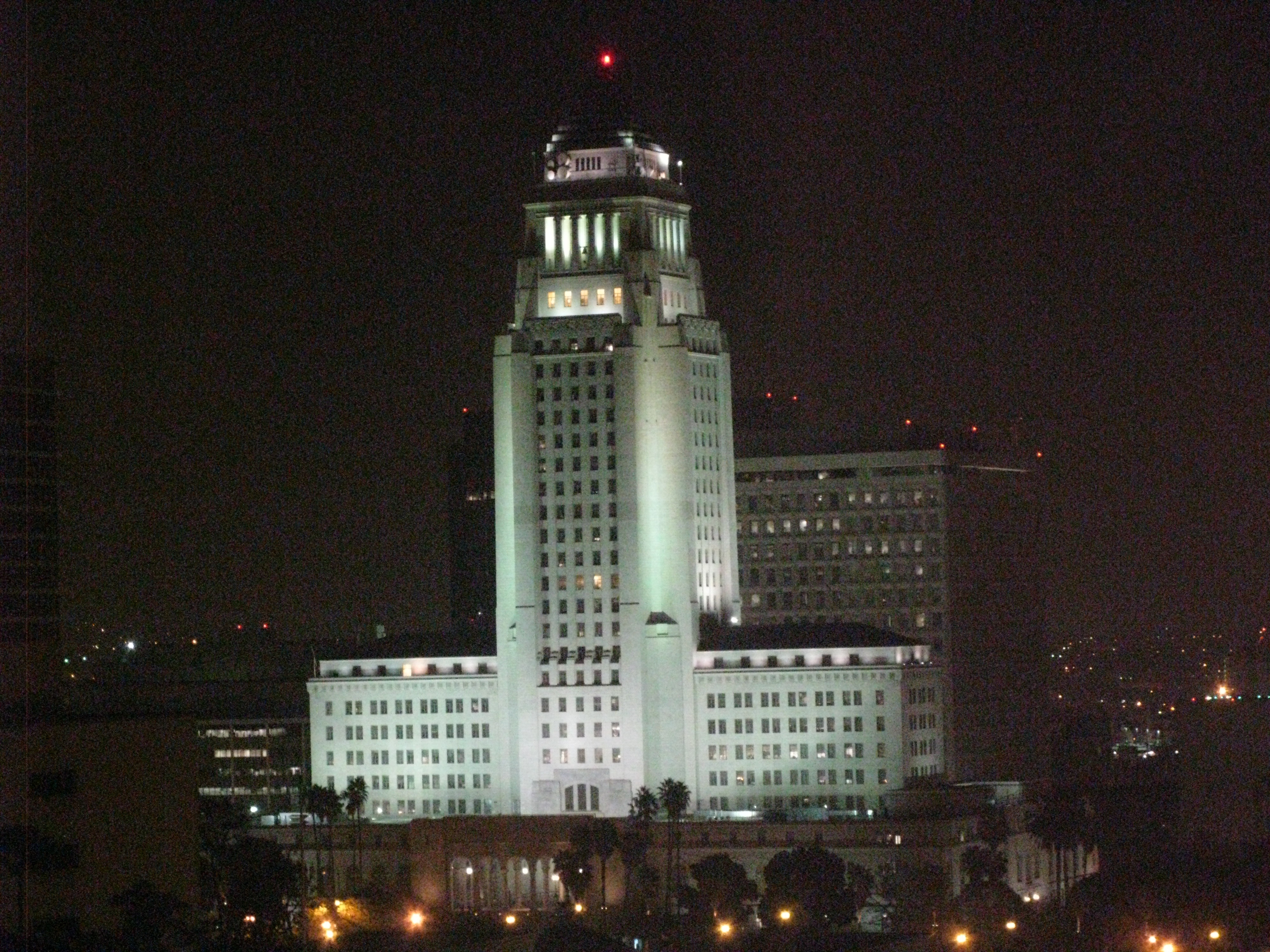
Seen at night from the Walt Disney Concert Hall

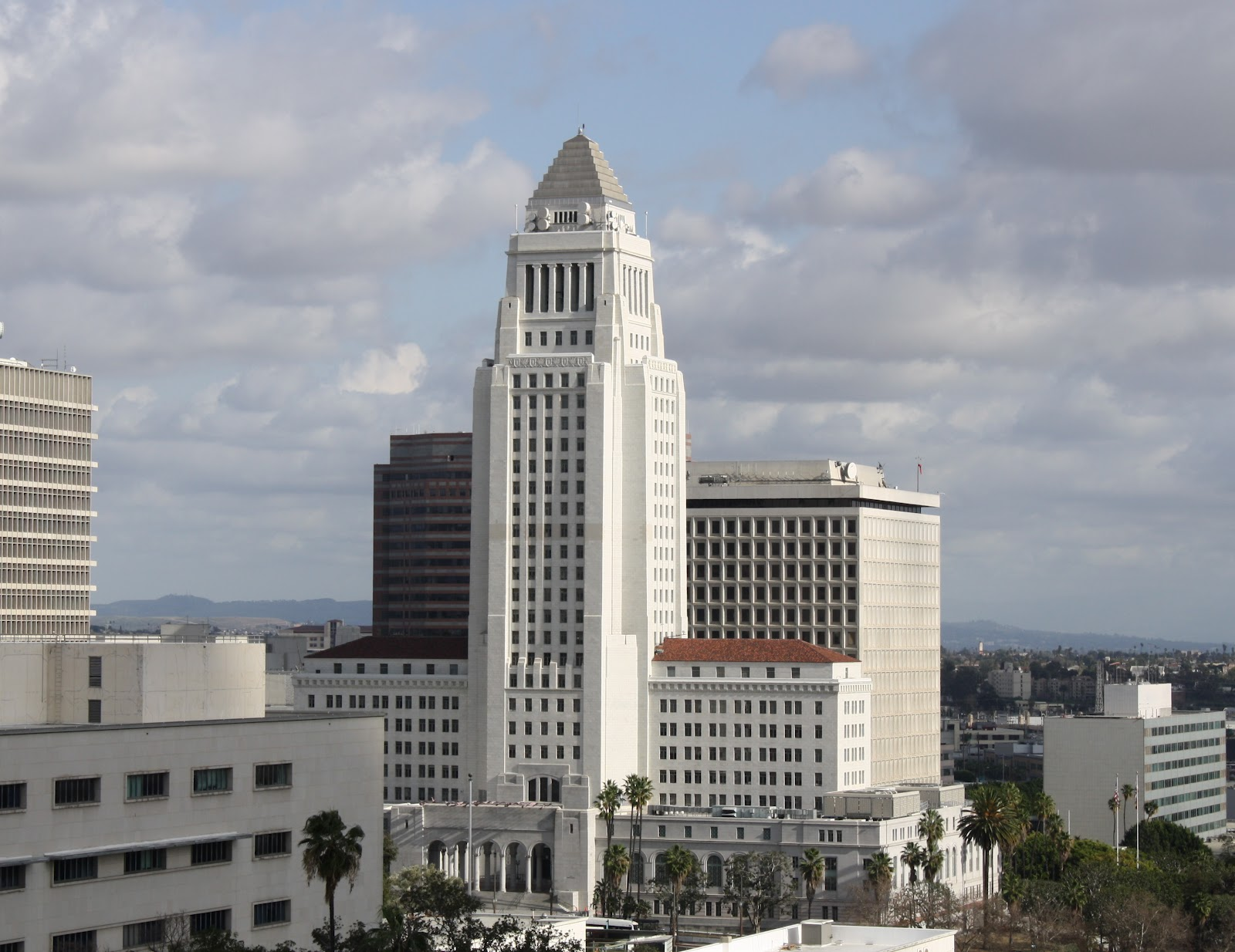
During the day, from the Walt Disney Concert Hall

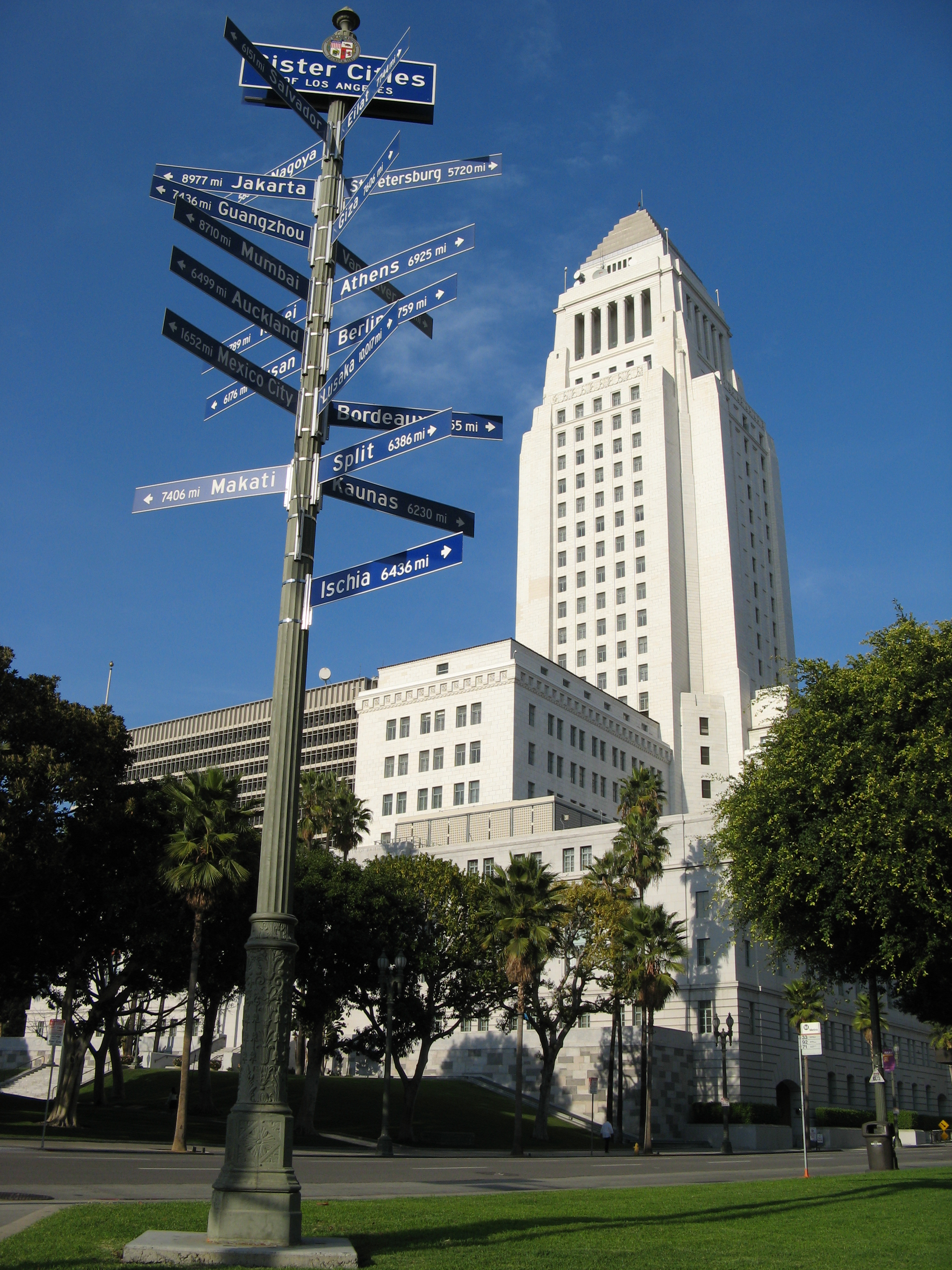
City Hall with a street sign indicating Los Angeles' twin towns and sister cities

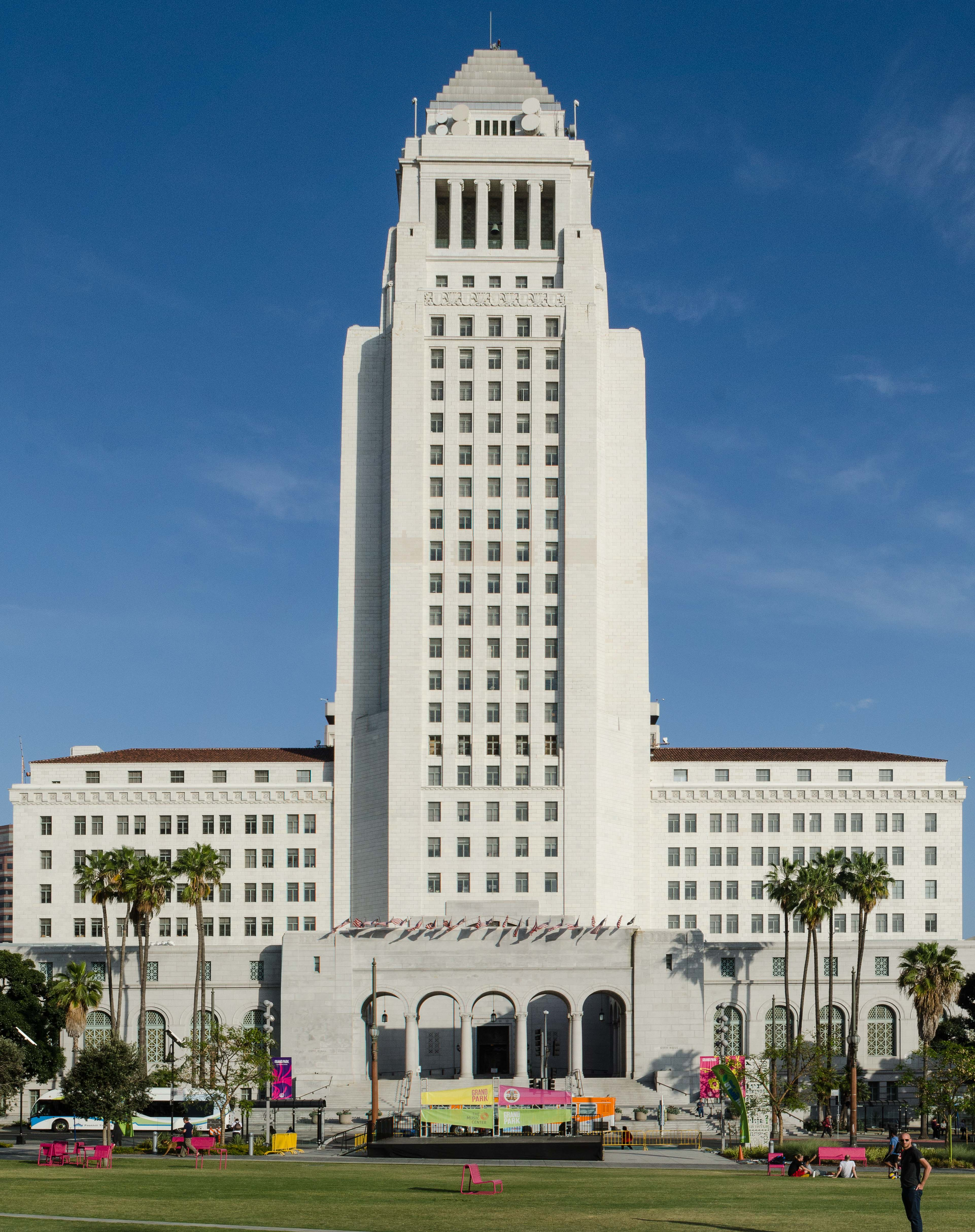
As seen from Grand Park

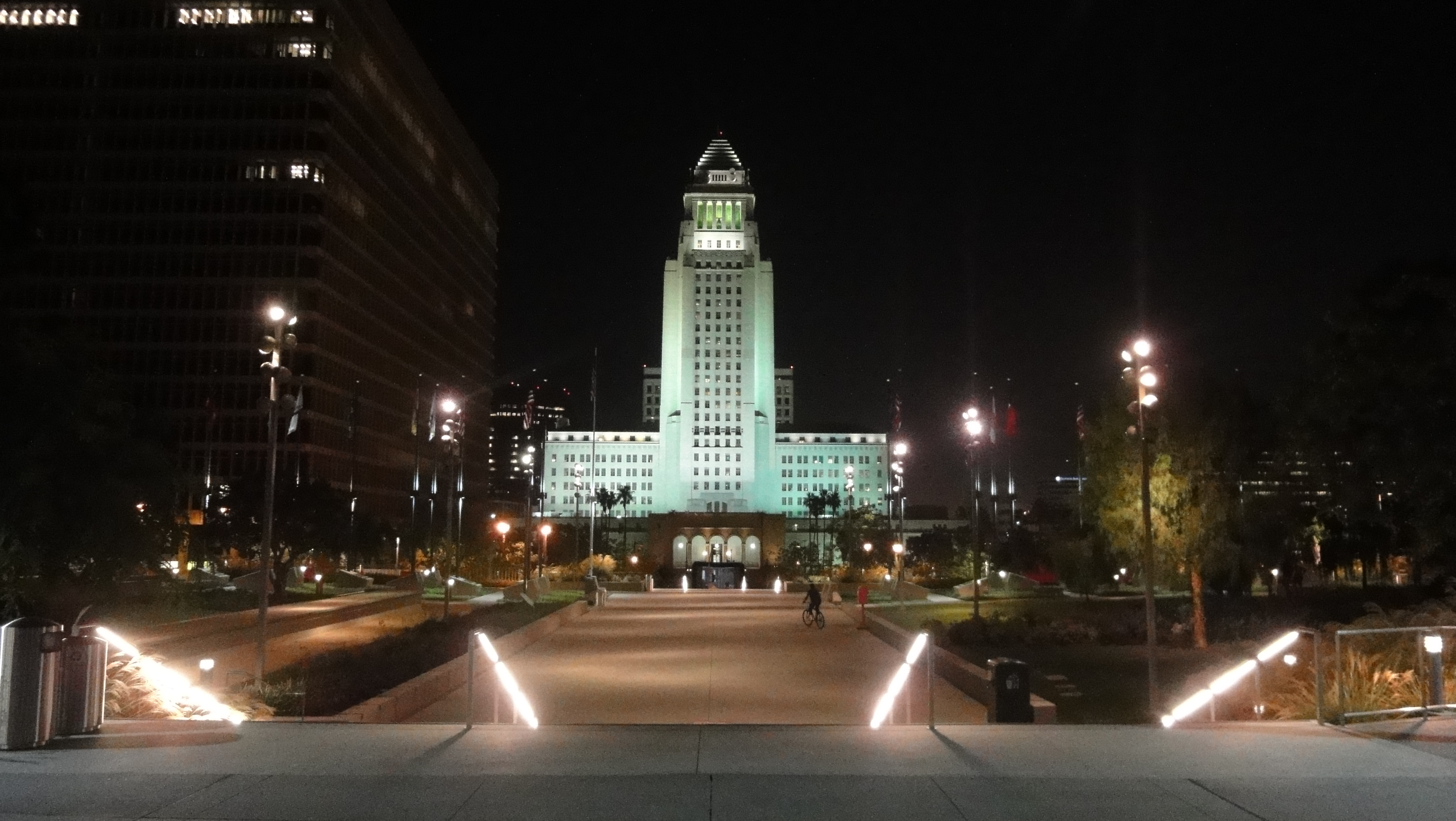
City Hall at night from Grand Park

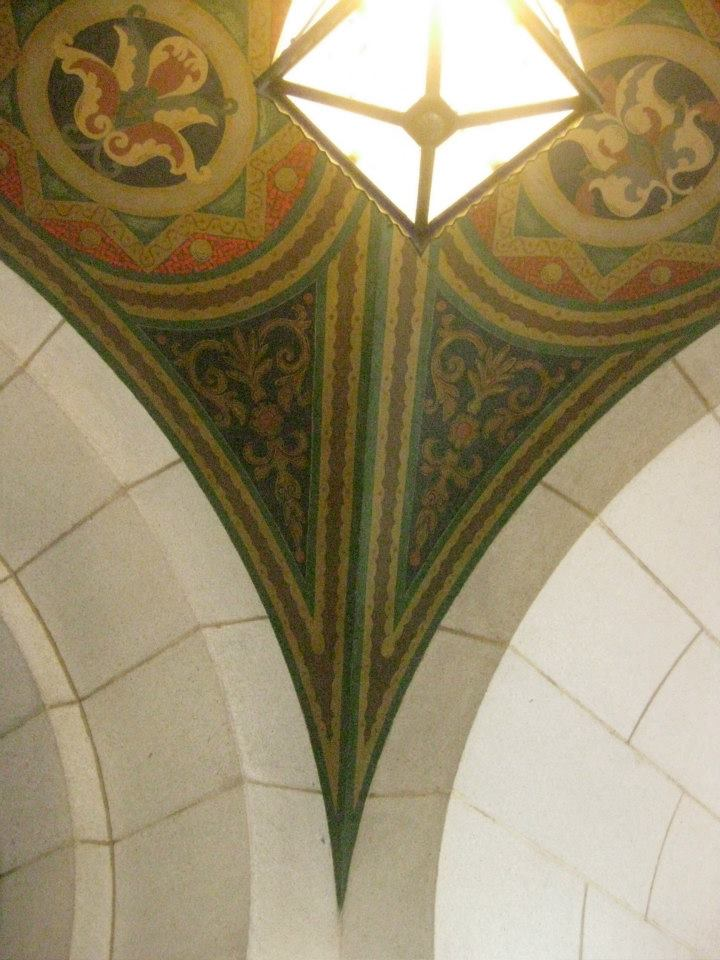
Paintwork on the ceiling

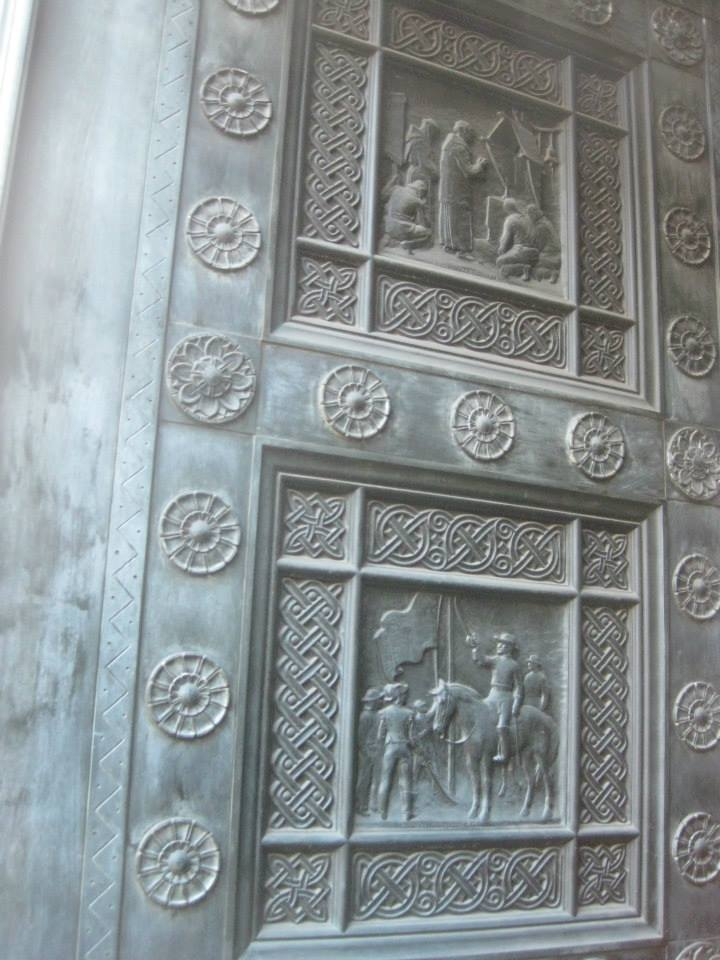
Bronze doors depicting scenes from California history

== City Hall South ==
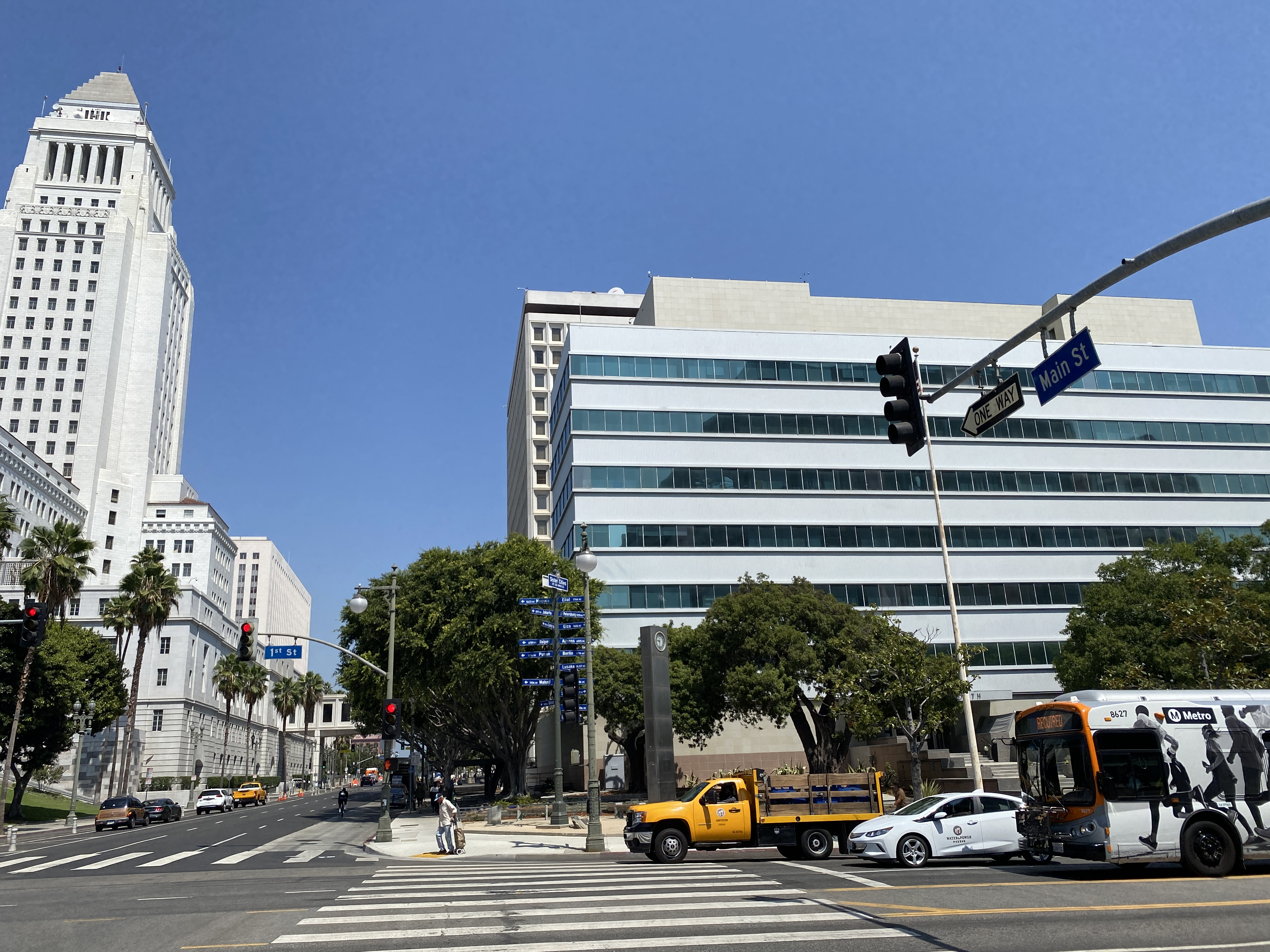
Looking north on Main St. from 1st St., 2020 with City Hall South (r), behind it a small portion of City Hall East; and on the left, City Hall proper

City Hall South at 111 E. First Street, on the north side of First Street between Los Angeles and Main streets, built in 1952-4, architects Lunden, Hayward & O'Connor, International Style, originally opened as the City Health Building, housing health offices, clinics, and labs, and a central utility plant that heated City Hall proper and Parker Center (then police headquarters).

== City Hall East ==
James K. Hahn City Hall East, 200 N. Main St., is located in the South Plaza of the Los Angeles Mall, a sunken, multi-level series of open spaces and retail space on the east side of Main Street straddling Temple Street. It is an 18-story, Brutalist, 1972 building by Stanton & Stockwell, featuring a mural by Millard Sheets, The Family of Man.

== See also ==
- List of tallest buildings in Los Angeles
- Grand Park
- Regional Connector
- Base isolation
- Earthquake engineering
- International Savings & Exchange Bank Building
- Los Angeles Times Building
- Clara Shortridge Foltz Criminal Justice Center
- Mausoleum at Halicarnassus
