= Stanley Mosk Courthouse =

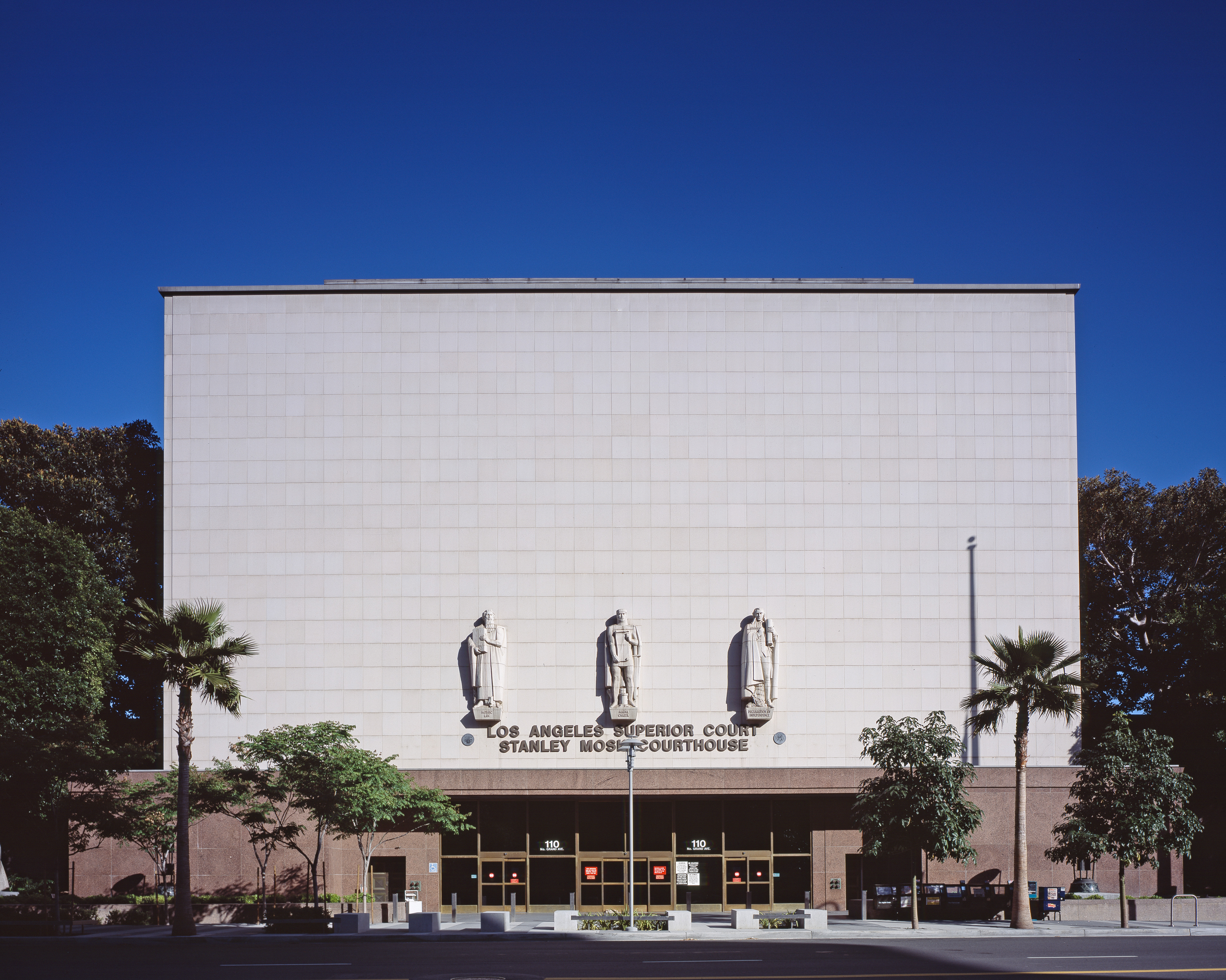
- Grand Avenue entrance of the building
- Interactive map of the Stanley Mosk Courthouse area
- Former names: Los Angeles County Courthouse

General information
- Type: Courthouse
- Architectural style: Late Moderne
- Location: 111 N. Hill Street, Los Angeles, United States
- Coordinates: 34°03′19″N 118°14′49″W
- Current tenants: Los Angeles County Superior Court
- Named for: Stanley Mosk
- Completed: 1958
- Opened: January 5, 1959; 67 years ago
- Landlord: Los Angeles County

Height
- Height: 80 feet (24 m)

Technical details
- Floor count: 6
- Floor area: 220,860 square feet (20,519 m^{2}) (west wing); 515,340 square feet (47,877 m^{2}) (east wing)

Design and construction
- Architecture firm: Stanton, Stockwell, Williams and Wilson

Other information
- Number of rooms: 100 courtrooms
- Public transit: Civic Center/Grand Park

The Stanley Mosk Courthouse is a courthouse in Los Angeles, California home to the Los Angeles County Superior Court. It is located at 110 N. Grand Avenue and 111 N. Hill Street between Temple and First streets, lining Grand Park in the Civic Center in Downtown Los Angeles. The building was constructed in 1958 and has a floor area of 220,860 square feet (20,519 m^{2}) in its west wing and 515,340 square feet (47,877 m^{2}) in the east wing. It has 100 courtrooms, 840 daily workers and 7000 daily visitors. The courthouse is often seen in the TV series Perry Mason, when the title character parks his car on Hill Street to go inside the building.

The architects were Stanton, Stockwell, Williams and Wilson, in Late Moderne style, which incorporates elements of both the Streamline Moderne and International style. The team of architects designed the courthouse simultaneously with the Kenneth Hahn Hall of Administration (1960), both buildings conceived as part of the monumental 1947 Civic Center Master Plan. That plan also called for the extension of the Los Angeles Civic Center westward to incorporate the north end of the Bunker Hill area, which had been demolished, and created the east–west axis of civic buildings along what is today Grand Park. The courthouse was opened by Chief Justice Earl Warren in October 31, 1958. The courthouse was later named in honor of Stanley Mosk, the longest serving justice on the California Supreme Court and former Attorney General of California, in 2002.

Since 2019, the courthouse has gained prominence as the site of the conservatorship dispute of Britney Spears, and the corresponding #FreeBritney rallies which have taken place there.

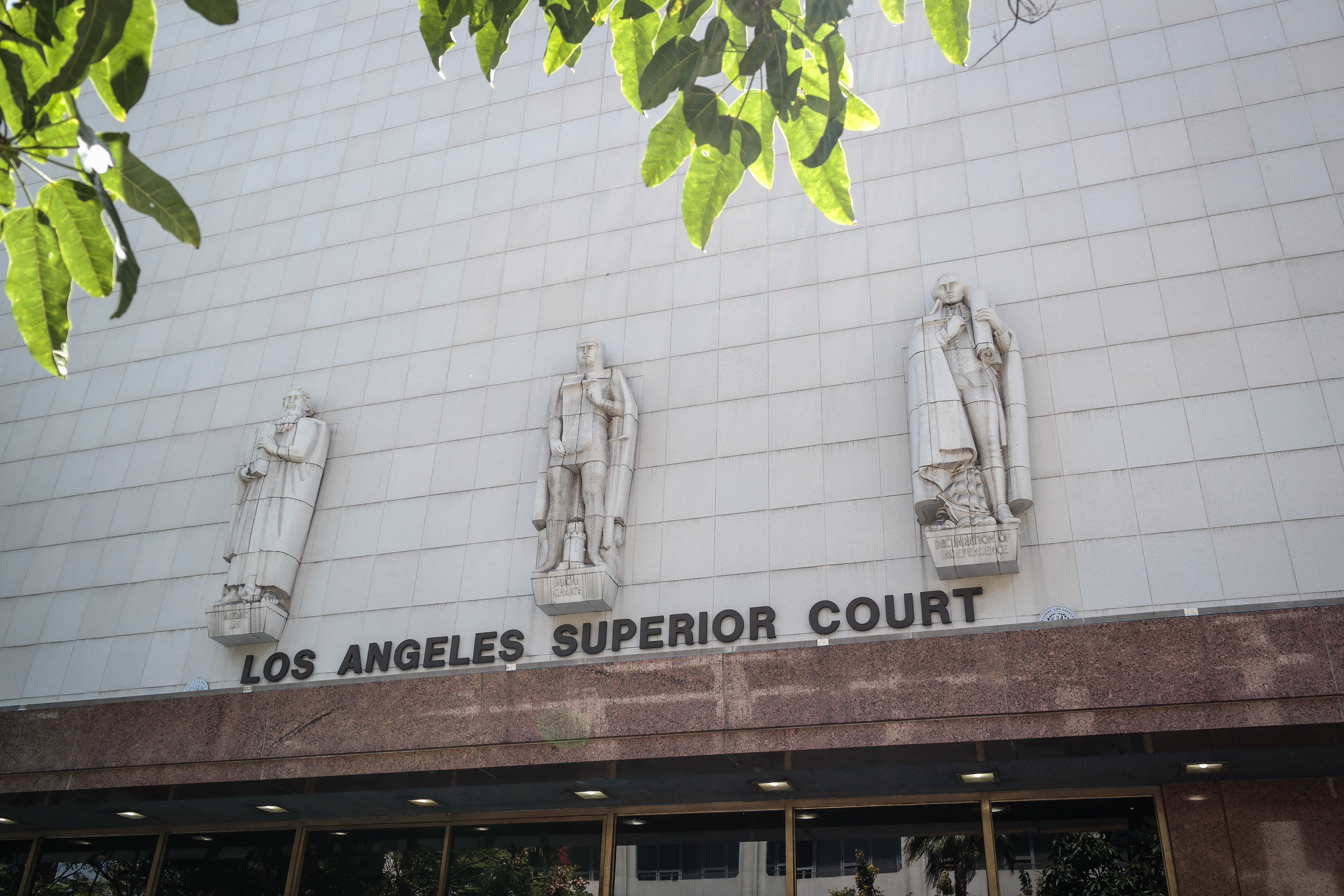
Closeup of Grand Avenue façade with relief statues

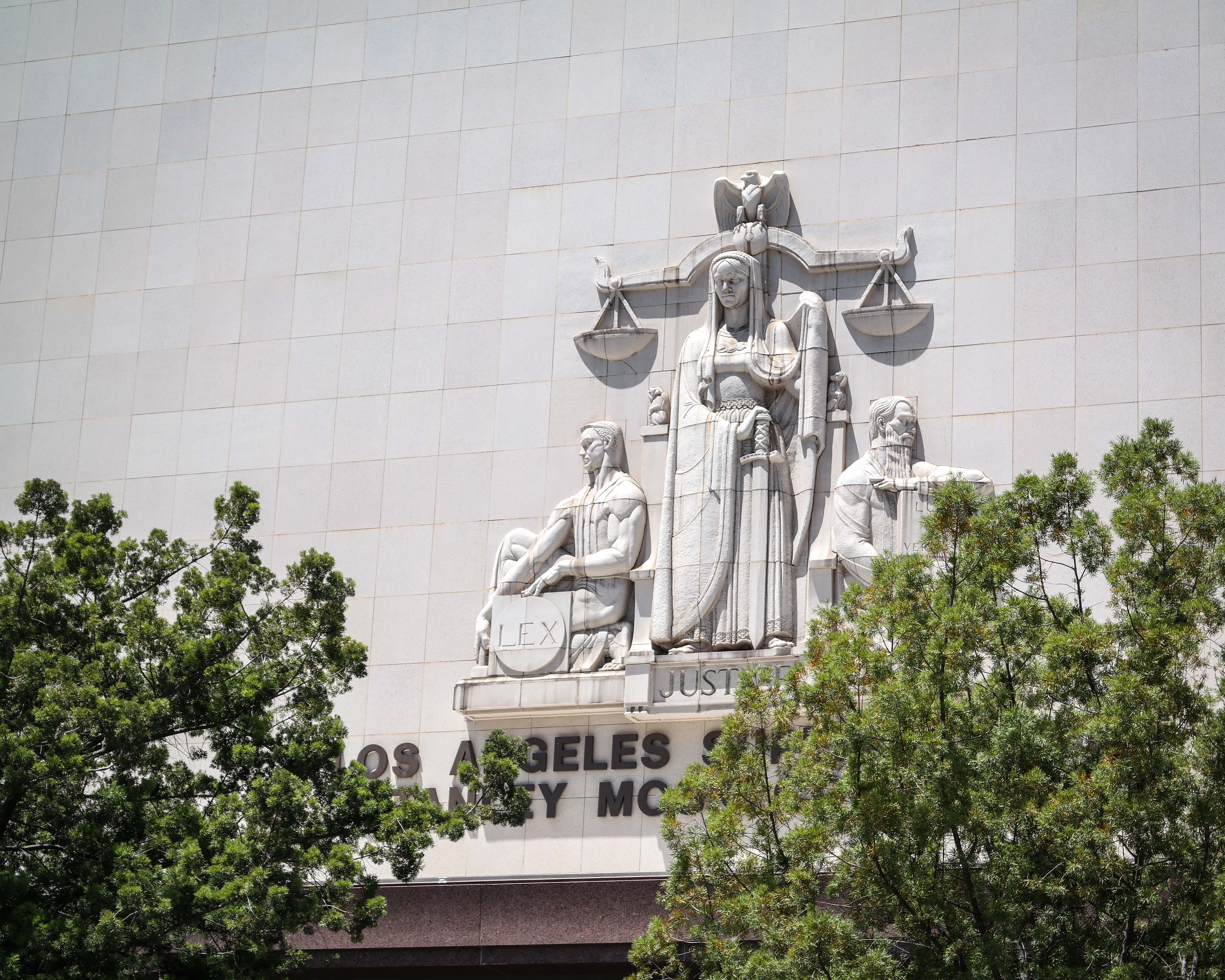
Hill Street façade with relief statues
