= Grand Avenue (Los Angeles) =

Major north–south thoroughfare in Los Angeles, California

Grand Avenue is a major north–south thoroughfare in Los Angeles, California. Primarily located in downtown's Bunker Hill, Financial, and South Park districts, the avenue features many of the area's most notable destinations, and also connects to City Hall via Grand Park.

== History ==
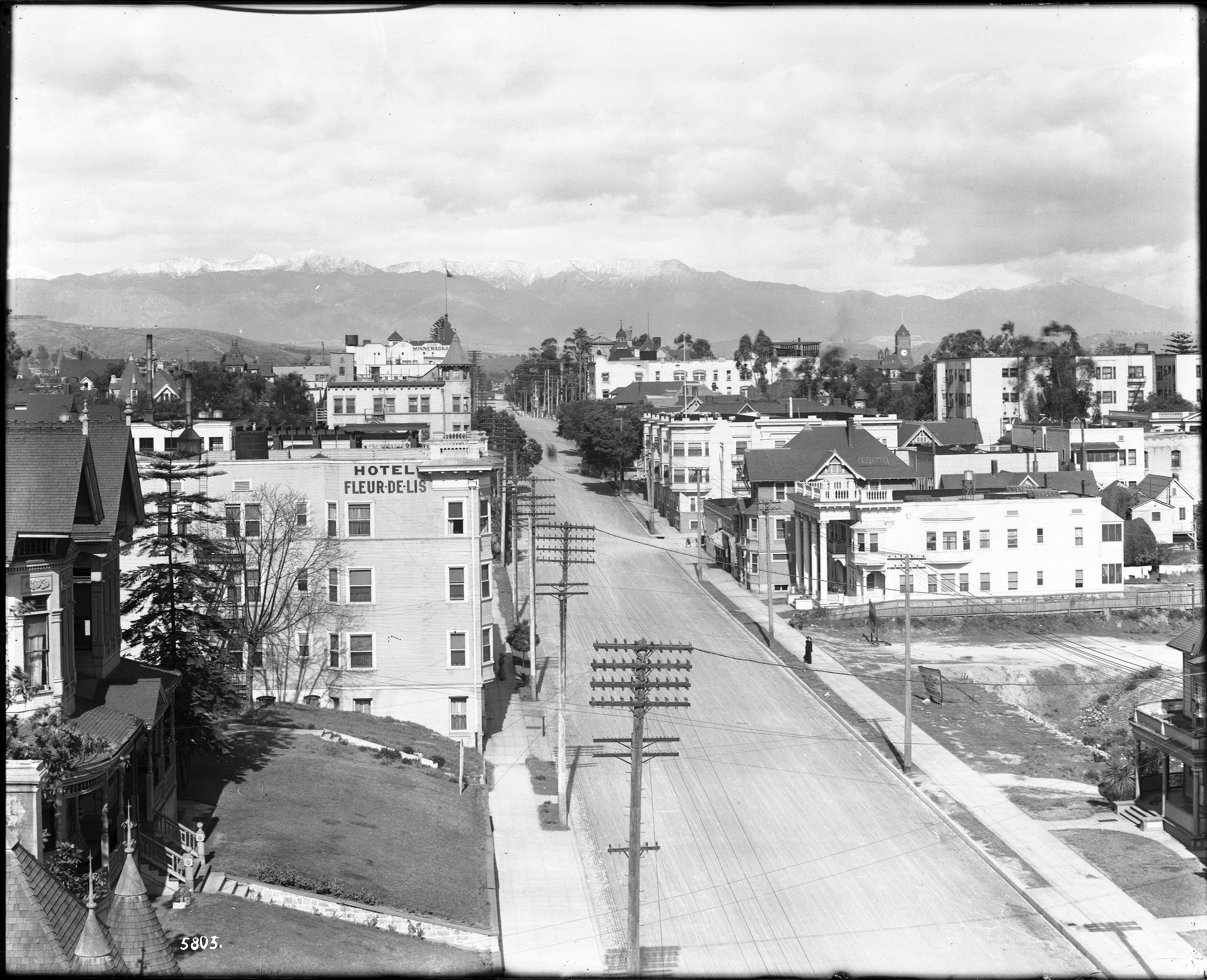
View of Grand Avenue looking northeast from 4th Street, Los Angeles, ca. 1913

Originally named Charity Street (or Calle de la Caridad in Spanish), Grand Avenue was renamed in 1887, due to the street's residents not wanting to live "on charity". During this time, the avenue was home to many mansions and hotels, with most of the mansions converted into rooming houses or hotels in the early the 20th century.

In the 1950s, much of Grand Avenue was converted from residential to a financial district. As stated in the New York Times, “first conceived in the 1950s by downtown power brokers like Buffy Chandler, the wife of Norman Chandler, who was then the publisher of The Los Angeles Times, the avenue was intended as a citadel of office towers and cultural monuments at the top of Bunker Hill.” In order to do this, neighborhoods were bulldozed down, replaced by skyscrapers, freeway ramps, tunnels, parking lots, underground roadways, and streets.

In 1966, the Civic Center was built between Grand Avenue and Hill Street.

In 2001, the Grand Avenue Committee was created with the goal of "uniting the separate government entities that often were at odds — the City and the County of Los Angeles — by bringing their representatives together in a joint powers authority focused on just one issue – reimagining Grand Avenue." In 2005, Frank Gehry was hired to design an entertainment area and shopping complex, and this along with the Walt Disney Concert Hall were critical to the avenue's success.

In 2022, the Grand Avenue Project was completed, further developing the avenue.

The Los Angeles Dodgers 2024 World Series championship parade was held down Grand Avenue. An estimated 225,000 fans attended the event.

== Landmarks ==
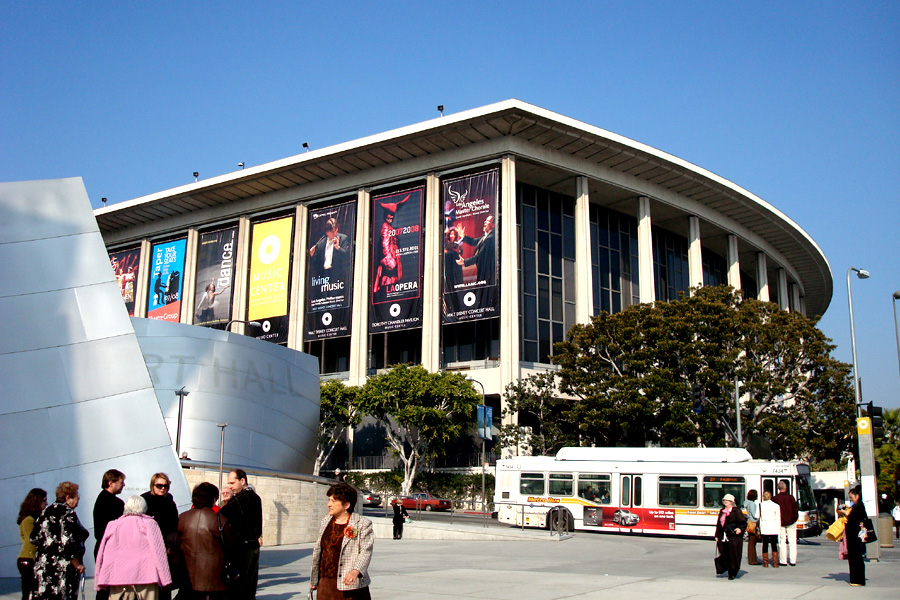
Los Angeles Music Center

The Los Angeles Music Center, located on the corner of Grand Avenue and 1st Street is a performance arts complex that houses the Ahmanson Theatre, Dorothy Chandler Pavilion, Mark Taper Forum, REDCAT, and Walt Disney Concert Hall. The Walt Disney Concert Hall, famous for its steel focused design, was completed in 2003 and since then has paved the way for further developments in the area.

Grand Park is a three block park that connects the Music Center on Grand Avenue with City Hall on Spring Street. The park's redevelopment was a major part of the Grand Avenue Development Project. Grand Hope Park, the final landscape along the Los Angeles Open Space Network, is also located on Grand Avenue.

Two museums are located on Grand Avenue: the Museum of Contemporary Art and The Broad. The Broad was built as part of the Grand Avenue Development Project.

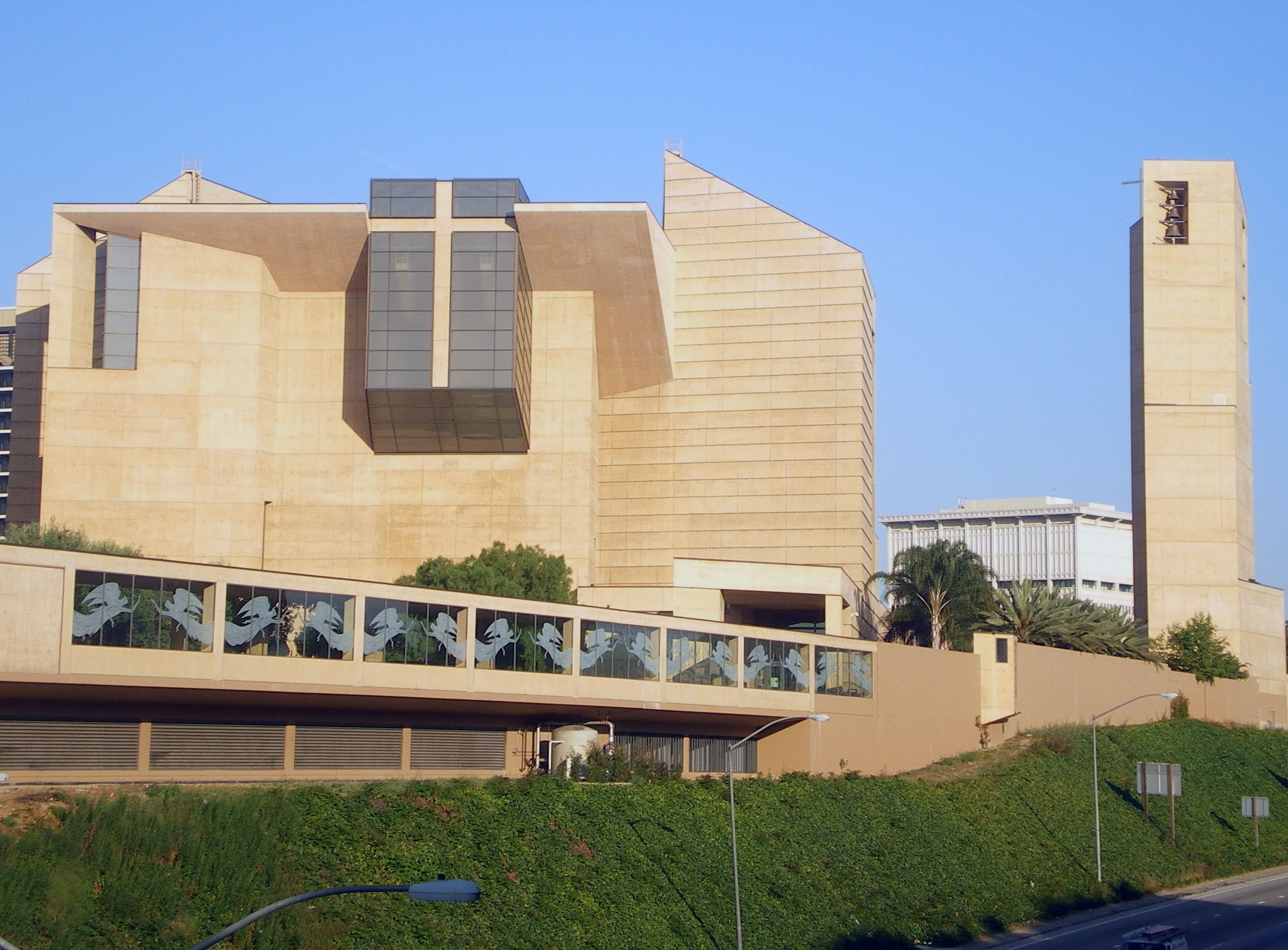
Cathedral of Our Lady of Angels

Cathedral of Our Lady of the Angels, the largest church in California and sixth largest in the United States, is located on the corner of Grand Avenue and Temple Street. Glory Church LA, the American English ministry of the Korean Glory Church, is also located on Grand Avenue, in the Grand Olympic Auditorium.

California Plaza is an outdoor plaza on Grand Avenue, next to One and Two California Plaza.

The Millennium Biltmore, the largest hotel in the United States west of Chicago when it opened, is located on Grand Avenue and 5th Street. Los Angeles Central Library and the Gas Company Tower also abut Grand Avenue at this intersection.

Several higher education campuses are located on Grand Avenue, including Colburn School, Los Angeles Trade–Technical College, Fashion Institute of Design & Merchandising, and Metropolitan Junior College. High schools on Grand Avenue include High School for the Visual and Performing Arts and Orthopaedic Hospital Medical Magnet.

Dignity Health's California Hospital Medical Center is located on Grand Avenue at 14th Street.

Other landmarks on or abutting Grand Avenue include the Wells Fargo Center, Kenneth Hahn Hall of Administration, Stanley Mosk Courthouse, One Wilshire, South Park Lofts, Trinity Auditorium, and the Los Angeles branch of the Federal Reserve Bank of San Francisco.

== Transportation ==
Transportation is provided by Los Angeles Metro, and includes an A Line station, A and E Line station, J Line stops, and bus lines 37, 38, 55, 70, 76, and 78.
