= Hill Street (Los Angeles) =

Street in Los Angeles, California, United States

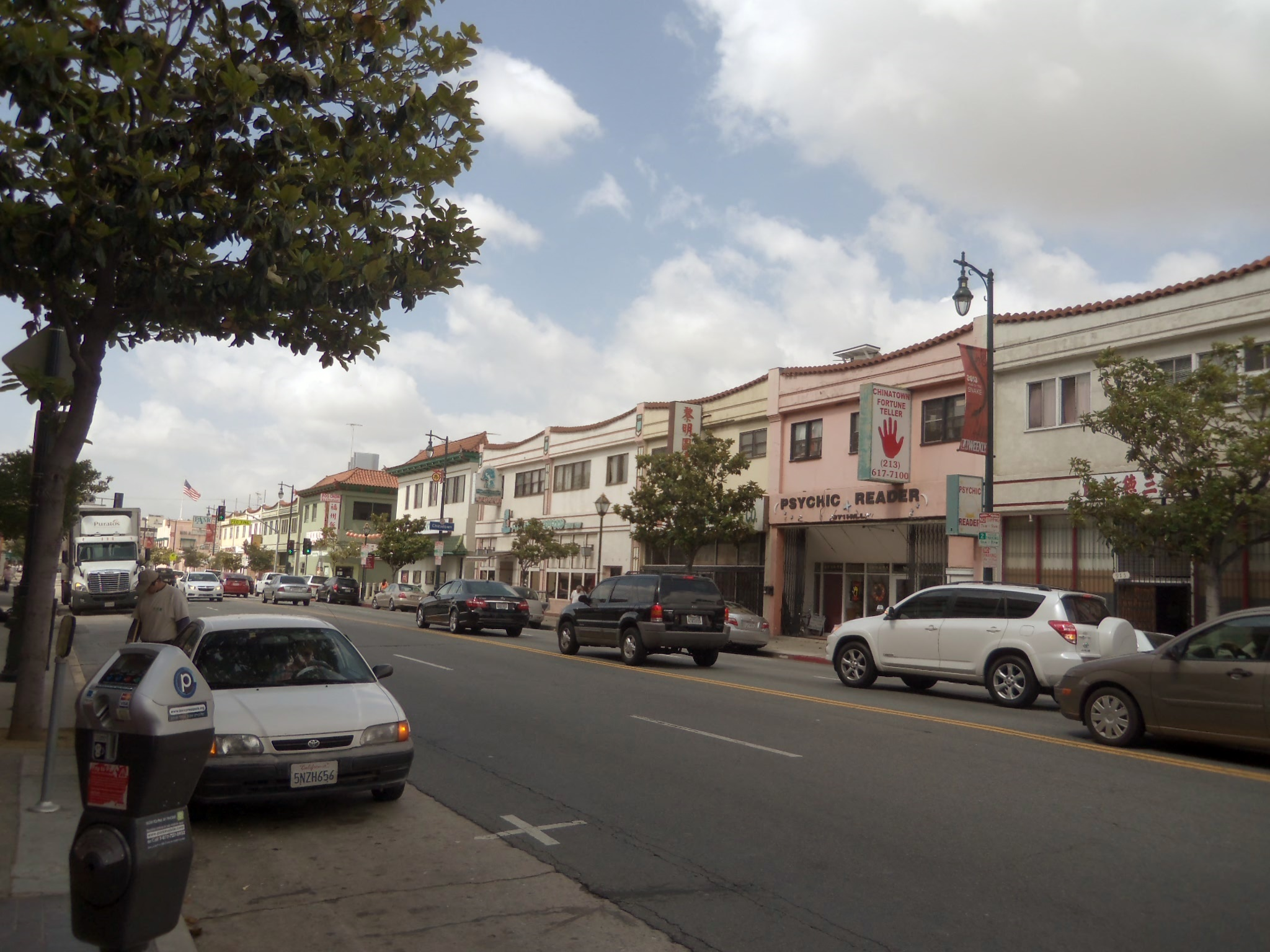
- North Hill Street in Chinatown
- Interactive map of Hill Street
- Maintained by: Los Angeles County Department of Public Works
- Length: 4.8 mi (7.7 km)
- Location: Los Angeles County, California, U.S.
- Nearest metro station: : Civic Center/Grand Park; Pershing Square
- South end: I-110 in Historic South-Central
- North end: SR 110 in Chinatown

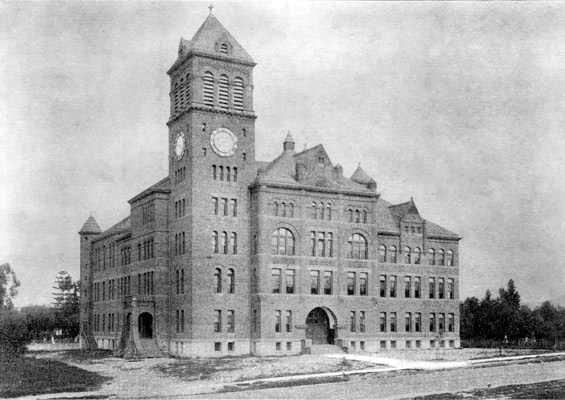
Los Angeles High School building opened 1891 (razed)

Hill Street is a major north–south thoroughfare in Los Angeles, measuring 4.8 miles (7.7 km) in length. It starts on Martin Luther King, Jr. Boulevard near the campus of USC, and passes north through Downtown Los Angeles, past such landmarks as Pershing Square, the Subway Terminal Building, Angels Flight, Fort Moore and Chinatown. Hill Street merges with the Arroyo Seco Parkway near Dodger Stadium.

== History ==
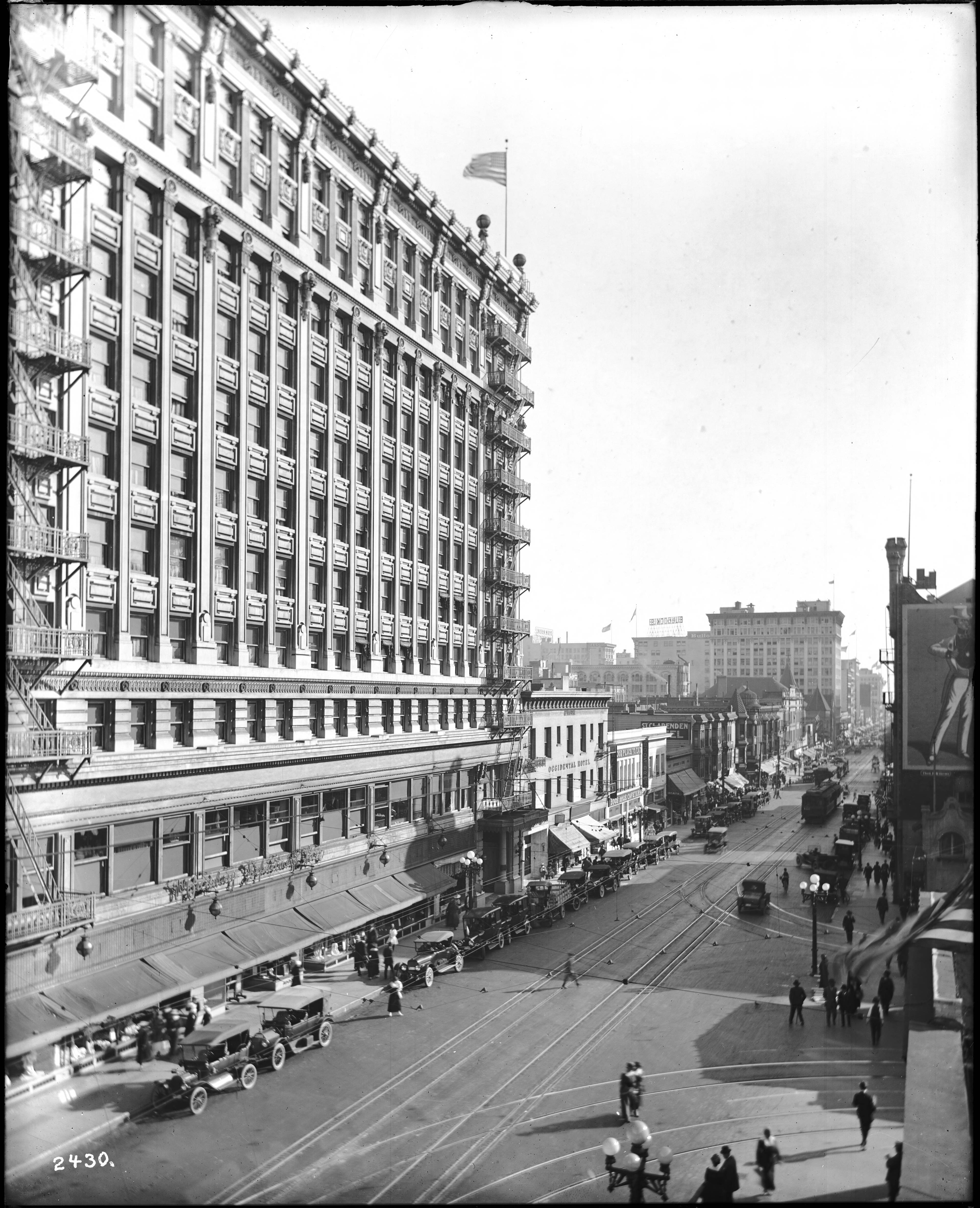
East side of Hill between 4th and 5th, 1910s. The large building is the back entrance to the Broadway Department Store. Pacific Electric and Los Angeles Railway dual gauge streetcar tracks are embedded in the road.

Hill Street was originally laid out in 1849 by Edward Ord. At that time, the street ended in the north at 1st Street, where the foot of Fort Hill sat. The stretch of modern Hill Street north of the old hill was originally named Calle del Toro (Bull Street), was renamed Castelar in 1874, and finally renamed North Hill in 1960.

== Transportation ==
The Metro B Line and Metro D Line run underneath Hill Street between 1st Street and 4th Street and operate the Civic Center and Pershing Square stations along the way. Metro Local lines 2, 4, 10, 28, 81, and 94 run along the surface. The Angels Flight funicular climbs west up Bunker Hill from Hill between 3rd and 4th streets.

Between 1909 and 1955, Hill Street Tunnel carried both local rail and automotive traffic under the eponymous hill. It was largely demolished when the hill was removed.

== Education ==
Number of schools are located at or nearby Hill Street. They include Cathedral High School, Castelar Elementary School, High School for the Visual and Performing Arts, Evans Community Adult School, the William Jefferson Clinton Middle School, Orthopaedic Hospital Medical Magnet High School, Santee Education Complex, and Los Angeles Trade-Tech College.

Los Angeles Public Library has the Chinatown branch located at Hill and Ord Streets.

== Landmarks ==
North of US 101

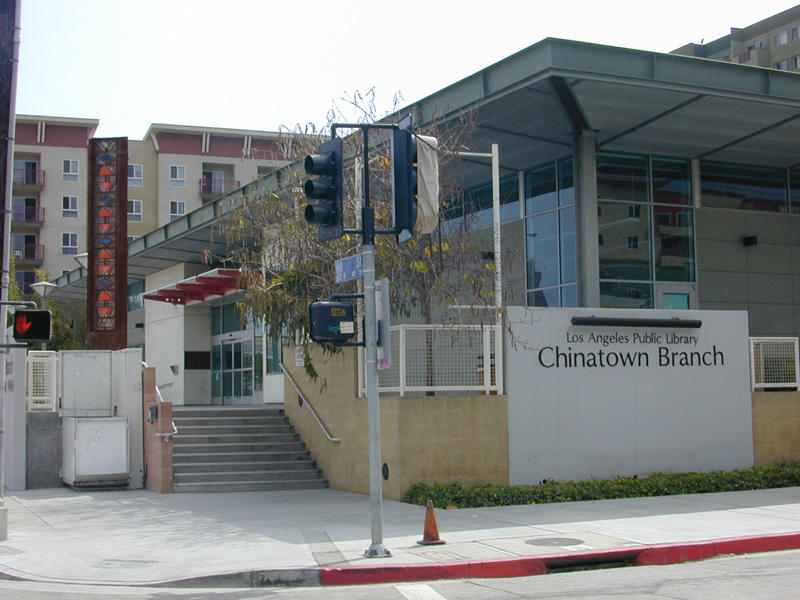
Chinatown Branch Library at the corner of Hill Street and Ord Street, 2008

- Chinatown Branch Library, Hill and Ord streets
- Chinatown West Gate (1938)
- Ramón C. Cortines School of Visual and Performing Arts (back side)
- Fort Moore Pioneer Memorial (451 N. Hill)
- Site of Los Angeles High School building (1891, razed)

Civic Center

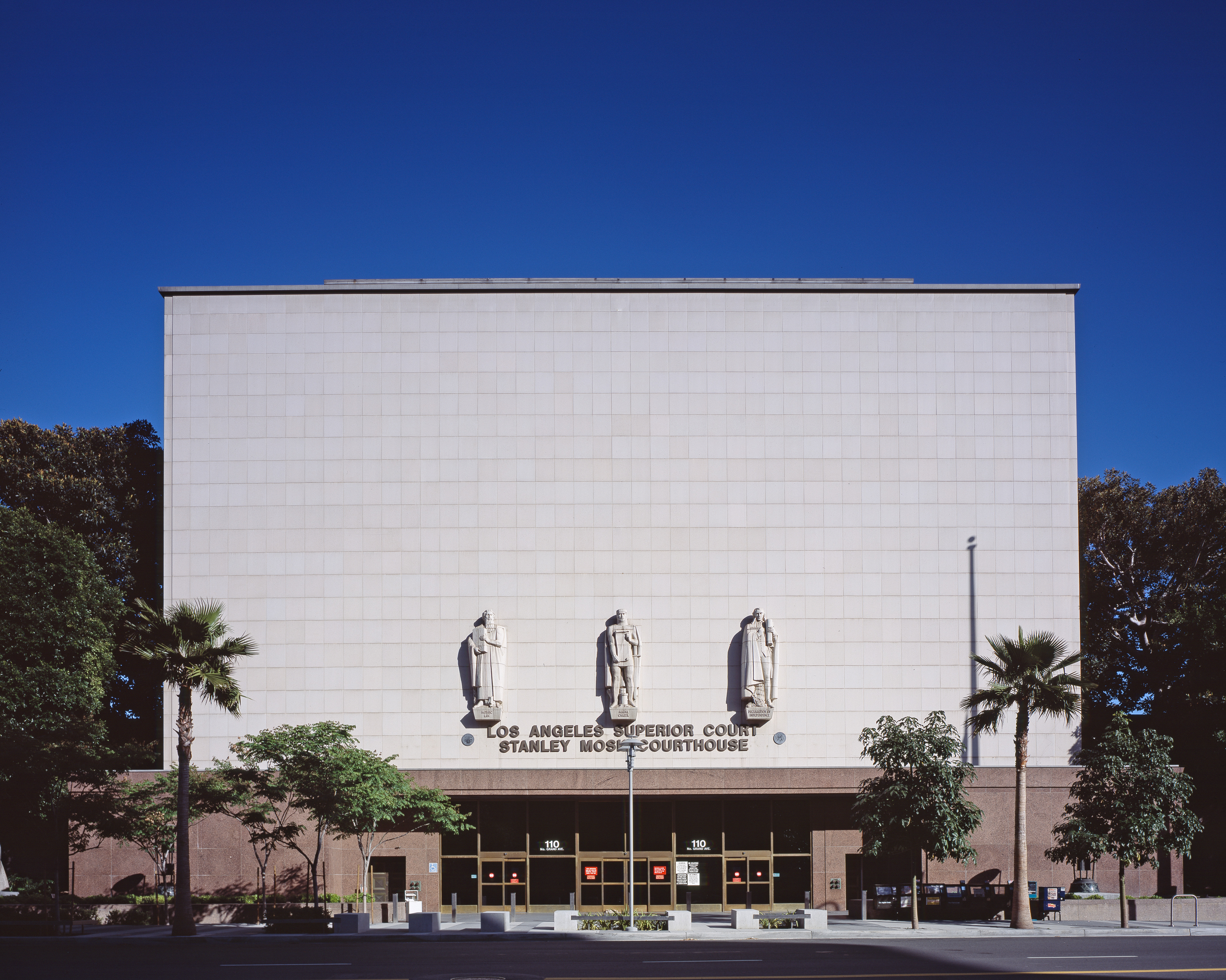
Stanley Mosk Courthouse at 1st Street, 2010

- Cathedral of Our Lady of the Angels (2002, Rafael Moneo, Modern architecture with deconstructivist elements)
- Kenneth Hahn Hall of Administration (1960, Stanton, Stockwell, Williams and Wilson, Late Moderne architecture)
- Los Angeles County Hall of Records (1962)
- Grand Park
- Stanley Mosk Courthouse (1958, Stanton, Stockwell, Williams and Wilson, Late Moderne architecture)
- United States Courthouse (First Street, Los Angeles), opened 2016, built on the site of the demolished First Junipero Serra State Office Building (Stanton & Stockwell, 1960)

Third to Fourth streets

- Angels Flight
- Grand Central Market

Fourth to Fifth streets

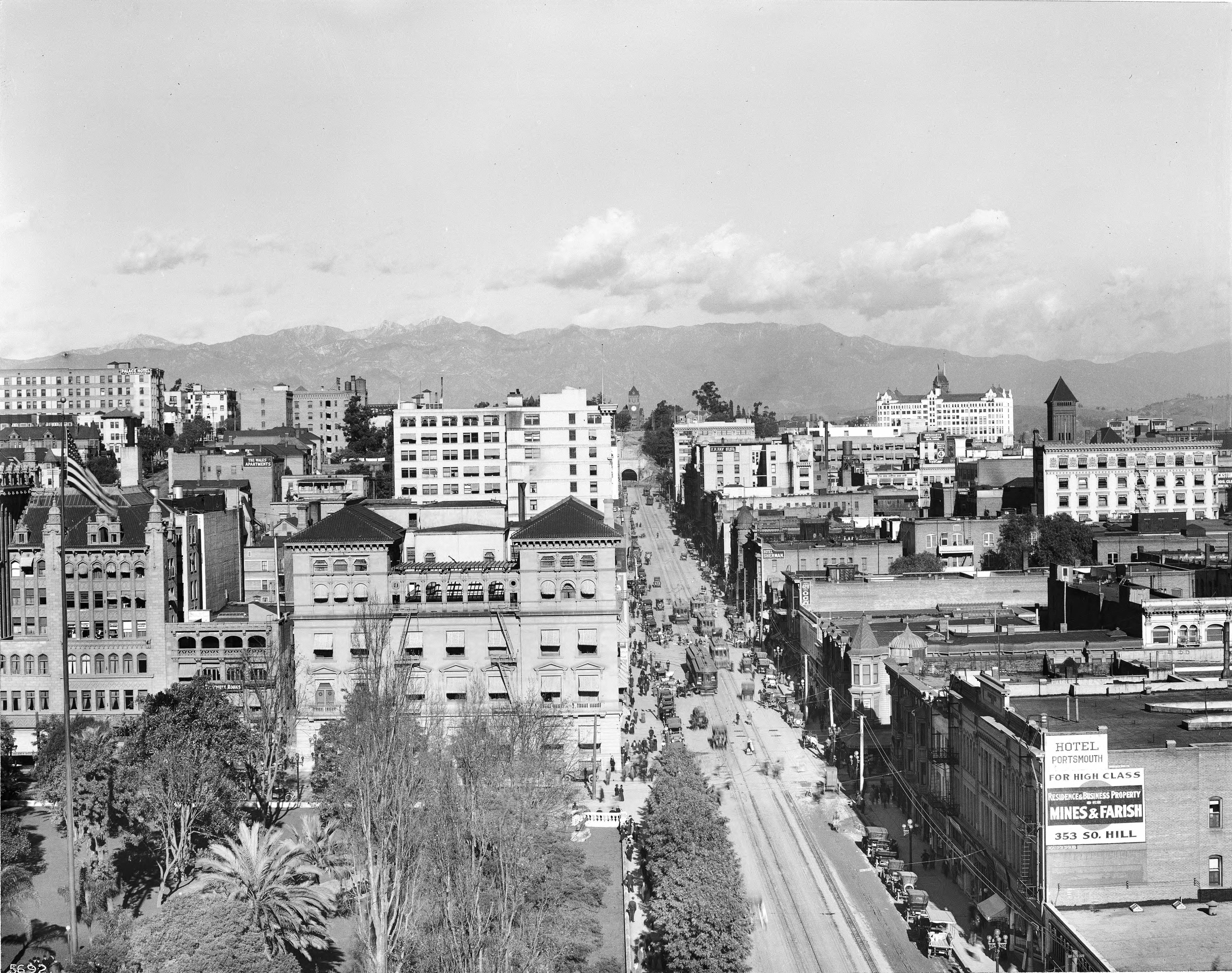
Hill Street, looking north from 6th Street, around 1913. Notable sites include Central Park (today's Pershing Square) (the trees, lower left), Hotel Portsmouth (lower right), and the Hill Street Tunnel (at end of street).

- Former Broadway Department Store (back side), now Junipero Serra State Office Building (#2)
- Subway Terminal Building, now Metro 417 residential
- Title Guarantee and Trust Company Building (1930)

Fifth to Sixth streets

- Pershing Square
- Pershing Square station
- Site of Paramount Theatre, now International Jewelry Center

Sixth to Seventh streets

- Consolidated Reatly Bldg./California Jewelry Mart (1908/1935)
- Sun Realty Bldg./Los Angeles Jewelry Center (1931)
- Harris & Frank Bldg./Wholesale Jewelry Exchange (1925)
- Western Jewelry Mart
- William Fox Bldg. (Fox Jewelry Plaza) (1932)
- former Warner Bros. (a.k.a. Pantages, Warren) Theatre (movie palace, 1920), now Downtown Jewelry Exchange
- Bullock's complex (back entrance), now St. Vincent Jewelry Center

Seventh to Eighth streets

- Foreman & Clark department store building (site, 1928)
- Garfield Building (1930)
- Union Bank and Trust Company building (1922), now Union Lofts

Eighth to Ninth streets

- Site of the RKO Hillstreet Theatre (1922–1963), now 820 Olive (residential)
- Coast Federal Savings Building (1926)

Ninth St. to Olympic Blvd.

- May Company Garage - 1926 - one of the Nation's first parking structures (Los Angeles Historic-Cultural Monument No. 1001)
- South Park by Windsor Apts.

South of Olympic Blvd.

- The Mayan
- Site of Belasco Theatre
- White Log Coffee Shop
- John Adams Middle School (151 W. 30th St.)
