= Park 101 =

Proposed park in downtown Los Angeles

Coordinates: 34.055647°N 118.240272°W

Park 101 is a proposed linear park on a freeway cap over the Downtown Slot on U.S. Route 101 in downtown Los Angeles, California, US. The Los Angeles Times has compared the park to Central Park, Millennium Park, and the National Mall.

== Location ==
Park 101 would be on a freeway cap above the Downtown Slot, a portion of U.S. Route 101 that runs for 0.25 miles (0.40 km) through Fort Moore Hill via an artificial canyon in downtown Los Angeles, California. The slot separates the Civic Center from El Pueblo de Los Angeles.

== History ==
The Downtown Slot began construct in 1949 and opened as part of the original 10-mile (16 km) Hollywood Freeway in 1954.

Park 101 was originally proposed as a 10-acre (40,000 m^{2}), 0.5-mile (0.80 km) long linear park located on a freeway cap over U.S. 101 between Grand Avenue and the Los Angeles River in downtown Los Angeles, was first conceived by Nick Patsaouras in the mid-1990s. It was re-conceived with a shorter length (between Grand Avenue and east of Alameda Street) in 2008 and presented as a temporary exhibit at the Caltrans museum the following year. The purpose of the park, in addition to adding greenspace to downtown Los Angeles, is to reconnect several destinations currently divided by US 101, including City Hall, the Civic Center, Union Station, Chinatown, and El Pueblo de Los Ángeles. Several new buildings were also proposed in the re-conceived project, most notably a skyscraper that if built would be the tallest building on the west coast of the United States. The Los Angeles Times compared the re-conceived project to Central Park in New York City, Millennium Park in Chicago, and the National Mall in Washington D.C.. Its estimated cost was $800 million ($1.2 billion in 2025).

In 2013, Los Angeles City Council agreed to partner with the non-profit Friends of Park 101 to search for funding for the project. In 2017, park supporters released a scaled back proposal consisting of four capped blocks between Grand Avenue and Los Angeles Street. The proposal also recommends closing several freeway on and off-ramps and developing six city and county owned sites near the park to help fund park maintenance. The estimated cost of this proposal was $180 million ($236 million in 2025).
