= Civic Center, Los Angeles =

Civic Center
- Neighborhood
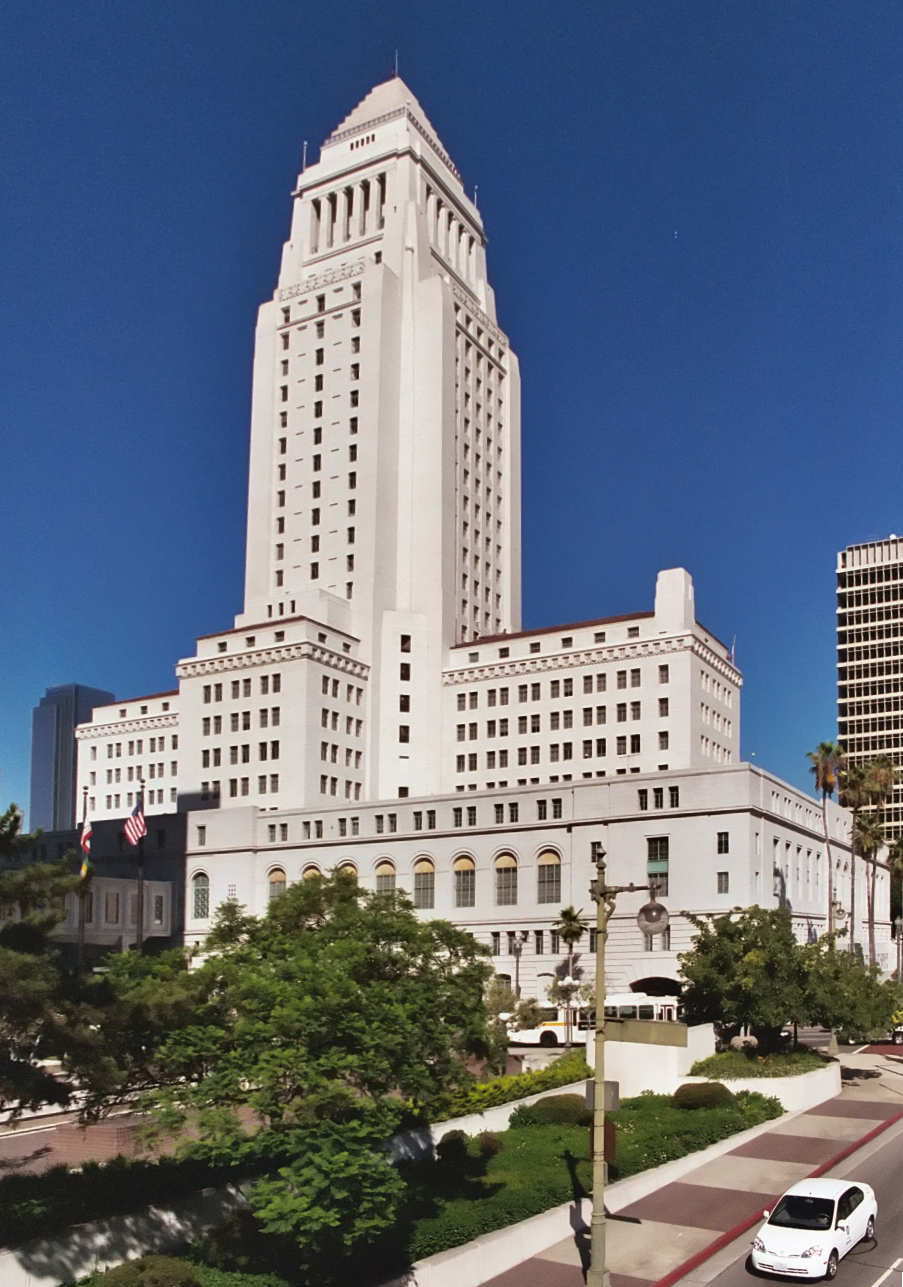
- Los Angeles City Hall stands at the southern border of the Los Angeles Civic Center

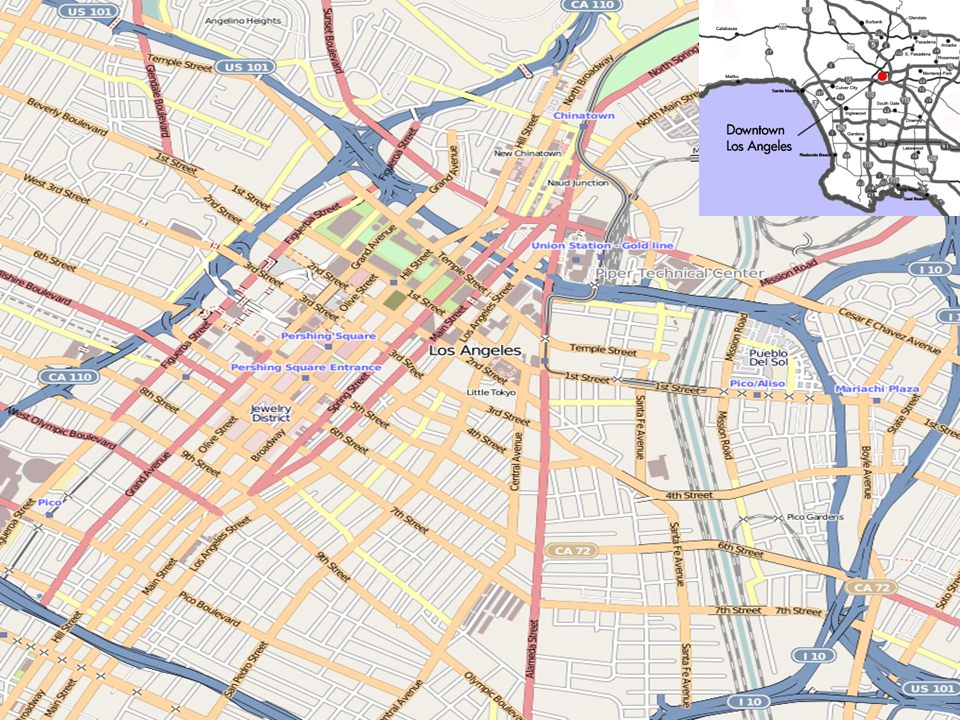
- Location within Downtown Los Angeles
- Coordinates: 34.054139°N 118.244659°W
- Country: United States
- State: California
- County: Los Angeles
- City: Los Angeles
- Area code: 213

The Civic Center district of Downtown Los Angeles, Los Angeles, California, is the administrative core of the City of Los Angeles, County of Los Angeles, and a complex of city, county, state, and federal government offices, buildings, and courthouses. It is located on the site of the former business district of the city during the 1880s and 1890s, since mostly-demolished.

== Location ==
The Civic Center is located in the northern part of Downtown Los Angeles, bordering Bunker Hill, Little Tokyo, Chinatown, and the Historic Core of the old Downtown. Depending on various district definitions, either the Civic Center or Bunker Hill also contains the Music Center and adjacent Walt Disney Concert Hall; some maps, for example, place the Dorothy Chandler Pavilion in the Civic Center but the Disney Concert Hall in Bunker Hill.

The Civic Center has the distinction of containing the largest concentration of government employees in the United States outside of Washington, D.C. The reason for the high concentration is simple: Los Angeles is the most populous county in the United States and its second largest city, and houses several state and federal functions for the region.

=== Other locations ===
Los Angeles' 1949 master plan called for branch administrative centers throughout the rapidly expanding city. In addition to the main civic center downtown, there is the West Los Angeles Civic Center in the Westside (built between 1957 and 1965) and the Van Nuys Civic Center (1932) in the San Fernando Valley, as well as a neighborhood city hall in San Pedro (1928).

== Transportation ==
The Regional Connector that opened on June 16, 2023, serves this area with two stations at Grand Avenue Arts/Bunker Hill station and Historic Broadway.

== History and planning ==
Part of what is now the Civic Center occupies what was the central business district (CBD) of the 1880s and 1890s, which was first centered at the southern end of the Los Angeles Plaza and grew to the south and west along Main Street, Spring Street and Broadway, with Third & Broadway forming its southwestern anchor by the mid-1890s. As upscale businesses moved further south into the Historic Core around 1900–1910, the Victorian-era blocks became the "north end" of the business district and became increasingly neglected.

There were numerous grand plans for a coherent, modern civic center. Charles Mulford Robinson's 1909 plan focused on only a few major buildings between Main, Broadway, First and Temple. Lyman Farewell, Cook and Hall, the Allied Architects Association, the Regional Planning Commission, Frank Lloyd Wright, William Lee Woollett, Stanton & Stockwell, and landscape architect Ralph Cornell all contributed plans or partial plans, through the late 1950s. There was a "Mulholland Committee" to adopt one, and the location was put to the public for a vote in the late 1920s. The public voted overwhelmingly to confirm the location, but the city and county differed on which plan to adopt. There was later a Civic Center Advisory Committee and then in 1945, a Los Angeles Civic Center Authority. But never was a single plan adopted. Nonetheless, construction of the various buildings proceeded one by one, starting with the City Hall and the Hall of Justice in the 1920s, and the California State Building (already demolished) in 1931.

One of these plans which was not adopted in its entirety, the 1947 Civic Center Master Plan, nonetheless envisioned the demolition of the once-tony residential area Bunker Hill, which happened in the 1950s and allowed the Civic Center to expand westward across the northern section of that neighborhood (from Temple south to Second St.). The plan also conceived two County buildings: Stanley Mosk Courthouse completed in 1958, the Kenneth Hahn Hall of Administration opening in 1960, designed by Stanton, Stockwell, Williams and Wilson in Late Moderne style, flanking either side of a new pedestrian mall, Civic Center Mall, now part of Grand Park. A new Los Angeles County Hall of Records arose nearby in 1962. The 1955, Parker Center, headquarters for the Los Angeles Police Department until 2009, opened on the east side of Los Angeles Street, pushing the civic district's eastern boundary to Alameda Street, establishing the current Civic Center footprint such that now nearly the entire area between Hope and Los Angeles streets, US-101, and Second Street, consists of civic buildings - the single large exception being the city block called Times Mirror Square, former headquarters of the Los Angeles Times newspaper.

As part of the Grand Avenue Project, Grand Park was created in 2012, encompassing the former Civic Center Mall and additional areas such that it now stretches from the Los Angeles Music Center complex to City Hall.

Now, the city looks to bring pedestrian life into the area. In March 2017, the Los Angeles City Council approved a new Civic Center Master Plan (CCMP). It details a full build out around city hall by the year 2032, specifically the east facing front. The CCMP schedules for a full tear down of Parker Center (torn down in 2019), L.A. City Hall's "south" building, and the Los Angeles Mall. The CCMP is to connect City Hall in a pedestrian-friendly way with its surrounding neighborhood and Little Tokyo. The CCMP calls for active ground-floor uses, to stimulate the pedestrian traffic that the Civic Center currently lacks. Four new government and office towers are described in the plan as well as the planned Park 101 recreational area. A design approach idea to cover U.S. Highway 101 as a trench with green space above. Connecting with Union Station and Olvera Street.

== Buildings and landmarks ==
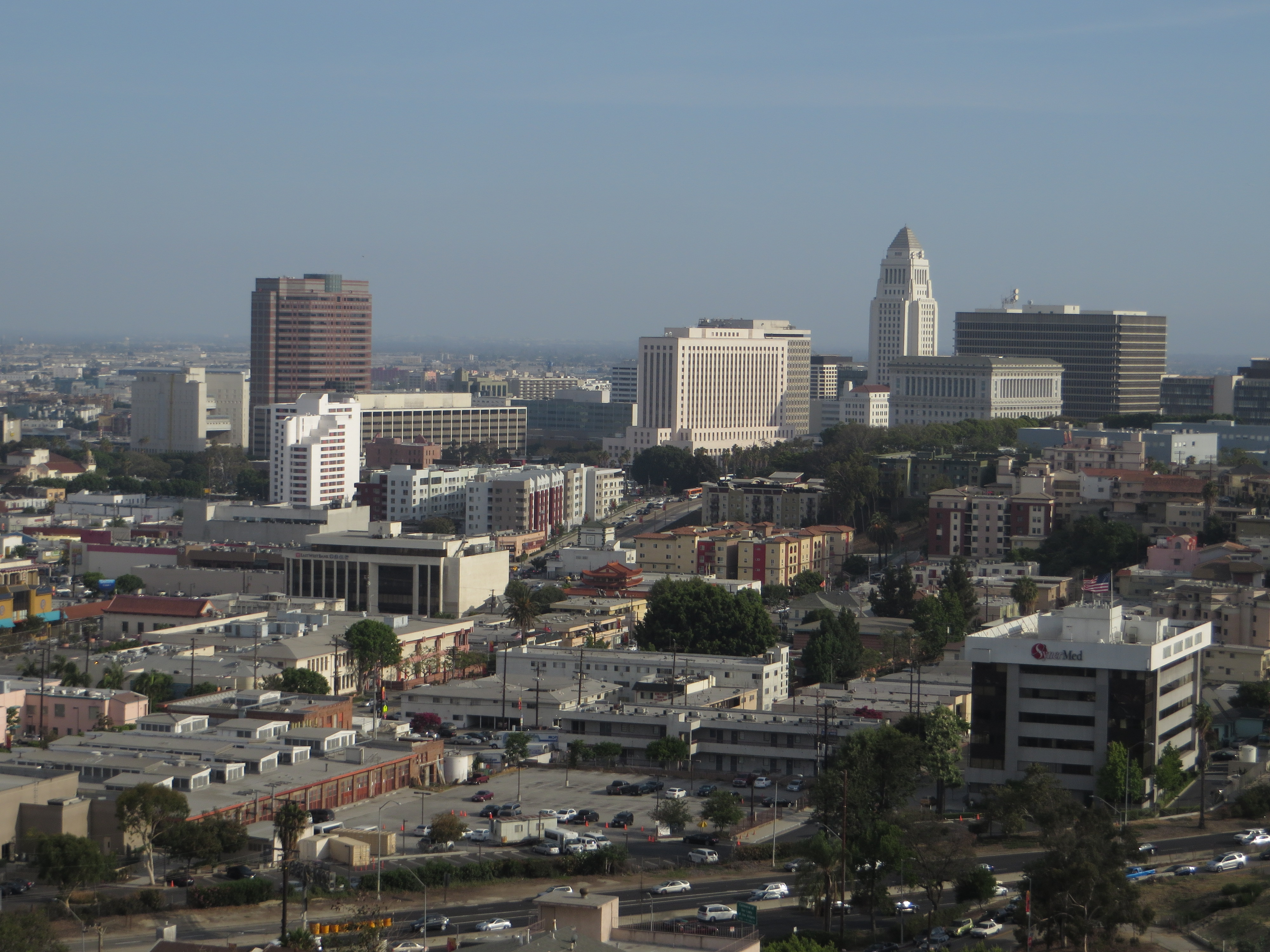
View of the Civic Center from Dodger Stadium.

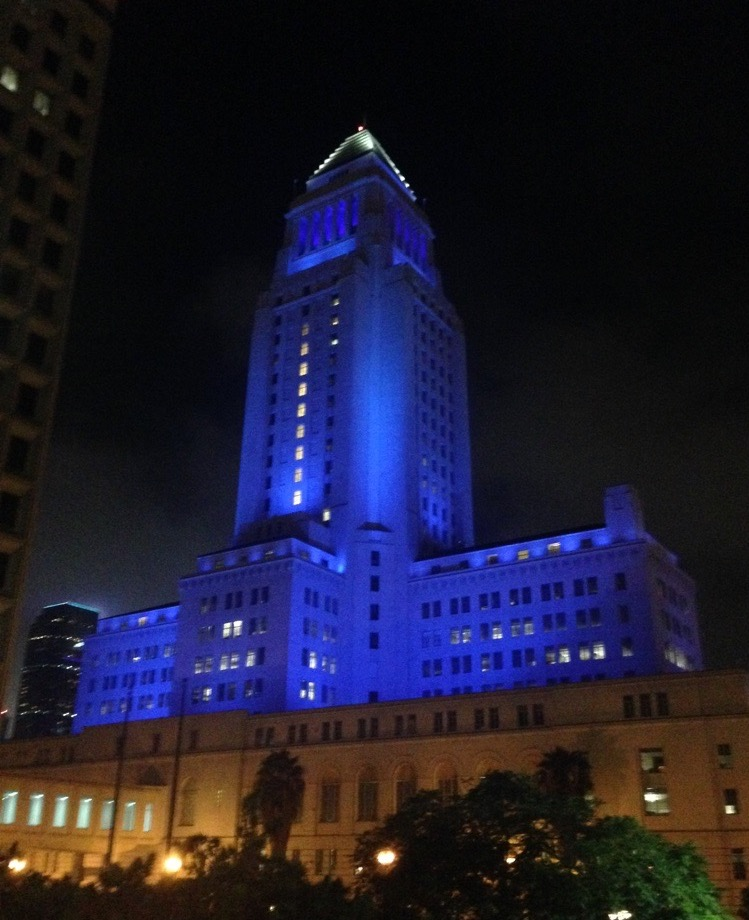
City Hall is often lit with various colors at night.

- Grand Park traverses an east–west axis from Hope to Spring streets.

West side of Figueroa between Temple and First:

- County depts. of Public Health and Health Services
- Figueroa Plaza, various city departments

Between Figueroa and Hope:

- John Ferraro Building housing the Los Angeles Department of Water and Power (DWP)

Between Hope and Grand:

- Ahmanson Theatre and Mark Taper Forum (1967)
- Dorothy Chandler Pavilion and Los Angeles Music Center (1964)
- Walt Disney Concert Hall

Between Grand and Hill:

- Cathedral of Our Lady of the Angels (2002, Rafael Moneo, Modern architecture with deconstructivist elements)
- Stanley Mosk Courthouse (1958, Stanton, Stockwell, Williams and Wilson, Late Moderne architecture)
- Kenneth Hahn Hall of Administration (1960, Stanton, Stockwell, Williams and Wilson, Late Moderne architecture)

Between Hill and Broadway:

- Los Angeles County Hall of Records (1962)
- United States Courthouse (2016), built on the site of the demolished First Junipero Serra State Office Building (Stanton & Stockwell, 1960)

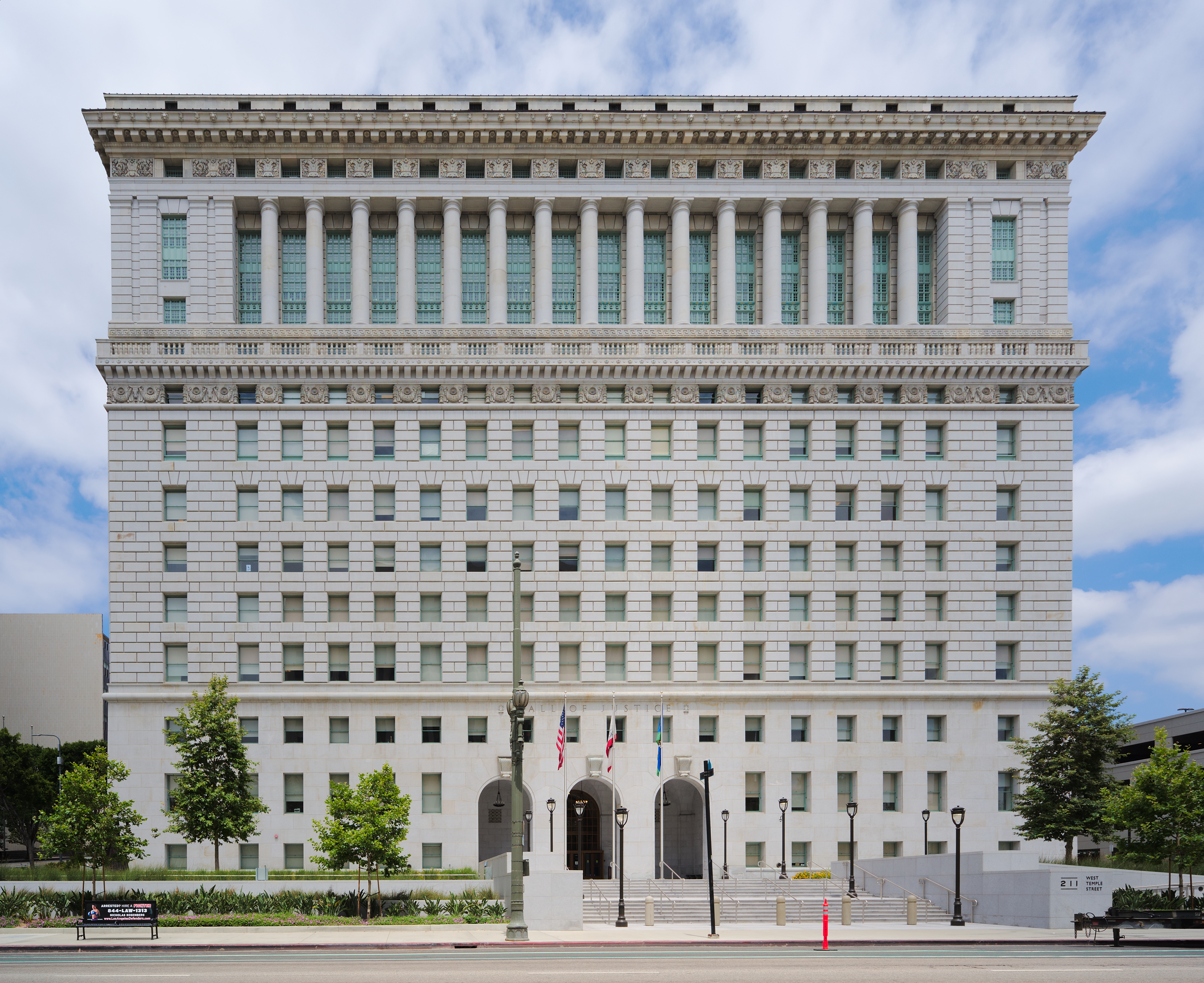
The Hall of Justice

Between Broadway and Spring:

- The Hall of Justice (1925)
- Site of California State Building (1931-1976, vacant)
- Law Library
- Clara Shortridge Foltz Criminal Justice Center (1972)

Between Spring and Main:

- Spring St. U.S. Court House (1940)
- Los Angeles City Hall (1928)
- Los Angeles Police Department Headquarters (2009)

Between Main and Los Angeles St.:

- Los Angeles Mall (Stanton & Stockwell, 1974)
  - City Hall East
  - Triforium
- City Hall South
- Caltrans District 7 Headquarters

Between Los Angeles St. and Alameda:

- Los Angeles Federal Building (1965, architect Welton Becket)
- Edward R. Roybal Federal Building
- Alameda Street Detention Facility
- Parker Center (1955, former police HQ, vacant)

== County representation ==
The Los Angeles County Department of Health Services operates the Central Health Center in Downtown Los Angeles, serving the Civic Center.

== See also ==
- Victorian Downtown Los Angeles
