= California State Building =

California State Building may signify:

- California State Building (Los Angeles)
- California State Building (Santa Ana)
- California State Office Building No. 1 (Jesse Unruh Office Building), 915 Capitol Mall in Sacramento
- California State Building at the Civic Center, San Francisco
