= Kenneth Hahn Hall of Administration =

Seat of government for Los Angeles County, California

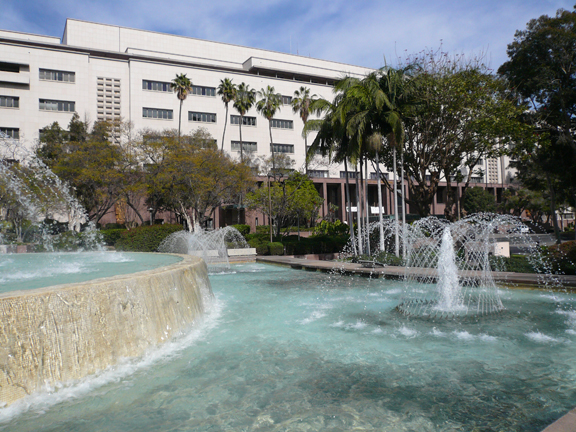
- Interactive map of the Kenneth Hahn Hall of Administration area
- Former names: Los Angeles County Hall of Administration

General information
- Type: Government offices
- Location: 500 W. Temple Street; Los Angeles, California, United States
- Coordinates: 34.056864°N 118.245995°W
- Construction started: 1952
- Completed: 1960
- Owner: County of Los Angeles
- Management: County of Los Angeles

Technical details
- Floor count: 10
- Floor area: 980,000 square feet (91,000 m^{2})

Design and construction
- Architects: Paul R. Williams, Adrian Wilson, Austin, Field & Fry, Stanton & Stockwell

Kenneth Hahn Hall of Administration (abbreviated HOA), formerly the Los Angeles County Hall of Administration, completed 1960, is the seat of the government of the County of Los Angeles, California, United States. The seat houses the Los Angeles County Board of Supervisors, meeting chambers, and the offices of several County departments. It is located in the Civic Center district of downtown Los Angeles, encompassing a city block bounded by Grand, Temple, Hill, and Grand Park.

On an average workday, 2,700 civil servants occupy the building.

== History ==
The Hall of Administration was originally conceived as part of the 1947 Civic Center Master Plan that ultimately transformed Bunker Hill, as the Civic Center expanded westward. Los Angeles County Courthouse (Stanley Mosk Courthouse), located opposite of the Hall of Administration, built at the same time, was designed by the same team of architects.

Construction for the Hall of Administration began in 1952 and was completed in 1960. Prior to its construction, Los Angeles County Hall of Records (originally built in 1911, and rebuilt in 1961) housed the Board of Supervisors, as well as other county government entities.

The complex was renamed the Kenneth Hahn Hall of Administration in 1992, in honor of Los Angeles County's longest serving Supervisor, Kenneth Hahn.

== Architecture ==
The Hall of Administration, a 10-story, 980,000 square feet (91,000 m^{2}) complex, is built in the Late Moderne architecture style. The complex was designed by architects Paul R. Williams, Adrian Wilson and the firms Austin, Field & Fry, Stanton & Stockwell. The Hall of Administration sits atop a complex of underground pedestrian tunnels that connect it to other government buildings in Civic Center.

The complex features integrated public art displays, including a pair of sculptures called "The Law Givers," by Albert Stewart, a sculptor. On the second floor lobby stands a bronze bust of Abraham Lincoln, sculpted by Emil Seletz in 1958.

== See also ==
- Civic Center, Los Angeles
- Grand Park
