= Bullock's Pasadena =

- Bullocks Pasadena
- U.S. National Register of Historic Places
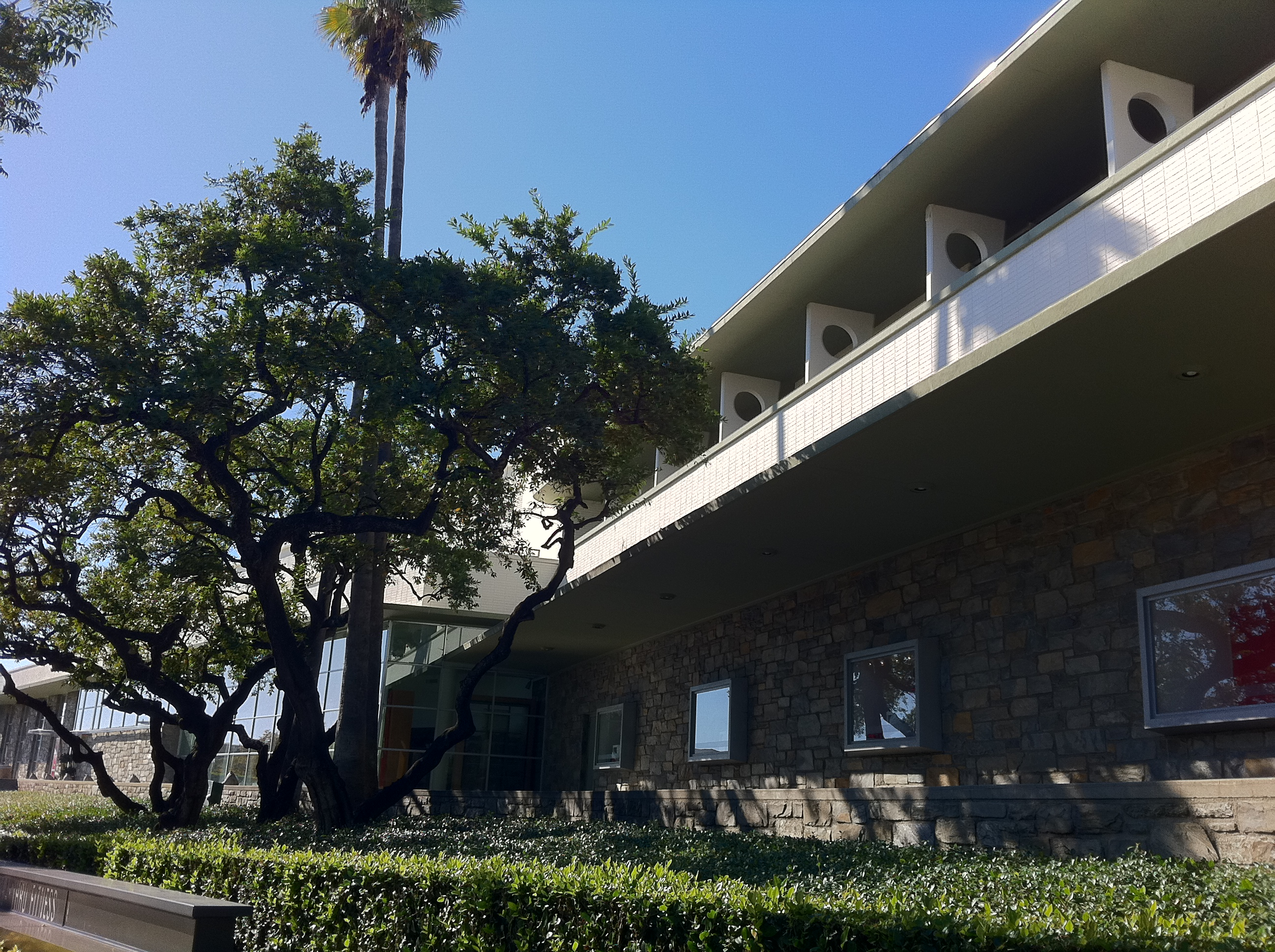
- Bullock's Pasadena from the street
- Location: 401 S. Lake Ave. Pasadena, California, United States
- Coordinates: 34.139133°N 118.133058°W
- Built: 1947
- Architect: Wurdeman and Becket
- Architectural style: Late Moderne
- NRHP reference No.: 96000776
- Added to NRHP: July 12, 1996

Bullock's Pasadena, in Pasadena, California, is a 240,000-square foot (21 368 m²) Late Moderne architectural style building. Built in 1947, it is listed on the National Register of Historic Places.

== History ==
=== Design ===
The building was designed by noted Los Angeles architects Wurdeman & Becket, a partnership between Welton Becket and Walter Wurdemen. In addition to the building itself, the architects oversaw the design and installation of all aspects of the store's interior, from the wallpaper and display cases, to the unique mechanical conveyor system that delivered purchases directly to the parking lot.

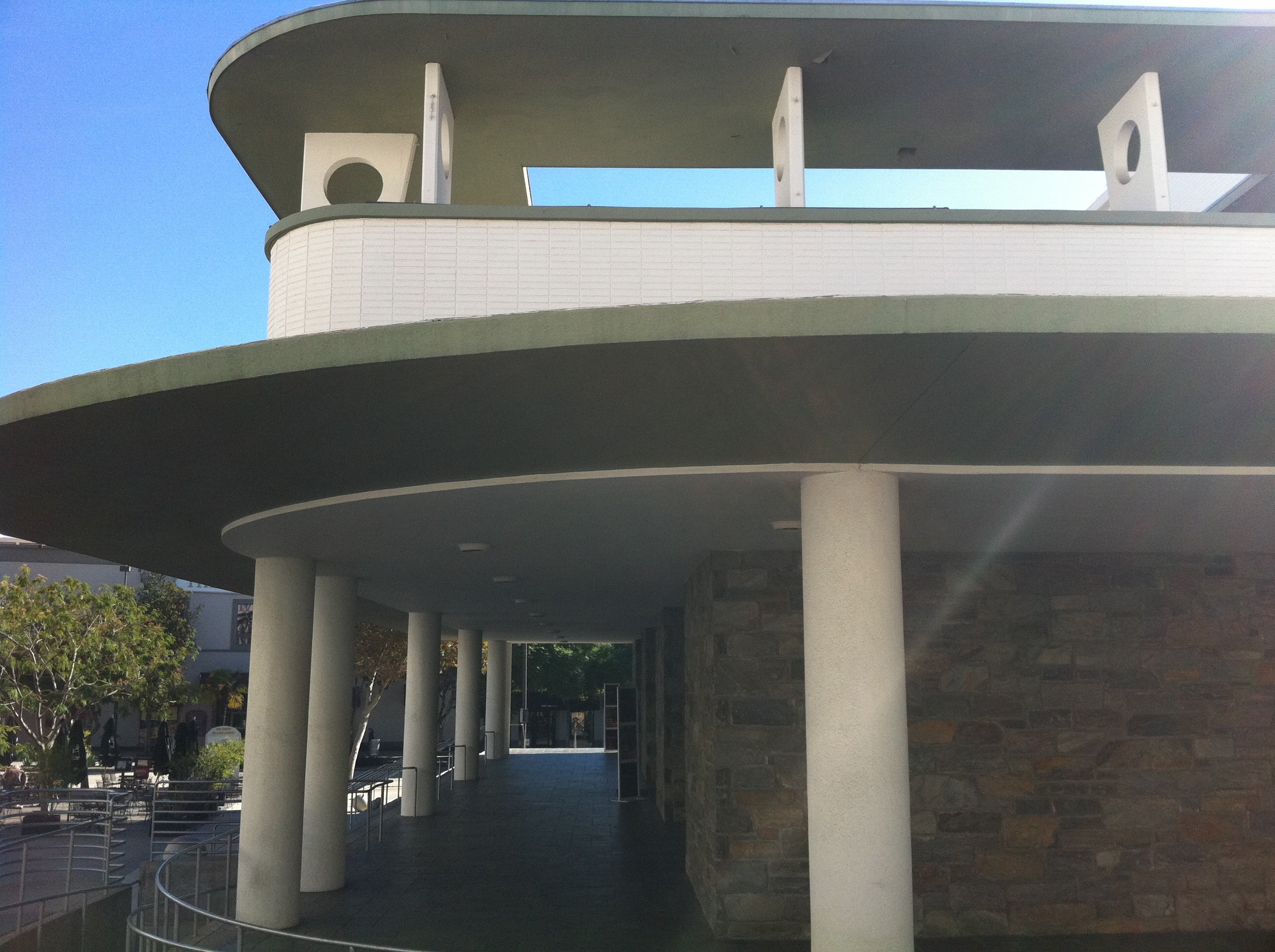
Bullock's Pasadena, looking east

This attention to detail reflected the architect's philosophy of "total design," or taking responsibility for master planning, engineering, interiors, fixtures and furnishings, landscape, signage and graphics. The department store was purposely crafted to evoke an atmosphere of a "home" or that of an exclusive country club, in keeping with the company president's vision.

The design and merchandising of store were unique and stood in contrast to many older department stores of the time. Bullock's Pasadena was among the first department stores in the country to be located outside of a downtown area and was intended to appeal to the emerging "carriage trade," or those shoppers arriving by automobiles. As such, the store was oriented toward an unheard of 6-acre (24,000 m^{2}) parking lot located behind the structure.

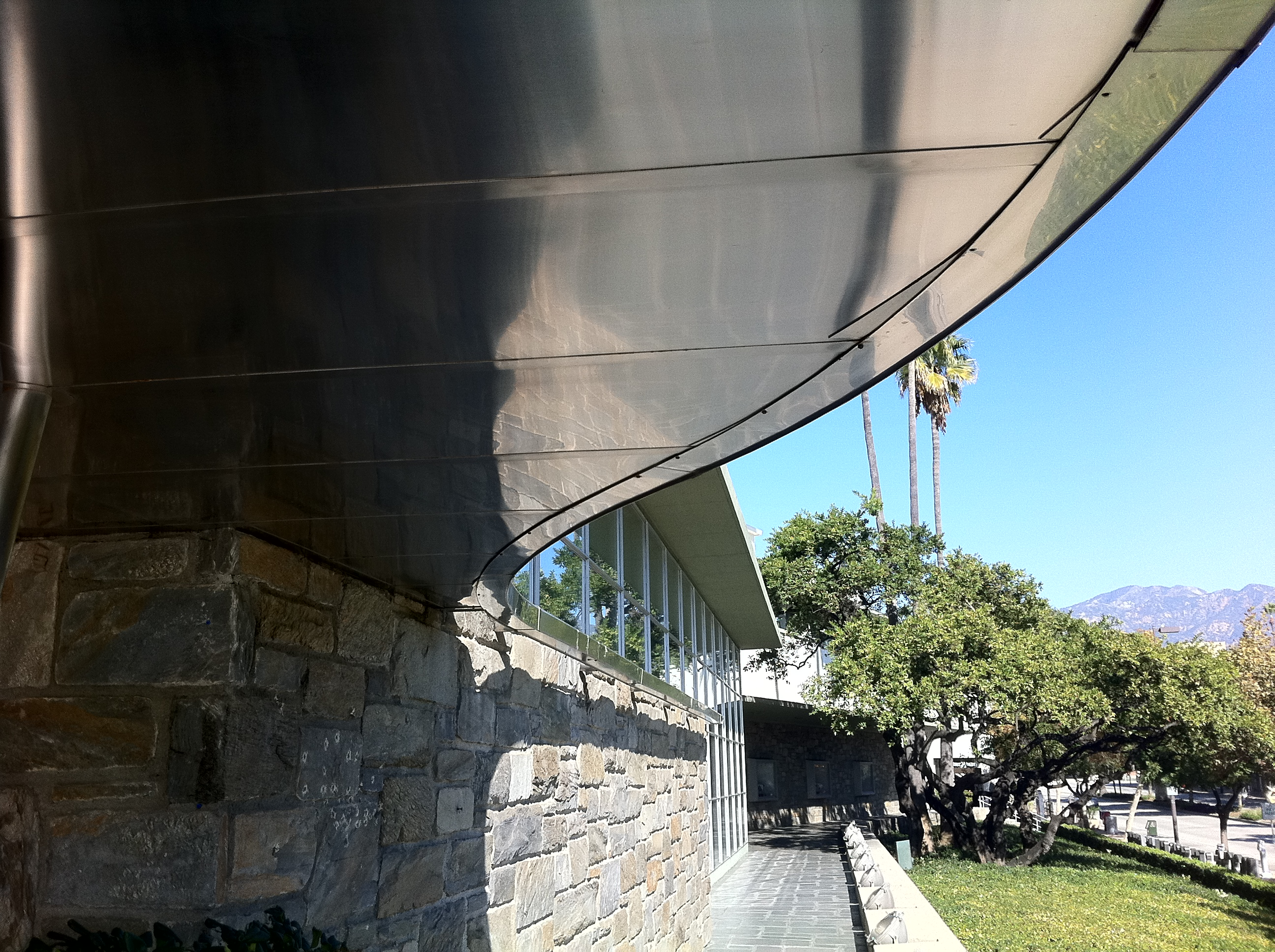
Bullock's Pasadena, looking north

=== Notability ===
The store's promoters touted it as the "store of tomorrow" and Arts and Architecture magazine described it as "one of the world's most modern buildings." In fact, the design was recipient of an AIA Merit Award in 1950.

The store's elegance and prestige was the impetus for a surge in commercial development on both sides of South Lake Avenue following the Second World War. Previously a residential street bounded by houses, the street was soon dotted with upscale shops, boutiques, national retailers and restaurants and became known as one of the premiere shopping destinations in the San Gabriel Valley.

=== Decline ===
The South Lake Avenue shopping district, in which Bullock's Pasadena was a major presence, began to lose its appeal in the late 1980s. While Pasadena's Old Town district, once regarded as seedy, was redeveloped as a fashionable shopping and entertainment district, the formerly prominent South Lake Avenue lost much of its distinction. It is, however, still considered a distinctive and more exclusive shopping district, with surrounding boutiques and starred restaurants, and draws patronage from the nearby California Institute of Technology and the affluent community of San Marino.

=== Current use of building ===
On July 12, 1996, the building was listed on the National Register of Historic Places as No. 96000776. In May 2000, the city of Pasadena's Design Review Board granted approval for a redevelopment of the building's surrounding area as part of a new shopping destination called "The Shops on Lake Avenue," a $33 million (~$57 million in 2024) project, featuring specialty shops, 27,000 square feet (2,500 m^{2}) of new restaurants and a new 300-space-parking garage, increasing parking capacity to nearly 1,200 spaces. Developed by Cleveland, Ohio-based Forest City Development California, Inc. and owned by Federated Department Stores, the project opened in the spring of 2002 and currently houses a Macy's department store in the original Bullock's location.

== See also ==
- National Register of Historic Places listings in Los Angeles
