= California State Building (Los Angeles) =

Demolished office building in Los Angeles, California

Coordinates: 34.053416°N 118.244512°W

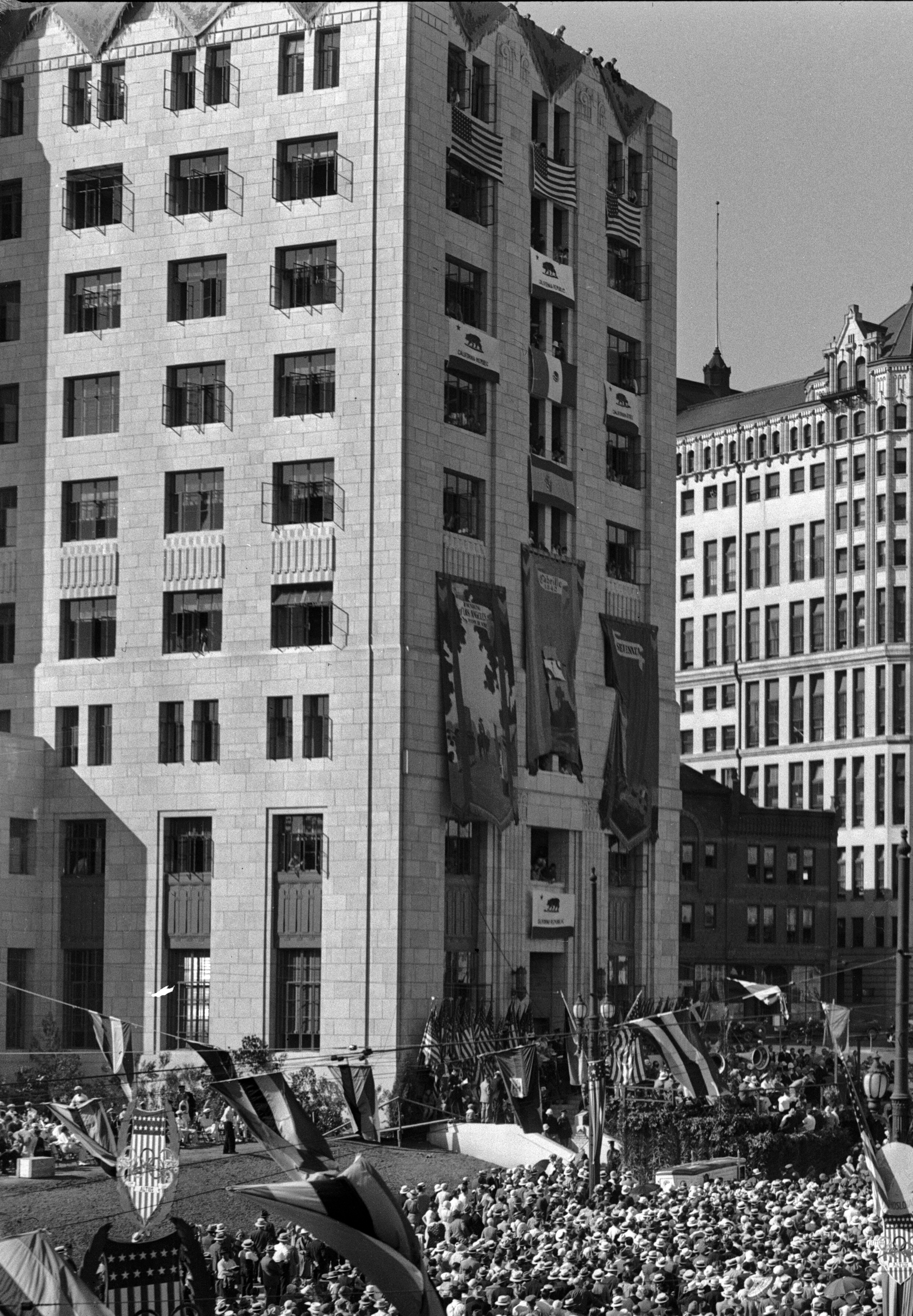
The dedication ceremony for the building

The California State Building, originally referred to simply as the State Office Building, was a 13-story Art Deco building housing state offices on the northwest corner of First and Spring streets in the Civic Center district of downtown Los Angeles. It was completed in 1931 and opened in 1932. Analysis after the 1971 Sylmar earthquake showed it to be structurally unsound and it was demolished in 1975–1976.

The building occupied the width of the block from Broadway to Spring and from First Street north to Court Street, with the exception of the Los Angeles Times building which sat at the northeast corner of Broadway and First until the late 1930s. The site had previously been occupied by the Larronde Block, a two-story building of retail stores and offices built in 1882, and which was demolished.

The architect was John C. Austin, who was also head of the Los Angeles Chamber of Commerce at the time. The building cost $1,250,000 to build. Ground was broken on August 21, 1930. The dedication ceremony was July 29, 1932, with Vice President Charles Curtis presenting the Flying Cross to trans-Atlantic aviator Amelia Earhart at the opening ceremony, which about 300,000 people attended.
