= Stanton & Stockwell =

Stanton & Stockwell was a partnership of Jesse Earl Stanton and William Francis Stockwell, two architects active in Southern California during the mid-20th century. Works attributed to them include:

- Los Angeles Mall, bounded by Main, Los Angeles, and Temple streets and US 101, Civic Center, Downtown Los Angeles (1974)
- First Junípero Serra California State Office Building, 107 S. Broadway, Civic Center, Downtown Los Angeles (1958-1960)
- California State Office Building Parking Garage, 145 S. Broadway, Civic Center, Downtown Los Angeles (1958-1960)
- Belmont High School
- Trojan Hall, University of Southern California
- David X. Marks Tower (1963) and Hall (1954)
- Various buildings at UCLA, including the mathematical sciences building.

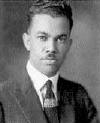
Paul Revere Williams

Attributed to the partnership of Stanton, Stockwell, Williams and Wilson: Jesse Earl Stanton, William Francis Stockwell, Paul Revere Williams, Adrian Jennings Wilson; formed to build the pair of Late Moderne civic buildings as part of the 1947 Civic Center Master Plan that ultimately transformed Bunker Hill, as the Civic Center expanded westward:

- Stanley Mosk Courthouse, fourth building in history to house the Los Angeles County Superior Court, Civic Center, Downtown Los Angeles (1956-1958)
- Kenneth Hahn Hall of Administration (orig. Los Angeles County Hall of Administration, 1960), Civic Center, Downtown Los Angeles (1960)
