= Ramón C. Cortines School of Visual and Performing Arts =

Public arts school in Los Angeles, California

Grand Arts High School

Location
- 450 North Grand Avenue; Los Angeles, California; United States; 34.0595965°N 118.2443026°W

Information
- Type: Public
- Established: September 9, 2009
- School district: Los Angeles Unified School District
- Principal: Mr. Martinez (The Milkman)
- Grades: 9-12
- Enrollment: 1,171 (2022–23)
- Campus: Urban
- Nickname: VAPA, Grand Arts, Number 9, Cortines
- Alumni: Doja Cat
- Website: Official website

The Ramón C. Cortines School of Visual and Performing Arts (or Grand Arts High School) known unofficially as “VAPA” by students, is a performing arts public high school in the Los Angeles Unified School District. It is located on the site of the old Fort Moore at the corner of Grand Avenue and Cesar E. Chavez Avenue in Downtown Los Angeles, California, United States, adjacent to Chinatown. Grand Arts anchors the north end of Los Angeles' "Grand Avenue Cultural Corridor". The school's distinctive architecture has made the facility noteworthy beyond the Los Angeles area.

The school was built with the intention to be a public arts facility for the community. The concert hall was designed with a Broadway sized proscenium stage, contains 927 seats, orchestra pit, and fully equipped sound and lighting booths. The hall has been used to present popular musicals with assistance from Broadway casts, directors, and other crew. In addition to the concert hall, the school offers students a 250 seat black box theater, an outdoor amphitheater, a professional scene shop, photography and broadcast studios, science and computer labs, four dance studios, and specialized spaces for art, music, and theater classes.

The school admits around 250-300 incoming freshmen students each year, with Media Arts, Dance, Music, Theatre, and Visual Arts accounting for a portion of the incoming freshman. However, Visual Arts is by far the most applied to and the largest, with around 30%-40% of the school belonging to the Visual Arts Academy. Despite this, Visual Academy consistently receives less funding from the school per capita than all other academies. Students are admitted via a lottery which takes place each spring. Admission requires no prior training or auditions, and there are no fees or tuition.

The school's leadership history includes, founding administrator and former principal Ken Martinez, and former Executive Artistic Director, Kim M. Bruno (former principal of Fiorello H. LaGuardia High School of Music & Art and Performing Arts and Professional Performing Arts School).

== Programs ==
The school offers a full range of standard academic programs as well as specialty programs in four arts academies. Notable programs include:

- Music Production
- Photography with a film studio
- Animation
- Contemporary Dance
- Theatre performance
- Technical theatre

=== Dance Academy ===
Grand Arts treats dance as an integral part of a student's education. Students in the Dance Academy take classes in ballet, modern, tap, hip hop, cultural dance, and choreography.

=== Music Academy ===
All music students receive training in theory, sight reading, technical studies, history, and performance. The curriculum is anchored in the California Visual and Performing Arts Content Standards, and is augmented by extended partnerships with the Los Angeles Master Chorale, the Los Angeles Philharmonic, and the Los Angeles Opera; adjudicated festivals; and master classes with renowned visiting Master Artists.

In the Music Academy, students can take classes in vocal and instrumental performance. Music theory, music composition, concert band, symphonic band, jazz band, string orchestra, symphonic orchestra, concert choir, vocal jazz, vocal technique, and guitar are part of the curriculum.

=== Theatre Academy ===
The Theatre Academy offers stents a variety of classes that develop skills in acting and directing through a four-year acting program. The scope and sequence of each year's curriculum is designed to propel students into higher levels of acting achievement, regardless of initial experience.

Based in the California Visual and Performing Arts Content Standards, each grade level includes work that "begins with basic techniques in discovery of self through classes that study how movement, voice production and a freeing of the inhibitions of the mind and body in improvisation classes can enhance performance."

The Grand Arts Theatre curriculum includes Acting 1–4, Improvisation 1 & 2, Speech 1 & 2, and Stage Tech 1-3.

=== Visual Arts Academy ===
Students take classes in Principles of Drawing, Ceramics, Painting, Photo, and Life Drawing. Various AP Art classes are offered year-round. The Visual Arts Academy is by far the most popular, with a 30%-40% of students belonging to this academy.

=== Media Arts Academy ===
Media Arts is the most recent edition to the academy's offered at Ramón C. Cortines School of Visual and Performing Arts. Students of the Media Arts Academy take classes in Video Production, Animation, Studio Photography, and Cinematography.

== Notable alumni ==
- Doja Cat
- Lydia Night
- Marcel Ruiz
- Mason Alexander Park
- Ashton Sanders
- Arrow de Wilde
- Rain Spencer

== History ==
When the school opened on September 9, 2009, it was known as Central Los Angeles High School #9. Suzanne Blake was its first principal. In June 2011, the school board renamed the school in honor of former school district superintendent Ramón C. Cortines. As of 2014, it has been unofficially called Grand Arts High School, Cloud 9, Number 9, and most frequently VAPA.

In 2013, the principal of La Guardia High School of Music, Arts, and Performing Arts, Kim Bruno, left New York to become the school's new principal. While she has since left, there is no denying the mark she left on the school, including the community name change from VAPA to Grand Arts. Additionally, she was part of the school's restructuring, which included reducing the number of performances per year in favor of creating fewer but higher quality performances.

The school has been featured in several commercials, films, and photo shoots. In 2015, the school released a music video called "Dream It! Do It!", directed and choreographed by Debbie Allen. The video was produced and conceived by the school's principal, Kim Bruno. "Dream It! Do It!" featured Grand Arts and Debbie Allen Dance Academy students showcasing the importance of the arts in the Los Angeles community.

Kenneth Martinez, the school's first founding Administrator, rose to become Principal in 2015 until 2019.

Norman Isaacs, the school's former principal, resigned in protest over what he termed inadequate funding for the school.

Past productions at Grand Arts include the Dance Academy's yearly spring dance concert, annual musicales by the Music Academy, Hairspray, Once on This Island, In The Heights, Joe Turner's Come and Gone, Noises Off, The Glass Menagerie, Steel Magnolias, Twilight: Los Angeles 1992, One Flew Over the Cuckoo's Nest, Hello Dolly, Guys and Dolls, Dreamgirls, The Crucible where the school traveled and performed at the Edinburgh Fringe Festival in 2011, Peter Pan, and the school's inaugural production of La Llorona (an Aztec version of Medea).

In addition to the wide range season, five visual art exhibitions are produced by the Visual Arts Academy each school year, 2-4 Concerts, 2 Dance Exhibitions, and at least 1 Media Arts Exhibitions.

The school has also been the site of film shoots and pop up concerts. In 2013, the campus was used in reshoots for the Divergent film. In 2017, Katy Perry used the campus to hold a secret pop up concert.

Though the school was established in 2009, it has seen it's fair share of controversy. In addition to having four principals in 4 years, a favored science teacher was removed from class for mysterious reasons in 2014, causing a school wide protest; a student was cited for a dress code violation that lead to a district wide review of dress code rules after a school protest; and a previous assistant principal was arrested in 2022 on allegations of sexual violence against a minor.

== Demographics ==
White	Latino	Asian	African American	Pacific Islander	American Indian	Two or more races
16%	68%	2%	10%	0.1%	1%	4%

According to U.S. News & World Report, 89% of Ramón C. Cortines' student body is "of color," with 83% of the student body coming from economically disadvantaged households, determined by student eligibility for California's reduced-price meal program. Los Angeles Unified School District's own open-source data reports that 57.3% of the school's student body lives in economically disadvantaged households. Furthermore, less than 15% of the student body is at benchmark or above for the SAT Math section test, representing a roughly 10% decrease as compared to the school's opening year in 2009.

== Facilities ==
The school occupies a 9.9-acre (4.0 ha) block in downtown Los Angeles at the north end of the city's "Grand Avenue Cultural Corridor," which also includes the Disney Concert Hall, the Los Angeles Music Center, the Colburn School of Music, the Museum of Contemporary Art, and the Broad Art Museum. The facility includes seven buildings totaling 238,000 square feet (22,100 m^{2}). The final costs for construction were $171.9 million, and for the entire project $232 million.

=== Architecture ===
The facility was designed by the project team of HMC Architects (Architect-of-Record) and the Austrian firm Coop Himmelb(l)au (Designer-of-Record). They were selected through a design competition in September 2002. In 2006, ground was broken on the school.

The design has been controversial, with the school described as "bold", "unconventional", its forms "stunning" and "a testament to the provocative power of art;" its interior spaces as having "a surprisingly rich range of personalities", "prosaic," "almost barracks-like;" its classrooms as "confined and airless," and the cafeteria as "cave-like."

The school's most iconic form, a tower over the performing arts building, is a unique and highly visible sculptural form, intended to provide a point of identification and a symbol for the arts in the city. It was envisioned to be a public space accessed via the ramp that winds around the tower with a viewing platform on top. School officials objected, and so it remains inaccessible and a non-functional sculptural form. However, students are occasionally known to sneak up to the top of the tower.

An excerpt from Hawthorne's "Starchitecture High" states: "What...the school has taught [its students] about the architecture is not so much what they like and dislike about the design, or about what works and what doesn't, but rather the surprising and ultimately thrilling ways in which their high school campus reminds them of themselves and their peers. Like them it is something of a proud outcast: gangly, dreamy, and beautiful at the same time, trying to make its way in a culture that prizes familiarity over strangeness and sameness over individuality. For a teenager who dreams of becoming an artist or a dancer, and has maybe not always found that ambition popular or easily understood by others in his family or neighborhood, what kind of campus could be better?"

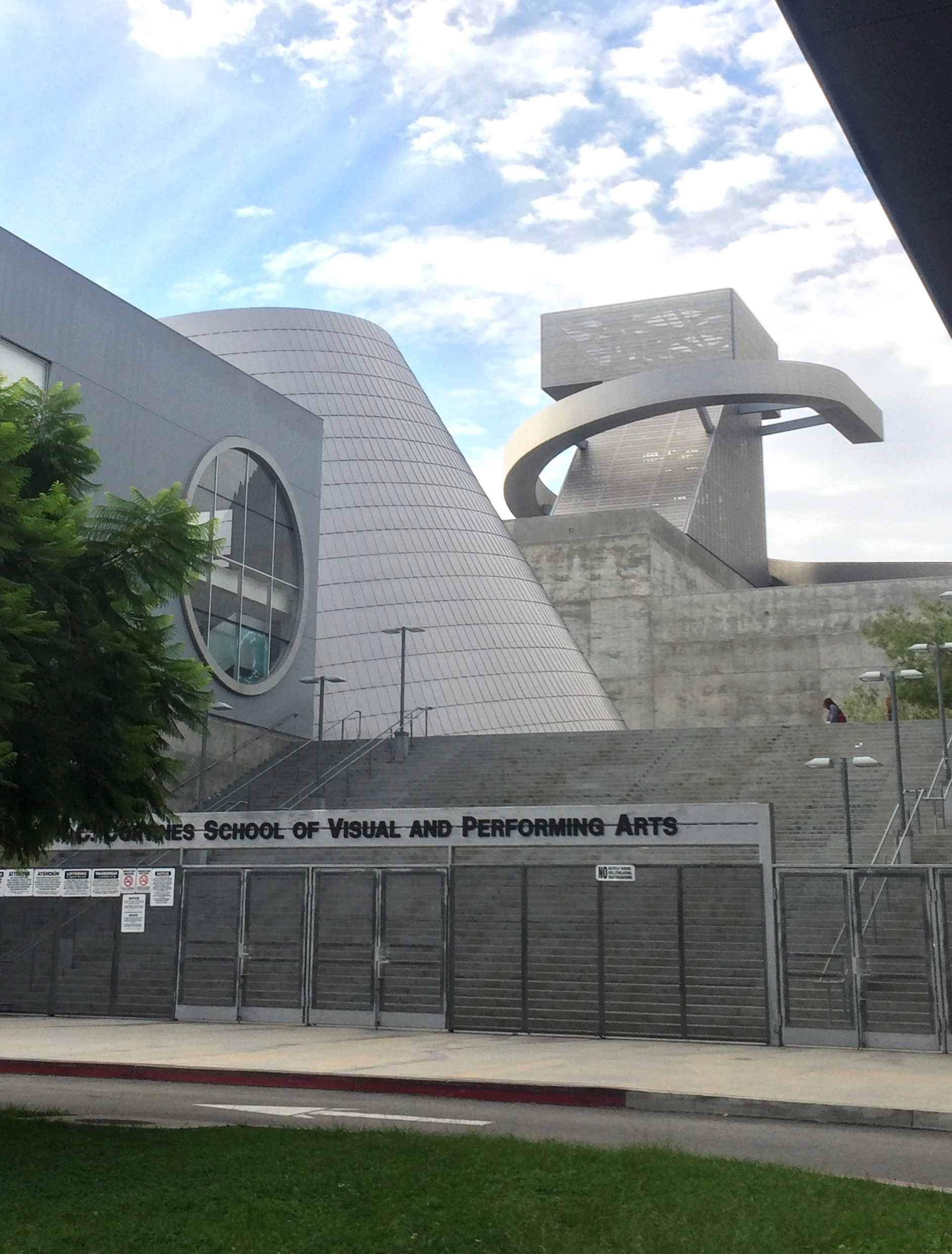
Main entry

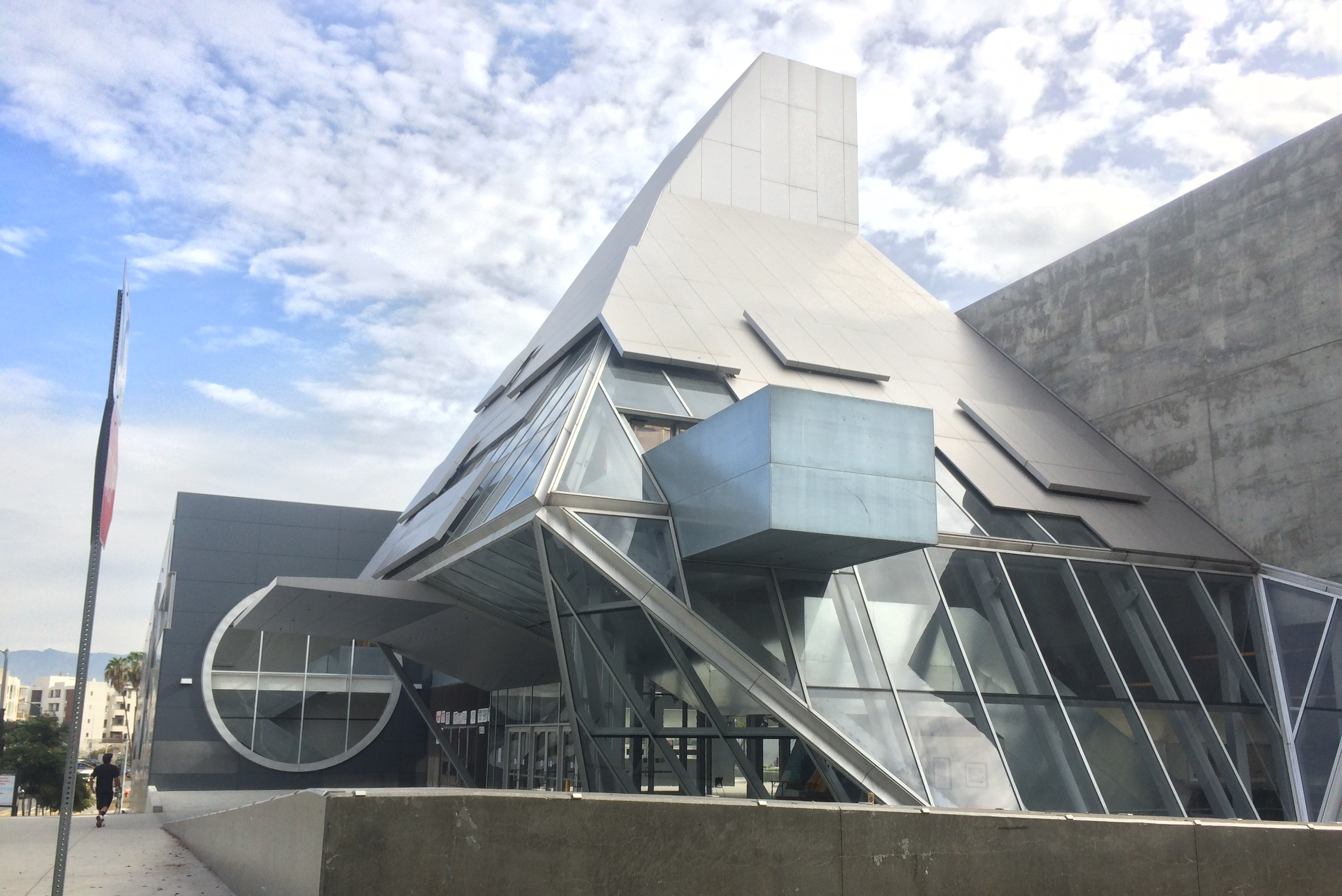
Performing Arts wing entry

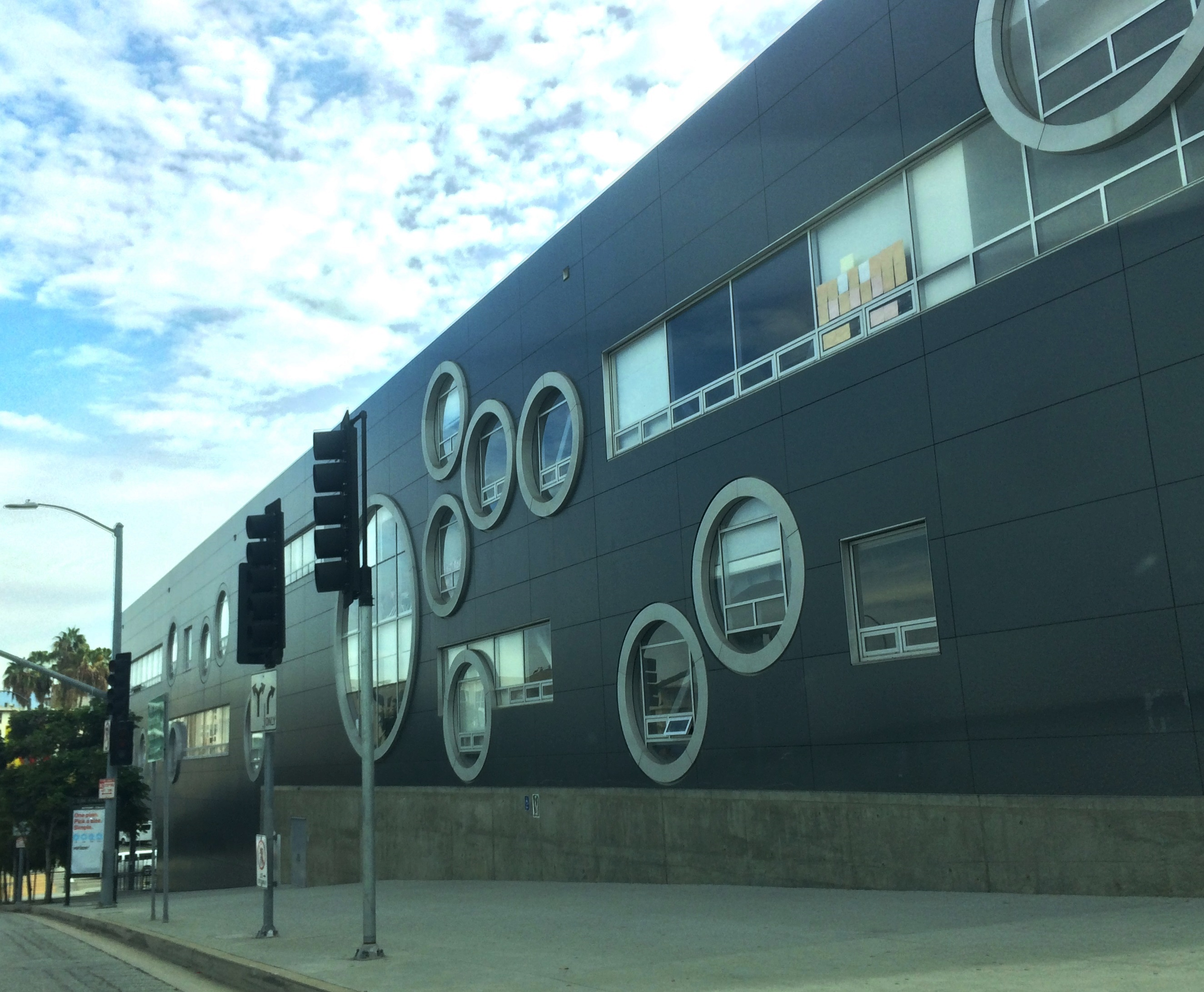
N. Grand Ave. facade

The campus has seven buildings, an outdoor swimming pool, and a full-sized athletic playfield.

=== Administration ===
Building #1 includes the main entry and administration offices as well as the Dance Academy.

=== Library ===
Building #2 is a cone-shaped building that incorporates the library.

=== Theatre and Visual Arts ===
Building #3 includes the Visual Arts Academy and the Theatre Academy.

=== Theatre/concert hall ===
Building #4 includes a 927-seat performing arts theater used for assemblies, plays, and concerts. This building is shaped in the form of the number 9 for the school's old name, CLAHS#9. This building also includes the black box theater, which can accommodate 250 people. The tower and spiraling form sit on top of this building. A main public entry for after-hours use is located at the west corner of the site.

=== Music Academy ===
Building #5 includes the Music Academy.

=== Cafeteria ===
Building #6 is located in the center of the campus and includes the kitchen and students' eating area.

=== Gym and dance studios ===
Building #7 includes the gymnasium, locker rooms, dance studios, an air-conditioned indoor basketball court, a weight room, and a parking garage.

=== Site of Former Cemetery ===
According to Scott Zesch's 2012 book, The Chinatown War: Chinese Los Angeles and the Massacre of 1871, many victims of the Chinese massacre of 1871 were buried in the City Cemetery partially located beneath the site of this school. He quotes Horace Bell as saying, "The city allowed promoters to map [the area], cut it up, and sell if off in small building lots." By 1895, the remains of the last Chinese people were disinterred. Zesch states, "The northern portion of the cemetery is now occupied by the Ramón C. Cortines School of Visual and Performing Arts."

== See also ==
- Los Angeles County High School for the Arts
- Los Angeles High School of the Arts
