= Los Angeles County Hall of Records =

Building in California, United States

Hall of Records
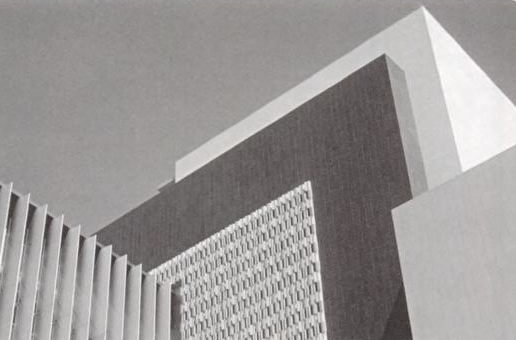
- Rear view of the Hall of Records

General information
- Architectural style: Modernist
- Location: Civic Center, Downtown, Los Angeles, 320 W. Temple Street, Los Angeles, California, United States
- Coordinates: 34.0558°N 118.2443°W
- Construction started: 1961
- Completed: 1962
- Cost: 13.7 million 1961 USD
- Owner: County of Los Angeles

Height
- Top floor: 17

Design and construction
- Architects: Richard Neutra; Robert Alexander
- Other designers: Honnold and Rex; Herman Light; and artists Malcolm Leland; Joseph Young

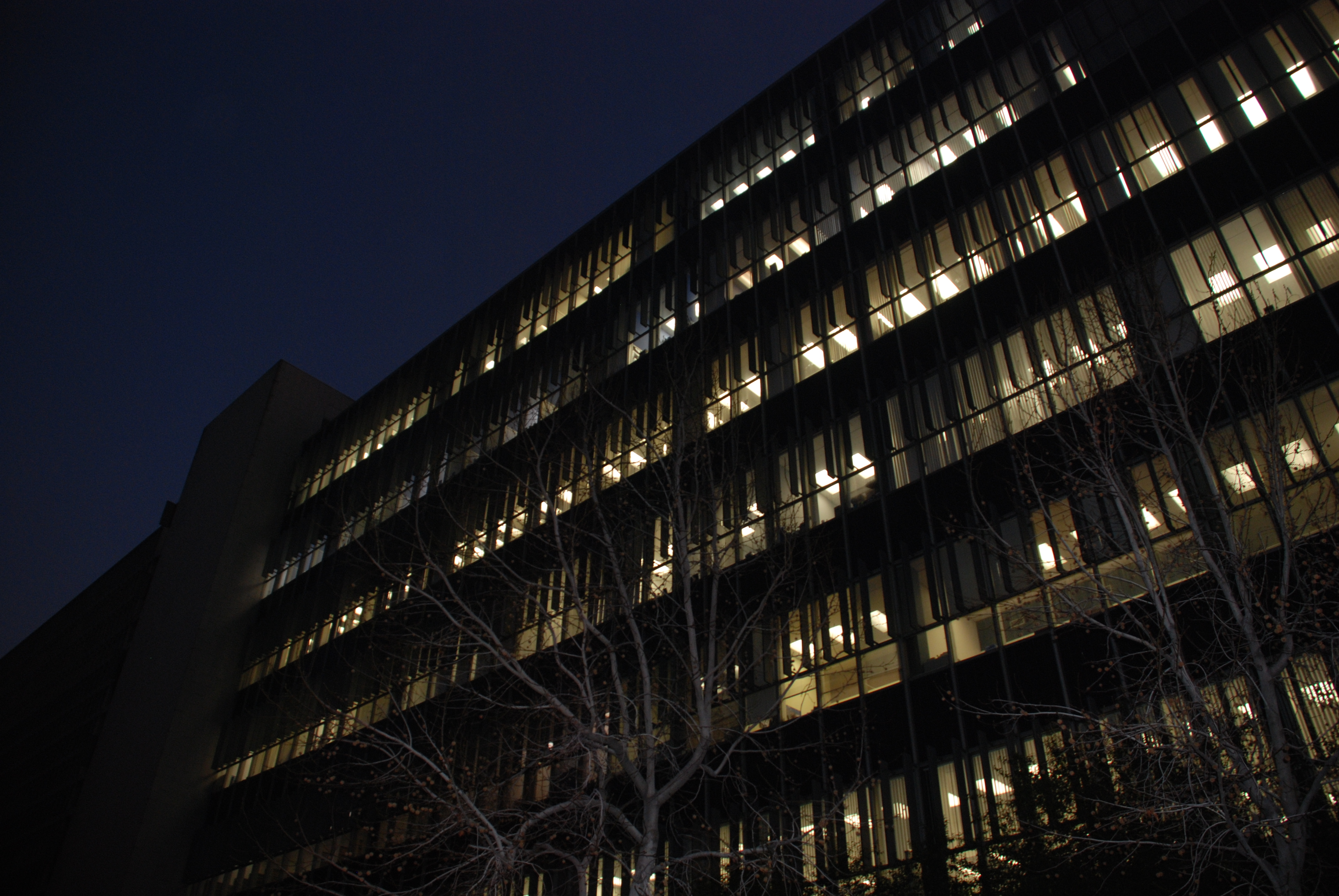
View of north face at night

The Los Angeles County Hall of Records sits in the northern end of the Civic Center in Downtown Los Angeles. The high-rise building by Richard Neutra (co-designed by Robert Alexander) is an example of international style architecture. The building includes louvers similar to the Kaufmann Desert House. Additionally, the screen to the right of the louvres was a feature by sculptor Malcolm Leland to incorporate ornamentation into modernist buildings.

The previous Hall of Records was immediately south of the current one, built in 1911 and demolished in 1973.

== Description ==
The Hall of Records was estimated to cost $13.7 million in 1961. Counter proposals were made by the Los Angeles County Chief Administrative Officer to preserve the old Hall of Records and move it to the Temple Street location, however, it was estimated that the cost of moving the building would be prohibitively high--$1.5 million to move, and much more to renovate.

Originally envisioned as two separate buildings, one for storing records and the other for workers, Neutra and Alexander combined the buildings into one. The T-shaped building has odd number floors on the north side, with double high ceilings and tall windows. The records block on the south side, has floors at 8-ft intervals. Currently, no vital records accessible to the public are in the building, and the windowless south records block designed for storage has been converted to office cubicles. In 1991, the County Recorder's office moved to Norwalk following merging the office with the County Registrar and County Clerk by the Los Angeles County Board of Supervisors.

The Hall of Records houses offices for the Alternative Public Defender, Probation Department, Regional Planning, Sheriff's Department, and the Los Angeles County District Attorney. The Los Angeles County archives are below the building, and there are publicly accessible tunnels to the Kenneth Hahn Hall of Administration.

There are terraces on the 13th and 15th floors, and at ground level. The upper terraces were designed for a dining room and lounge with panoramic views of downtown. Accessible from the 13th floor, they are currently only accessible to workers. The escalators from the ground through 3rd floor are flanked by grilles and screens designed by Malcolm Leland, also known for his work in the ModulArt movement.

The building was designed to be energy efficient, with large aluminum louvers on the south face running the height of the building. Originally, they turned with the angle of the sun throughout the day to allow more indirect light into the building. No longer operable, they are now locked in one position.

The Temple Street side of the building features a Mosaic Mural titled Topographical Map of Water Sources in County of Los Angeles by Joseph Young (artist). The mural and reflecting pool were restored in 2007, and again in 2017.

The Civic Center/Tom Bradley subway station serviced by the Metro D Line and Metro B Line is directly behind the Hall of Records.

== Critical reception ==
The original design drawings were praised as "contemporary and at the same time unusual" by County Engineer John A. Lambie in 1958. David Gebhard and Robert Winter describe the design of the building as "disorganized" in their guide to Los Angeles Architecture. The Los Angeles Times called the Hall of Records "Striking" in the week after it opened. The building was nominated for the 1964 R. S. Reynolds Memorial Award by the American Institute of Architects.

Reyner Banham's Los Angeles: The Architecture of Four Ecologies (1971), mentions the Hall of Records in passing, in the midst of a broader critique of downtown Los Angeles as "where the action cannot possibly be" (190). Banham concludes his thoughts on downtown with the following, placed below an image of the Hall of Administration: "They are, frankly, a gutless–looking collection but not gracious with it; they are neither tough-minded nor sensitive, nor architectural monuments, nor Pop extravaganzas. Above all they are not Los Angeles, but memorials to a certain insecurity of spirit among timid souls who cannot bear to go with the flow of Angeleno life." (192)

== See also ==
- Central Business District, Los Angeles (1880-1899)
