= Temple Street (Los Angeles) =

Street in Los Angeles, California, United States

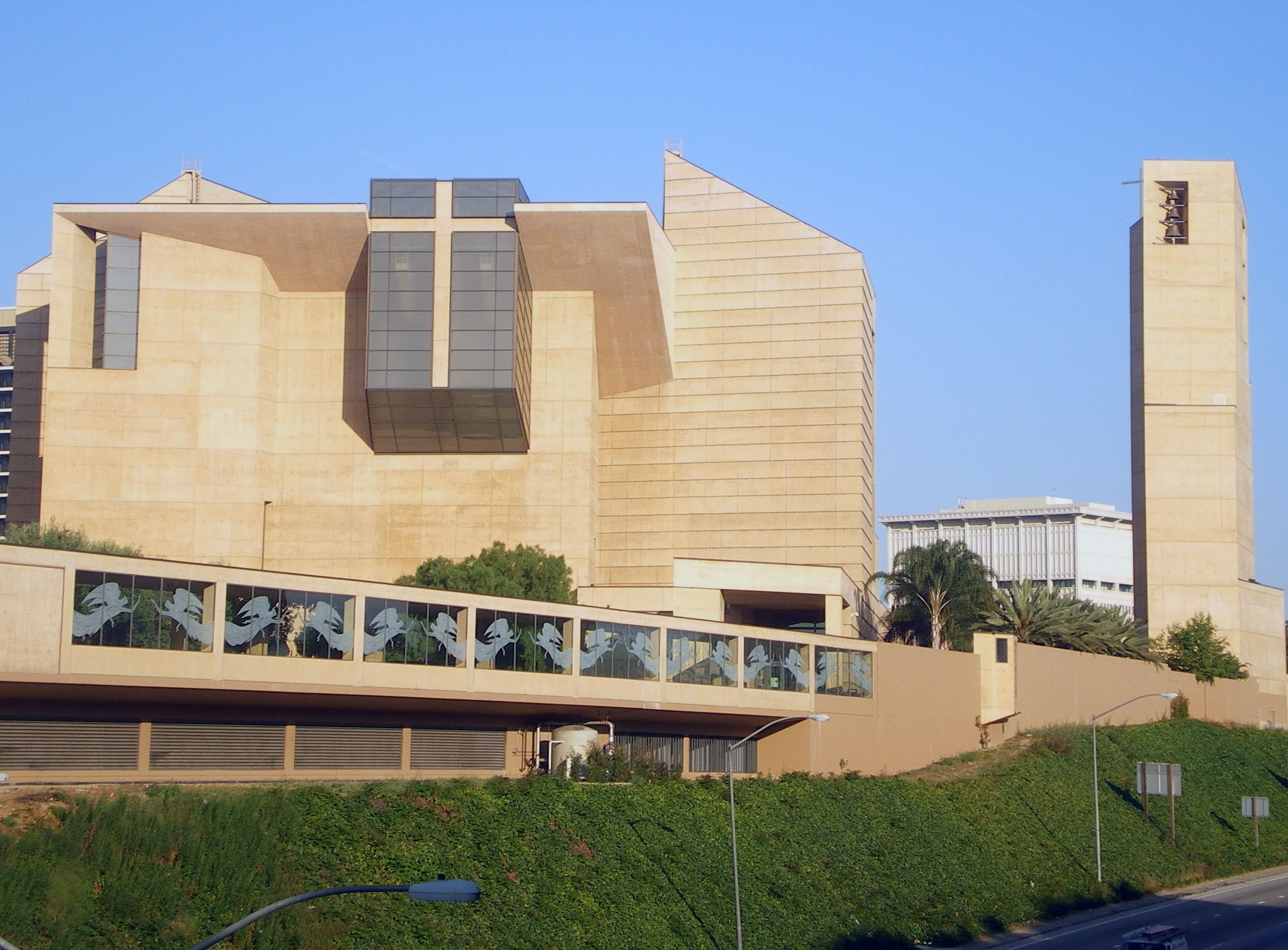
- Cathedral of Our Lady of the Angels as seen from Hill Street bridge by Temple Street
- West end: Virgil Avenue in Silver Lake
- East end: Center Street in Los Angeles

Temple Street is a street in the City of Los Angeles, California. The street is an east–west thoroughfare that runs through Downtown Los Angeles parallel to the Hollywood Freeway between Virgil Avenue past Alameda Street to the banks of the Los Angeles River. It was developed as a simple one-block long lane by Jonathan Temple, a mid-19th Century Los Angeles cattle rancher and merchant.

Originally, Temple began at Main Street, from which Spring Street also began running towards the southwest. The south side of this intersection where the three streets met was called Temple Block, an important retail building in early Los Angeles. In the 1920s and 1930s, Spring Street was rerouted to be parallel with Main Street, so that it intersected Temple one block west of Main Street.

== West Temple Street ==
From the late 1860s, development pushed westward from what was then the central business district, and West Temple Street became a fashionable residential thoroughfare, and remained so into the 1880s. The city's High School opened in 1871 at Temple's south edge atop Poundcake Hill, since flattened. It was removed and the prominent "Red Sandstone" Courthouse stood in the same place starting in 1891. A Hall of Records followed in 1911. After the construction of City Hall in 1925, the area between Temple and 3rd Streets, from Los Angeles Street westward to Hill Street, was designated the Civic Center district, and so Temple Street became lined with civic buildings.

Until the 1920s, Temple Street, as the city continued to grow west towards the ocean, was extended all the way to Beverly Hills. With, however, the creation of Beverly Boulevard, Temple Street was terminated at its current location at Virgil Avenue, near Silver Lake Boulevard. From that point, the roadway is Beverly Boulevard to Santa Monica Boulevard.

== East Temple Street ==
On the east side, Only after 1930 was Temple Street extended eastward past Main Street into the industrial district of town. East of Alameda Street, Temple Street occupies the former Turner Street, Temple Street terminates just east of Center Street and just west of the Los Angeles River and the railroad switch yards.

A short stub of Turner Street ran parallel from East Temple to Alameda, it remains very little of its characteristics due to the A Line and parking lot expansion.

== Famous residents ==
Actor Danny Trejo was born on Temple Street.

== Notable landmarks ==
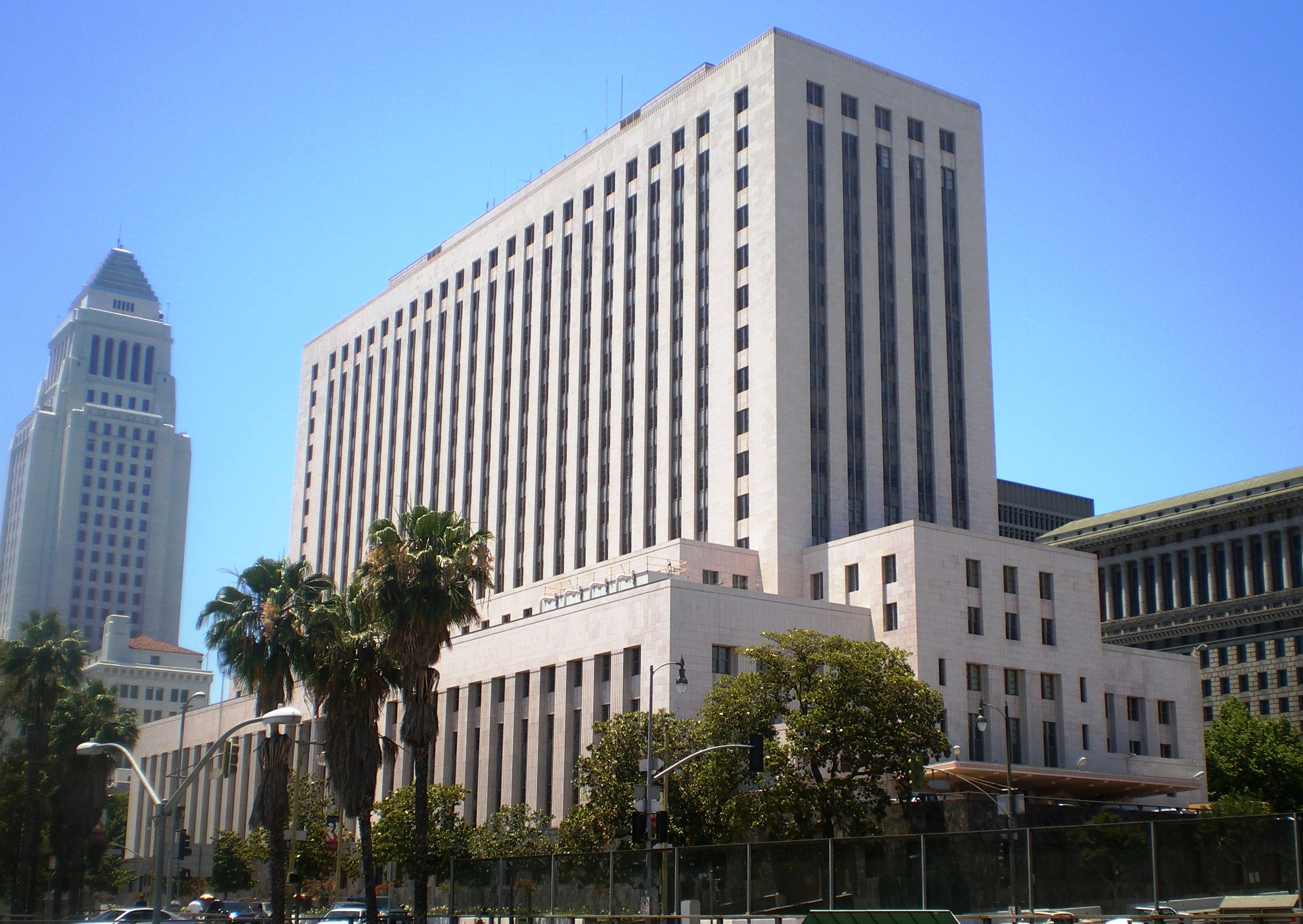
United States Court House at Temple and Main Streets

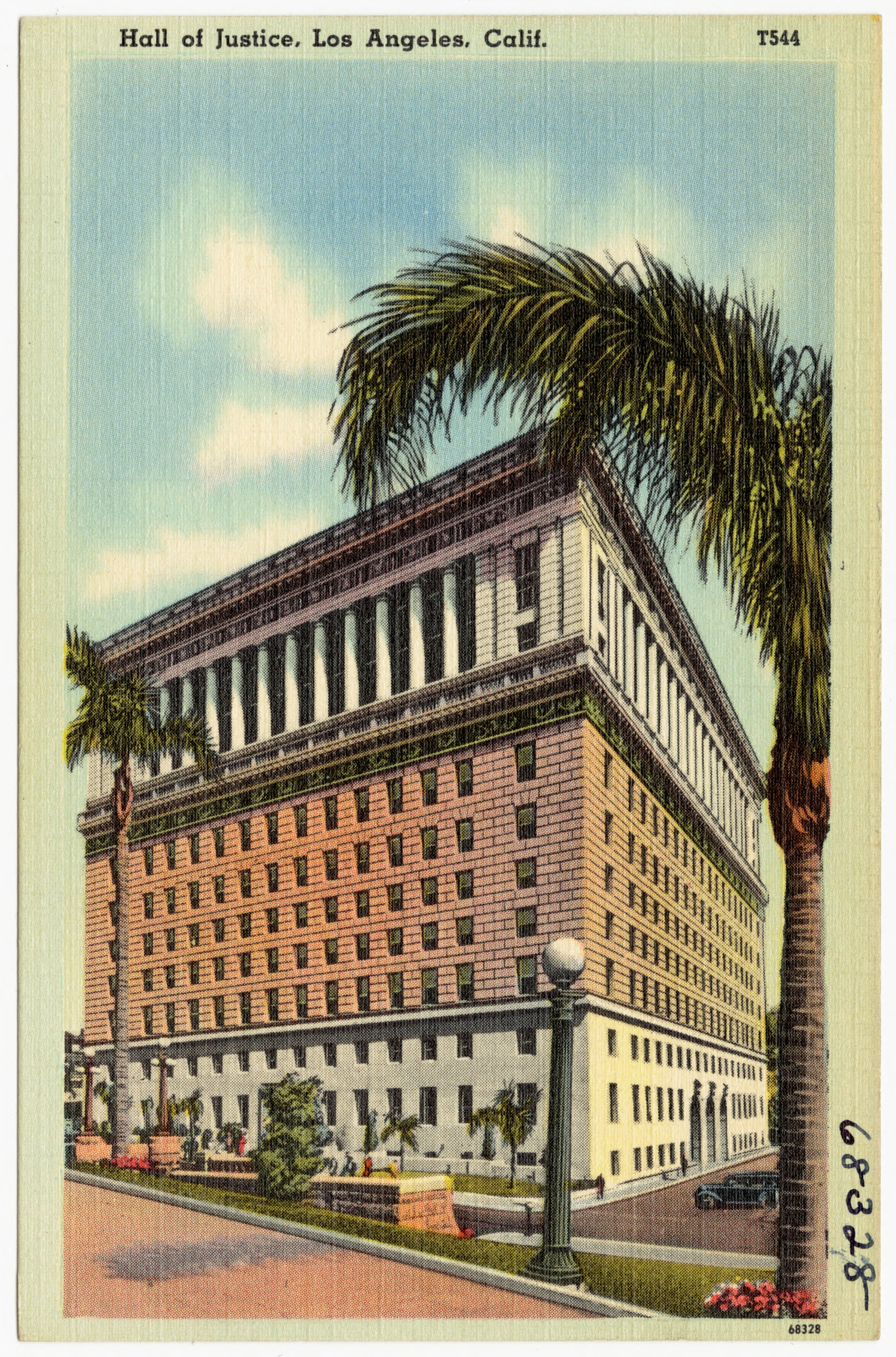
Hall of Justice

Several important Los Angeles landmarks are on the street:

- Ahmanson Theatre
- Cathedral of Our Lady of the Angels
- Echo Park
- Grand Park
- Historic Filipinotown
- Little Tokyo
- Los Angeles City Hall
- Los Angeles County Hall of Records
- Los Angeles County Department of Health Services
- Los Angeles Public Library's Echo Park Branch
- Los Angeles Police Department's Rampart Station
- Edward R. Roybal Federal Building
- Triforium
- United States Court House
- Hall of Justice

== Education and Transportation ==
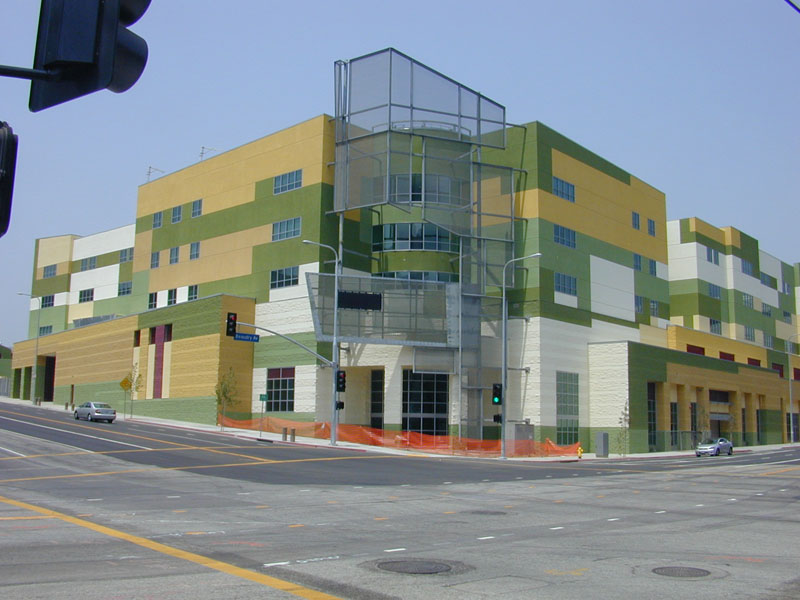
Edward R. Roybal Learning Center near Downtown Los Angeles

Number of LAUSD schools are located at Temple Street, including Downtown Magnets High School, Edward R. Roybal Learning Center, and Camino Nuevo Charter Academy.

Los Angeles Public Library's Echo Park Branch Library is located on the corner of Temple Street and Douglas Street.

Metro Local lines 10 and 92 run on Temple Street.
