= Late Moderne architecture =

Late Moderne is a phase of Moderne architecture as defined by the National Register of Historic Places.

== Style ==
The Late Moderne style incorporates elements of both the Streamline Moderne and International styles. The first examples could be seen in the late 1930s, however, late Moderne reached its zenith in large-scale government and commercial buildings during the late 1950s and the 1960s. The style can be detected by several trademark features, such as the bezeled window, where a protruding flange resembling a bezel incorporates and outlines groups of windows. Often the single material and color of the walls and any structural projections contrasts with the frames (or other surrounds) of windows, but not using brickwork or stucco window dressings as in Baroque and High Classical. An example of the Late Moderne style in Palm Springs is the Dollard Building (1947), designed by John Porter Clark and Albert Frey. Character-defining features include:

- Horizontal bands of bezeled windows, sometimes with aluminum louvers
- Flat roofs
- Operable steel sash windows ( casement, awning, or hopper type)
- Exposed concrete or cement plaster veneer
- Projecting window frames
- Horizontal emphasis

== Examples ==
Examples of Late Moderne include:

- Bullock's Pasadena, Pasadena, California, 1945 (opened 1947)
- Superior Oil Company Building, 555 S. Flower St., Los Angeles, California (1955)
- 1202 3rd Street Promenade (former J.C. Penney Building, 1949), Third Street Promenade, Santa Monica, California
- 2019 Grace Avenue, Whitley Historic District, Hollywood, Los Angeles
- 95 N. Arroyo Pkwy., Old Pasadena, Pasadena, California (1925/1947)
- Alexanders, Hollywood Boulevard Historic District, Los Angeles, California (Alexanders (6624 Hollywood Blvd.): (original, Late moderne remodel of earlier 1917 commercial utilitarian structure.)
- Barber Lydiard Building, Great Falls, Montana Historic District
- Colonial Theater, Belfast Historic District, Belfast, Maine
- Department of City Planning (USO Hospitality House), San Francisco, California (1941)
- Dollard Building, 687 N. Palm Canyon Drive, Palm Spring, California, John Porter Clark and Albert Frey, architects (1947)
- Lunch counter and interior of Werner's Restaurant, Vickers Building, Baltimore, Maryland (1951)
- Southwestern Bell Capitol Main Office Late Moderne office expansion building at 1114 Texas Avenue, Houston, Texas (1950)
- Stuart Company Plant and Office Building, 3360 Foothill Blvd., Pasadena, California (1958)
- Vaughan Building (Western Building), Midland, Texas
