= 2Cal =

750-foot skyscraper in the Bunker Hill District of downtown Los Angeles

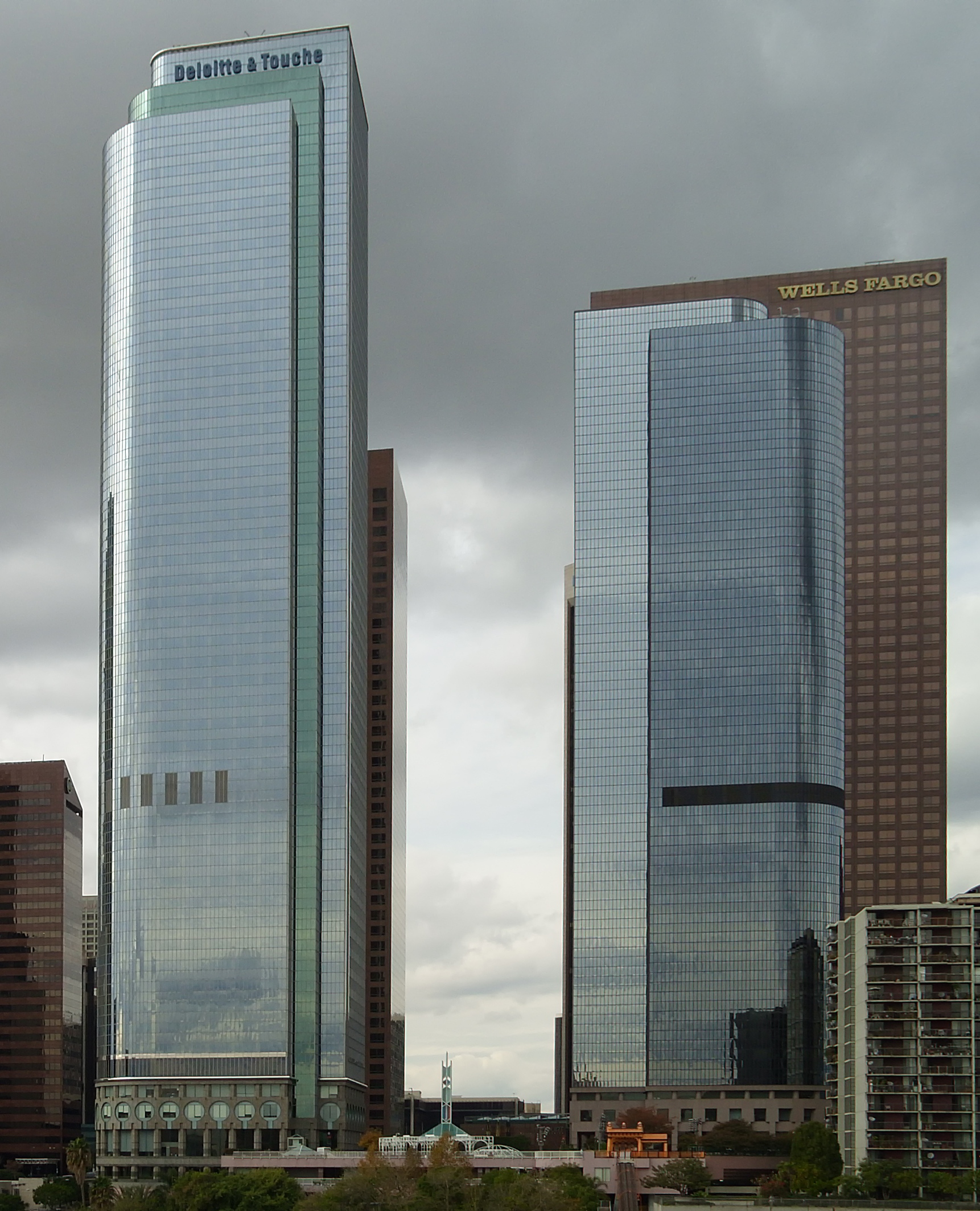
- 2Cal (left), 1 Cal Plaza (right).
- Interactive map of the 2Cal area
- Alternative names: Deloitte & Touche Building

General information
- Type: Commercial offices
- Location: 350 South Grand Avenue; Los Angeles, California, United States
- Coordinates: 34.051389°N 118.251389°W
- Construction started: 1990
- Completed: 1992; 34 years ago
- Owner: CIM Group

Height
- Roof: 228 m (748 ft)

Technical details
- Floor count: 52
- Floor area: 123,542 m^{2} (1,329,800 sq ft)
- Lifts/elevators: 26

Design and construction
- Architects: Arthur Erickson; AC Martin Partners
- Developer: Metropolitan Structures West
- Structural engineer: Martin & Huang International
- Main contractor: Hathaway Dinwiddie

2Cal, formerly known as Two California Plaza, is a 750-foot (230 m) skyscraper in the Bunker Hill District of downtown Los Angeles, California, United States. The tower is part of the California Plaza project, consisting of two unique skyscrapers, One California Plaza and Two California Plaza. The Plaza is also home to the Los Angeles Museum of Contemporary Art (MoCA), Colburn School of Performing Arts, the Los Angeles Omni Hotel, and a 1.5-acre (0.61 ha) water court.

== History ==
Completed in 1992 by Hathaway Dinwiddie Construction Company, Two California Plaza has 1.329 million ft^{2} (123,500 m^{2}) of office space. The towers were designed by Arthur Erickson Architects and named BOMA Building of the Year in 1997 and 2001.

California Plaza was a ten-year, US$1.2 billion project. Started in 1983, the Two California Plaza tower was completed in 1992 during a significant slump in the downtown Los Angeles real estate market. The tower opened with only 30 percent of its space leased and overall vacancy rates in downtown office space neared 25 percent. It was nearly 10 years before significant tall buildings were completed again in downtown Los Angeles.

California Plaza was originally planned to include 3 high rise tower office buildings instead of the two completed. Three California Plaza at 65 floors, was planned for a site just north of 4th St., directly across Olive St. from California Plaza's first two office highrises and was planned to house the Metropolitan Water District's permanent headquarters.

The site is an entrance to the Pershing Square subway station.

The construction and US$23 million cost of the Museum of Contemporary Art (MOCA) was part of a city-brokered deal with the developer of the California Plaza redevelopment project, Bunker Hill Associates, who received the use of an 11-acre (4.5 ha), publicly owned parcel of land.

In March 2012, the property went into receivership.

A tenant since 2000, Deloitte moved to the nearby Gas Company Tower in 2014.

In 2014, CIM Group acquired the building and made improvements to the restaurants and shops in the plaza which was popular but had been neglected. The California Plaza courtyard has an elaborate dancing-water fountain and the upper station of the funicular railway Angels Flight. The plaza also links to the Museum of Contemporary Art and an apartment tower.

Several clear shots of the tower under construction can be seen in the 1991 comedy/action film Harley Davidson and the Marlboro Man.

== Tenants ==
- Reliance Steel & Aluminum Co.
- Munger, Tolles & Olson LLP
- City National Bank (California)
- Consulate-General of Japan, Los Angeles

== Gallery ==
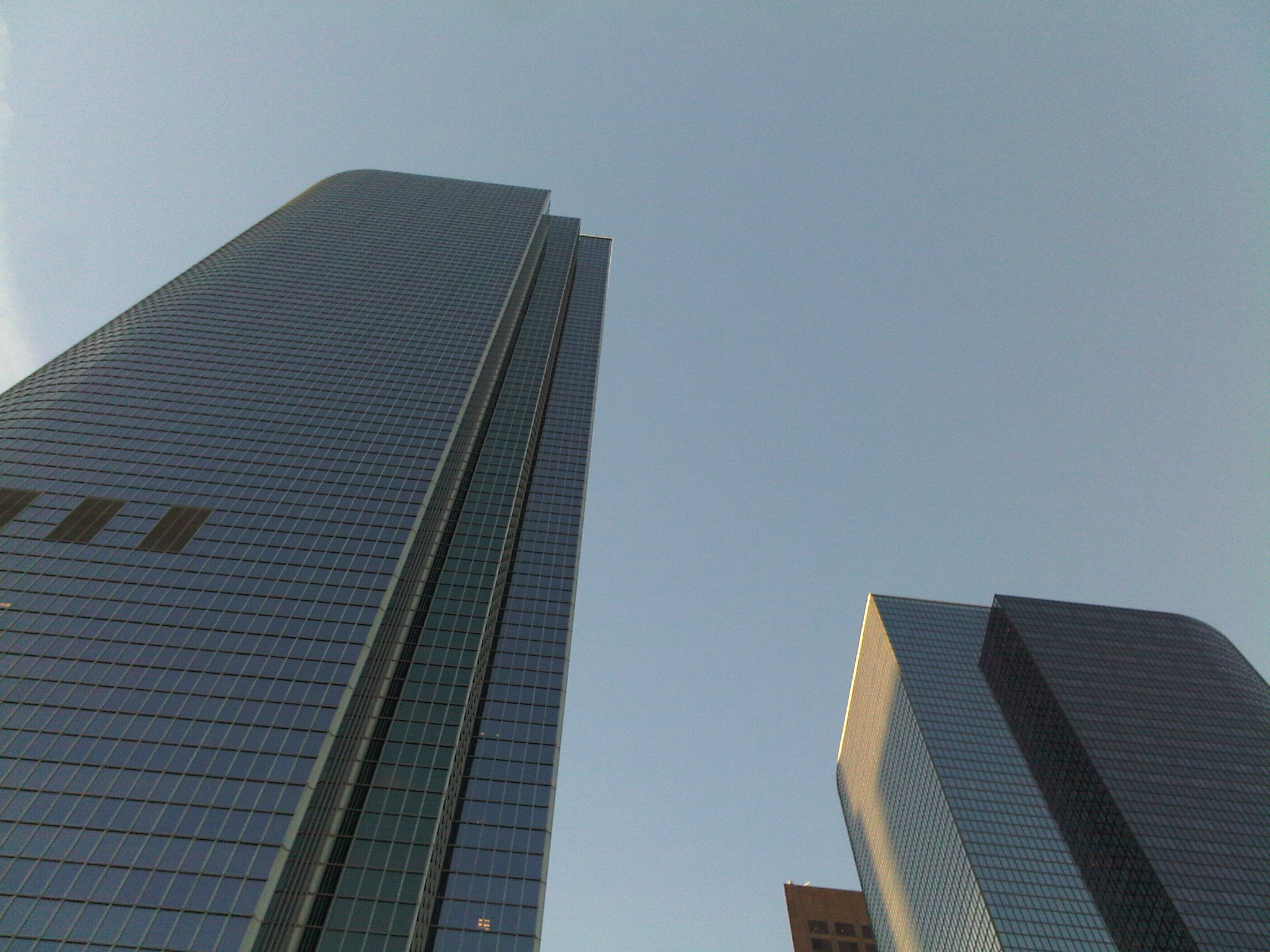
California Plaza towers

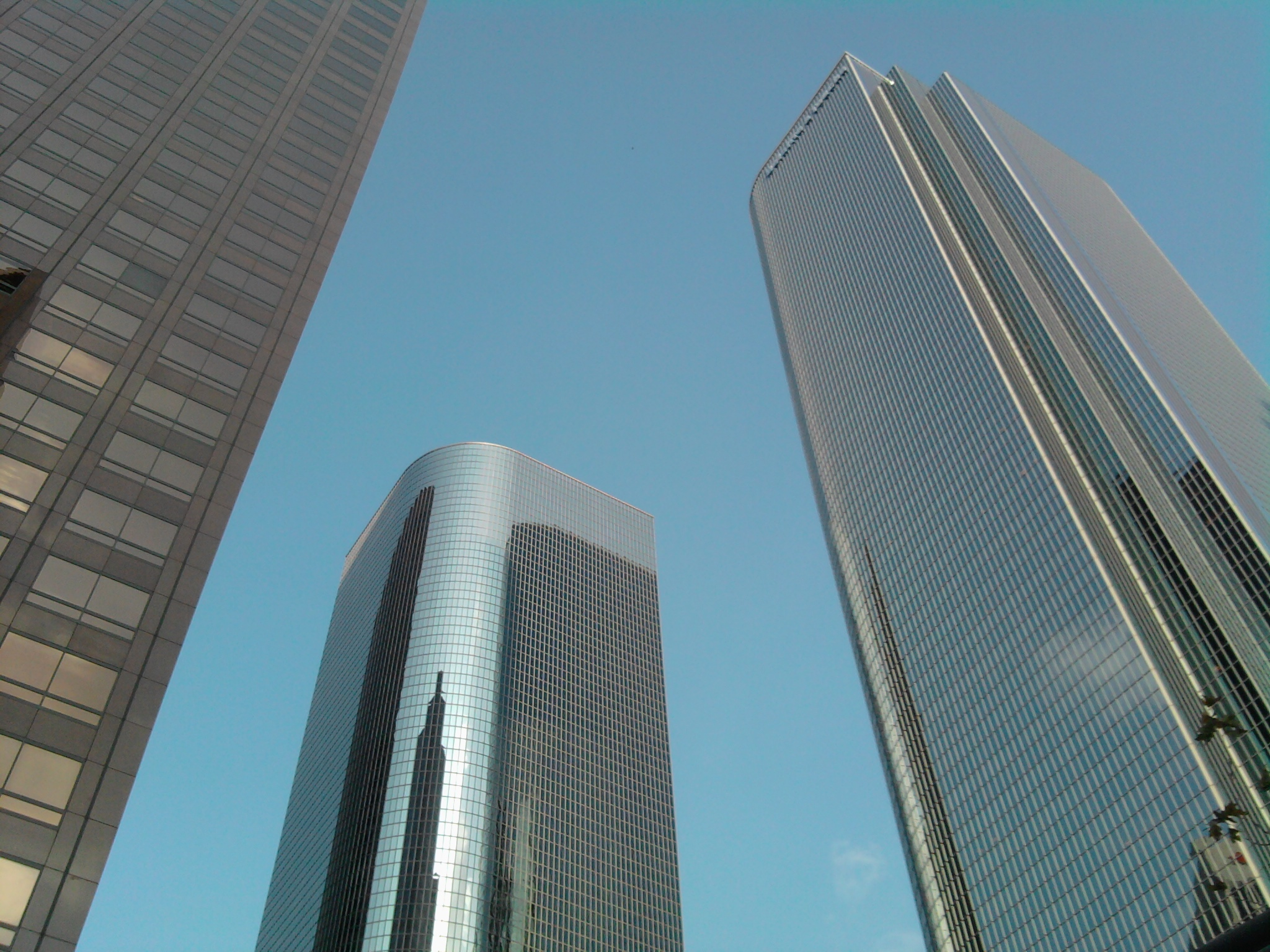
California Plaza towers one and two

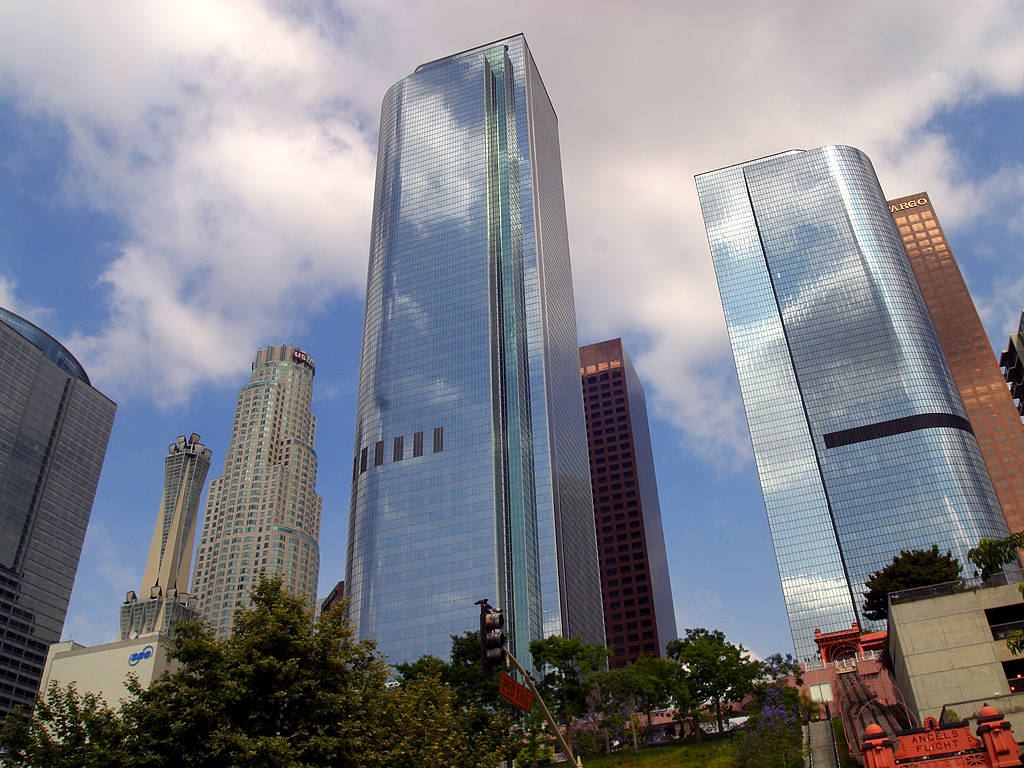
California Plaza towers with the US Bank Tower in the background

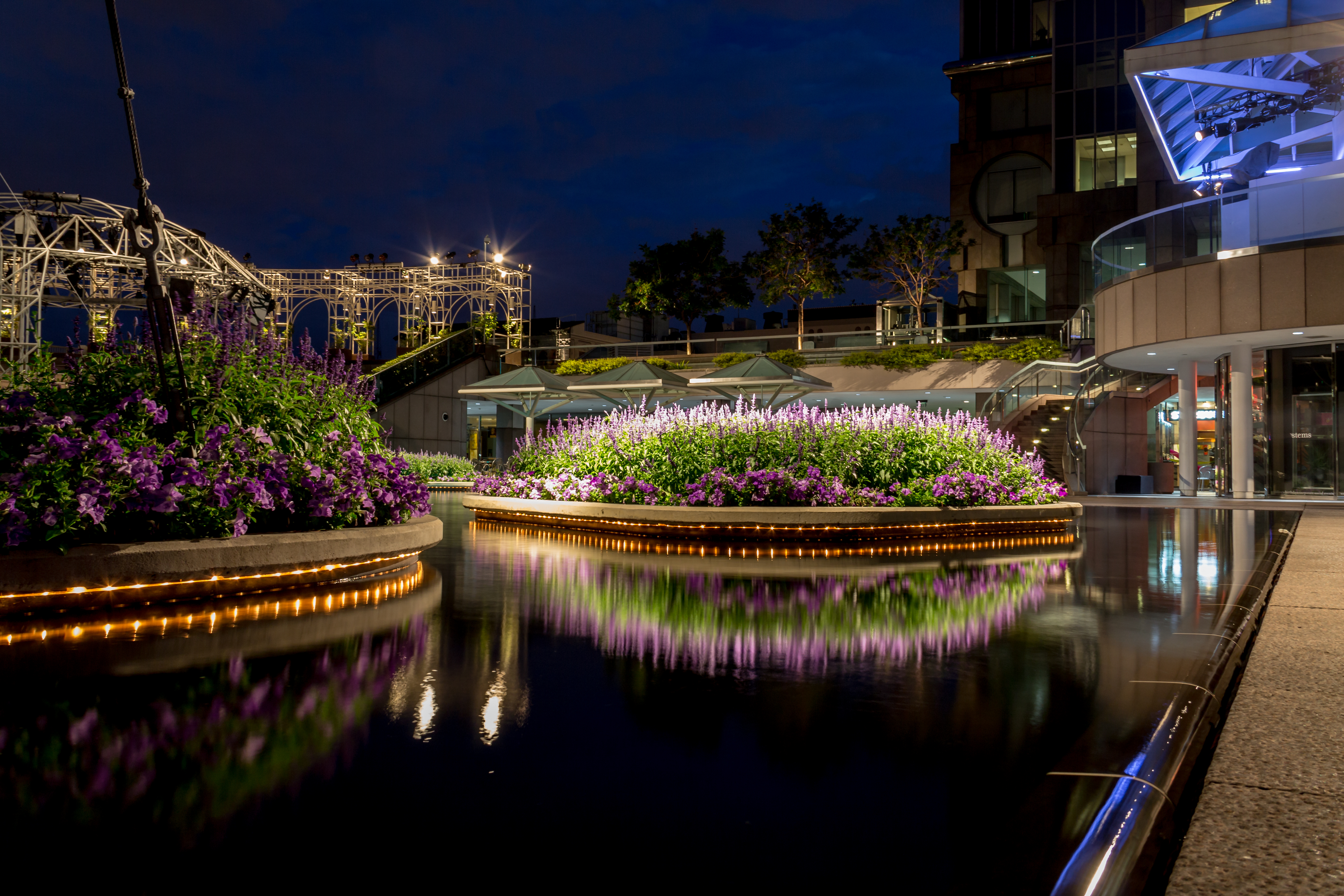
Fountain and amphitheater at night

== See also ==
- List of tallest buildings in Los Angeles
- List of tallest buildings in the United States
