= Night Has a Thousand Eyes =

1948 film by John Farrow

- Theatrical release poster
- Directed by: John Farrow
- Screenplay by: Barré Lyndon; Jonathan Latimer
- Based on: Night Has a Thousand Eyes by Cornell Woolrich
- Produced by: Endre Bohem
- Starring: Edward G. Robinson; Gail Russell; John Lund
- Cinematography: John F. Seitz
- Edited by: Eda Warren
- Music by: Victor Young
- Production company: Paramount Pictures
- Distributed by: Paramount Pictures
- Release dates: September 17, 1948 (Exeter, England); October 13, 1948 (New York City)
- Running time: 81 minutes
- Country: United States
- Language: English
- Budget: $1.9 million
- Box office: $1.5 million (U.S. rentals)

Night Has a Thousand Eyes is a 1948 American horror film directed by John Farrow and starring Edward G. Robinson, Gail Russell and John Lund. The screenplay was written by Barré Lyndon and Jonathan Latimer. The film is based on the novel of the same name by Cornell Woolrich, originally published under the pseudonym George Hopley. It was produced and distributed by Paramount Pictures.

== Plot ==
Late one night in Los Angeles, oil geologist Elliott Carson witnesses his girlfriend, heiress Jean Courtland, attempt suicide by leaping before an oncoming train, but manages to stop her. Afterward, the two go to have dinner at a restaurant, where they encounter John Triton, an acquaintance of Jean who claims to be clairvoyant. Elliott accuses John of attempting to drive Jean to kill herself by foretelling her death, with the intention of stealing her fortune.

To convince Elliott otherwise, John recounts a story from twenty years before. In the story, John, his fiancée Jenny, and Whitney Courtland (Jean's father) are touring with a magic act when John discovers his ability to see future events. Upon deciding that John's psychic gifts are legitimate, Whitney uses him to make gambling decisions and play the stock market, amassing a small fortune in the process. During one of their performances, John has a vision of Jenny's death following the birth of their child. Hoping to spare her life, John leaves Jenny with Whitney, and advises him to purchase a plot of land in Oklahoma. Jenny and Whitney eventually marry and conceive their daughter, Jean, but Jenny dies during childbirth, leaving Whitney a widowed father.

John proceeds to recount to Elliott that three months earlier, he read a newspaper article about Whitney, who, after striking oil on his Oklahoma property and growing immensely wealthy, relocated to Bunker Hill and established a business there. After having a vision in which Whitney dies in a plane crash, John relocates to Bunker Hill, hoping to find his old friend, as well as Jean. John eventually reaches Jean and attempts to warn her of her father's fate, but is too late. Whitney dies in a plane crash in New Mexico before Jean can speak with him. John's premonition seems to have come true, so he gains Jean's trust. Knowing he was a friend of her father's, she asks him if he is able to see her fate as well. John informs Jean that she will die within one week on a clear night under the stars.

After John finishes telling his story to Jean and Elliott, Elliott visits the police to inquire about John's past. The police inform Elliott that Whitney's plane propeller shaft was tampered with, suggesting the crash may have been orchestrated. Meanwhile, a terrified Jean, believing she is about to die, begs John to stay with her at the Courtland estate. Also staying at the home are a group of oil workers who planned to merge with the Courtland oil interests, and are now attempting to locate paperwork. While staying at the residence, John has a premonition of his own death by gunshot, as well as disparate details of Jean's impending death, which will occur at the feet of a lion. During the night, an unseen assailant attempts to smother Jean to death in her bed, but she survives.

The next evening, John is interrogated by police. Meanwhile, at the Courtland estate, a fearful Jean awaits the impending eleven o'clock hour, the time John believes she is to die. Minutes before the clock strikes eleven, a killer advances the hands of the home's grandfather clock, causing it to chime prematurely. Jean breathes a sigh of relief, believing she has been spared, and then steps into the garden. Moments later, the assailant attacks her, but John thwarts the murder attempt, only to be shot to death by police who arrive on the scene and assume him to be an accomplice. The assailant is revealed to be one of the oil workers who opposed the Courtland merger. At the crime scene, Elliott locates a letter from John's pocket detailing his own death, which he foresaw occurring while saving Jean's life.

== Cast ==
- Edward G. Robinson as John Triton
- Gail Russell as Jean Courtland
- John Lund as Elliott Carson
- Virginia Bruce as Jenny
- William Demarest as Lieut. Shawn
- Richard Webb as Peter Vinson
- Jerome Cowan as Whitney Courtland
- Onslow Stevens as Dr. Walters (as Onslow Stevenson)
- John Alexander as Mr. Gilman
- Roman Bohnen as Melville Weston - Special Prosecutor
- Luis Van Rooten as Mr. Myers
- Henry Guttman as Butler
- Mary Adams as Miss Hendricks - Housekeeper
- Douglas Spencer as Dr. Ramsdell

== Production ==
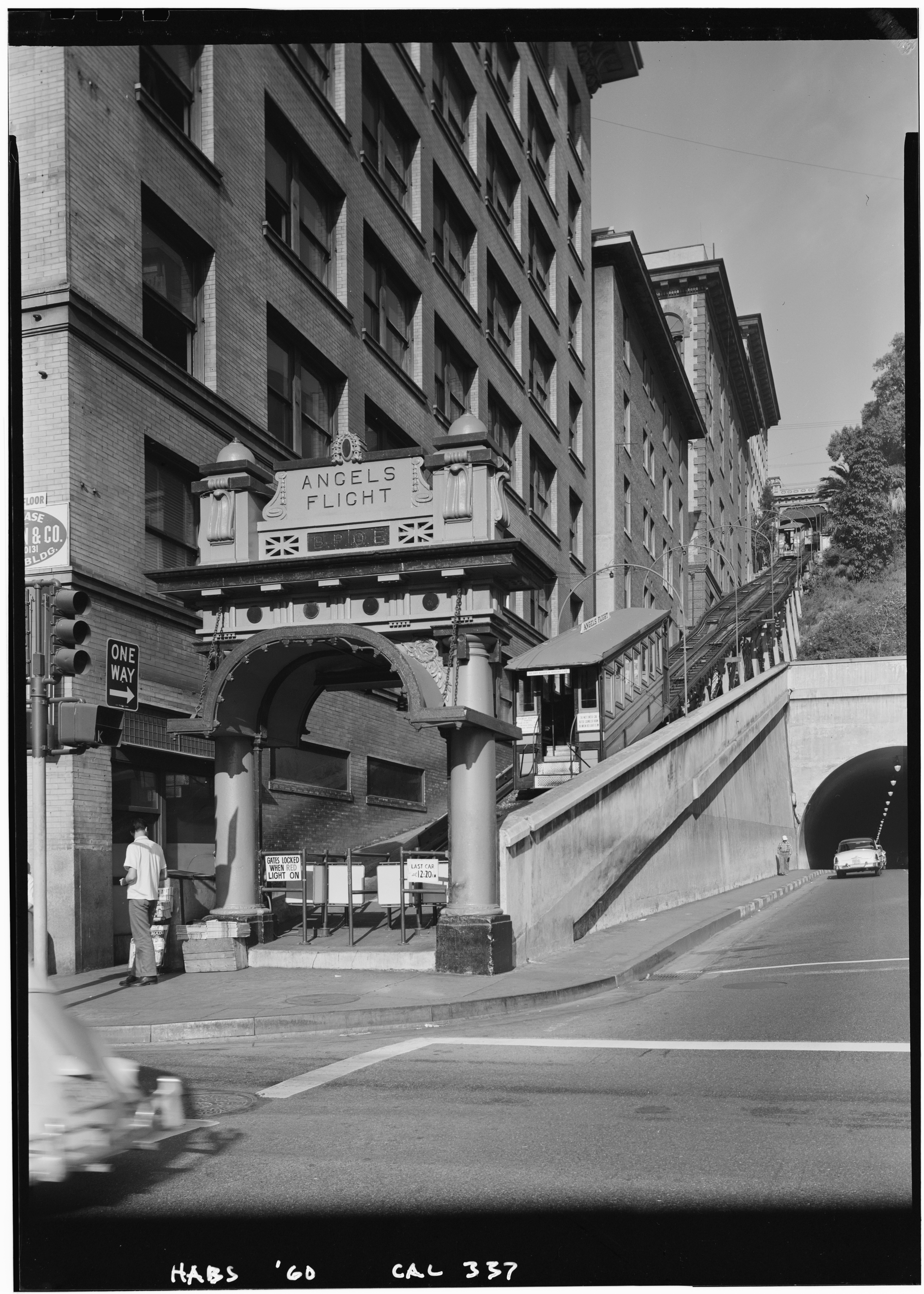
The film features the original Angels Flight funicular railway in Los Angeles

Filming of Night Has a Thousand Eyes took place in Los Angeles. The film features the original Angels Flight funicular railway in Los Angeles' Bunker Hill.

== Release ==
Night Has a Thousand Eyes was first released theatrically in England, opening on September 17, 1948 in Exeter. It subsequently opened in London and Peterborough, England on October 1, 1948. It premiered in New York City on October 13, 1948, and in Los Angeles on October 20, 1948.

=== Critical response ===
Leonard Mendlowitz of the Pittsburgh Sun-Telegraph gave the film a favorable review, deeming it "a completely unbelievable piece of hocus-pocus [that] turns out to be better than fair movie material due to its fine cast and taut direction."

The film is generally praised for its gloomy adaptation of Woolrich's writing. In his book Art of Noir, Eddie Muller writes: "No film more faithfully captured Woolrich's sense of doomed predestination than Night Has a Thousand Eyes."

Time Out Film Guide, however (in spite of praising the cinematography by John F. Seitz), gives the thriller a negative review: "Aside from the fine opening sequence -- Lund's rescue of Gail Russell from the brink of suicide, and discovery of her mortal terror of the stars -- a disappointing adaptation of Cornell Woolrich's superb novel."

A Variety review noted, "John Farrow's sure directorial hand is seen throughout unfolding of picture, scripted melodramatically by Barre [sic] Lyndon and Jonathan Latimer," and spoke positively of the cast, with the exception of Lund.

A Boxoffice review deemed the film "highly praiseworthy for its originality, if for no other reasons".

== Music ==
The film's main theme (written by Jerry Brainin and Buddy Bernier) became a jazz standard, having been recorded by Horace Silver, Carmen McRae, Harry Beckett, Paul Desmond and John Coltrane, among others.
