= LA Film Festival =

Annual film festival held in Los Angeles, California, U.S.

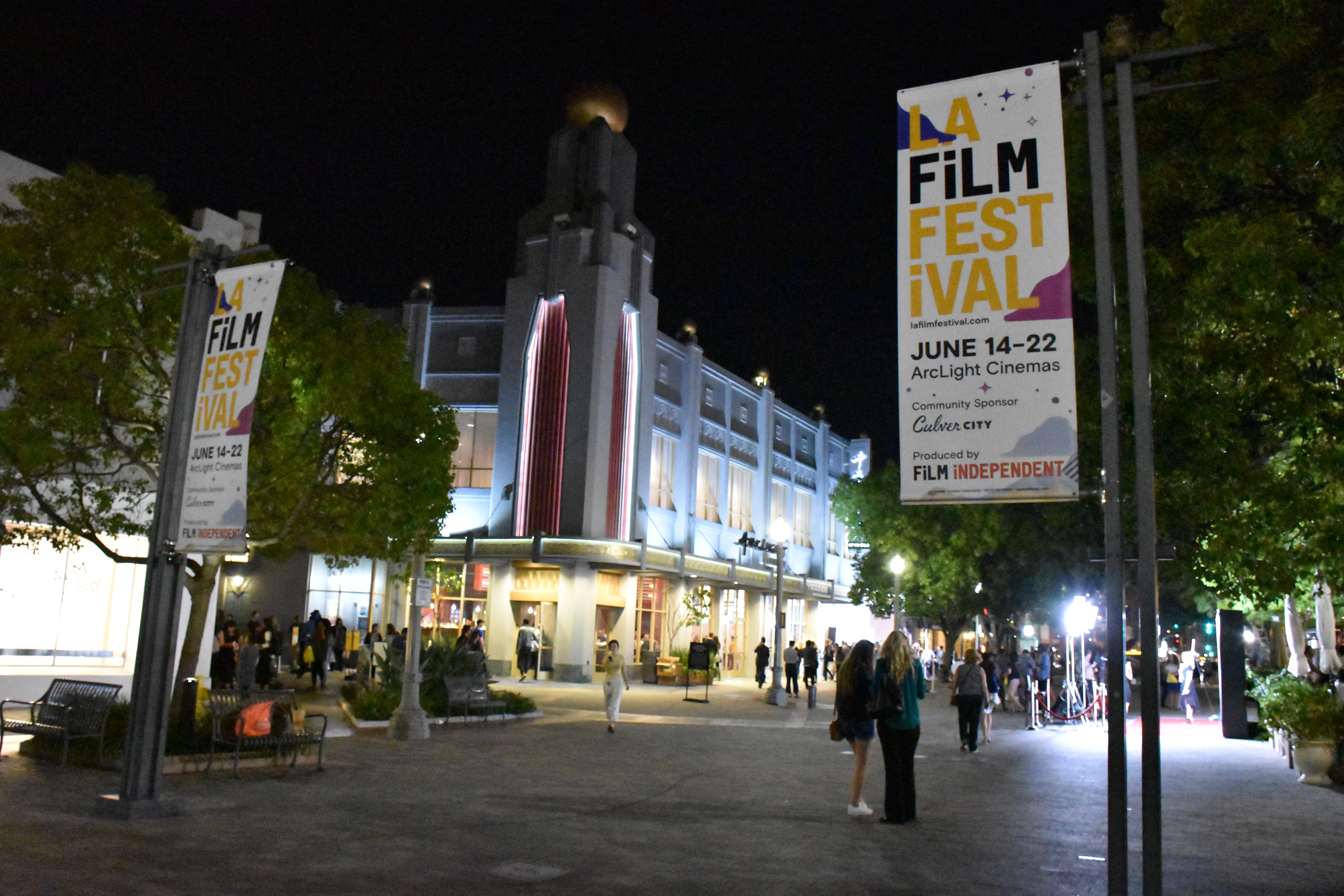
- Location: Los Angeles, California, U.S.
- Founded: 1995
- Disestablished: 2018
- Hosted by: Film Independent
- Language: English
- Website: filmindependent.org

The LA Film Festival (LAIFF) was an annual film festival that was held in Los Angeles from 1995 until 2018, when it was absorbed into Film Independent. It usually took place in June. It showcased independent, international, feature, documentary, and short films, as well as web series, music videos, episodic television, and panel conversations.

The LA Film Festival was a qualifying festival in all categories for the Independent Spirit Awards, and also a qualifying festival for the short films categories of the Academy Awards.

== History ==
Since 2001, it had been run by the non-profit Film Independent, which since 1985 has also produced the annual Independent Spirit Awards in Santa Monica. The festival began as the Los Angeles Independent Film Festival in 1995. The LAIFF ran for six years until it was absorbed into Film Independent in 2018. The first LAIFF took place over the course of five days in a single location: the historic Raleigh Studios in Hollywood. In 1996, the LAIFF expanded to include the Directors Guild of America Building in Hollywood. In 2001, the festival became part of the organization Film Independent (formerly IFP/West). In 2006, the Los Angeles Times became the festival's main media sponsor.

In 2010, the festival moved to the Regal Cinemas at the L.A. Live complex in downtown Los Angeles, with additional screenings at several other downtown venues including the Downtown Independent, the Orpheum Theatre, and the REDCAT Theatre. The Festival also has a long tradition of screenings at the open-air John Anson Ford Amphitheatre in Hollywood. Free screenings were scheduled at California Plaza, in conjunction with Grand Performances and FIGat7th.

In 2016, the LA Film Festival moved to the ArcLight Cinemas in Culver City and Hollywood. In 2017, it expanded to ArcLight Cinemas in Santa Monica. In 2018, the LA Film Festival further expanded and added the WGA Theater as a venue. It also partnered with the Wallis Annenberg Center for the Performing Arts to screen films there.

== Features ==
Over the course of nine days, the festival screened nearly 200 features, shorts, and episodes. The event also included world premieres of films, a variety of panels, seminars, and free screenings. The festival screened short films created by high school students as a part of the Future Filmmakers program. Films submitted to the festival were reviewed by Film Independent's programming department, which evaluated each film.

== Notable screenings and debuts ==
- Sidewalks of New York, directed by Ed Burns
- Things Behind the Sun, directed by Allison Anders
- With a Friend Like Harry, directed by Dominik Moll
- The Twilight Saga: Eclipse, directed by David Slade

== Guest directors ==
2001	Ang Lee
2002	Alfonso Cuaron
2003	Chen Kaige
2004	Mira Nair
2005	Sydney Pollack
2006	George Lucas
2007	Curtis Hanson
2008	Melvin Van Peebles
2010	Kathryn Bigelow
2011	Guillermo del Toro
2012	William Friedkin
2013	David O. Russell
2014	Lisa Cholodenko
2015	Rodrigo Garcia
2016	Ryan Coogler
2017	Miguel Arteta

== Artists in residence ==
2003	Kasi Lemmons
2004	Neil Young
2005	RZA
2007	Pharrell Williams
2009	Thom Mayne
2009	Khaled Hosseini
2010	Quincy Jones
2010	Jonathan Gold
2010	Paul Reubens
2012	Danny Elfman
2012	Michael Voltaggio
2012	Raphael Saadiq

== Spirit of Independence Award Recipients ==
2005	George Clooney
2006	Charlize Theron
2007	Clint Eastwood
2008	Don Cheadle
2013	David O. Russell
2014	Michael Barker
2014	Tom Bernard
2015	Lily Tomlin
2016	Ava DuVernay
2017	Miguel Arteta

== Awards ==
Awards were given out in the following categories at the conclusion of the festival:

- US Fiction
- Documentary
- World Fiction
- Nightfall
- Short Fiction
- Short Documentary
- Audience Award for Best Fiction Film
- Audience Award for Best Documentary Film
- Audience Award for Best Episodic Story
- Audience Award for Best Short Film
