= California Plaza =

Business and commercial complex in Los Angeles, California

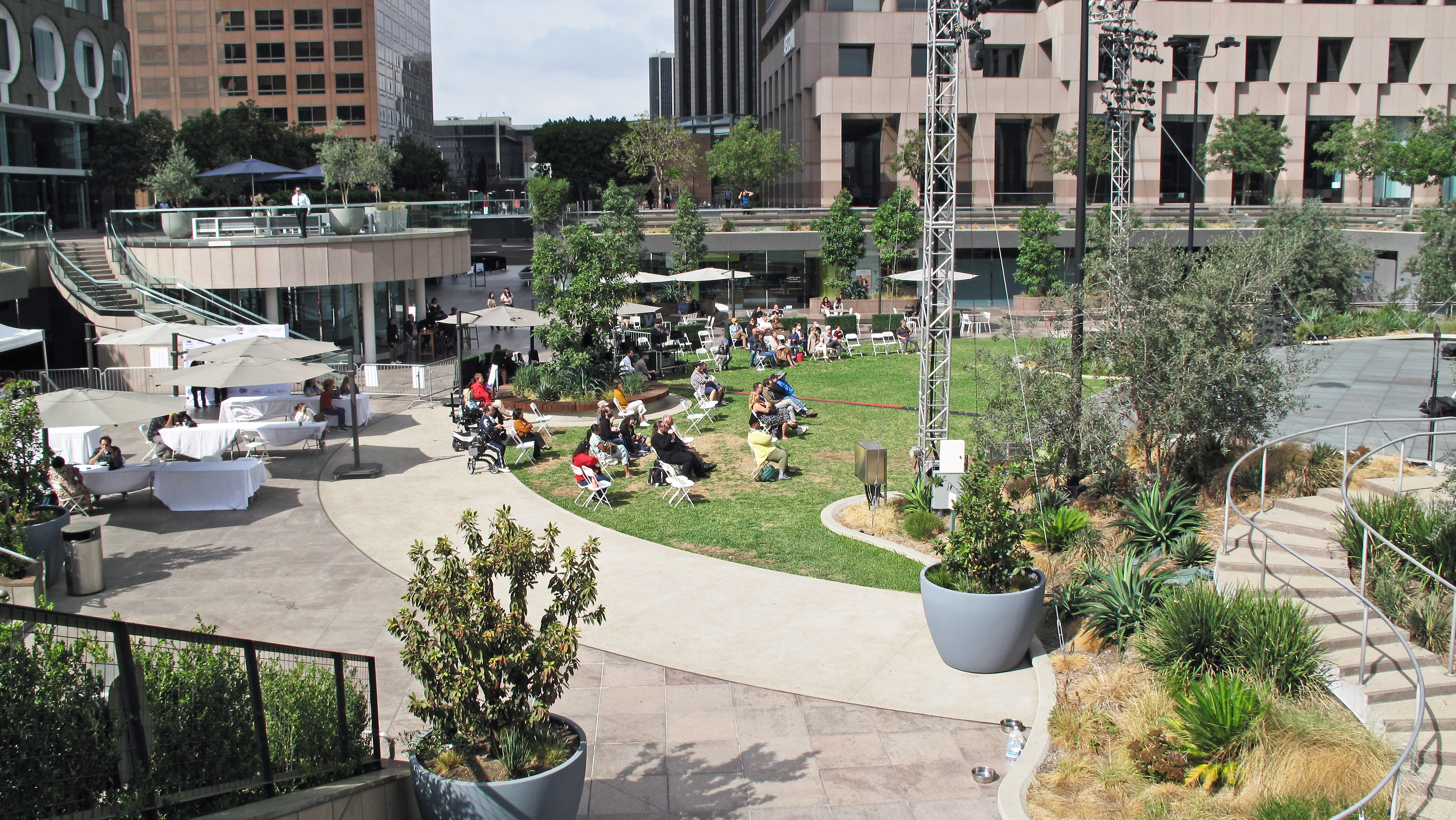
Looking down on California Plaza in October 2022. A film showing is in progress.

California Plaza is a business office and commercial complex in the Bunker Hill District of downtown Los Angeles, California. It consists of two skyscrapers, 1 Cal Plaza and 2Cal, previously named One California Plaza and Two California Plaza. The plaza is also home to the Los Angeles Museum of Contemporary Art (MoCA), Colburn School of Performing Arts, the Los Angeles Omni Hotel, and an entertainment/park plaza. A third tower, Three California Plaza was also planned. It would've been a 950-foot (290 m) tall tower, but was later scrapped in the 1990s due to a lack of financing.

== 1 Cal Plaza ==
- 1 Cal Plaza, 300 South Grand Avenue, Los Angeles

== 2Cal ==
- 2Cal, 350 South Grand Avenue, Los Angeles

== In popular culture ==
Many films and television shows feature or have been filmed at California Plaza, including: 2012, Fight Club, Heat, Lucifer, and more.
