= J. W. Eddy =

American politician

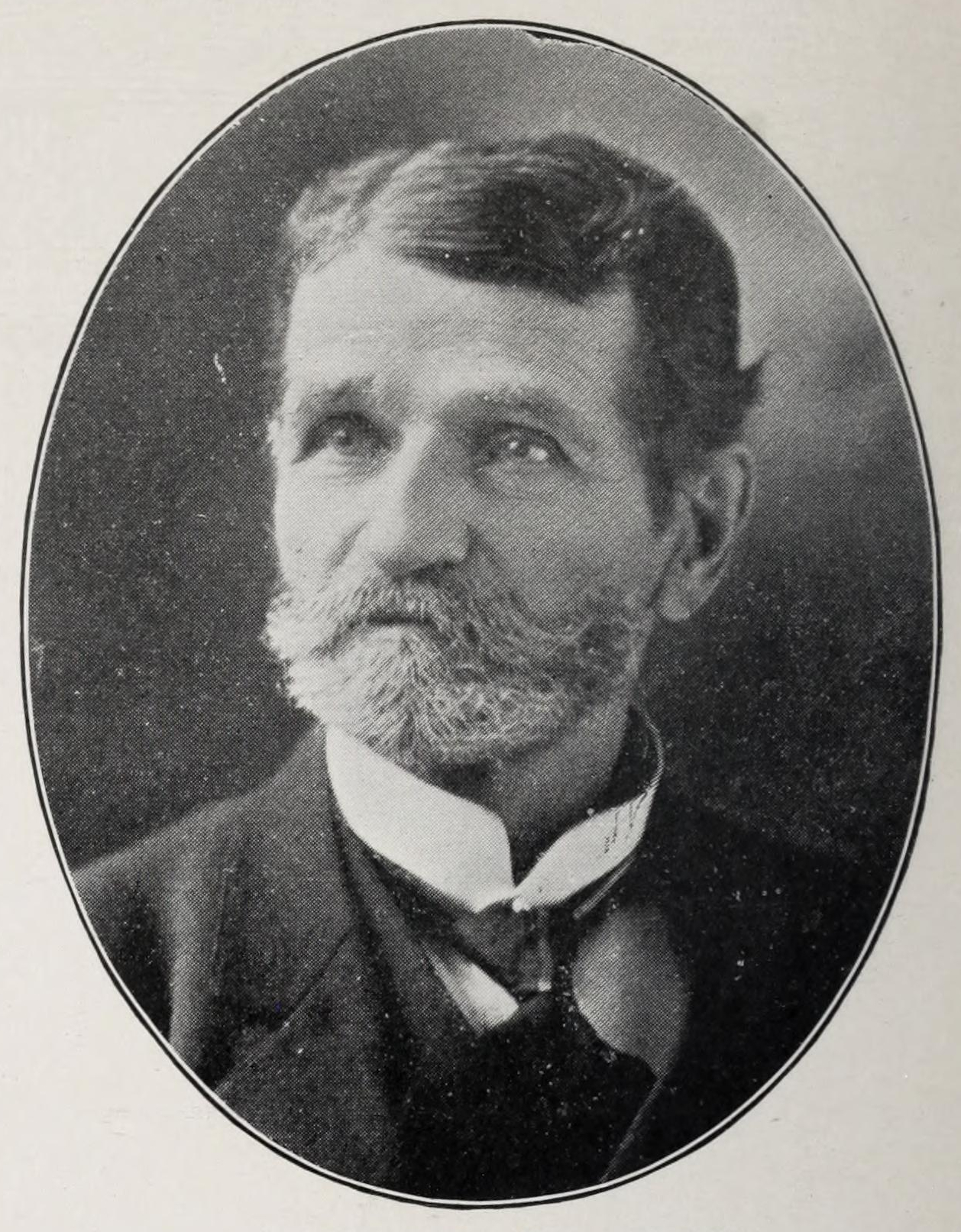
Eddy c. 1901

Colonel James Ward Eddy (May 30, 1832 – April 12, 1916) was the builder of Angels Flight funicular railroad in Los Angeles, California.

== Biography ==
Eddy was born in Java, New York and matriculated at Genesee College in Lima, New York. He taught school in western New York before going to Illinois in 1853, where he studied law and was admitted to the bar in Chicago in 1855.

He practiced in Batavia, Illinois, where he also served on the Board of Education and as a county supervisor. In 1866, he was elected to the Illinois House of Representatives, and in 1870 to the Illinois Senate.

Eddy was a friend and supporter of Abraham Lincoln. He was in Washington, D.C. when the Civil War broke out, and enlisted in Cassius M. Clay and Gen. James H. Lane's battalion which was formed for the protection of Washington during the first month of the war.

Eddy spent three years in railroad construction in Arizona, founding the Arizona Mineral Belt Railroad in 1881 to build a branch of the Santa Fe road south from the town of Flagstaff.

He moved to Los Angeles in 1895, where he settled and surveyed the first transmission line for water power from Kern River to Los Angeles, which was later obtained and used by the Pacific Electric Railroad Company of Los Angeles. In 1901 Eddy developed and built Angels Flight without public financing. The funicular system of two counterbalanced cars traveled up and down parallel tracks and transported passengers along the steep grade between Third and Hill Streets and Bunker Hill, where Eddy lived. The ride lasted one minute and cost one cent. He sold Angels Flight in 1912 and retired to Eagle Rock.

Eddy served as vice-president of the California Children's Home, president of the Los Angeles Orthopedic Hospital, and was a member of the Chamber of Commerce.

He was married to Isabella A. Worsley, of Batavia, Illinois, until her death in 1896. In 1900 he married Jane M. Wiswell, a native of Vermont. She died in 1913.

Col. Eddy died on April 12, 1916, at his Eagle Rock home at the age of 84. He is buried at Hollywood Forever Cemetery in a family plot with his first wife, Isabella, his second wife, Jane, and his children, Carrie Eddy Sheffler (1858–1927) and George Eddy (1868–1891).
