= Angels Flight =

Funicular railway in Los Angeles, California

- Angels Flight Railway
- U.S. National Register of Historic Places
- Los Angeles Historic-Cultural Monument
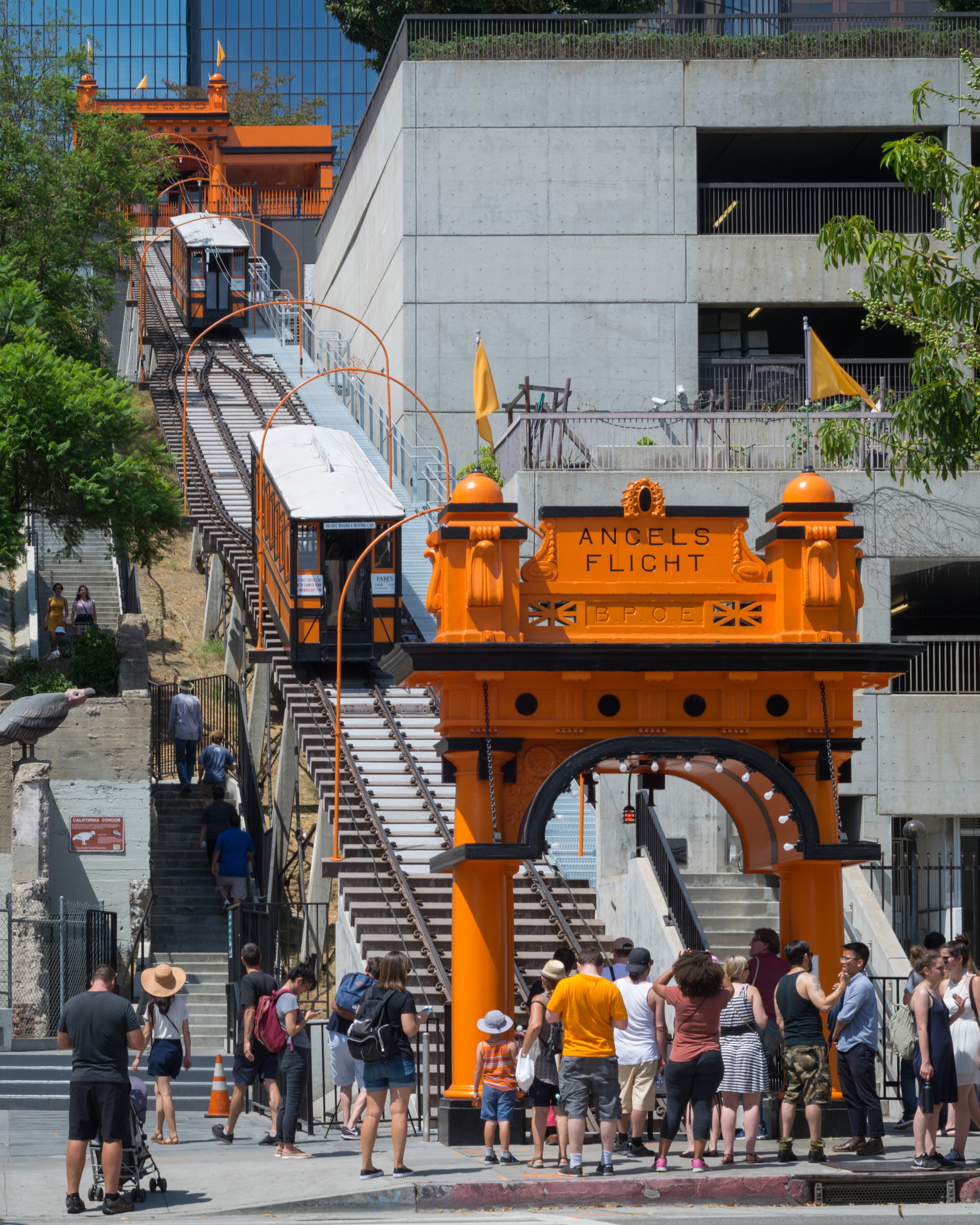
- Angels Flight in 2017

- Location within the Los Angeles metropolitan area Location within California Location within the United States
- Location: Hill Street, Los Angeles, California
- Coordinates: 34°3′4.82″N 118°15′0.76″W
- Built: 1901
- Architects: Merceau Bridge & Construction Co. Train & Williams
- Architectural style: Beaux-Arts
- Website: angelsflight.org
- NRHP reference No.: 00001168
- LAHCM No.: 4

Significant dates
- Added to NRHP: October 13, 2000
- Designated LAHCM: August 6, 1962

Angels Flight is a historic 2 ft 6 in (762 mm) narrow-gauge funicular railway in the Bunker Hill district of Downtown Los Angeles, California. It has two funicular cars, named Olivet and Sinai, that run in opposite directions on a shared cable. The tracks cover a distance of 298 feet (91 m) over a vertical gain of 96 feet (29 m).

The funicular has operated on two different sites, using the same cars and station elements. The original location, with trackage along the side of Third Street Tunnel and connecting Hill Street and Olive Street, operated from 1901 until 1969, when its site was cleared for redevelopment.

The current location opened half a block south of the original location in 1996, mid-block between 3rd and 4th Streets, with tracks connecting Hill Street and California Plaza. It was shut down in 2001 following a fatal accident and reopened in 2010. It was closed again during June and July 2011, and then again after a minor derailment incident in September 2013. The investigation of this latter incident led to the discovery of potentially serious safety problems in both the design and the operation of the funicular.

Before the 2013 service suspension, the cost of a one-way ride was 50 cents (25 cents for Metro pass holders). Although it was marketed primarily as a tourist novelty, it was frequently used by local workers to travel between the Downtown Historic Core and Bunker Hill. In 2015, the executive director of the nearby REDCAT arts center described the railroad as an important "economic link," and there was pressure for the city to fund and re-open the railroad. After safety enhancements were completed, Angels Flight reopened for public service in August 2017, charging $1 for a one-way ride (50 cents for TAP card users). In June 2025, citing increased operating costs, the fare was increased to $1.50 for a one-way fare and $3 for a round trip fare (75 cents for TAP card users).

== History ==
=== Original location ===
Angels Flight funicular was built as the "Los Angeles Incline Railway" in 1901, with financing from J. W. Eddy. It began at the west corner of Hill Street at Third, and ran for two blocks uphill (northwestward) to its Olive Street terminus. The service consisted of two "boarding stations" and two cars, named Sinai and Olivet, alternately pulled up the steep incline by metal cables powered by engines at the upper Olive Street station. The downhill car descended by gravity alone. An archway labeled "Angels Flight" greeted passengers on the Hill Street entrance, which became the official name of the railway in 1912 when the Funding Company of California purchased it from Eddy.

The original Angels Flight was a conventional funicular, with both cars connected to the same haulage cable and no track brakes in case of cable failure; a separate safety cable would be activated in a break. It operated for 68 years with a good safety record, with three notable incidents: a derailment with a single female passenger in 1913, a sleeping salesman being dragged several yards by a car in 1937, and a sailor walking up the tracks being killed in 1943.

A total of seven companies operated the railroad at its original location. In 1912 Colonel Eddy sold it to the Funding Company of Los Angeles, which sold it to Continental Securities Company in 1914. Robert W. Moore, an engineer for Continental Securities, and the railway's general manager since 1914, purchased the line in 1946. In 1952, Moore retired, and sold Angels Flight to Lester B. Moreland, an electrical engineer with the Los Angeles Department of Water and Power, and Byron Linville, a prominent banker at Security First National Bank. Moore had gotten to know Moreland and Linville over his many years and believed the pair were earnest about preserving the history of the railway and capably maintaining its operation. The following year Moreland's family bought out Linville's interest and became sole stockholder. In 1962 condemnation proceedings instigated by Los Angeles forced Moreland to sell to the city, whose redevelopment agency hired Oliver & Williams Elevator Company to run the line until it was shut down on May 18, 1969. Dismantling began the following day, and the cars were hauled off to a warehouse. The railroad's arch, station house, drinking fountain, and other artifacts were taken to an outdoor storage yard in Gardena, California.

In November 1952, the Beverly Hills Parlor of the Native Daughters of the Golden West erected a plaque to commemorate fifty years of service by the railway. The plaque reads:

Built in 1901 by Colonel J. W. Eddy, lawyer, engineer, and friend of President Abraham Lincoln, Angels Flight is said to be the world's shortest incorporated railway. The counterbalanced cars, controlled by cables, travel a 33 percent grade for 315 feet. It is estimated that Angels Flight has carried more passengers per mile than any other railway in the world, over a hundred million in its first fifty years. This incline railway is a public utility operating under a franchise granted by the City of Los Angeles.

In 1962, the city's new Cultural Heritage Board (today its Cultural Heritage Commission) designated five sites it regarded as "threatened" as Los Angeles Historic-Cultural Monuments, with Angel's Flight listed as No. 4.

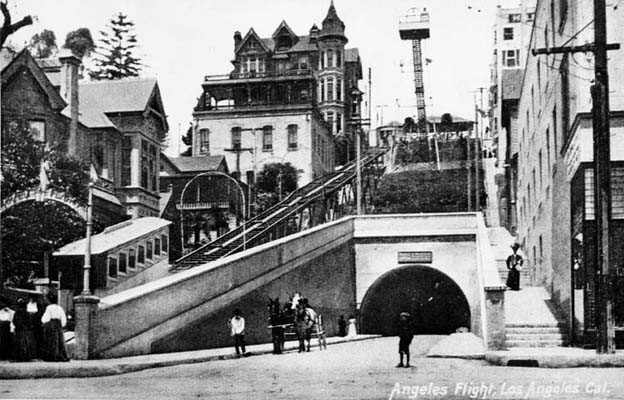
Low end view of the original Angels Flight with the 3rd Street Tunnel and an observation tower, c. 1905.

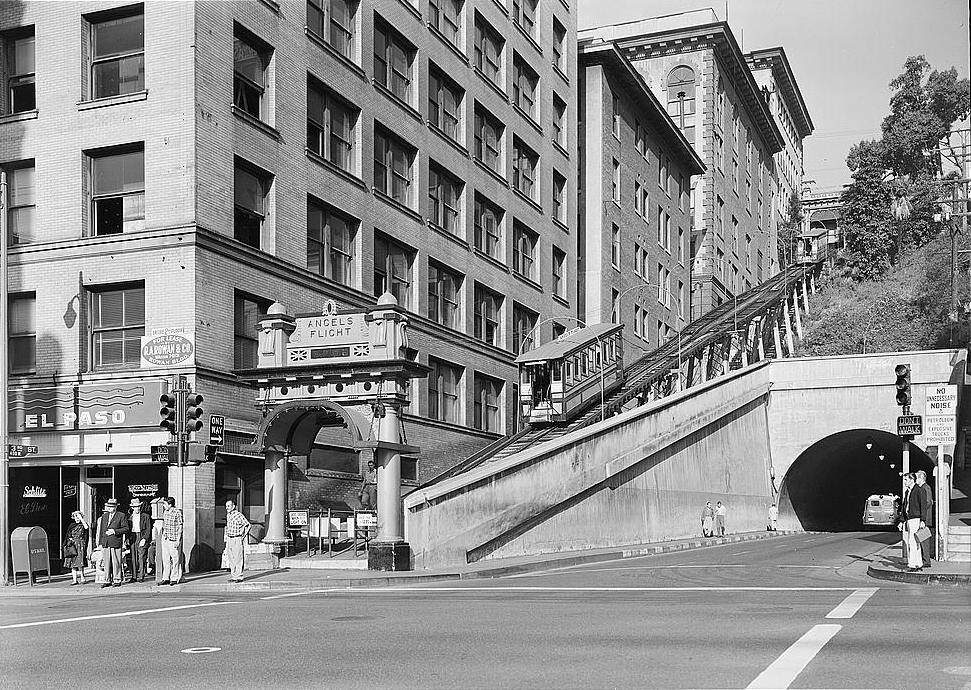
Low end view of the original Angels Flight with the 3rd Street Tunnel, 1960.

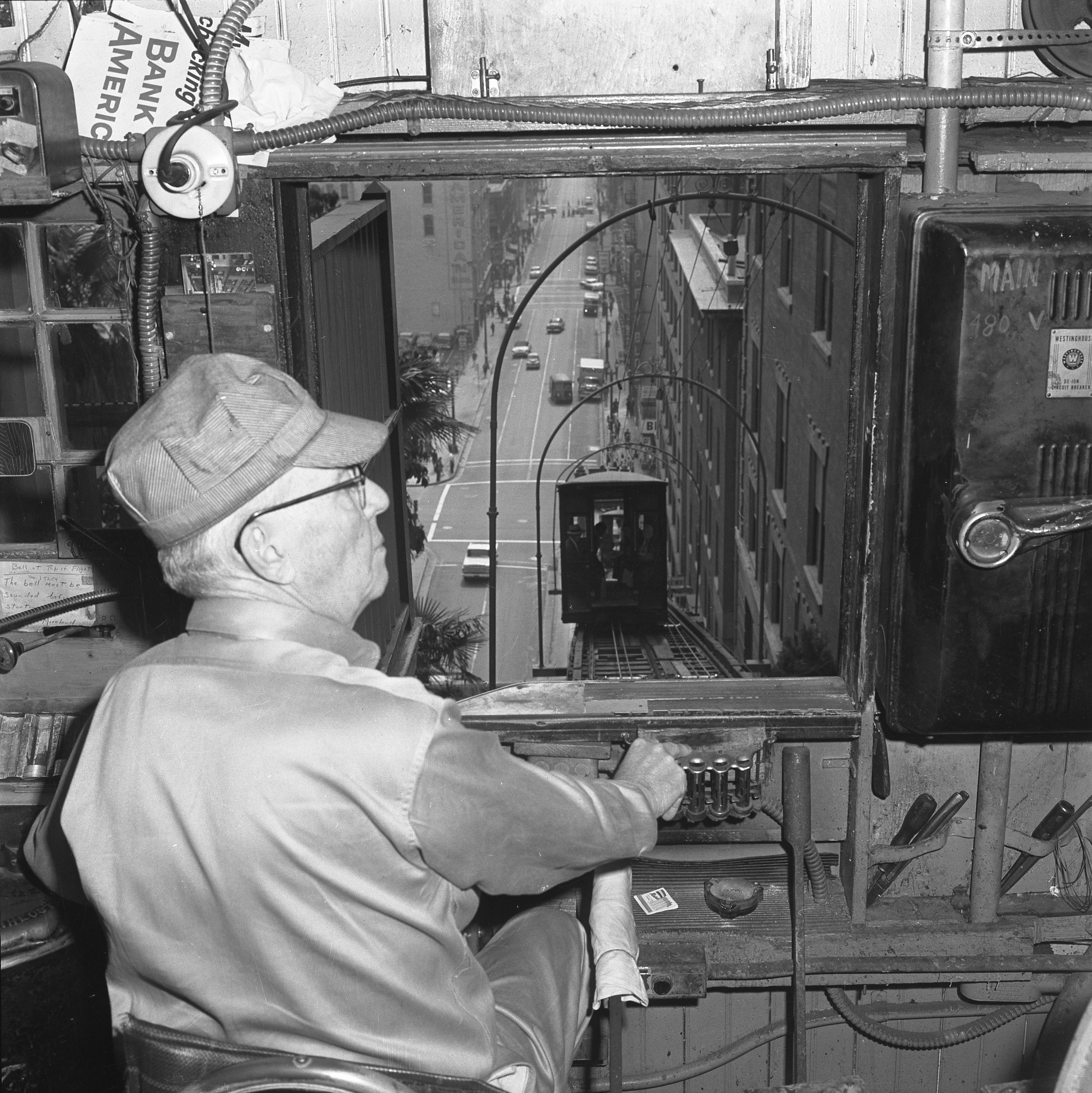
Joseph M. Cooper operating an Angels Flight car, 1960.

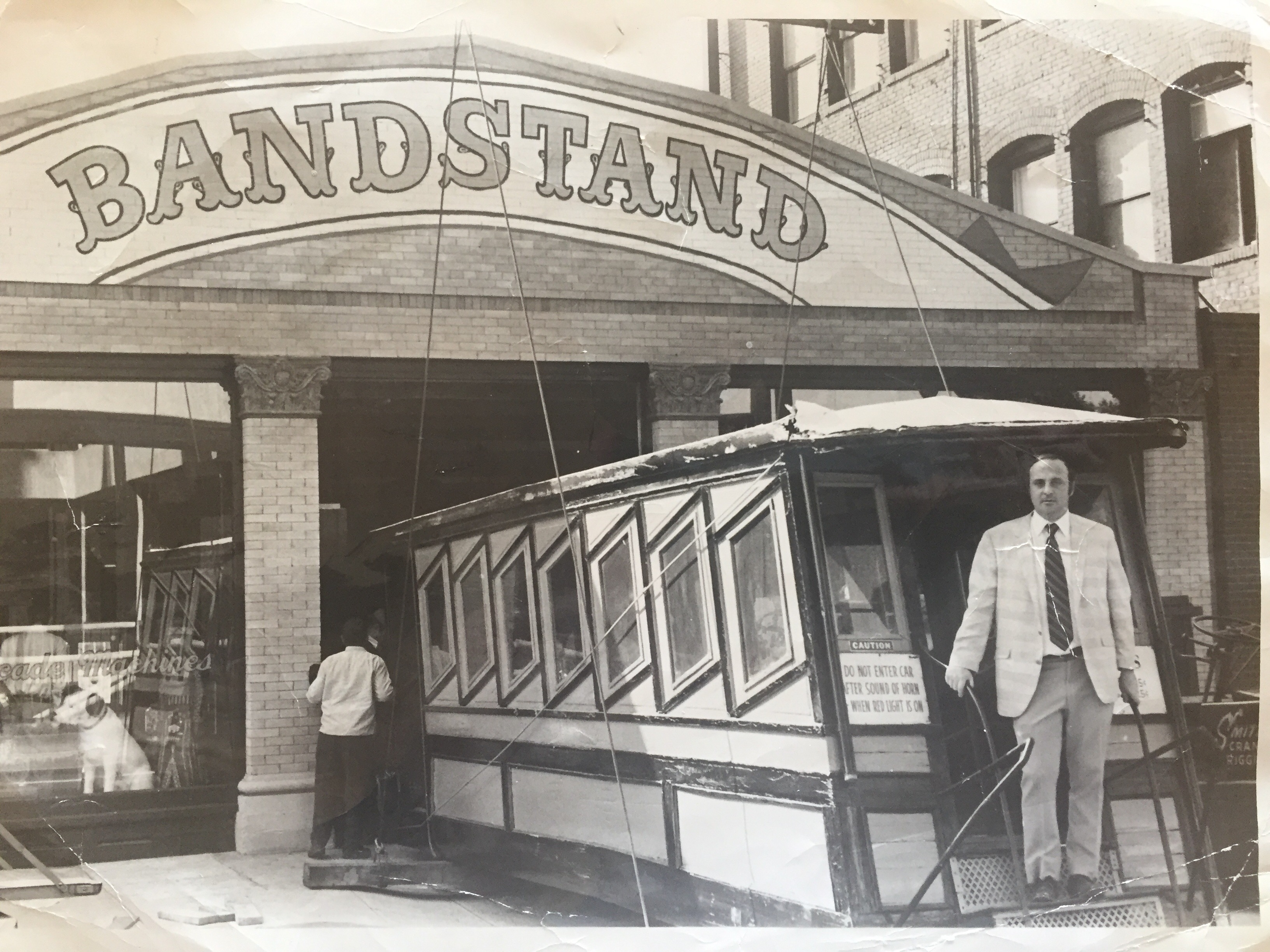
Sid Kastner standing on Sinai in front of "The Bandstand," where the two funicular cars were stored, 1969.

=== Dismantling ===
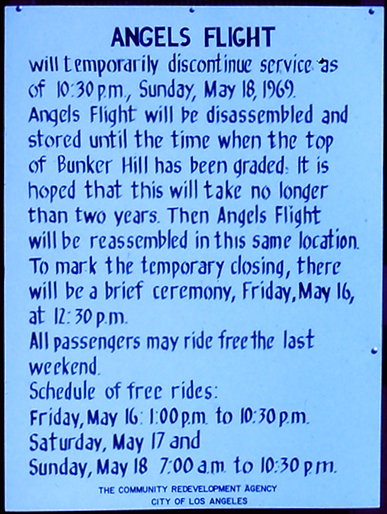
1969 sign posted before the railway was "temporarily" closed.

The railway was closed on May 17 or May 18, 1969, when the Bunker Hill area underwent a controversial total redevelopment, which destroyed and displaced a community of almost 9.000 working-class residents who were renting rooms in architecturally significant but run-down buildings; the demolished residences were replaced with a contemporary mixed-use district of high-rise commercial buildings and modern apartment and condominium complexes. Both of the Angels Flight cars, Sinai and Olivet, were then placed in storage at 1200 S. Olive Street, Los Angeles. This was the location of Sid and Linda Kastner's United Business Interiors. At this location, the Kastners maintained "The Bandstand," a private museum. The Bandstand featured antique, coin-operated musical instruments where one of the cars (Sinai) was on display in the museum. Olivet was stored in the garage of the building. They were stored at this location at no charge in anticipation of the railway's restoration and reopening, which according to the city's Redevelopment Agency, was originally slated to take place within two years.

=== Reconstruction ===
After being stored for almost 27 years, the funicular was rebuilt and reopened by the newly formed Angels Flight Railway Foundation on February 24, 1996, half a block south of the original site. Although the original cars, Sinai and Olivet, were used, a new track and haulage system was designed and built—a redesign which had unfortunate consequences five years later. As rebuilt, the funicular retained its general 300 feet (91 meters) length and approximately 33% grade.

As with the original line, car movement was controlled by an operator inside the upper station house, who was responsible for visually determining that the track and vehicles were clear for movement, closing the platform gates, starting the cars moving, monitoring the operation of the funicular cars, observing car stops at both stations, and collecting fares from passengers. The cars themselves did not carry any staff members. Angels Flight was added to the National Register of Historic Places on October 13, 2000.

=== 2001 accident ===
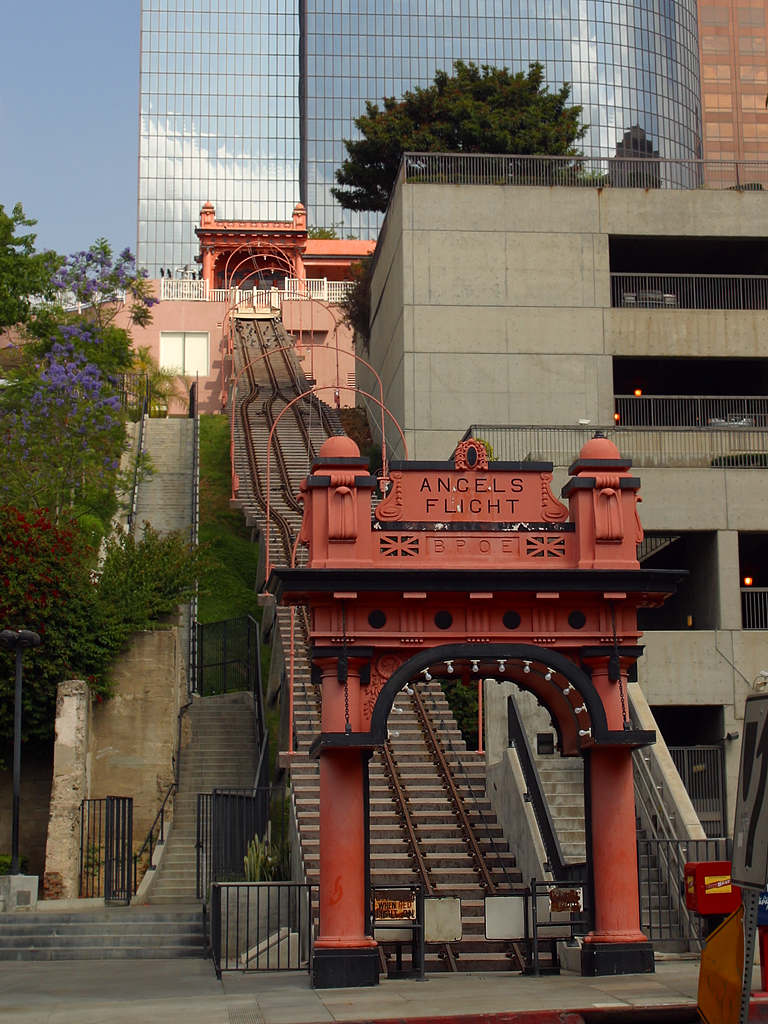
Low end view of Angels Flight during closure period while cars were placed in storage after an accident, 2004.

On February 1, 2001, Angels Flight had a serious accident when car Sinai, approaching the upper station, instead rolled downhill uncontrollably, and collided into Olivet near the lower station. The accident killed an 83-year-old man, injured his wife and seven others, and caused serious damage to the funicular.

The National Transportation Safety Board (NTSB) conducted an investigation into the accident, and determined that the probable cause was the improper design and construction of the funicular drive, and the failure of the various regulatory bodies to ensure that the railway system conformed to initial safety design specifications and known funicular safety standards. The NTSB further remarked that the company that designed and built the drive, control, braking, and haul systems, Lift Engineering/Yantrak, was no longer in business, and that the whereabouts of the company's principal was unknown.

Unlike the original design, which had a safety cable, track brakes, and the cars connected to one-another to counter-balance their loads, the new arrangement used a separate haulage system for each car, with its drive motor connected to its service brake by a gear train. When Sinai's gear train failed it had no service brake or balancing load, either of which would have prevented the accident. Compounding this, emergency brakes that acted on the rim of each haulage drum were inoperative on both cars due to inadequate maintenance. The NTSB was unable to identify another funicular worldwide that operated without either a safety cable or track brakes.

Records indicate that the emergency brake had been inoperative for 17 to 26 months following the mis-installation of a normally closed hydraulic solenoid valve in place of a normally open one, which had burned out.

During the period that the emergency braking system was not operating, the braking system was tested daily – using a faulty methodology which engaged the service brake and emergency brake simultaneously, leaving no way to tell if the emergency brake was functioning without looking at the brake pads or hydraulic pressure gauges during the test. It was always performed with the Sinai car traveling uphill, which meant that when the power was cut and the brakes applied (as part of the test), Sinai's momentum caused the car to continue moving uphill a short distance (slackening the cable) and then to roll back from gravity, jerking the cable tight.

If the emergency brakes had been functional, they would have caught the car when the cable snapped tight, but without them the force of the daily jerk caused by the test was directed through the gear train's spline (that ultimately failed) and then to the service brake. In addition, it was found that the original design called for the spline to be made of AISI 1018 steel on one drawing and of AISI 8822 steel on a different one, but it is unlikely that this ambiguity in the design contributed to the accident. However, regular analysis of gear box oil-samples was discontinued in May 1998, despite the company contracted to perform the tests advising that the rising particulate level in the samples warranted more frequent testing.

Besides the design failures in the haulage system, the Angels Flight setup was also criticized by the NTSB for the lack of gates on the cars and the absence of a parallel walkway for emergency evacuation.

==== Evaluation ====
The death and injuries could have been avoided if any one of the following had taken place:

- The 1996 renovation had included installing track brakes or safety cables.
- The biennial oil analysis tests had not been discontinued in May 1998 (which would have shown rising levels of particulate material in the oil, and may have caused a full inspection of the system to take place).
- A single haulage system, similar to the first Angels Flight, had been used, rather than the system that had separate cables for each car.
- The emergency brake hydraulic solenoid valve had been installed according to the design (as normally open). But if the brake fluid had been changed as instructed in the maintenance manual, this accident would not have happened.
- The technician installing the solenoid had obtained a properly fitting part, instead of forcing it in with a tool, once he discovered the solenoid did not properly fit the valve. (The installed valve was a newer design, for which the older solenoid was dimensionally incompatible, and tool marks on the solenoid show that it was forced in.)
- The daily brake test had included testing the service brake and emergency brake separately, instead of testing them simultaneously (which made it impossible to confirm that they were both working).
- The daily brake test procedure had included looking at the brake pads and the hydraulic pressure in the emergency brake system to confirm it was operating.
- The pressure gauges for the hydraulic brake systems had been placed on the operator's control panel instead of in the equipment cabinet.
- The daily brake test had involved applying the brakes more gradually, so that the up-hill-bound car would not have the momentum to produce slack in the cable and roll backwards, jerking the cable tight.
- The splines (the part that failed) had been designed to be extraordinarily strong to withstand the excessive force that occurred when the brake test was performed while the emergency brake was inoperative (which resulted in the force of the cable being pulled tight to be directed to the service brake through the splines, rather than to the emergency brake, which was before the splines).

=== Repair ===
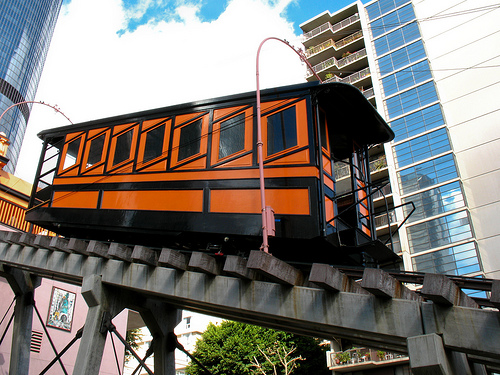
An Angels Flight car, 2008

On November 1, 2008, both of the repaired and restored Angels Flight cars, Sinai and Olivet, were put back on their tracks, and on January 16, 2009, testing began on the railway. On November 20, 2009, another step in the approval process was achieved. Finally, on March 10, 2010, the California Public Utilities Commission (CPUC) approved the safety certificate for the railroad to begin operating again.

The new drive and safety system completely replaced the faulty system that was the cause of the fatal 2001 accident. Like the original Angels Flight design and most traditional funicular systems, the new drive system incorporates a single main haulage cable, with one car attached to each end. Also like the original design, a second safety cable is utilized. To further enhance safety, unlike the original design, each car now has a rail brake system, as a backup to the main backup emergency brakes on each bull-wheel. Another added safety feature is an independent evacuation motor to move the cars should the main motor fail for any reason.

=== Reopening and temporary closing ===
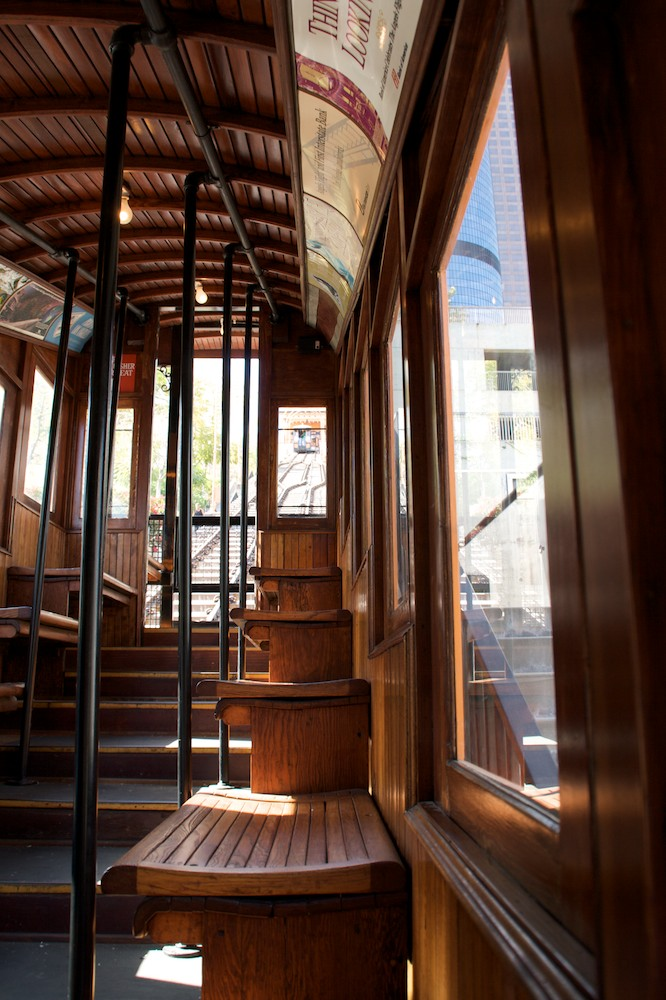
The interior of a renovated Angels Flight car, 2010

Angels Flight reopened to the public for riding on March 15, 2010, and local media covered the event with interest. Only a month after re-opening, Angels Flight had had over 59,000 riders. It connected the Historic Core and Broadway commercial district with the hilltop Bunker Hill California Plaza urban park and the Museum of Contemporary Art – MOCA. The cost of a one-way ride at that time was 50 cents (25 cents with TAP card).

On June 10, 2011, the California Public Utilities Commission ordered Angels Flight to immediately cease operations due to wear on its cars' fifteen-year-old wheels. Inspectors determined they needed replacing. The railway reopened on July 5, 2011, after eight new custom-made wheels were installed.

=== 2013 accident ===
On September 5, 2013, one car derailed near the middle of the guideway. One passenger was on board the derailed car, and five passengers were on board the other car. Although there were no injuries, passengers had to be rescued from the cars by firefighters. The brake safety system had been "intentionally" bypassed using a small tree branch. A 2014 brief by the NTSB said that the "probable cause of the September 5, 2013, accident was the intentional bypass of the funicular safety system with Angels Flight management knowledge; and Angels Flight management continuation of revenue operations despite prolonged, and repeated, unidentified system safety shutdowns." The NTSB also noted a problem with the basic design: "The car body and the wheel-axle assembly are not articulated." The passing section of the track involves a short turning section, which allows the cars to pass each other. The axles did not turn to follow the track, resulting in the wheel flanges grinding against the rail, causing excessive wheel wear. This problem, combined with safety system problems which caused unwanted track brake deployment, resulted in a derailment.

=== 2017 reopening ===
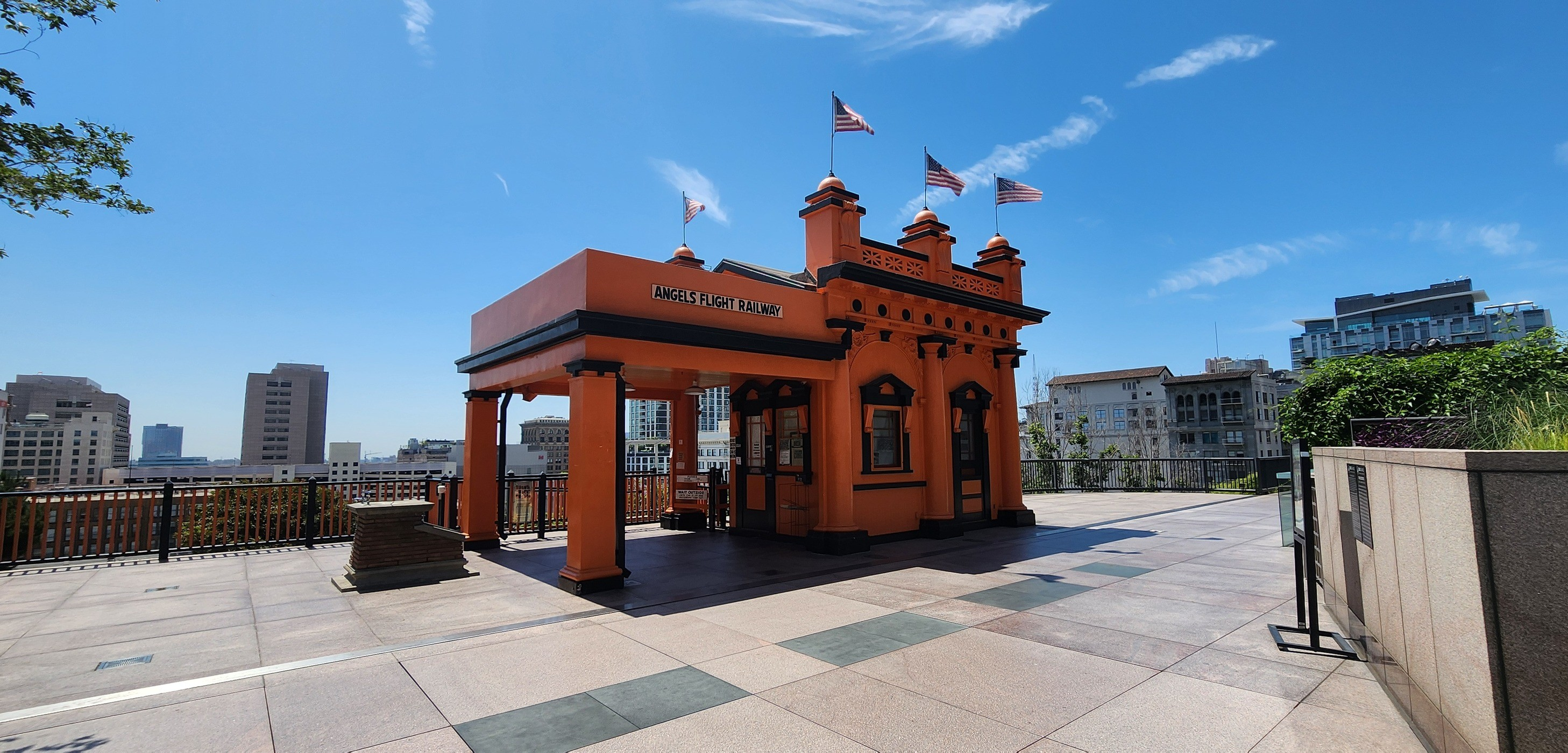
Angels Flight Railway Station in July, 2024.

Plans to bring the railway back into service began in January 2017. Safety upgrades were made to the doors of the cars, and an evacuation walkway was added adjacent to the track. These enhancements were made by ACS Infrastructure Development and SENER through an agreement with Angels Flight Railway Foundation, in exchange for a share of the funicular's revenue over the next three decades. Angels Flight reopened for public service on August 31, 2017.

== In popular culture ==
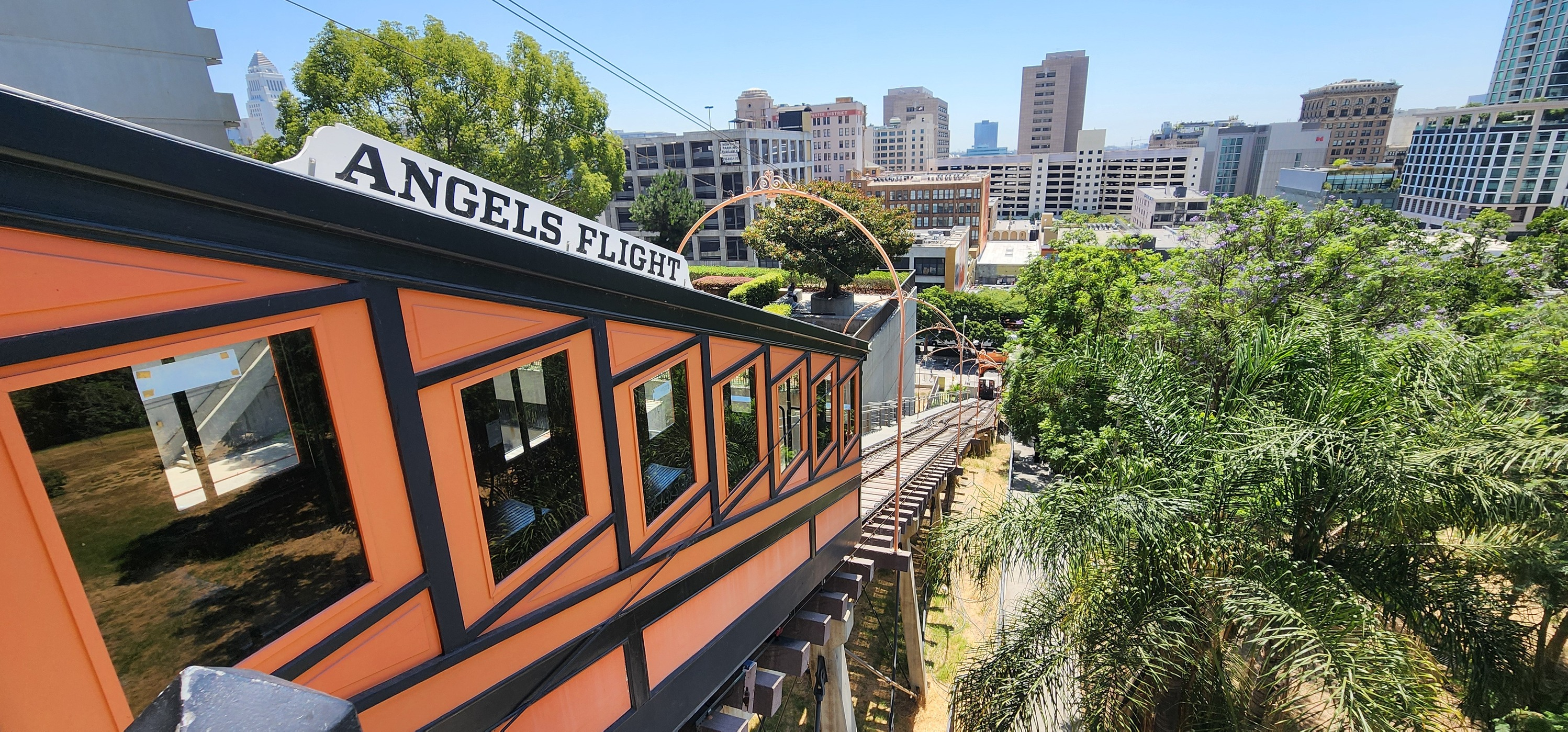
Angels Flight in August, 2024.

=== Film, television, and video ===
Angels Flight has appeared in more than 67 films, television shows, music videos -- even two video games. Angels Flight's earliest appearance on film is believed to be Their Ups and Downs (1914), starring Eddie Lyons, Victoria Forde, and Lee Moran. Other early appearances include: Good Night, Nurse (1916) starring Neal Burns and Stella Adams, All Jazzed Up (1920), The Impatient Maiden (1932), The Unfaithful (1940), Hollow Triumph (1948), M (1951), The Turning Point (1952), Cry of the Hunted (1953), Bunker Hill: A Tale of Urban Renewal (1956), The Exiles (1961), The Money Trap (1965), Angel's Flight (1965), and They Came to Rob Las Vegas (1968). It appeared as a landmark rather than an active filming location in the Night Has a Thousand Eyes (1948), Criss Cross (1949), The Glenn Miller Story (1954), Kiss Me Deadly (1955), Indestructible Man (1956), and The Incredibly Strange Creatures Who Stopped Living and Became Mixed-Up Zombies (1963). Angels Flight Railway (1969) and The Last Day of Angels Flight (1969) both center on the railway's closure in 1969.The Muppets in 2011 before it closed again in 2013. It reopened for a single day to serve as a filming location for La La Land (2016), after which safety officials barred it from use as a filming location. It was reopened for public use in 2017, and can be seen in The Saint.

The railway is present in a 1953 episode of Boston Blackie, and in the only color episode of the original Perry Mason, "The Case of the Twice-Told Twist" in 1966. It also appears in the Amazon Studios show Bosch (2018), which is based on Michael Connelly's book Angels Flight.

Other television show appearances include: in the 1969 episode Narcotics DR-21 of Dragnet, The Biggest Loser (2010), The Bold and the Beautiful (2010), and in the Runaways episode "Old School" (2018). The original Angels Flight is featured in the Perry Mason remake (2020).

Angels Flight appears as an interactive component of the video games Tony Hawk's American Wasteland (2005) and L.A. Noire (2011).

=== Literature, visual arts, and music ===
The first book to be named Angel's Flight in reference to the railway may be Don Ryan's 1927 novel. It is used by characters in Raymond Chandler's The High Window (1942); in Verne Chute's Flight of an Angel (1946), in Michael Connelly's 1999 Angels Flight; and in Nick Carter's 1967 The Red Guard. The railway is illustrated and at the center of events in Piccolo's Prank by Leo Politi. Millard Sheets' 1931 oil painting Angel's Flight, which shows two young women on the looking down from the upper platform, is in the Los Angeles County Museum of Art's permanent collection. Other artists who've painted Angels Flight include Ben Abril, Marcel Cavalla, Ralph Hulett, Emil Kosa, Jr., Jake Lee, Stanton Manolakas, Kay Martin, and Paul Youngman.

The funicular is referenced in "L.A. (My Town)" by Four Tops (1970), "Strange Season" by Michael Penn (1992), and "Aquatic Mouth Dance" by the Red Hot Chili Peppers (2022). The music video for "Icy" (2019) by ITZY contains dance scenes inside the Angels Flight. Michael Penn's album Free-for-All (2019) shows Angels Flight on the cover.

== See also ==
- Angels Landing (Los Angeles) (adjacent)
- List of funicular railways
- List of heritage railroads in the United States
- List of Los Angeles Historic-Cultural Monuments in Downtown Los Angeles
- National Register of Historic Places listings in Los Angeles
