= Arizona Mineral Belt Railroad =

The Arizona Mineral Belt Railroad was a nineteenth-century United States company founded by businessman James Ward Eddy in 1881, with the hope of connecting northern and southern Arizona. It did not create a finished railway line before being dissolved.

== Background ==
By the late nineteenth century, the US state of Arizona was experiencing a flush of pioneer development. A railroad line had been laid across northern Arizona by Atchison, Topeka and Santa Fe Railway, connecting that end of the state with national and worldwide opportunities. The southern part of Arizona had also attracted miners to its silver and copper deposits. But it had no direct connection to the nation's railway system, and it was geographically isolated by the southern edge of the Colorado Plateau, an elevated feature that is roughly centered on the Four Corners area of the southwest United States.

A businessman, James Eddy, realized that if a connection between the two areas were available, the northern ponderosa pine forests would help southern Arizona construction projects, which could produce silver and copper to pay for the commerce.

The greatest obstacle to such a railway line was the Mogollon Rim, a half-mile-high escarpment at the edge of the Colorado Plateau. Engineers contracted by Eddy determined that a tunnel of 3,100 feet (945m) length and 16 feet (4.88m) width through this Rim would allow laden trains to access the top of the Plateau. So in 1881, Eddy formed the Arizona Mineral Belt Railway Company, and began seeking investors.

== The Tunnel ==
Workers began blasting a tunnel into the Rim in 1883. By the end of the summer the available funds were exhausted but only 70 feet (21m) of tunnel had been completed. Eddy spent the next several years securing additional investment, which was used in laying 35 miles (56 km) of track south of Flagstaff. However, when that additional capital had been expended, Eddy gave up the project.

== At present ==
Over time, the 35 miles of track that were laid south of Flagstaff have been torn up by locals who reused the scrap. The only remaining evidence of Eddy's project is the partially completed tunnel deep in the Tonto National Forest.
