= 1 Cal Plaza =

Skyscraper in Los Angeles, California

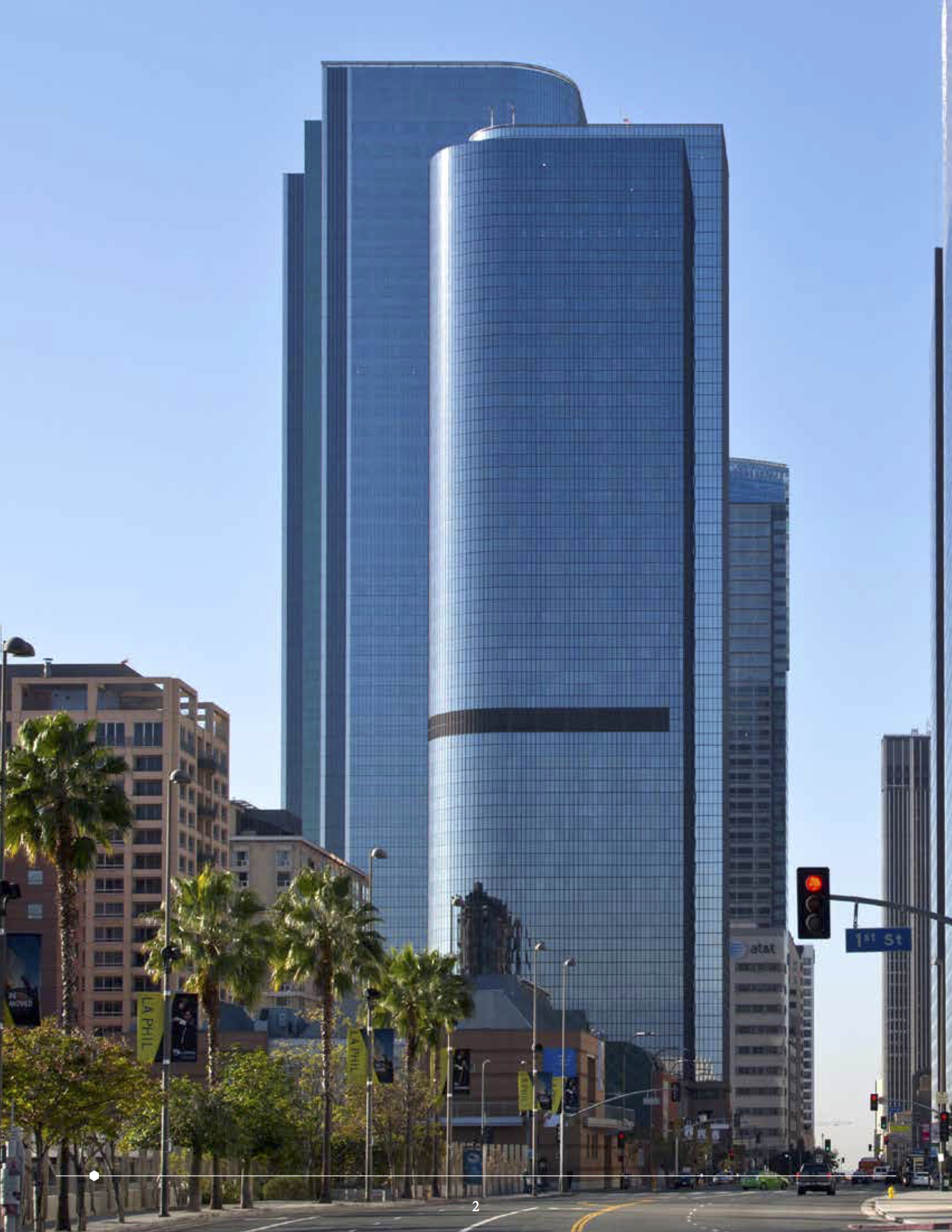
- 1 Cal Plaza, with the edge of 2Cal behind it to the left

General information
- Type: Commercial offices
- Location: 300 South Grand Avenue; Los Angeles, California
- Coordinates: 34°03′08″N 118°15′05″W
- Construction started: 1983
- Completed: 1985
- Owner: Partnership Between Rising Realty Partners & Colony Northstar, Inc.
- Operator: Rising Realty Partners

Height
- Roof: 176 m (577 ft)

Technical details
- Floor count: 42
- Floor area: 97,548 m^{2} (1,050,000 sq ft)
- Lifts/elevators: 28

Design and construction
- Architect: Arthur Erickson Architects
- Developer: Metropolitan Structures West
- Structural engineer: John A. Martin & Associates
- Main contractor: The Beck Group

1 Cal Plaza, formerly known as One California Plaza, is a 176-meter skyscraper located in the Bunker Hill District of downtown Los Angeles, California, United States. With a second skyscraper, Two California Plaza, it comprises the California Plaza project. The Plaza is also home to the Los Angeles Museum of Contemporary Art, Colburn School of Performing Arts, the Los Angeles Omni Hotel, Angels Flight and The Yard outdoor venue surrounded by the city’s skyline complete with a built-in stage, lighting, sound, and amphitheater seating. 1.5-acre (0.61 ha) .

Completed in 1985, One California Plaza has 1.05 million sq ft (98,000 m^{2}) of office space. The towers were designed by Arthur Erickson Architects and named BOMA Building of the Year in 1989. 1 Cal Plaza is LEED certified with a Platinum Certification and is also LEED Net Zero Certified.

California Plaza was a ten-year, $1.2 billion project. Started in 1983, the Two California Plaza tower was completed in 1992 during a significant slump in the downtown Los Angeles real estate market. The tower opened with only 30 percent of its space leased and overall vacancy rates in downtown office space neared 25 percent. It was nearly 10 years before significant tall buildings were completed again in downtown Los Angeles. Several clear shots of the building under construction can be seen in the 1983 action helicopter movie Blue Thunder.

California Plaza was originally planned to include three high rise tower office buildings instead of the two completed. Three California Plaza at 65 floors, was planned for a site just north of 4th Street, directly across Olive Street from California Plaza's first two office highrises and was planned to house the Metropolitan Water District's permanent headquarters.

The construction and $23 million cost of the MOCA Grand Avenue building was part of a city-brokered deal with the developer of the California Plaza redevelopment project, Bunker Hill Associates, which received the use of an 11-acre (4.5 ha), publicly owned parcel of land.

One California Plaza was purchased on June 6, 2017 by a partnership between Rising Realty Partners and Colony Northstar, Inc. In 2025, lenders forced California One into receivership under Trigild.

Tower One was featured in the Nickelodeon television show Drake & Josh as Spin City Records in the episode "Really Big Shrimp".

== See also ==
- List of tallest buildings in Los Angeles
