= Reliance, Inc. =

American steel manufacturing company

- Formerly: Reliance Steel & Aluminum Co.
- Type: Public company
- Traded as: NYSE: RS; S&P 400 component
- Industry: Metals, Metal fabrication
- Founded: February 3, 1939; 87 years ago in Los Angeles
- Founder: Thomas J. Neilan
- Headquarters: Scottsdale, Arizona, U.S.
- Key people: Karla R. Lewis (President & CEO); Arthur Ajemyan (CFO); Stephen P. Koch (Executive Vice President); William A. Smith II (General Counsel)
- Products: Aluminum; Brass; Alloy; Copper; Carbon steel Stainless steel Titanium
- Revenue: ▲US$14.3 billion (2025)
- Net income: ▼US$739 million (2025)
- Number of employees: ≈ 15,000 (December 2023)
- Website: reliance.com rsac.com

Reliance, Inc. (Reliance), headquartered in Scottsdale, Arizona, is the largest metals service center operator in North America. The company provides metals processing services and distributes a line of approximately 100,000 metal products, including aluminum, brass, alloy, copper, carbon steel, stainless steel, titanium, and specialty metal products to 125,000 customers such as fabricators and manufacturers.

The company is ranked 309th on the Fortune 500 (2025). In 2023, the company was ranked 247th.

The company network includes over 75 brands, including Phoenix Metals, United Pipe & Steel, Allegheny Steel Distributors, Best Manufacturing, CCC Steel, Delta Steel, EMJ, Feralloy, Infra-Metals Co., KMS Fab LLC and KMS South, Liebovich, Metals USA, National Specialty Alloys, Pacific Metal, Reliance Metalcenter, Siskin Steel, Tube Service, Valex, and Yarde Metals.

== History ==
The company was founded in Los Angeles on February 3, 1939 by Thomas J. Neilan. Originally named Reliance Steel Products Company, the business made and sold steel reinforcing bars (rebar) for the construction industry. In 1944, the name was shortened to Reliance Steel Company.

On September 14, 1994, the company became a public company via an initial public offering.

Reliance Steel & Aluminum Co. changed the company name to Reliance, Inc. on February 15, 2024.

=== Acquisitions ===
| Year | Company | Price | Description of Assets | Ref(s). |
|---|---|---|---|---|
| 1997 | Service Steel Aerospace | Undisclosed | Facilities in California, Connecticut, Kansas, Ohio, and Washington | |
| 2001 | Pitt-Des Moines | $97.5 million | Seven distribution centers in California, Nevada, Utah, Washington and Iowa | |
| 2002 | Central Plains Steel | Undisclosed | A facility in Wichita | |
| 2003 | Precision Strip | $246 million | Facilities in Minster, Kenton, Middletown, and Tipp City, Ohio; Anderson and Rockport, Indiana; Bowling Green, Kentucky and Talladega, Alabama | |
| 2006 | Earle M. Jorgensen | $984 million | 39 facilities in the United States and Canada | |
| 2008 | PNA Group | $1.1 Billion | 23 steel service centers throughout the United States, as well as five joint ventures with seven additional service centers in the United States and Mexico | |
| 2008 | Dynamic Metals International | Undisclosed | $11 million in annual sales | |
| 2010 | Diamond Consolidated Industries | Undisclosed | Four service centers (Wyoming, PA; Michigan City, IN; Cedar Hill, TX; Charlotte, NC) | |
| 2010 | Lampros Steel | Undisclosed | Steel service center company specializing in structural steel shapes with a facility located in Portland, Oregon | |
| 2011 | Continental Alloy | Undisclosed | 12 locations in 7 countries including the United States, Canada, United Kingdom, Singapore, Malaysia, Dubai and Mexico | |
| 2012 | McKey Perforating | Undisclosed | Contract manufacturer | |
| 2012 | National Specialty Alloys | Undisclosed | Locations in Houston, Texas, Anaheim, California, Buford, Georgia and Tulsa, Oklahoma | |
| 2012 | Assets of Airport Metals (Australia) | Undisclosed | Stocking distributor of aircraft materials and supplies | |
| 2012 | Sunbelt Steel Texas | Undisclosed | Distributor of special alloy steel bar and heavy-wall tubing products to the oil and gas industry | |
| 2012 | GH Metal Solutions | Undisclosed | High value add processor of metal products | |
| 2013 | Metals USA | $1.24 billion | 48 service centers strategically located throughout the United States | |
| 2013 | Haskins Steel | Undisclosed | Processor and distributor of carbon steel and aluminum products | |
| 2014 | Northern Illinois Steel Supply | Undisclosed | Focus on energy and petrochemical sectors | |
| 2014 | Fox Metals And Alloys | Undisclosed | A steel distributor specializing in alloy, carbon and stainless steel bar and plate products | |
| 2016 | Tubular Steel | Undisclosed | 7 service centers | |
| 2016 | Best Manufacturing | Undisclosed | Custom sheet metal fabricator of steel and aluminum products | |
| 2016 | Alaska Steel Company | Undisclosed | Metals processor | |
| 2018 | KMS Fab, LLC and KMS South, Inc | Undisclosed | Precision sheet metal fabricator | |
| 2018 | All Metals | Undisclosed | Toll Processing and Logistics | |
| 2021 | United Pipe & Steel | Undisclosed | Master distributor of standard pipe products | |
