= Bunker Hill, Los Angeles =

Neighborhood in Los Angeles, California, US

Bunker Hill
- Neighborhood
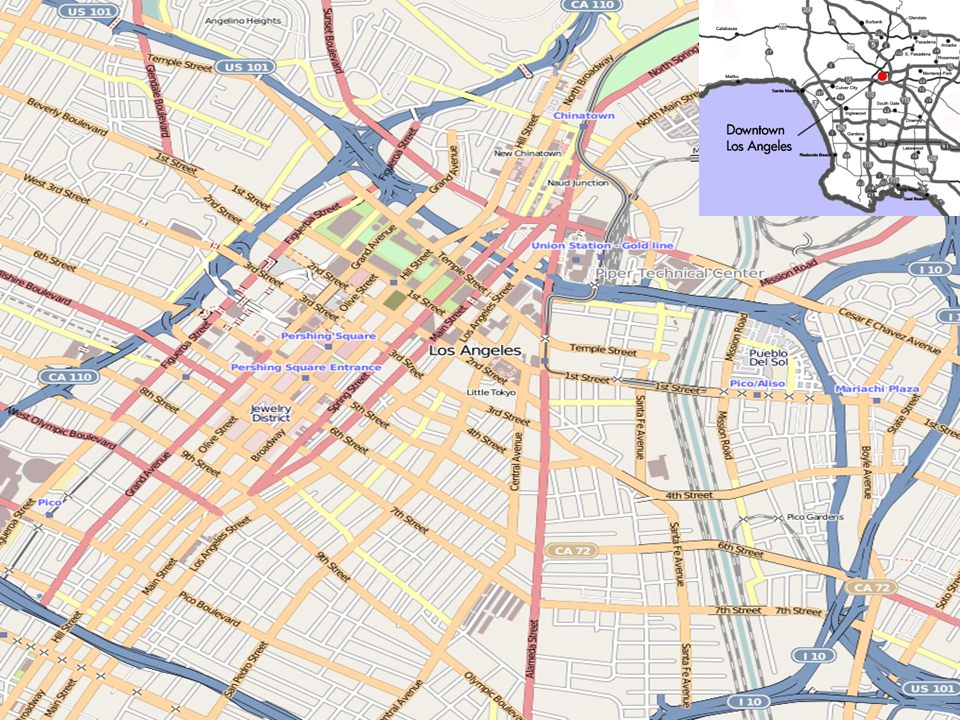
- Location within Downtown Los Angeles
- Coordinates: 34.052035°N 118.250347°W
- Country: United States
- State: California
- County: Los Angeles
- City: Los Angeles
- Named for: Battle of Bunker Hill
- Area code: 213

Bunker Hill is a neighborhood in Los Angeles, California. It is part of Downtown Los Angeles.

Historically, Bunker Hill was a large hill that separated the Victorian-era Downtown from the western end of the city. The hill was tunneled through at Second Street in 1924, and at Third and Fourth Streets. In the late 20th century, the hill was lowered in elevation, and the entire area was redeveloped to supplant old frame and concrete buildings with modern high-rises and other structures for residences, commerce, entertainment, and education.

== History ==
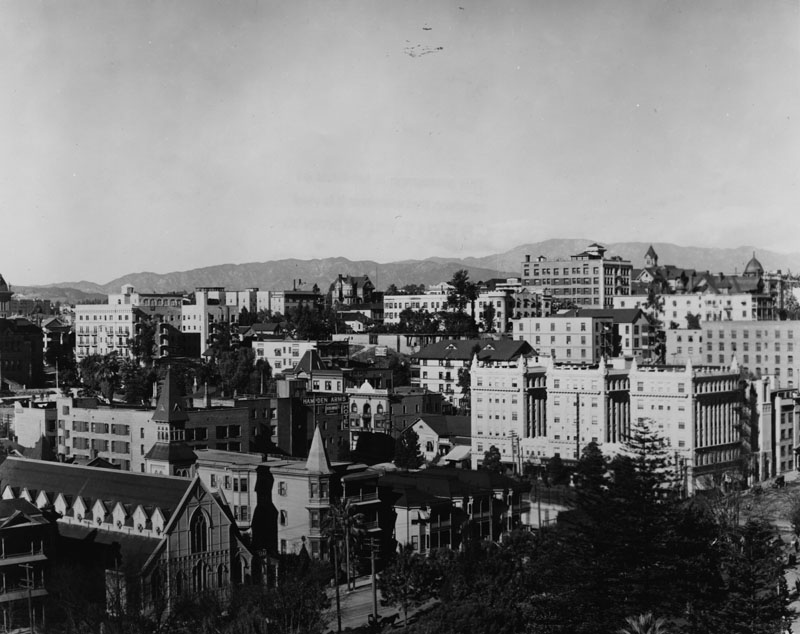
A view of Bunker Hill, 1900, with Pershing Square in the foreground

=== Early development ===
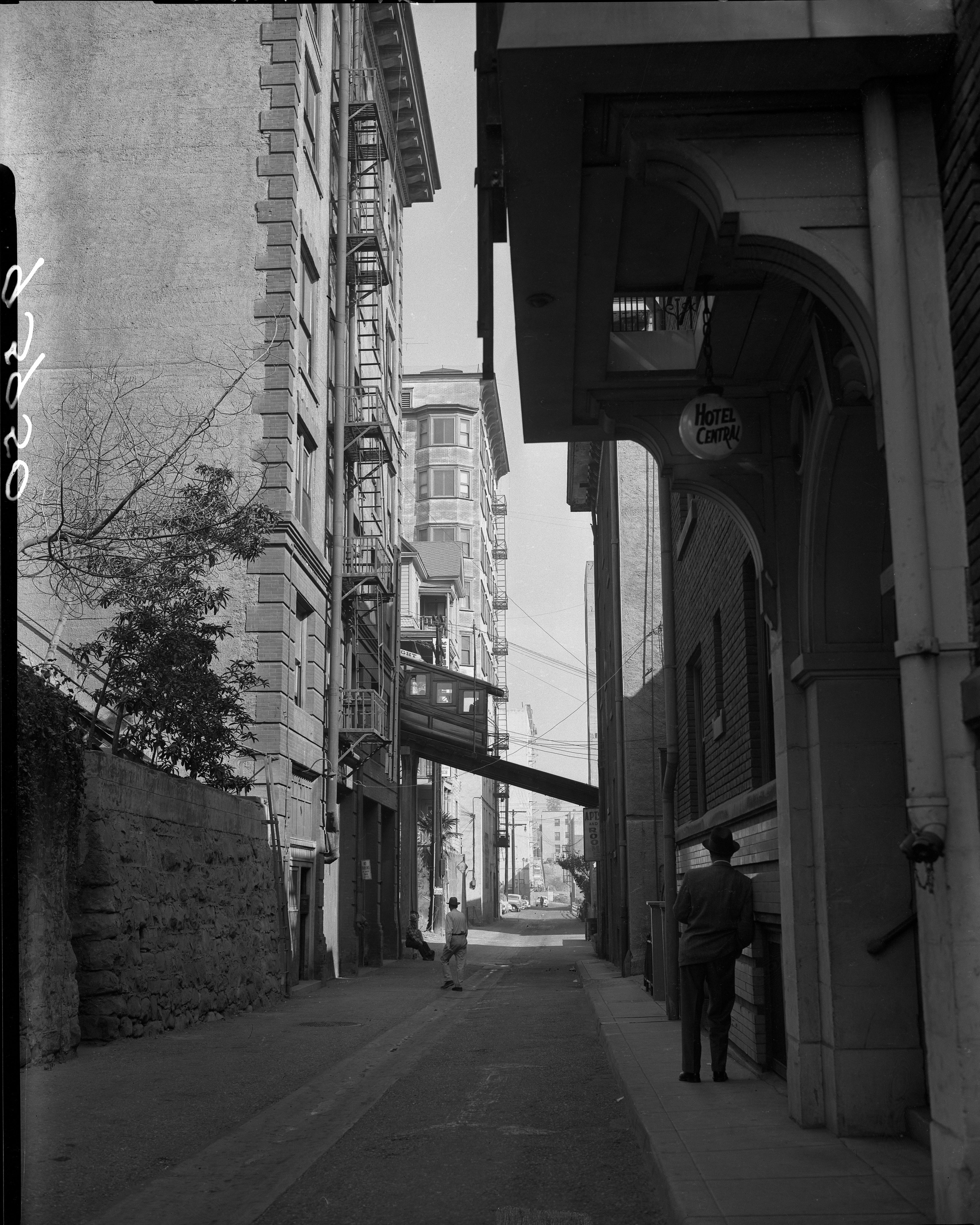
View of Angels Flight as it passes over Clay Street in 1955

In 1867, two wealthy developers, Prudent Beaudry, a French-Canadian immigrant, and Stephen Mott purchased a majority of the hill's land. Beaudry's land purchase ranged from present-day Hill Street to Olive Street and 4th Street and 2nd Street. Mott's land purchase ranged between 4th Street to Temple and Figueroa and Grand. Because of the hill's excellent views of the Los Angeles Basin and the Los Angeles River, he knew that it would make for an opulent subdivision. Beaudry employed surveyor George Hansen to help divide up the land into 80 plots to sell to individual buyers.

Beaudry started to build his house on the top of the hill, a modest two-story structure. He needed the infrastructure set up to reach the top of the hill, such as the water pipes. He asked the Los Angeles Water Company to help build the water pipe up the hill. Due to the nature of the hill and their initial concerns about the plan they denied his plea. As result, he built his own pipes and also formed the Canal and Reservoir Company Several new streets were created, one of which—Bunker Hill Avenue, named in commemoration of the Battle of Bunker Hill—eventually gave its name to the new neighborhood.

Beaudry developed the peak of Bunker Hill with lavish two-story Victorian houses that became famous as homes for the upper-class residents of Los Angeles. The dominant architecture of the community of the houses of Bunker Hill was Queen Anne and Eastlake style. The geography of the Hill allowed these residents to escape the hustle and bustle of the city as it slowly grew around at the flatland at the bottom of the hill. Some notable residents during these times are:

- Prudent Beaudry – 13th Mayor of Los Angeles, developer of Bunker Hill
- L. J. Rose: Arrived from Iowa, due to the death of his son to serious bronchial trouble during a harsh winter. Wine maker and entrepreneur
- Dr. Edmund Hildreth: Retired Clergyman from Chicago
- D. F. Donigan: Self-made man. Owned his own contracting business, which later was the contractor for the construction of the first railroad which led from Los Angeles to Pasadena. He became an indispensable adviser to Beaudry when it came to beginning the development of Bunker Hill in its early stages.
- Lewis L. Bradbury Sr. and his wife – Made their fortune from silver mines in Mexico. Original owner of the Bradbury Building in Downtown LA.
- Judge Robert M. Widney – Founder of University of Southern California. Helped create the first transportation for the residents up the Hill, a horse-drawn carriage.

After the introduction of the horse carriage to the Bunker Hill neighborhood, the iconic Angel's Flight was proposed. Angel's Flight, now dubbed "The World's Shortest Railway", took residents homeward from the bottom of the 33% grade and down again. Colonel J. W. Eddy petitioned the Los Angeles City Council to establish an electric cable railway, which was approved ten days later signed by the mayor, Meredith P. Snyder. The first railway which was established and operational was on Third Street, from Hill Street to Olive Street.

==== "Blighted Community" ====
Initially a residential suburb, Bunker Hill retained its exclusive character through the end of World War I. Around the 1920s and the 1930s, with the advent of the Pacific Electric Railway and the construction of the freeway, and the increased urban growth fed by an extensive streetcar system, its wealthy residents began leaving for enclaves such as Beverly Hills and Pasadena. Bunker Hill's houses were increasingly subdivided to accommodate renters. Bunker Hill was at this time "Los Angeles's most crowded and urban neighborhood". By World War II, the Pasadena Freeway, built to bring shoppers downtown, was taking more residents out. Additional postwar freeway construction left downtown comparatively empty of both people and services. The once-grand Victorian mansions of Bunker Hill became the home of impoverished pensioners. Over time, apartment buildings started being built alongside these houses. As more and more people crowded into these cheap housing units, the population of the hill increased 19%, most of whom were low income.

=== Bunker Hill Redevelopment Project ===
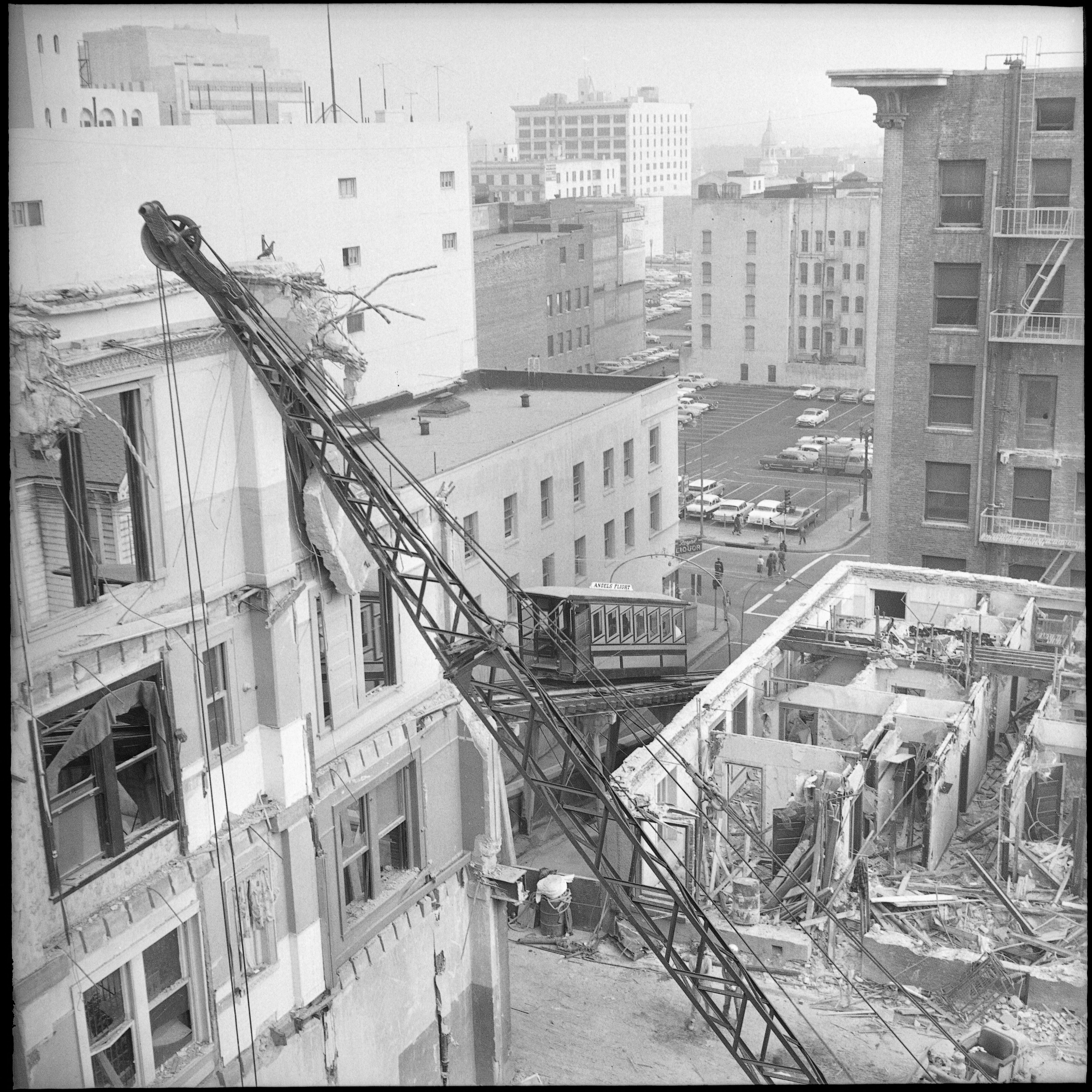
The demolition of the buildings around Angels Flight, 1962

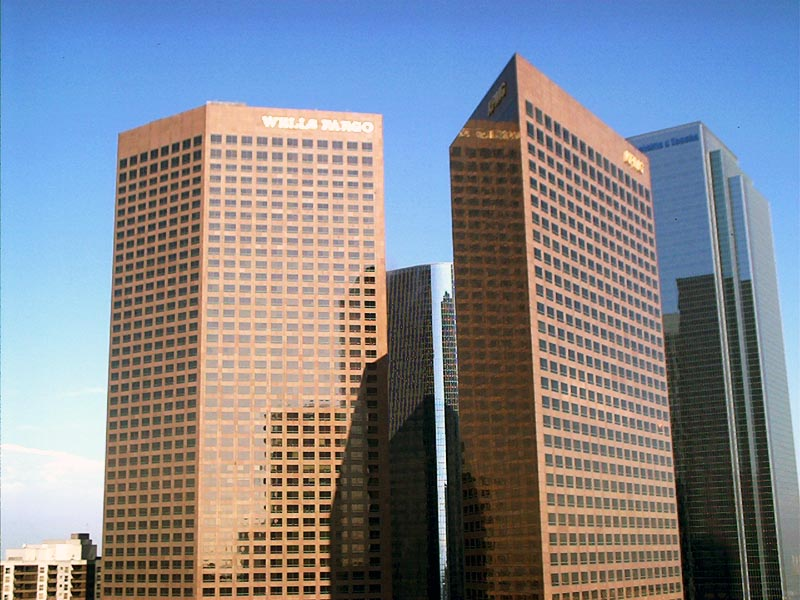
The Wells Fargo Center, One California Plaza and Two California Plaza, stands on the highest point of Bunker Hill. As seen from the top of the Westin Bonaventure Hotel.

In 1955, Los Angeles city planners decided that Bunker Hill required a massive slum clearance project. There were a couple of major political events which led to the "removal of the blight" and redevelopment of Bunker Hill: the California Community Redevelopment Law of 1945, the Federal Housing Act of 1946 and 1949, the creation of the Community Redevelopment Agency in 1948, and also the Bunker Hill Urban Renewal Project in 1959.

The California Community Redevelopment law of 1945 allowed counties and cities to create and implement these agencies to help deal with the redevelopment of local cities. Until 2011, these Agencies held much power and were still around, until Governor Jerry Brown signed into law two bills to dissolve them.

Along with those political factors, other things which led to the conclusion of the blighted neighborhood came from some of the government offices. The Los Angeles Police Department called the area a "high frequency crime area", due to the fact that the area's apartments catered to known offenders. The health department of Los Angeles also called the area a health hazard for its city. In 1959–1961, the CRA won a series of court cases brought against it in regard to the redevelopment plan, which were appealed, culminating ultimately in a California Supreme Court decision in favor of the CRA in 1964, allowing redevelopment to progress. This loss for the residents of Bunker Hill led to the displacement of many families and removal of many of the low income residents of the area. This victory for the CRA led to them being able to buy land to redevelop as they saw fit. Within the plans for the redevelopment, there was a section for the rehabilitation of the buildings of Bunker Hill. The section was slated to preserve the historical buildings of Bunker Hill, which were instead demolished since there was no actual rehabilitation planned.

The development of Bunker Hill caused much controversy. The creation of the Public Works Administration and the 1949 U.S. Federal Housing Act helped quickly to clear and acquire the land on which "slum and blighted" areas of Downtown's Bunker Hill were situated. The city cleared the land and sold this land to private and public development according to the plan made by the CRA.

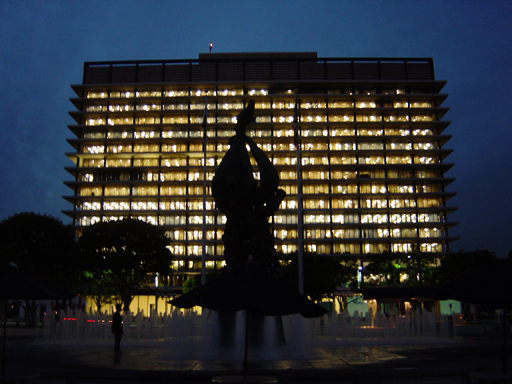
John Ferraro Building, Bunker Hill, home to the Los Angeles Department of Water & Power

The project is the longest redevelopment project in Los Angeles history. The majority of the skyscrapers on Bunker Hill were built in the 1980s, with a new skyscraper or two being finished nearly every year. However, the momentum died down in the 1990s, shortly after the 52-story Two California Plaza was finished. In 1999, the vacancy rate for downtown commercial skyscrapers was 26%, one of the highest in the nation for that time. Planned office towers were canceled, including California Plaza Three.

=== 21st century adaptive re-use ===
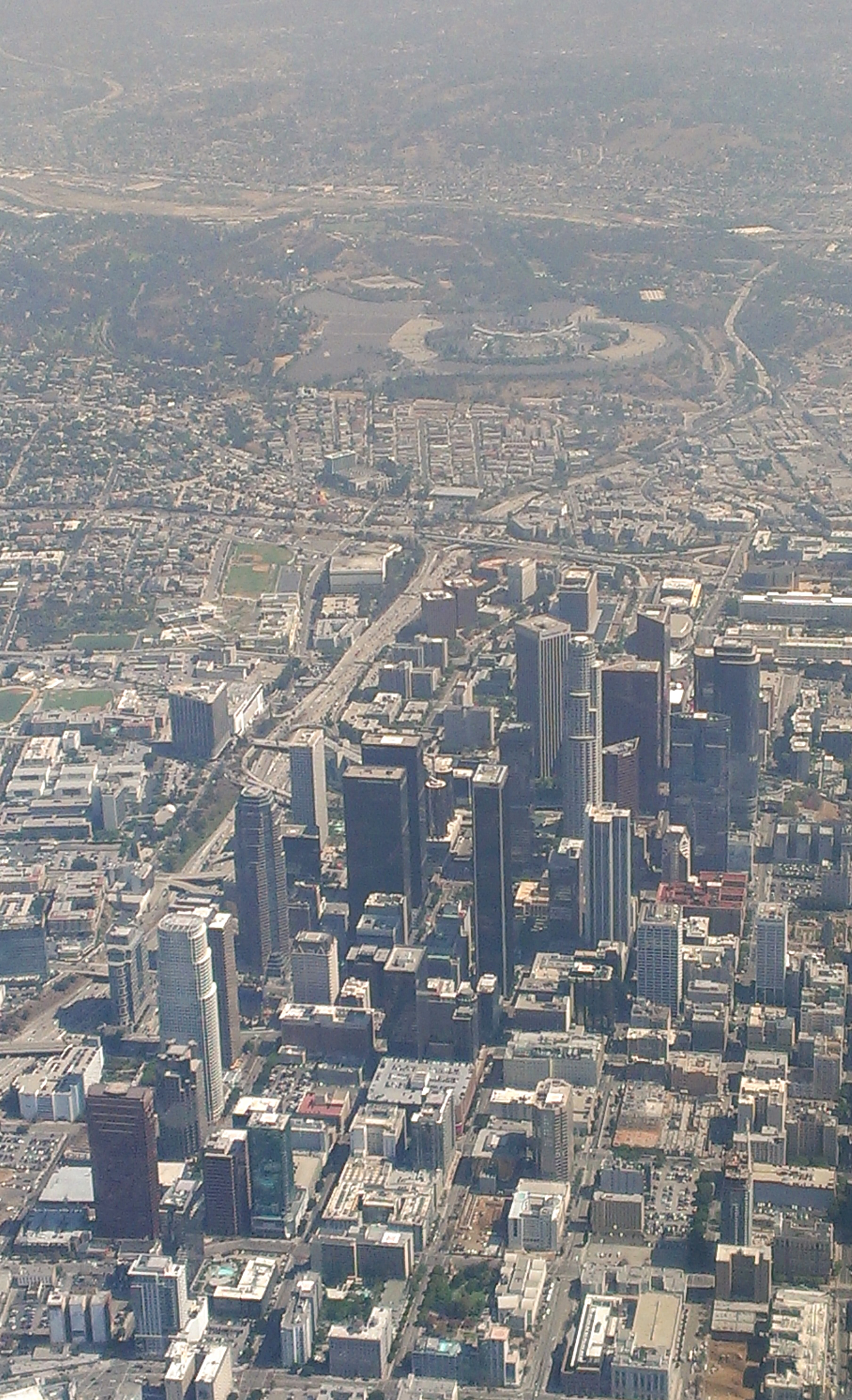
Aerial view in 2014

A sign of the success of the downtown renaissance was the lower office vacancy rate for the fourth quarter of 2004 at 16%, compared to 19% for 2003, and 26% for 1999.

==== Affordable housing ====
While developers are primarily building market-rate housing on Bunker Hill today, Los Angeles has very strict laws, rules, and ordinances established that promote the inclusion of all income levels into the residential mix. Some examples include incentives for the creation of affordable housing (rather than market-rate housing), the preservation of existing affordable housing, the development of affordable housing by the city itself (rather than waiting for private developers), and others. The city has written documentation regarding the development of affordable housing.

On the topic of building affordable housing for very low-income to moderate-income, Principal City Planner Jane Blumenfeld said, "We are trying to make it attractive to build [downtown] and get this added affordable housing that we normally wouldn't have. We need an adequate amount of lower income housing so that in 20 years Downtown doesn't become an exclusive neighborhood."

The Emerson apartment building, owned by the Related Companies, has 271 units, of which 216 are leased at market rates. The other 55 units are at subsidized rates to tenants whose annual incomes are less than 50% of the local median, which was $42,700 for a family of four in 2014.

== Notable features ==
=== Library Steps ===
The 60-foot wide (18 m) double stairway public art installation Library Steps was designed by Lawrence Halprin in 1989. It physically and symbolically connects the main entrance of the Los Angeles Public Library at Fifth Street with Hope Place and the Kechum-Downtown YMCA to the north. The double stairs flank a cascading river rock "stream" that flows from the pool surrounding Robert Graham's 1992 public art sculpture Source Figure, and terminate at Fifth Street with a fountain element and seating.

=== Angels Flight railway ===
The 1901 Angels Flight funicular railway, originally connecting Hill Street and Olive Street immediately south of the east end of the 3rd Street Tunnel, was dismantled in 1969. It was relocated approximately 300 feet (91 m) farther south and rebuilt in 1996 to connect Hill Street with California Plaza.

=== Public venues ===
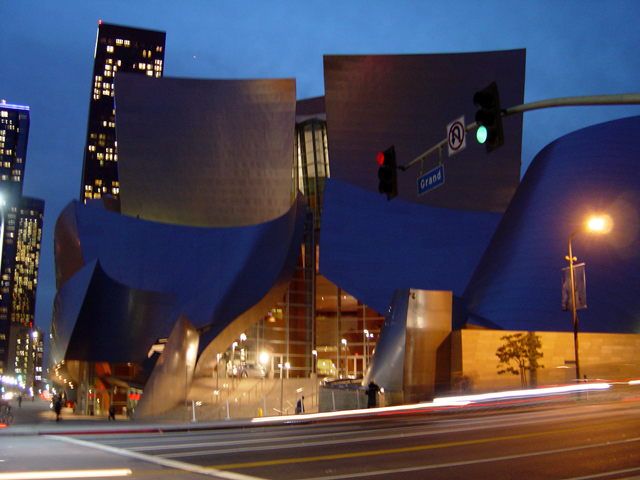
Walt Disney Concert Hall, Bunker Hill

Contributing to the resurgence of Bunker Hill has been the construction of public venues, such as Walt Disney Concert Hall and the Museum of Contemporary Art.

The Broad modern art museum opened next to Disney Concert Hall on September 20, 2015.

== In popular culture ==
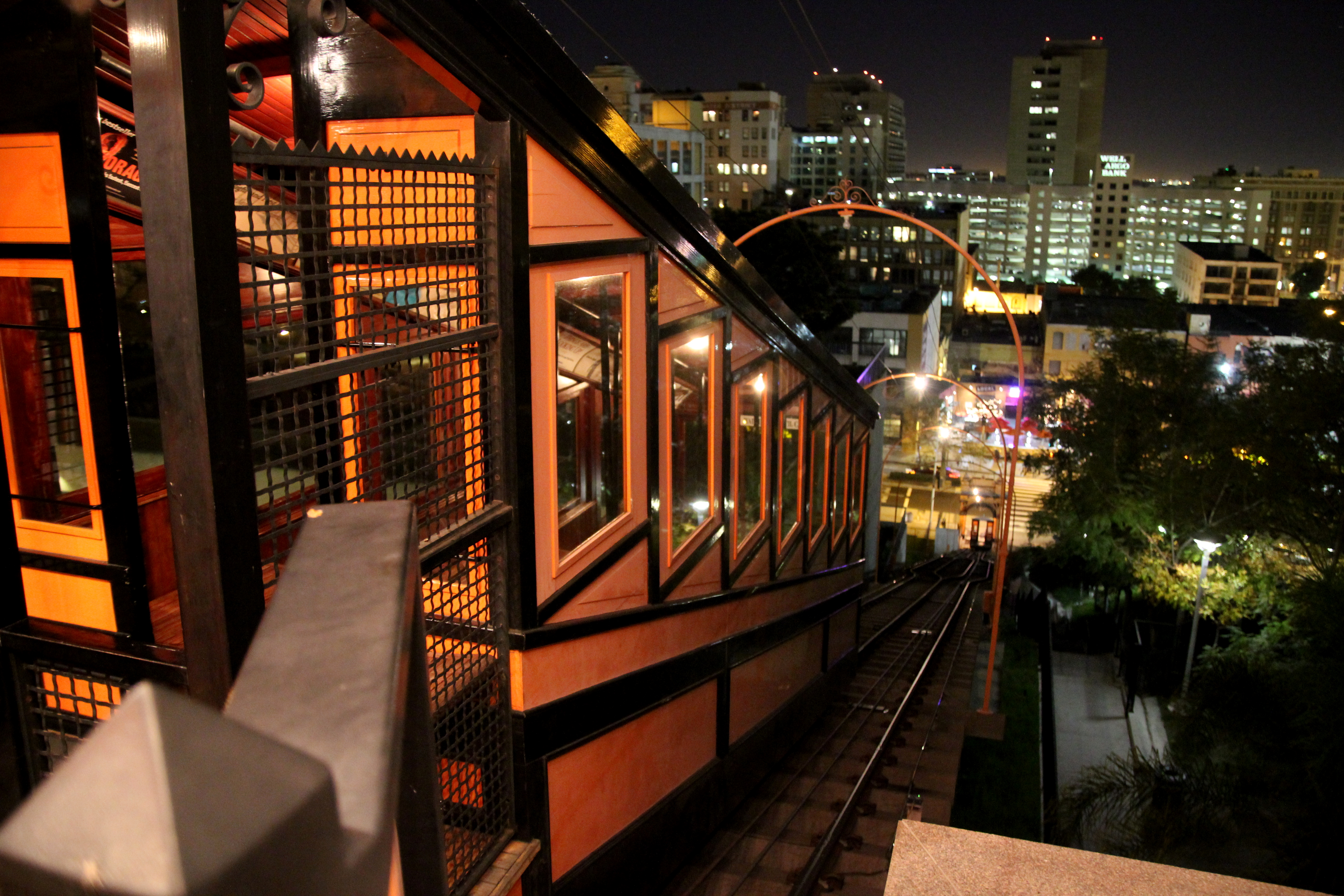
Angels Flight, December 2011

=== Video games ===
L.A. Noire, the 2011 Video Game set in 1947 Los Angeles, features a close recreation of the area in that period.

=== Film ===
In the 1940s and 1950s, Bunker Hill was a popular film setting, especially in the film noir genre, because of its Victorian homes, its rambling hillside apartments and flophouses, its Angels Flight funicular, and its mean (or at least mean-looking) streets. It was used extensively in such crime films as Cry Danger (1951), Kiss Me Deadly (1956), Criss Cross (1949), Joseph Losey's M (1951), and Angel's Flight (1965).

Director Curtis Hanson re-created Bunker Hill in another hilly neighborhood altogether in his Oscar Award–winning L.A. Confidential (1997). Kent Mackenzie made a film in 1956 called Bunker Hill about the displacement of the residents who had to make way for construction. Another film by Mackenzie that was set in the area —his neo-realist and semi-documentary feature The Exiles (1961) — depicts the lives of a tribe of urban Indians on Bunker Hill in the late 1950s.

=== Books ===
Bunker Hill is the setting for much of Robin Robertson's 2018 verse narrative The Long Take which won the 2018 Goldsmiths Prize. The book includes a map of the old Bunker Hill neighbourhood. Robertson discussed his fascination with the district on BBC Radio 4's The Film Programme in March 2019.

Dreams from Bunker Hill (1982) is the last novel written by John Fante before his death. On April 8, 2010, the day of the 101st anniversary of the writer's birth, John Fante Square was inaugurated at the intersection of Fifth Street and Grand Avenue.

== Services ==
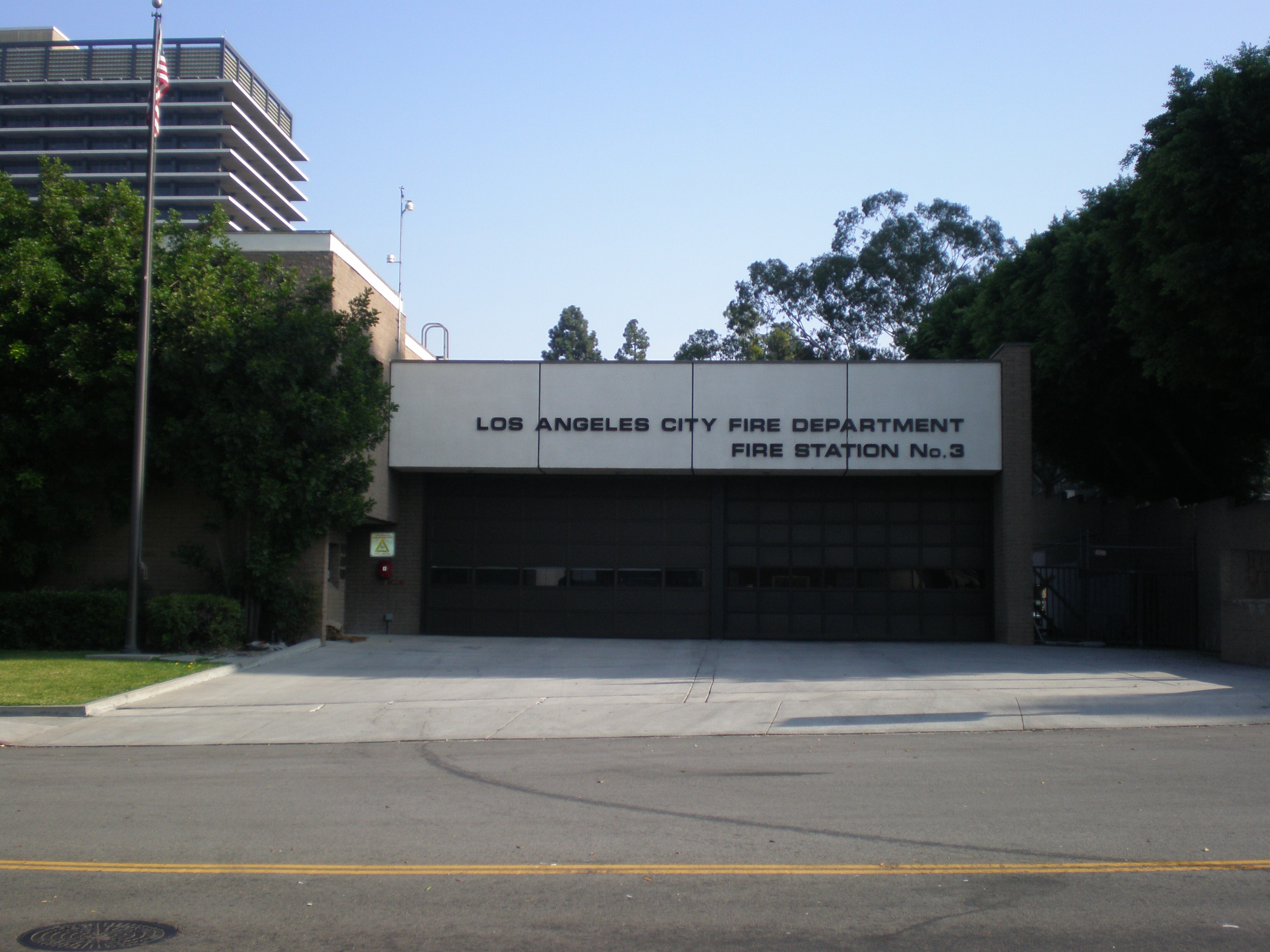
Fire Station 3 Downtown

=== Emergency services ===
The Los Angeles Police Department's Central Community Police Station serves Downtown Los Angeles, including Bunker Hill.

The Los Angeles Fire Department's Central Bureau serves Downtown Los Angeles, including Bunker Hill. The LAFD operates Fire Station 3 (Civic Center/Bunker Hill) in the area.

=== Education ===
The area is served by the Los Angeles Unified School District.

== Notable people ==
- Lynn "Buck" Compton, WW II Veteran, commissioned officer E Company, 2nd Battalion, 506th Parachute Infantry Regiment,101st Airborne Division, United States Army, (Easy Company, "Band of Brothers"). Lead prosecutor in Sirhan Sirhan's trial for the assassination of Robert F. Kennedy, former Judge California Court of Appeal.
- Richard Crenna, actor
- John Fante, American novelist
- Leo Politi, Italian American artist and author
- Jack Webb, actor, producer, creator of Dragnet and Adam-12
- Otto J. Zahn, Los Angeles City Council member in the 1920s and pigeon racer

== See also ==
- Central Business District, Los Angeles (1880-1899)
- Fort Moore Hill
