= L.A. Live =

Entertainment complex located in downtown Los Angeles, California, US

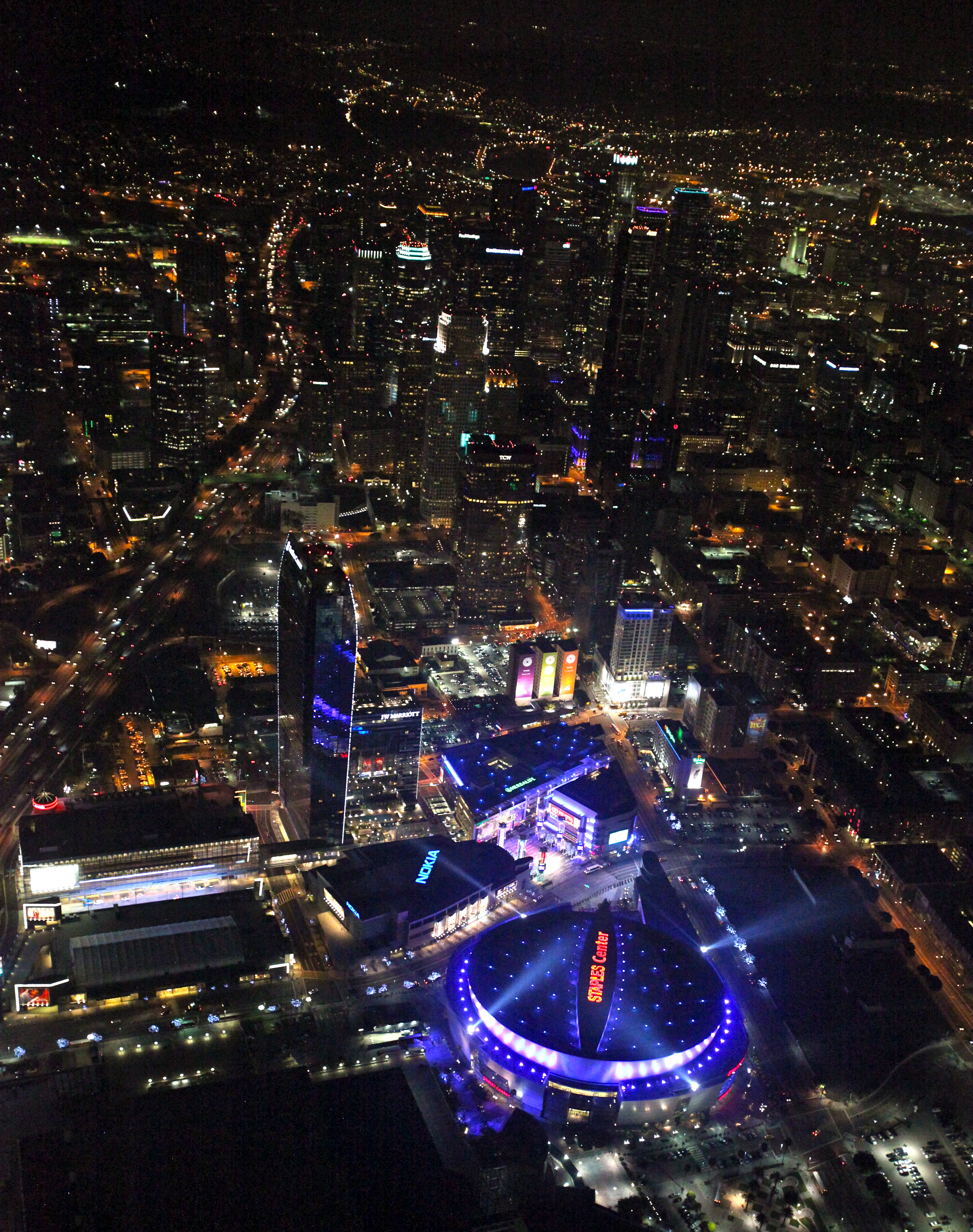
- Aerial view of L.A. Live and Staples Center at night
- Interactive map of L.A. Live
- Location: South Park District of Downtown Los Angeles, California, United States
- Address: 800 W. Olympic Blvd., Los Angeles, California 90015
- Coordinates: 34°02′40″N 118°16′00″W
- Status: in operation
- Groundbreaking: September 2005; 21 years ago
- Opening: Late 2007 – Early 2008
- Website: www.lalive.com

Companies
- Architect: RTKL Associates
- Structural engineer: John A. Martin & Associates
- Developer: Anschutz Entertainment Group; Wachovia Corp; Azteca Corp; MacFarlane Partners
- Owner: AEG Worldwide

Technical details
- Cost: approximately US$2.5 billion
- Size: 5,600,000 square feet (520,257 m^{2})

L.A. Live is an entertainment complex in the South Park District of downtown Los Angeles, California. It is adjacent to the Crypto.com Arena and the Los Angeles Convention Center.

L.A. Live was developed by Anschutz Entertainment Group (AEG) (which Anschutz is based in and L.A. Live is the flagship of), Wachovia Corp, Azteca Corp, investment firm MacFarlane Partners, and with tax deferments paid by Los Angeles taxpayers. It cost approximately US$2.5 billion to build. The architectural firm responsible for the master plan and phase two buildings was Baltimore-based RTKL Associates.

With the adjoining Los Angeles Convention Center and Crypto.com Arena, LA Live will be part of the "Downtown Sports Park" cluster for the upcoming 2028 Summer Olympics being held in Los Angeles.

== Timeline ==
Initial construction at L.A. Live began in September 2005. The first phase opened in October 2007 and contained Microsoft Theatre, the Xbox Plaza, a retail plaza, as well as an underground parking garage, holding a fraction of the project's expected total of 4,000 parking spaces.

L.A. Live was initially decried by architects as not being openly pleasing to the neighborhood streets and a metal looking fortress when it opened. The designer of the project, the architect Nate Cherry of CallisonRTKL, wanted to create narrow walkways to lure visitors into the plaza from the street, thus creating alleyways lined with restaurants, similar to a European style public plaza.

L.A. Live brought in a renaissance to the neighborhood surrounding Crypto.com Arena and billions in economic activity to downtown Los Angeles. Through the years, the success of LA LIVE! has created mirrored versions or renovations of districts adjacent to sports venues, including TEXAS LIVE in Arlington, Texas, KEMBA Live! at the Arena District in Columbus, Ohio, Kansas City Live! in Kansas City, Missouri, Maple Leaf Square in Toronto, Titletown District in Green Bay, Wisconsin, Patriot Place outside of Gillette Stadium in Massachusetts, Hollywood Park in Inglewood, California and the American Dream Meadowlands near Meadowlands Stadium in New Jersey.

Phase	Phase description	Scheduled opening	Status
Phase I	7,100-seat Peacock Theater and Peacock Place	October 2007	Completed
Phase II	ESPN studios and ESPN Zone restaurant/arcade complex, restaurants, Grammy Museum, Club Nokia, Lucky Strike bowling alley, and The Conga Room	October 2008	Completed
Phase III	54-story Ritz-Carlton/JW Marriott hotel and the 14-screen West Coast flagship theatre multiplex operated by Regal Entertainment Group.	Late 2009	Completed

=== Explored expansion ===
In 2020, AEG proposed a $1.2-billion public-private partnership that would add as much as 700,000 square feet to the convention center, which AEG operates, and a $700-million, 861-room addition to the JW Marriott hotel. Plans were approved in 2022. Three years of construction is scheduled. The LA City Council approved the planned expansion of the convention center in September 2025.

For a time prior to the return of the Los Angeles Rams in 2016, Phase IIII plans were being developed for the NFL to return to Los Angeles with a new stadium on the campus, to be called Farmers Field. The Los Angeles City Council approved a non-binding memorandum of understanding (MOU) with AEG in a 12–0 vote on August 9, 2011. AEG abandoned the project in March 2015, after the three most likely NFL teams all proposed their own stadium plans in the event they were to relocate to Los Angeles.

== Features ==
L.A. Live has 5.6 million square feet (520,257 m^{2}) of ballrooms, bars, concert theatres, restaurants, movie theaters, and a 54-story hotel and condominium tower on a 27-acre (10.9 ha) site. The complex became home to AEG and the Herbalife headquarters in 2008.

=== Event Deck ===
The west outdoor parking garage, the top-level roof is used as event space, called "Event Deck". The 90,000 square foot roof has no obstruction pilers and can easily accommodate large-scale tents and platforms. It was used for the 63rd Annual Grammy Awards and the 73rd Primetime Emmy Awards during the COVID-19 pandemic as they could accommodate an indoor and outdoor setting for safety protocol. Also used for the world premiers of the Hunger Games franchise and other Hollywood afterparties. The event space can hold up to 5,000 guests.

=== Peacock Place ===
Peacock Place (formerly Nokia Plaza, Microsoft Square & Xbox Plaza) is a 40,000-square-foot (3,716 m^{2}) open-air plaza that serves as the central meeting place for L.A. Live. The Square provides a broadcast venue featuring giant LED screens as well as a red carpet site for special events. Xbox Plaza hosted the first WWE SummerSlam Axxess event on the weekend beginning August 22, 2009, leading up to the 2009 SummerSlam event on August 23 at Staples Center. On June 24, 2010, the Square was the location for the official red carpet premiere of The Twilight Saga: Eclipse among other world premieres. The 2022 Major League Baseball All-Star Game red carpet was held at the plaza.

=== Peacock Theater and The Novo ===
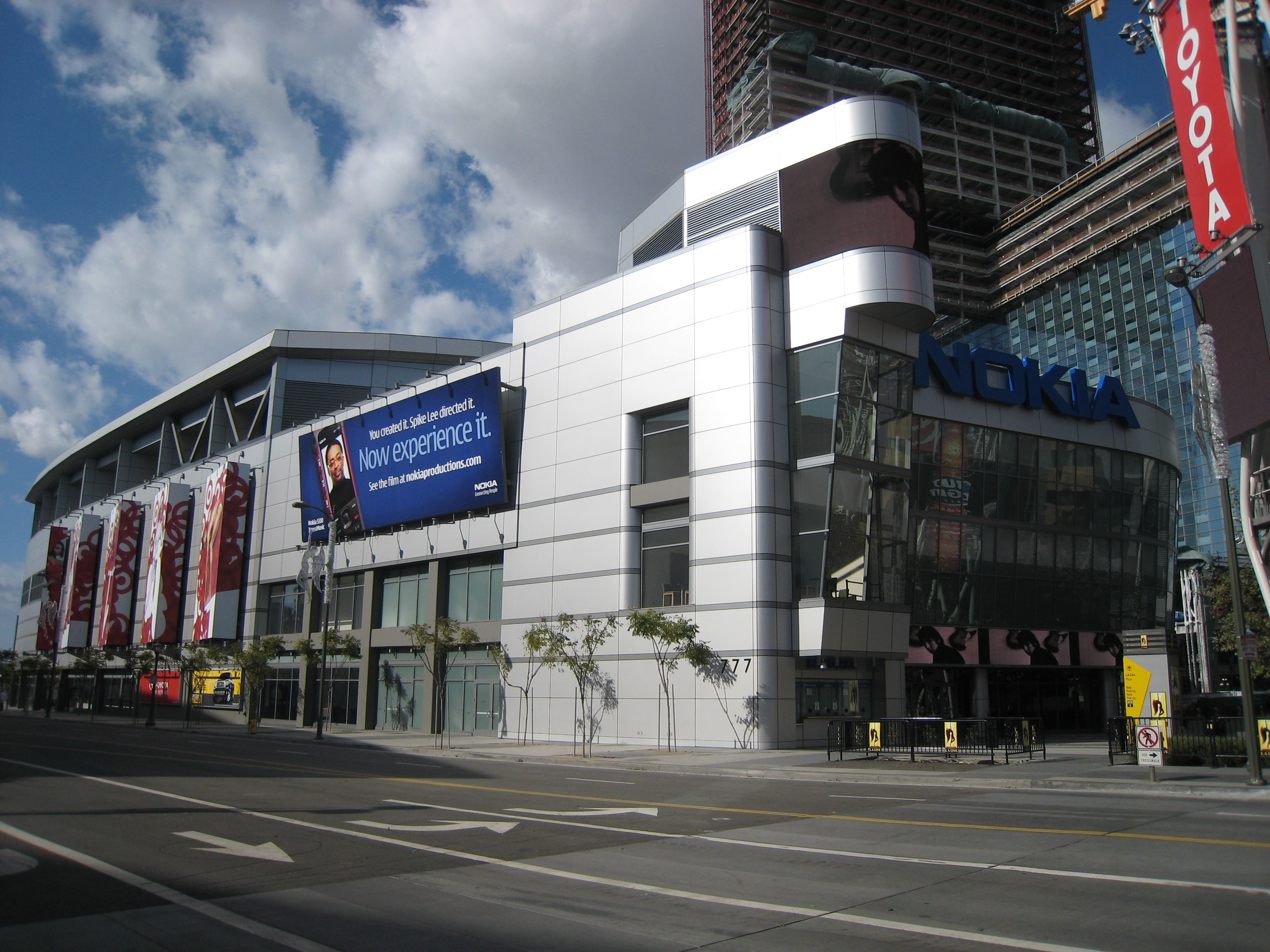
The completed Peacock Theater (formerly Nokia Theatre & Microsoft Theater) from Chick Hearn Court

Peacock Theater (previously the Nokia Theatre before June 2015 and Microsoft Theater before July 2023) is a music and theatre venue seating 7,100, and The Novo (previously Club Nokia) is a smaller venue with a seating capacity of 2,300 for live music and cultural events.

The theatre has hosted the ESPY Awards since 2008, as well as the American Music Awards, the Primetime Emmys, the Radio Disney Music Awards, the Billboard Music Awards, and other leading ceremonies serving the entertainment industry. The theater is so commonly used, on March 11, 2008, the Academy of Television Arts and Sciences announced with AEG that the venue would be the home to the Primetime Emmy Awards ceremony from 2008 onward.

The venue has also hosted the finale events of American Idol from 2008 to 2014. The 2010 MTV Video Music Awards were held at Microsoft Theater on September 12, 2010.

The first scheduled event held at the Peacock Theater was a concert featuring the Eagles and the Dixie Chicks on October 18, 2007. Recording artist John Mayer's live album Where the Light Is: John Mayer Live in Los Angeles was recorded at the Peacock Theater.

The Peacock Theater will host boxing prelims and weightlifting during the 2028 Summer Olympics, and goalball during the 2028 Summer Paralympics. It was also announced in 2026, The Academy of Motion Pictures will host the Oscars ceremony at Peacock theater starting in 2029, the 101st edition in a ten year deal with AEG.

=== Grammy Museum ===
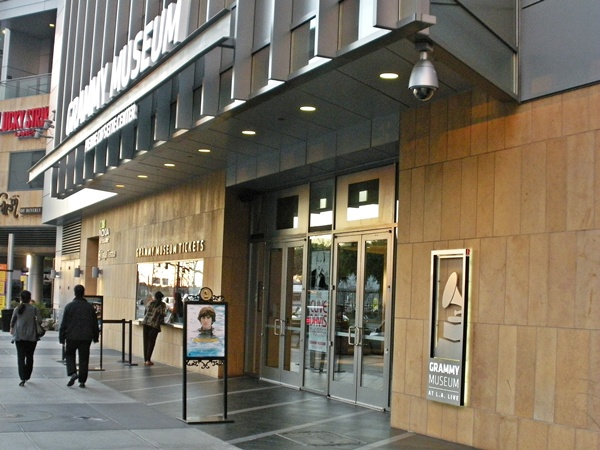
The entrance of the Grammy Museum at L.A. Live

On May 8, 2007, it was announced that the National Academy of Recording Arts and Sciences would establish a museum dedicated to the history of the Grammy Awards. The museum opened in December 2008 for the Grammy Awards 50th anniversary. It consists of four floors with historical music artifacts. It has featured a number of exhibits, including the John Lennon Songwriter Exhibit, which was open from October 4, 2010, to March 31, 2011. Embedded on the sidewalks at the LA Live streets are bronze disks, similar to the Hollywood Walk of Fame, honoring each year's top winners, Record of the Year, Best New Artist, Album of the Year, and Song of the Year.

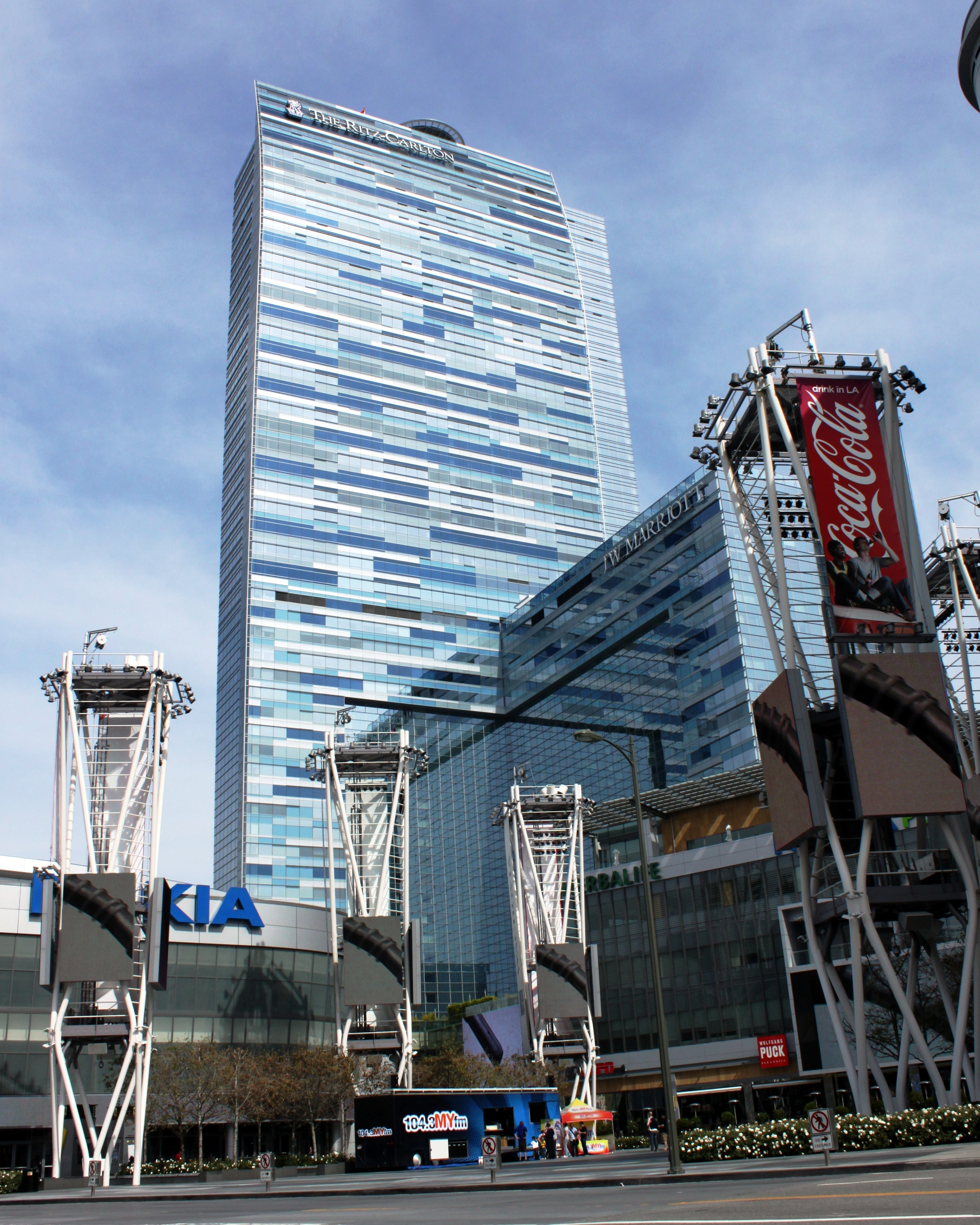
Marriott's Ritz Carlton and J.W. Marriott hotels

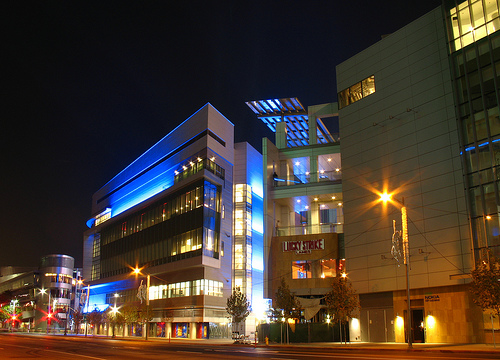
L.A. Live at night from Figueroa Street

=== Hotels and residences ===
The centerpiece of the district is a 54-story, 1,001-room two-hotel hybrid tower, constructed above the parking lot directly north of the Crypto.com Arena. Designed by Gensler and built by Webcor Builders, the skyscraper contains both an 879-room JW Marriott hotel on floors 3–21 and a 123-room Ritz-Carlton hotel on floors 22–26. Floors 27–52 hold 224 Residences at the Ritz Carlton condominiums. The tower's architectural design evolves from a "geometric pattern of glittering, blue-tinted glass." Thirty-four different types of glass were installed to create the uniquely patterned facade. Groundbreaking for the tower took place in June 2007. The project was completed in the first quarter of 2010.

In July 2014, Marriott Hotels opened a second two-hotel hybrid tower with 393 rooms just north across Olympic Boulevard with a Marriott Courtyard and a Residence Inn. In 2025, plans were filled by AEG for a 49-story tower with 364 residences and 334 hotel rooms. The building, which would also include restaurants and bars, would be built across Olympic Boulevard from L.A. Live on a corner lot on Georgia Street.

=== ESPN broadcasting studios ===
The second phase of development included a 12,300-square-foot (1,140 m^{2}) ESPN broadcasting studio, as well as an ESPN Zone restaurant built on the corner of Figueroa Street and Chick Hearn Court. In an effort to expand coverage of West Coast sports, ESPN began broadcasting the 1 AM ET (10 PM PT) edition of SportsCenter from the studio on April 6, 2009. The ESPN Zone restaurant closed in July 2013 and was replaced by Tom's Urban 24, Smashburger and Live Basil Pizza restaurants. It eventually closed in August 2026, with ESPN's operations moving to NFL Network's studios instead.

=== Regal Cinemas ===
The $100 million, 140,000 square foot (13,000 m^{2}), Regal Entertainment Group movie complex opened in 2009 and includes 14 screens and 3,772 seats. It includes a three-story art-deco-style atrium and an 806-seat theater called the "Regal Premiere House" intended for "lucrative" premieres. The theater complex became the West Coast flagship location for Regal, at the time of its opening, the largest theater chain in the United States. The Michael Jackson film This Is It was the opening film at the theater.

=== Restaurants ===
L.A. Live is also host to a set of mid- to upper-scale dining including Cleo, Fixins Soul Kitchen, Fleming's Prime Steakhouse & Wine Bar, Katsuya, Lawry's, Lazy Dog Restaurant & Bar, Rock'N Fish, Sol-Agave Mexican Restaurant, Savoca Italian, Smash Burger, Tom's Watch Bar, Wolfgang Puck Bar & Grill, and Yard House.

=== Vertiport ===
In August 2026, Archer Aviation announced that it would partner with AEG to develop a vertiport for their electric air taxis L.A. Live prior to the 2028 Summer Olympics, which would be the first vertiport in Downtown Los Angeles.

=== Construction gallery ===
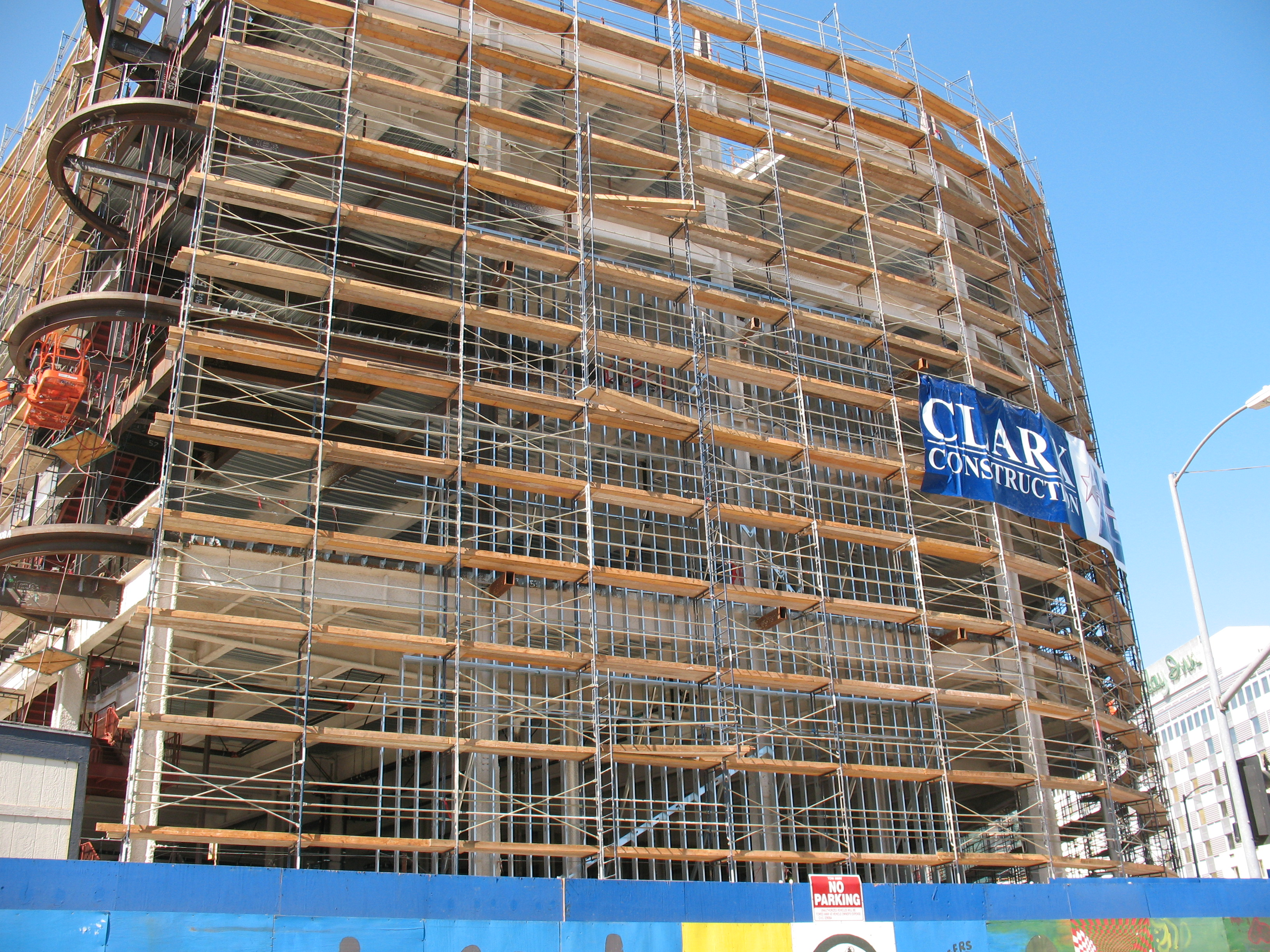
L.A. Live during Construction

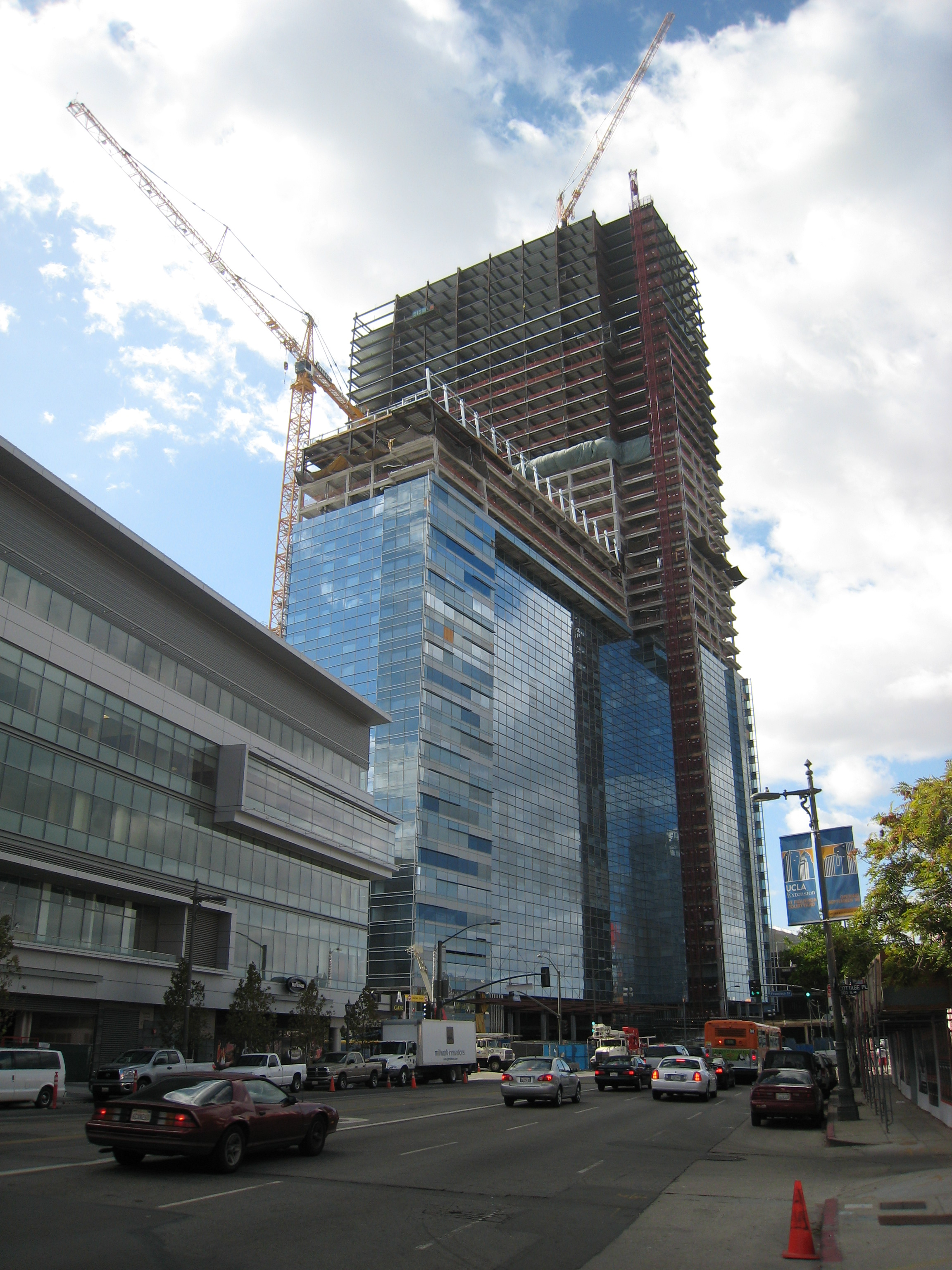
The hotel on Olympic Blvd. under construction in November 2008

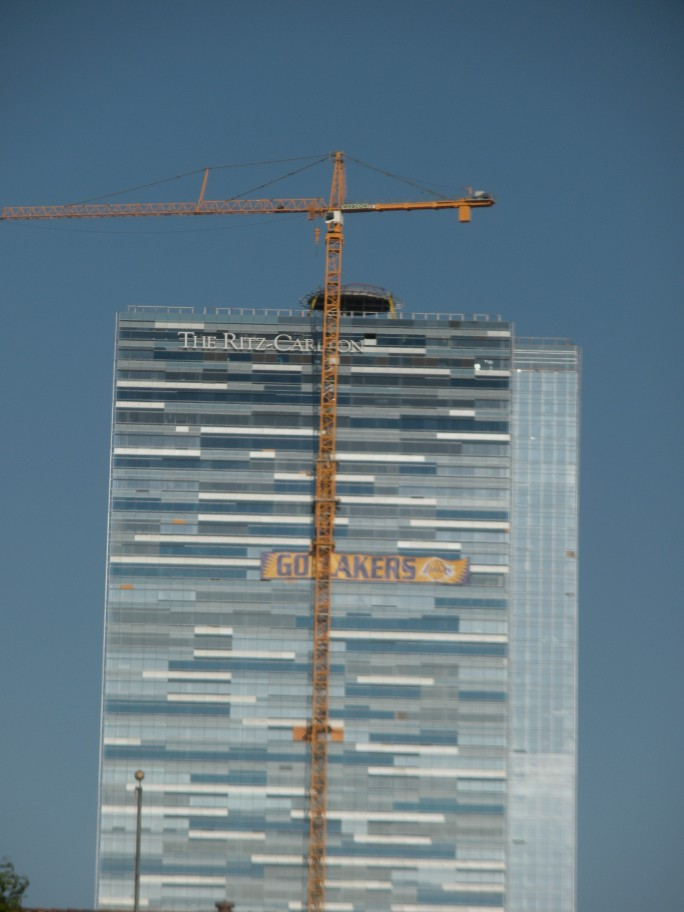
The completed Ritz Carlton Residences at LA Live

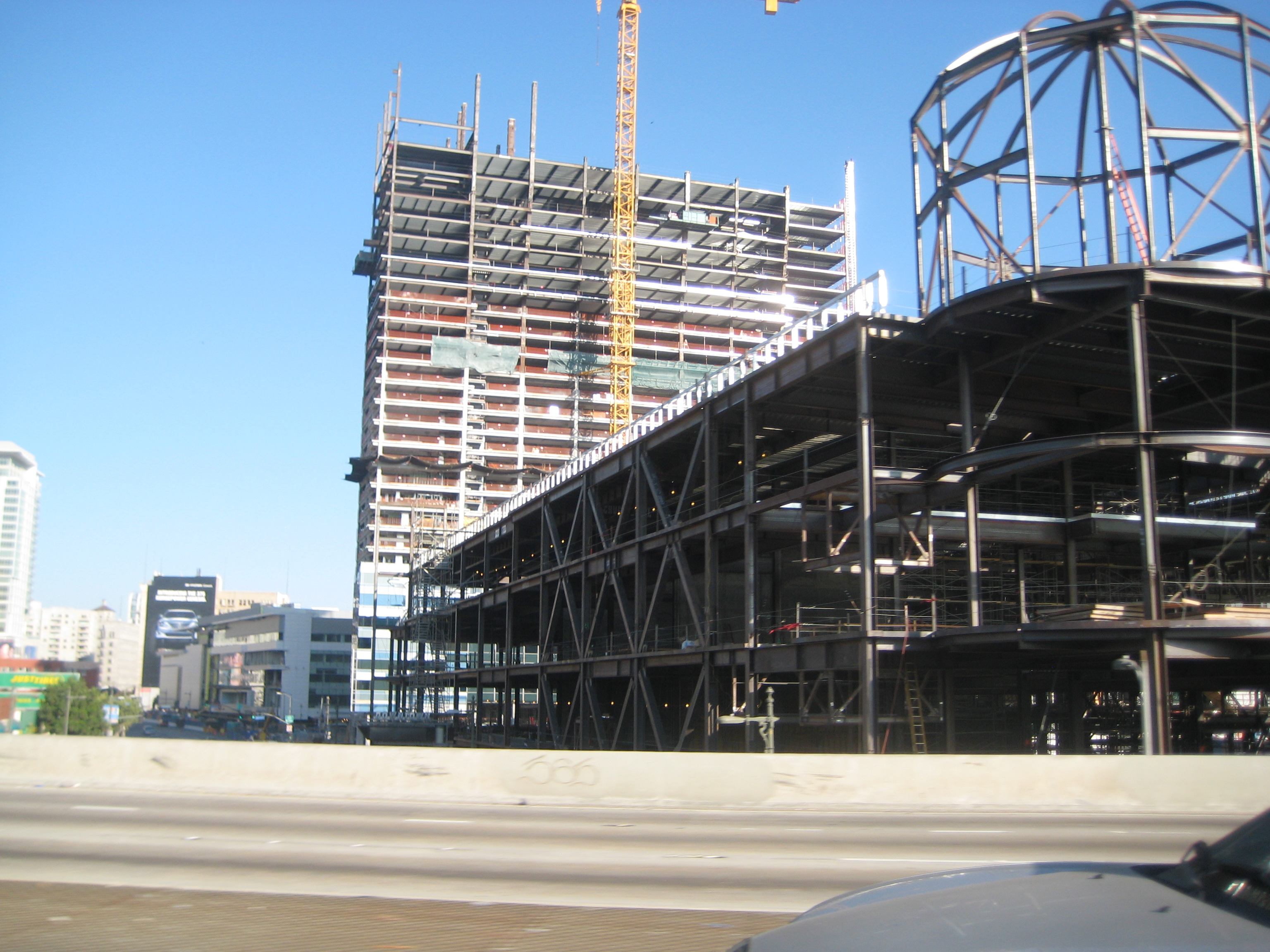
Regal Theater and Marriott under construction summer of 2008.

== See also ==
- Crypto.com Arena
- Oceanwide Plaza
- Circa Complex
- TCW Tower
- Wilshire Grand Center
- Hollywood Park
- Park Fifth Towers
- List of tallest buildings in Los Angeles
- Grand Avenue Project
- Ovation Hollywood
- Dolby Theatre
- List of music venues in Los Angeles
