= Hotel Figueroa =

Hotel in Los Angeles, California (opened 1926)

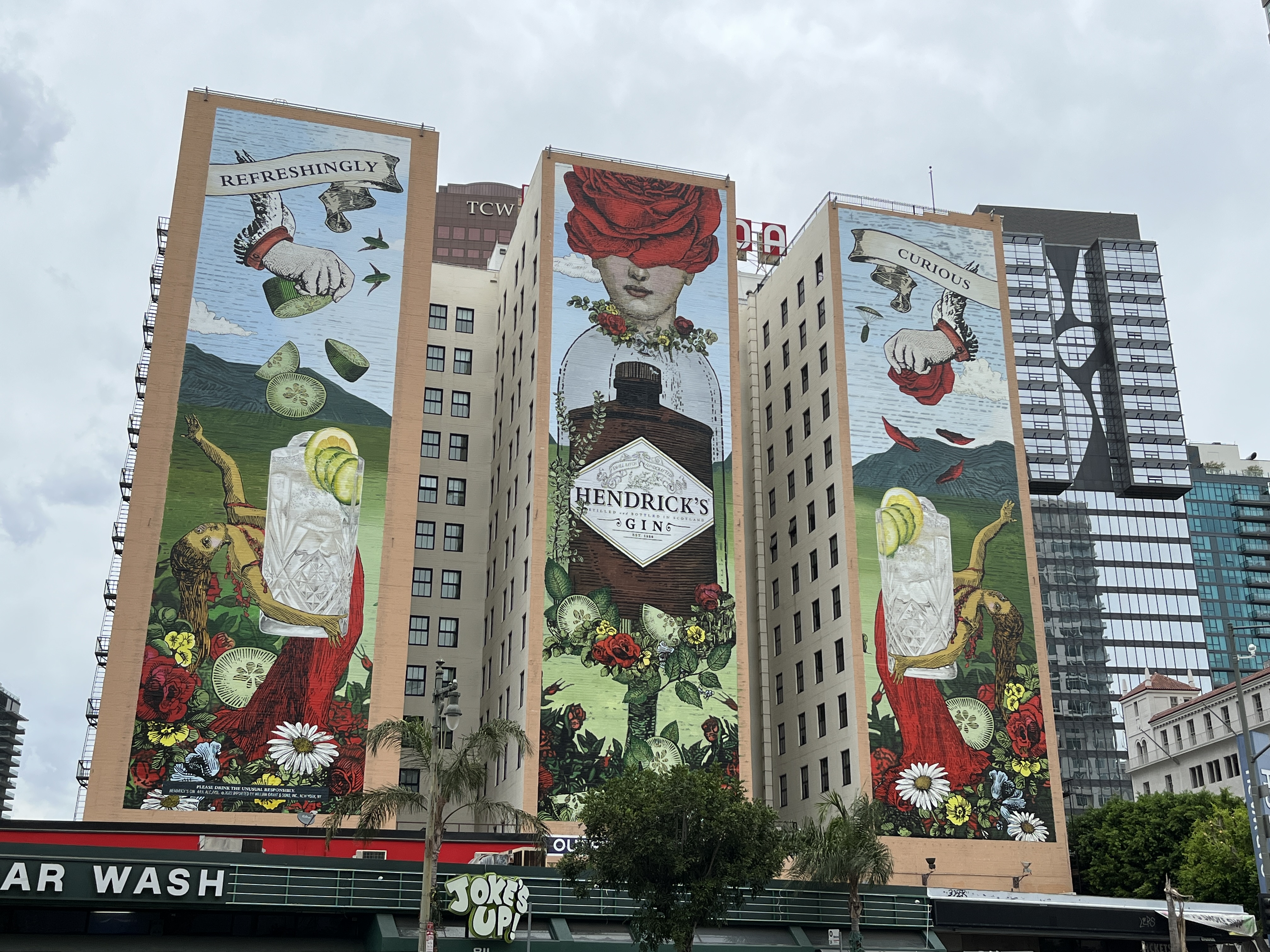
- Interactive map of the Hotel Figueroa area
- Hotel chain: The Unbound Collection by Hyatt

General information
- Architectural style: Spanish Colonial, Mediterranean Revival.
- Location: 939 S. Figueroa Street, Los Angeles, California, U.S.
- Coordinates: 34.04541°N 118.26378°W
- Construction started: 1925
- Opened: 1926
- Renovated: 1976 (conversion to Moroccan theme); 2014 (conversion to original architecture)
- Owner: Brad Hall

Technical details
- Floor count: 13

Design and construction
- Architecture firm: Stanton, Reed and Hibbard

Other information
- Number of rooms: 268 (261 hotel rooms, 7 suites)
- Public transit: Pico

Website
- www.hotelfigueroa.com

Hotel Figueroa (also the Figueroa Hotel, colloquially The Fig) is a hotel building in the South Park district of Downtown Los Angeles. Originally opened as a hostelry exclusive to women, the hotel underwent a transformation into a Moroccan-themed space in the 1970s before being restored to its initial Spanish Colonial architecture in 2014.

Founded in 1926 by the YWCA, the hotel was established to provide a haven for professional women, allowing them to lodge without the requirement of a male escort. It became a gathering place for business women and club women, initially catering exclusively to women with men having limited access to the building. Two years later, they expanded their clientele to include men to boost business. Following a period of decline in the 1950s and 1960s, Swedish entrepreneur Uno Thimansson purchased the hotel, converting it into a Moroccan-themed space that was known for its affordability compared to other hotels. The hotel remained this way until 2014 when a joint venture between GreenOak Real Estate and Urban Lifestyle Hotels acquired the property. They started a restoration process in order to return it to its original Spanish Colonial architecture, which was completed in 2018.

The hotel is 13 stories high and includes a coffin-shaped pool, the only remaining hotel pool on the ground floor, both due to limits from the city's architecture regulations at the time of its construction. The sides of the building have been used for hand-painted advertisements since the 1980s. Prior to its 2014 renovation, the hotel was decorated with decorated by Arabian-inspired items to match with its Moroccan theme, with the current decoration including paintings and other art by women.

== History ==
=== 1921–1951: Construction and early years ===
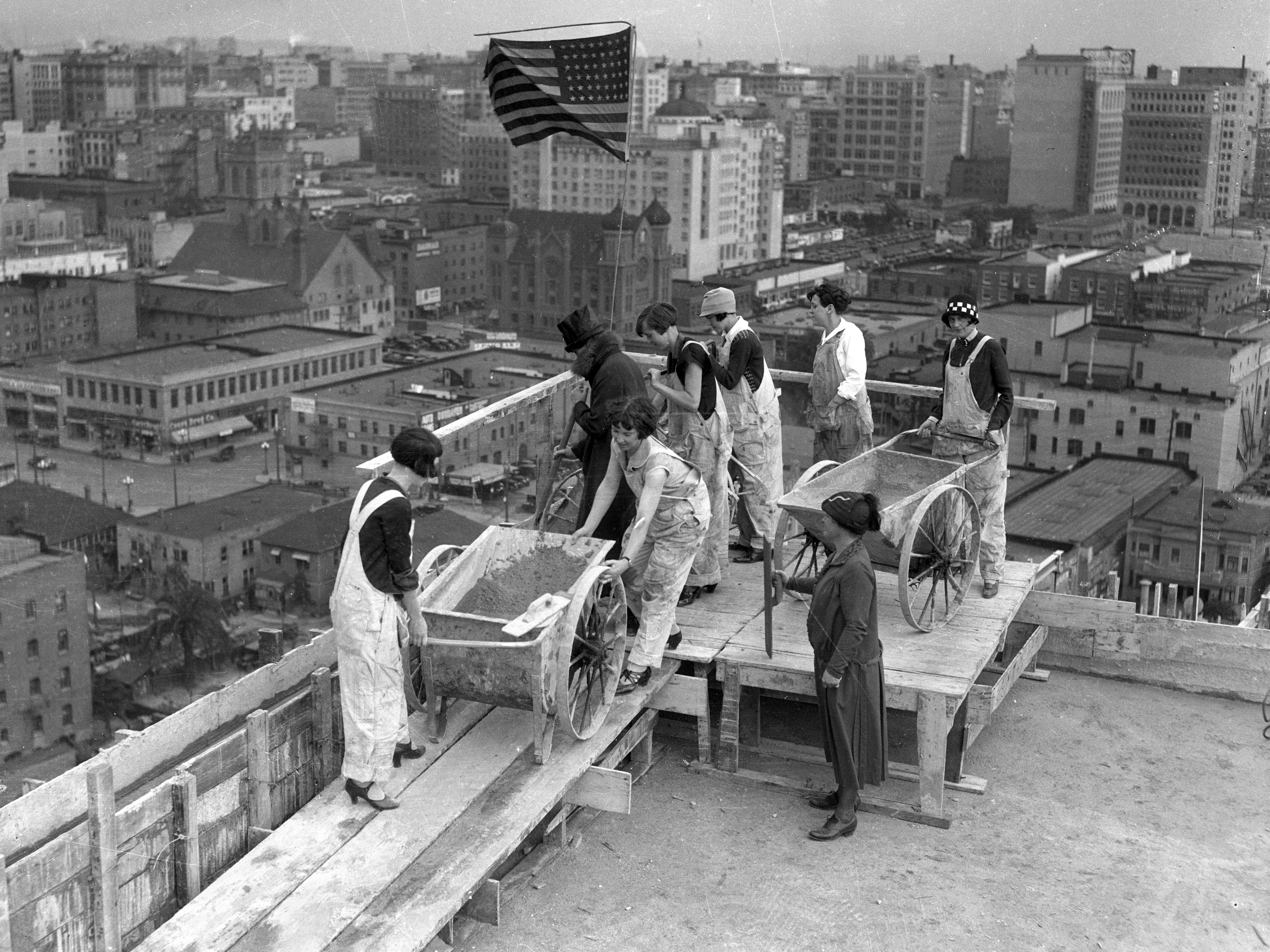
Female construction workers haul and pour concrete while on the roof of Hotel Figueroa, 1926.

In 1921, the Young Women's Christian Association secured a $1.25 million loan in order to build a hotel that could host professional women traveling alone, buying a plot of land in Downtown Los Angeles. At the time the hotel was established, women were prevented from booking a room in hotels unless they were accompanied by a man. The YWCA raised money from supporters in order to fund the hotel's construction, which started in 1925. The construction finished ahead of schedule with 13 stories and 409 rooms, and the hotel was dedicated on August 14, 1926.

Men were allowed within the hotel but were confined to the third and fourth floors. Married couples and their children had access to the first three floors, while the remaining floors of the hotel were exclusively reserved for women. The hotel hired Maude N. Bouldin as the first manager of the hotel, making her the first female manager in the United States.

In February 1928, the hotel switched to a traditional business model and opened the higher floors to men, with YWCA President Grace B. Ashley announcing a campaign to raise $300,000 in order to settle the mortgages the YWCA had for the hotel. In October 1929, following the Wall Street Crash, the YWCA was sold the hotel, although its headquarters remained there until 1951.

=== 1951–2014: Decline and conversion to Moroccan theme ===
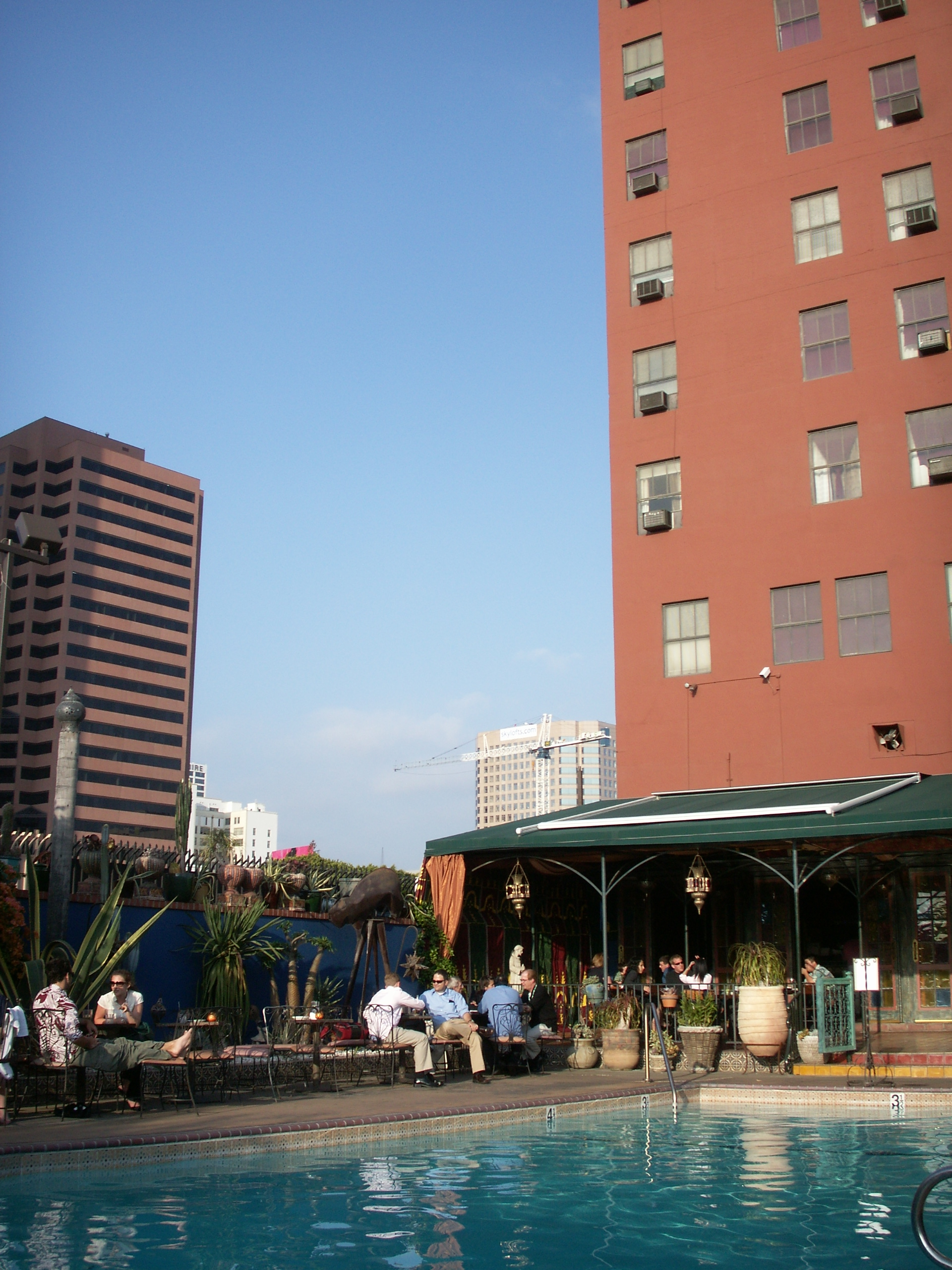
The hotel and pool in 2006.

As business declined in Downtown Los Angeles, the Hotel Figueroa experienced a decline as well. The new hotel owners downsized the room count from 400 to 285, ensuring that each room now had its own bathroom.

In 1976, the hotel was bought by Swedish entrepreneur Uno Thimansson, who converted the hotel into a space inspired by Moroccan architectural influences. During its Moroccan-themed phase, the hotel was known for its affordability compared to other hotels in the area. Thimansson introduced spaces such as the Tangier Room and the Club Fes, along with other areas in the hotel as part of the renovation. In a March 2014 interview, Thimansson stated that the hotel did not renovate, with the Los Angeles Times noting that the hotel had nearly as many negative reviews as positive ones on Tripadvisor, due to the absence of modern amenities.

=== 2014–present: Renovation and restoration ===
In July 2014, a joint venture by GreenOak Real Estate and Urban Lifestyle Hotels purchased the hotel for $65 million. Initially intending to keep the establishment as a 3-star hotel, new owner Brad Hall decided to restore the hotel to its original architecture after discovering the history of the property.

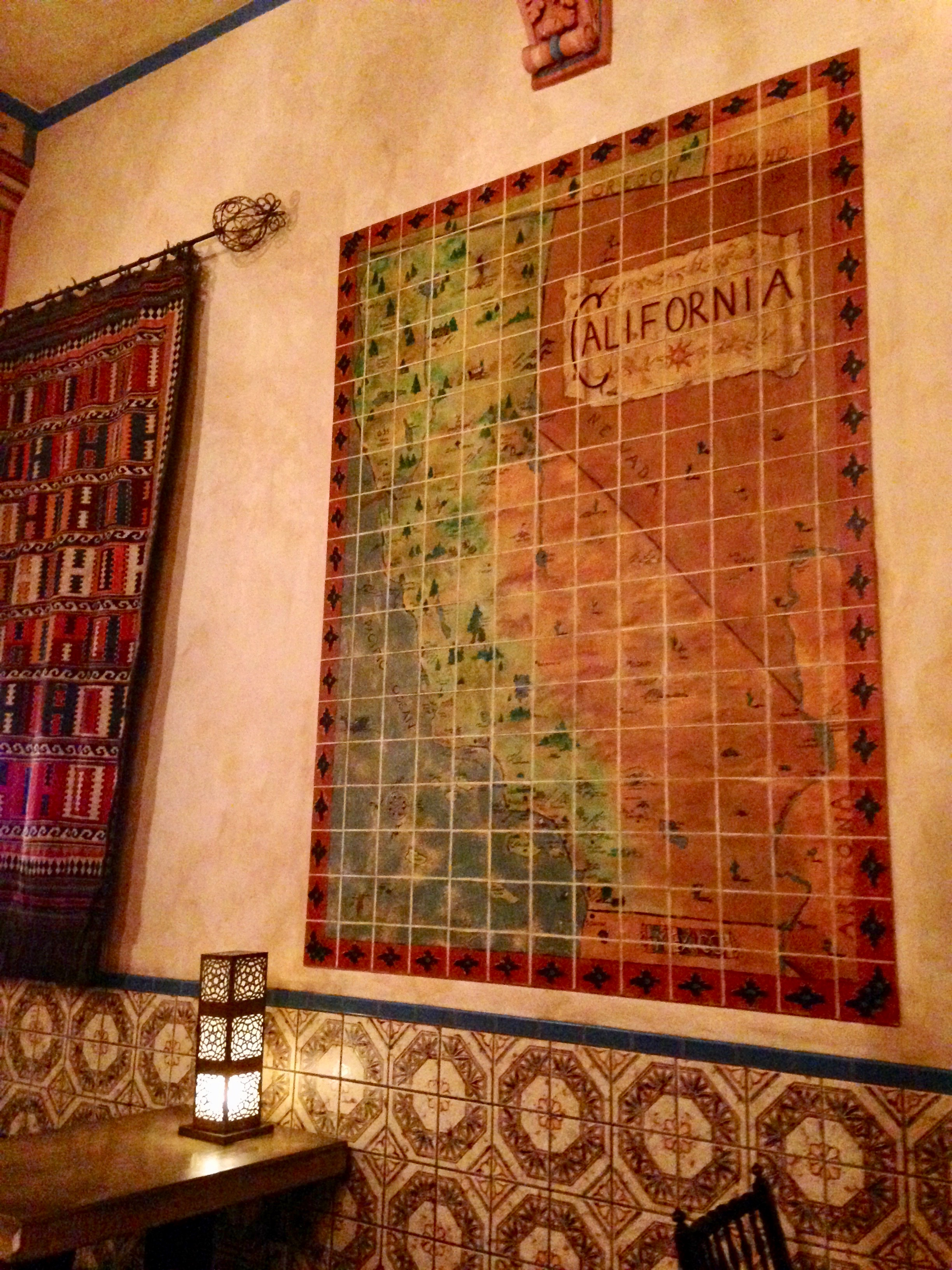
The lobby in Nov. 2014.

It was planned to undergo renovations in phases so that the hotel could stay open. However, in October 2015, the decision was made to shut down operations in order to overhaul the building. The renovation was started in November 2015 and was initially expected to last a year, but it was extended to three years during the restoration process, having a total cost of $60 million. The renovations were done by Santa Monica-based agency Studio Collective with help from Rockefeller Kempel Architects, who expanded the guestrooms and modernized the interior. The hotel was reopened in February 2018 with 268 rooms, two restaurants, and four bars. In 2020, it was used as a voting center during the COVID-19 pandemic in Los Angeles.

In December 2023, restaurant employees informed the management of their intention to establish a union. Six days later, Noble 33 announced the closure of their five hotel restaurants, with the workers filing a complaint with federal labor regulators alleging that the management was attempting to suppress labor organizing in the hotel. Noble 33 argued that the existence of a union within their restaurants would breach the hotel's current agreements and would harm both parties. However, the hotel denied the claim that the decision to terminate staff was influenced by its management, stating that the group would not have been requested nor authorized to do so. In April 2024, U.S. Senator Bernie Sanders joined striking hotel workers who demanded that hotels provide better pay and improve working conditions, as the hotel was one of 24 that had not reached an agreement with the workers since the start of the labor dispute. A new labor agreement, which also included some of the hotel restaurant employees, would be reached to end the strike at Hotel Figueroa in August 2024.

== Architecture ==
The hotel was designed by the architecture firm Stanton, Reed and Hibbard. The style has been described as Spanish Colonial or Mediterranean Revival architecture. Its height was capped at 13 stories (130 feet) to adhere to the city's height limit at the time of completion.

=== Exterior ===
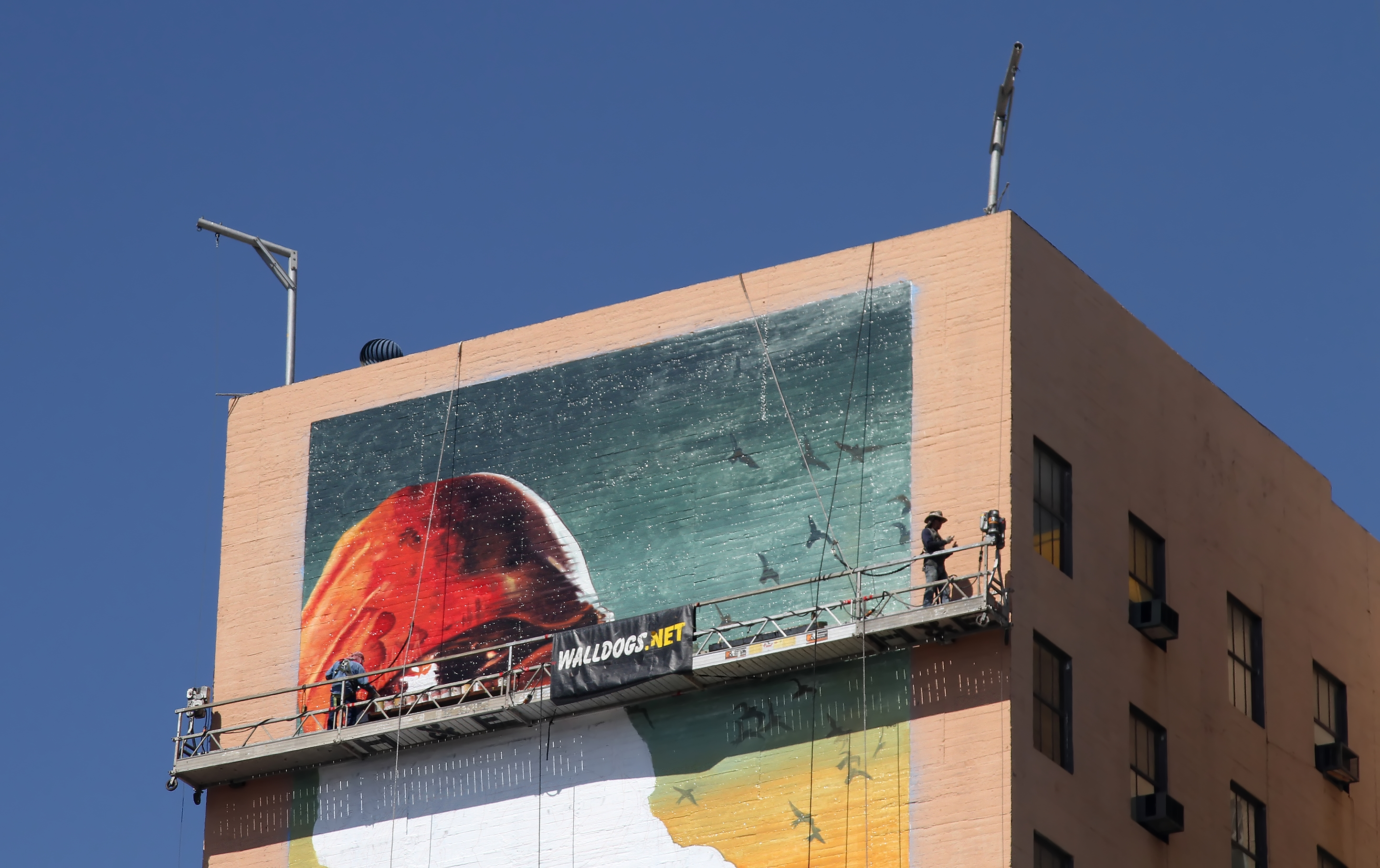
Sign painters create a new sign on the walls of the hotel, 2012.

The sides of the hotel serve as canvases for hand-painted advertisements, a practice that dates back to the 1980s. They have been painted by the company Walldogs, which has worked with the hotel since 1994 and has done advertising campaigns for Bethesda Softworks, Square Enix, and DICE. In 2008, the hotel briefly switched to using vinyl wallscapes, but this was stopped due to the city's crackdown on vinyl billboards lacking proper permits. The back of the building features a mural depicting plants, created by muralist Bella Gomez.

The exterior also features a coffin-shaped pool on the ground level, which is described as the only remaining hotel pool on the ground floor in the city due to changes in architectural regulations. The reason for the pool's shape is unknown, but according to the hotel's general manager, Connie Wang, there is a rumor suggesting it was "built in the shape of a coffin to bury the patriarchy".

=== Interior ===
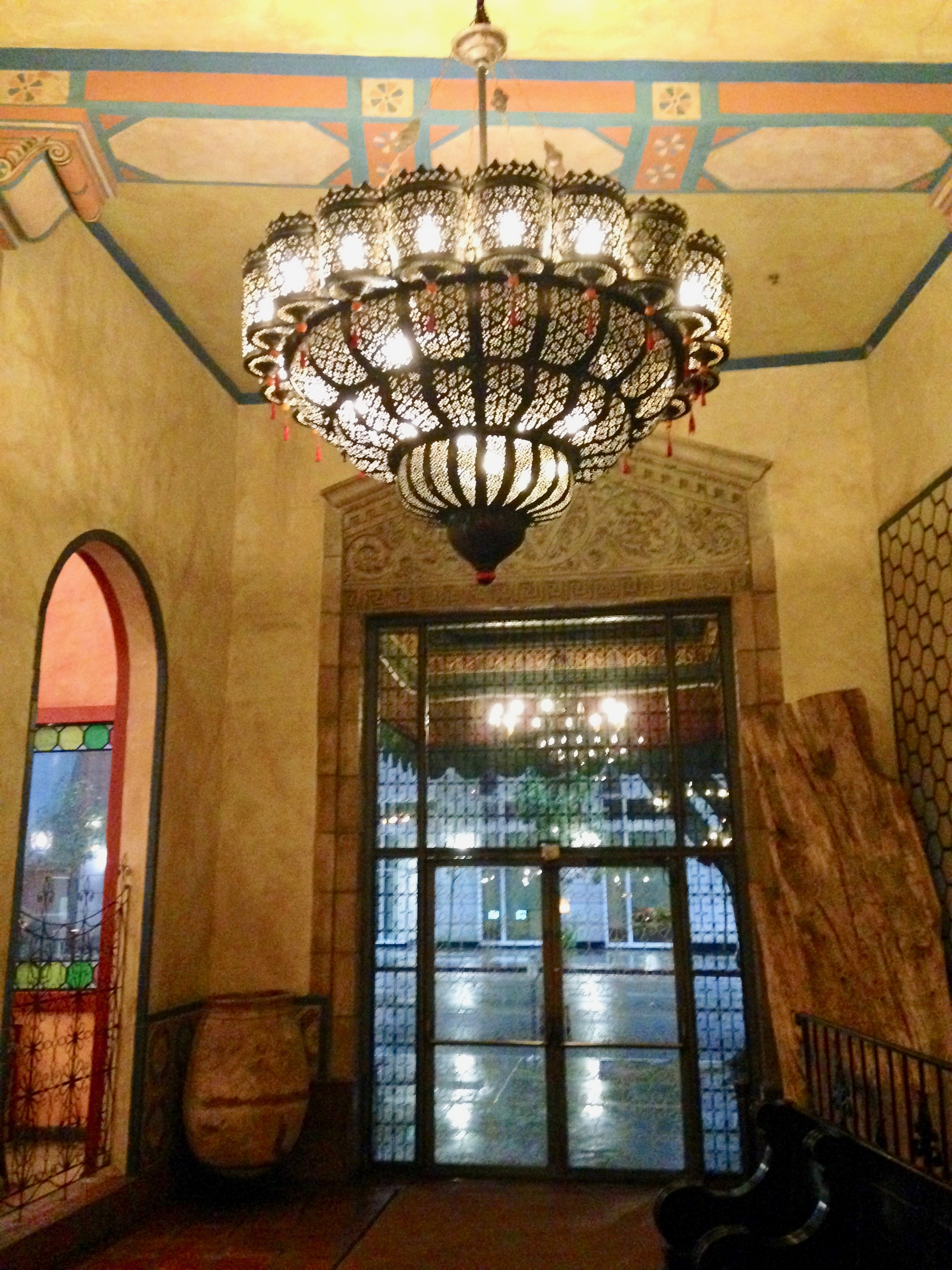
The front doors in November 2014.

From 1976 until 2014, the interior was decorated with Arabian-inspired items, such as fabric swags, carpets, jeweled lanterns, and colored glass. As part of the overhaul, a liquidation sale featuring the hotel's items took place from December 3 to December 31, 2015.

Upon the completion of its 2018 renovation, the hotel was described by the Los Angeles Times as having a "cozy, warm, and welcoming vibe", featuring numerous artworks by women displayed in the lobby and guestrooms. The interior design team restored the windows and refurbished skylights for nighttime illumination in the guestrooms, focusing on providing more comfortable beds and enhancing the bathrooms with artwork.

The hotel features pieces in the Featured Artists Exhibit, which highlights local female artists. Multiple local female artists have been featured in the hotel's art program, including Alison Van Pelt, Lily Stockman, Jesse Mockrin, Nancy Baker Cahill, and Alexandra Grant.

=== Restaurants and bars ===
Upon reopening after the 2014 renovation, Breva was the sole restaurant and Bar Figueroa was the only bar, with the Veranda and Bar Alta launching at later dates. In 2021, the hospitality group Noble 33 took over the food and beverage operations for the hotel, opening the Sparrow Italia brand within the hotel that same year.

== Reception and impact ==
In 2018, The Telegraph gave the hotel a score of 8/10, stating that the hotel's "current incarnation pays tribute to its history, with a strong emphasis on women's art". The New York Times wrote that "upscale boutique hotels are all about attention to detail, which seems to be a work in progress at the Figueroa". Business Insider wrote in 2020 that "when it comes to historic significance and flair, the Figueroa is tops in downtown Los Angeles", stating that the "highly walkable location adds major convenience points with an address across the street from the buzzing L.A. Live entertainment complex, and the Los Angeles Convention Center and Staples Center just yards further". In 2022, Cosmopolitan wrote that Hotel Figueroa was "a charming boutique hotel with plenty of leather accent and abstract art".

The hotel's restaurant Sparrow Italia was featured in multiple Thrillist lists, with one list writing that the "historic Hotel Figueroa's coastal Italian eatery set on a sexy covered patio is highlighting its Italian-Med menu during DineLA with a three-course feast".

The hotel served as a filming location for the television series True Blood and for the music video of Prince's 2004 song "A Million Days."

== Gallery ==
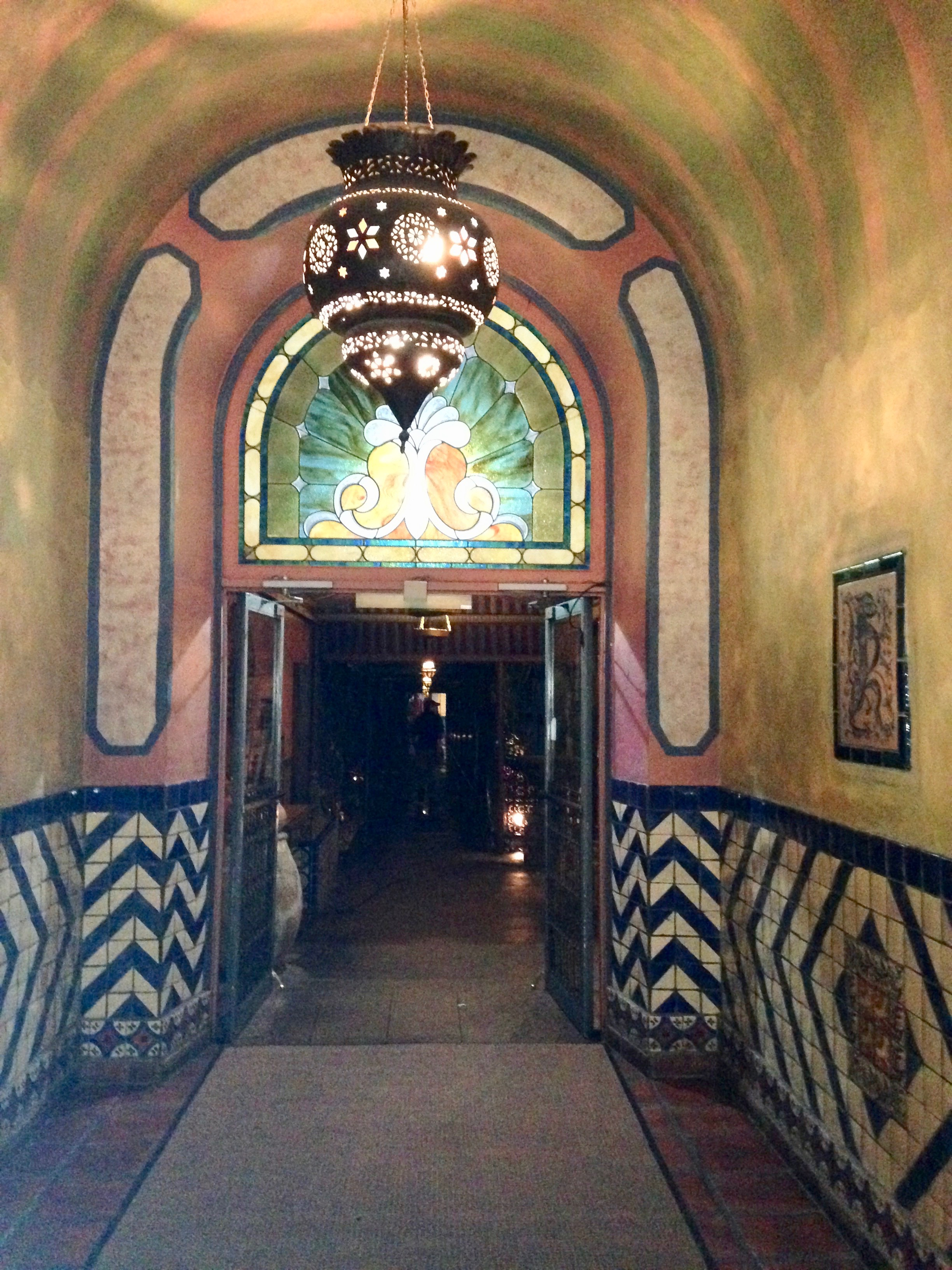

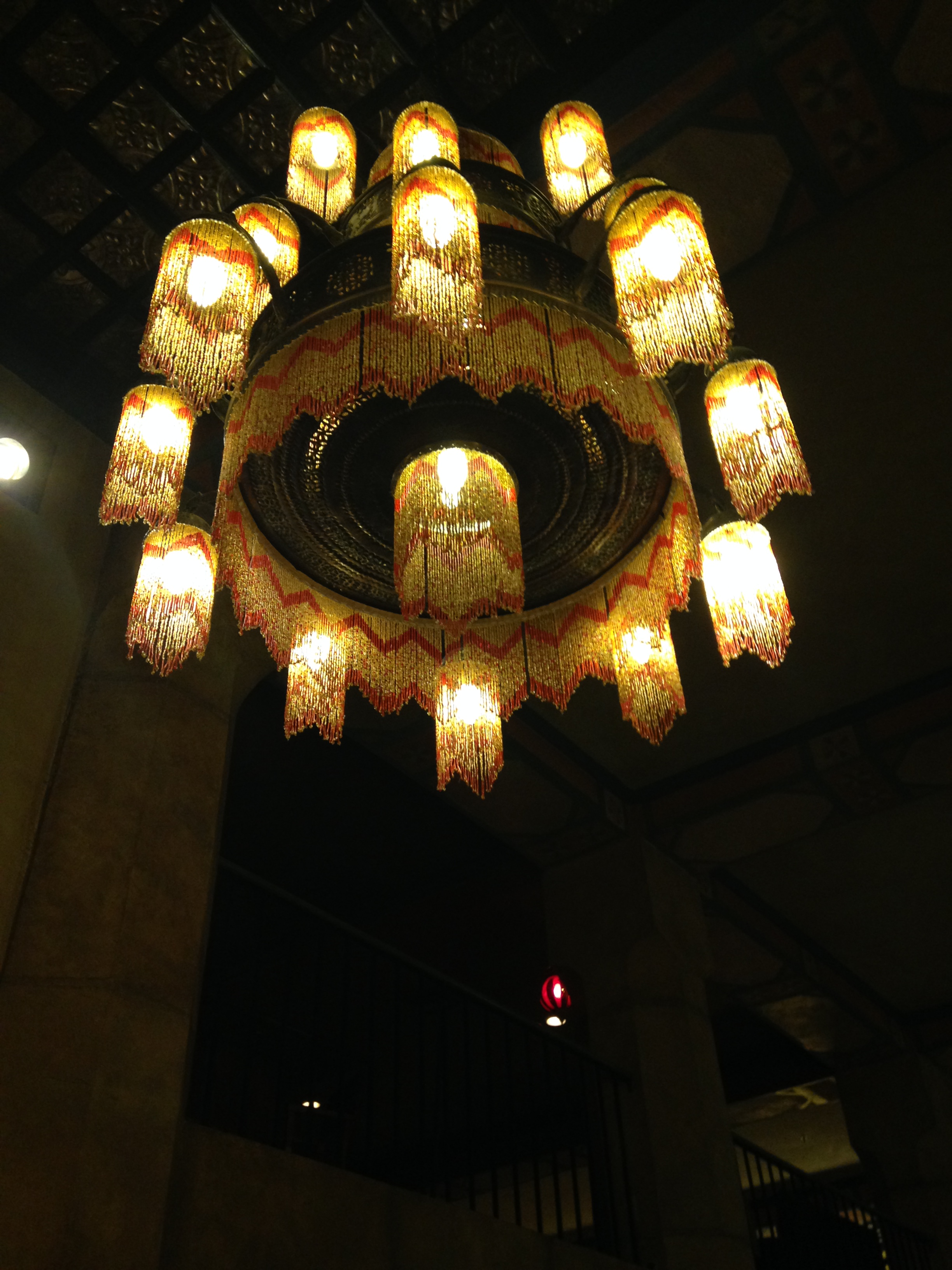

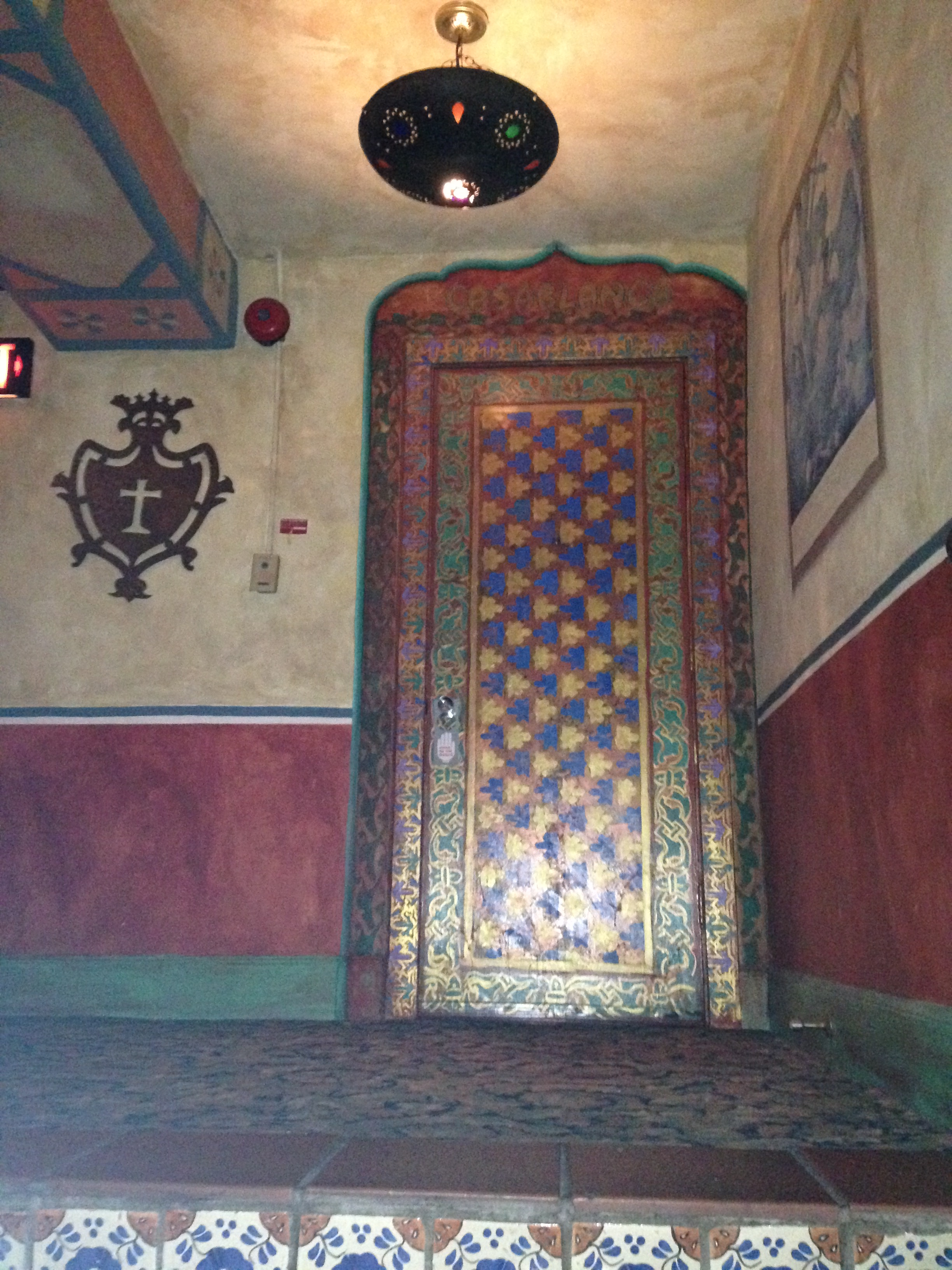

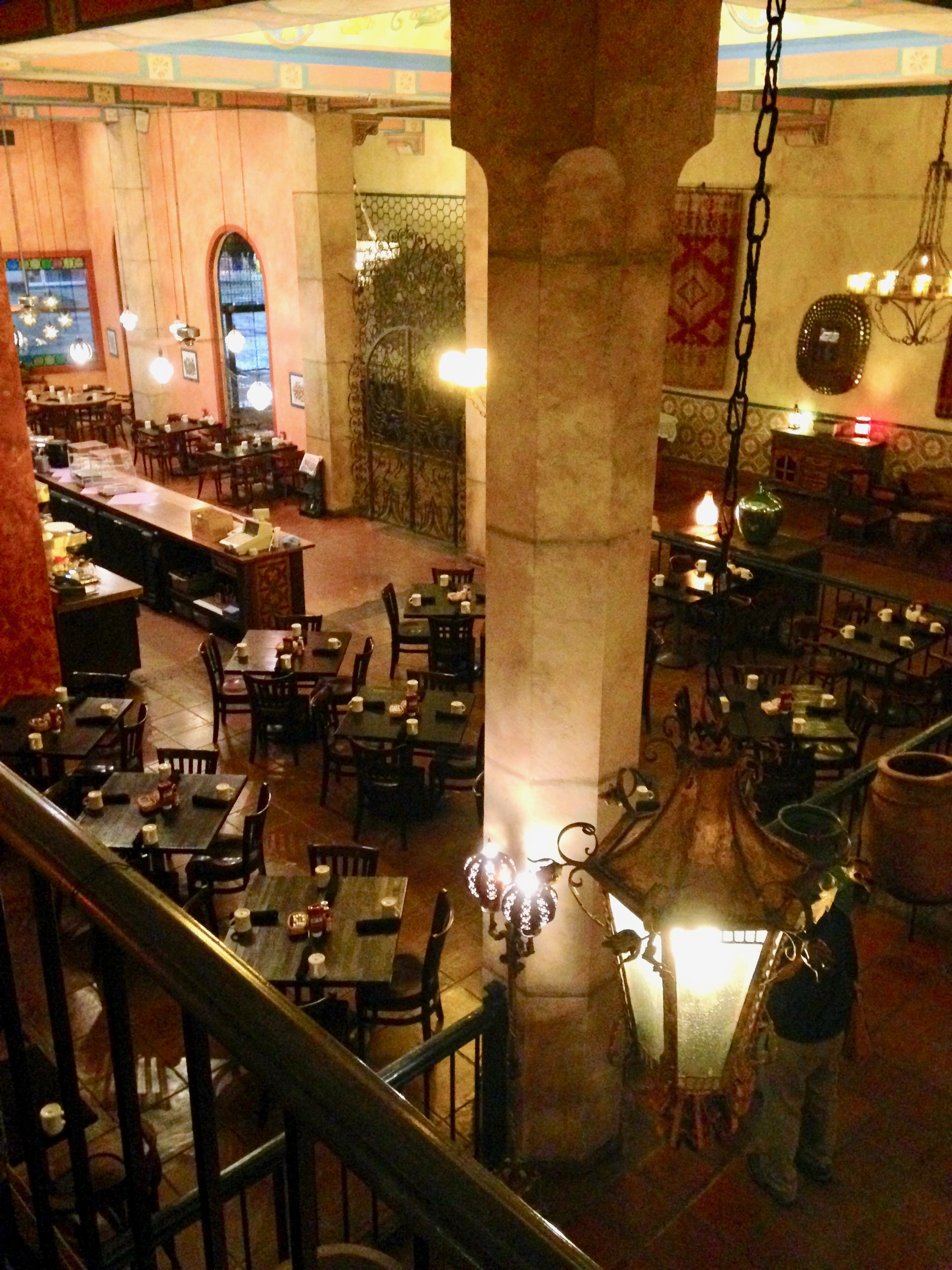

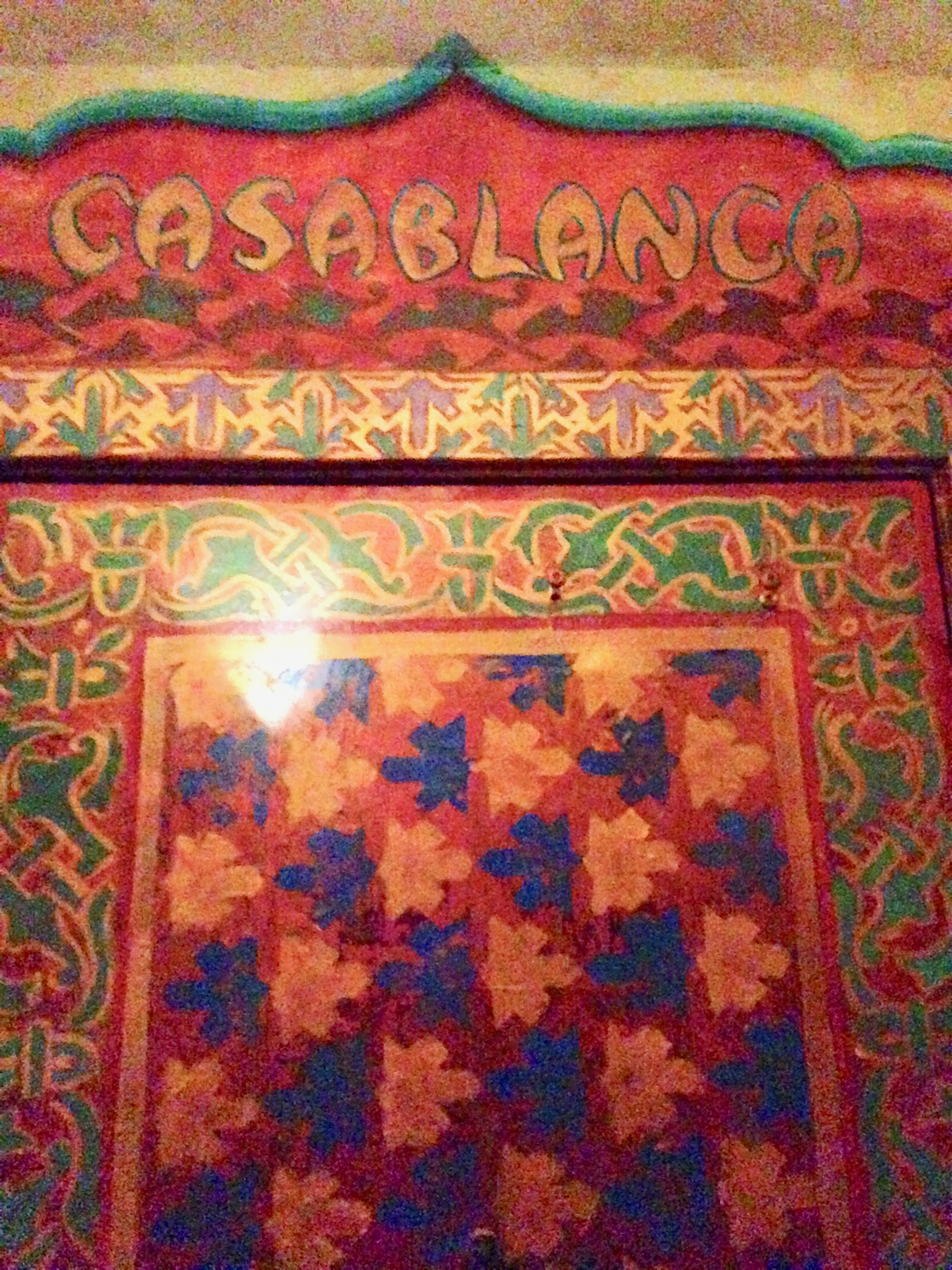

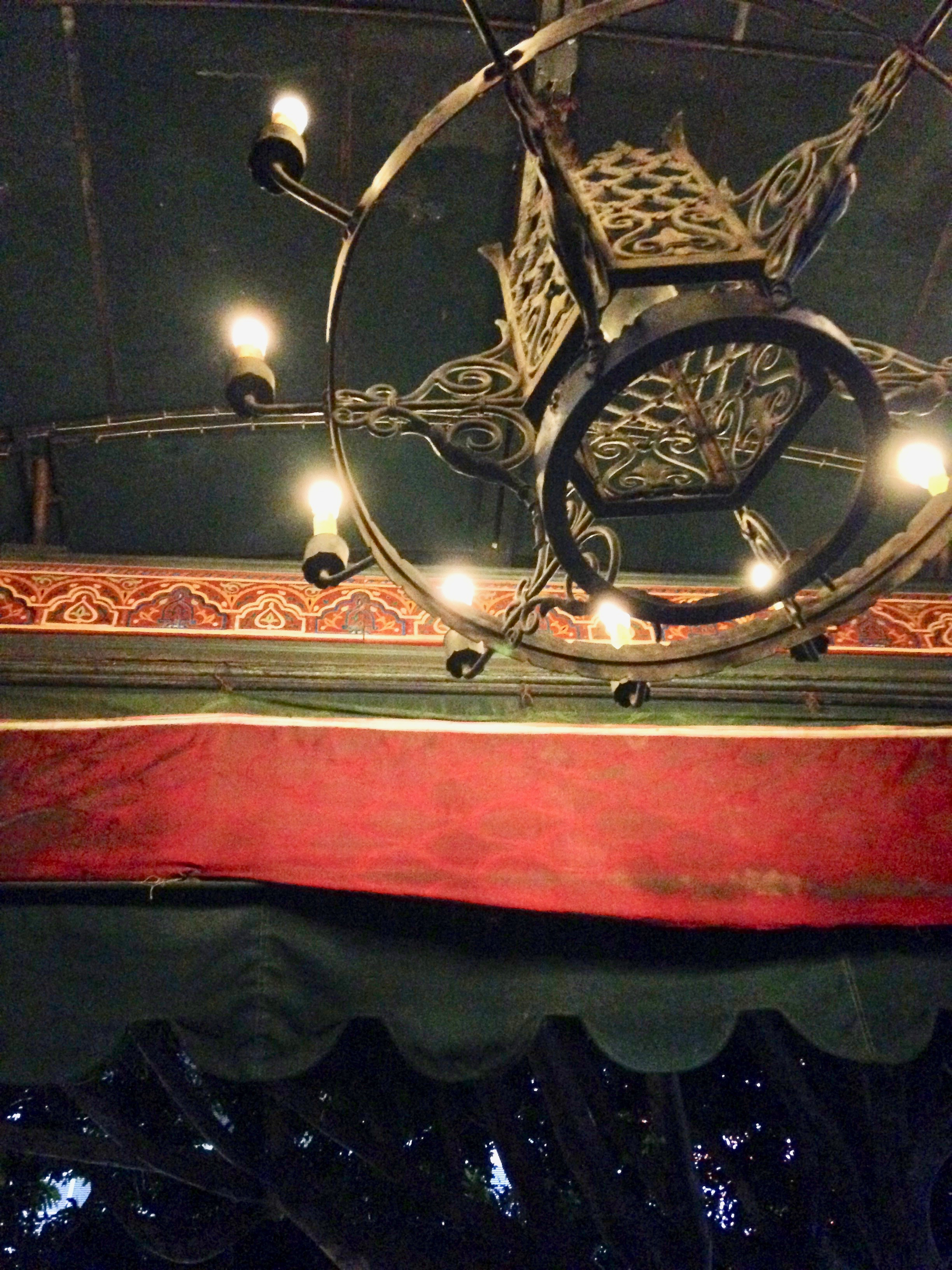
