= South Park (Downtown Los Angeles) =

Neighborhood in Los Angeles, California

- Neighborhood
- South Park in Downtown Los Angeles

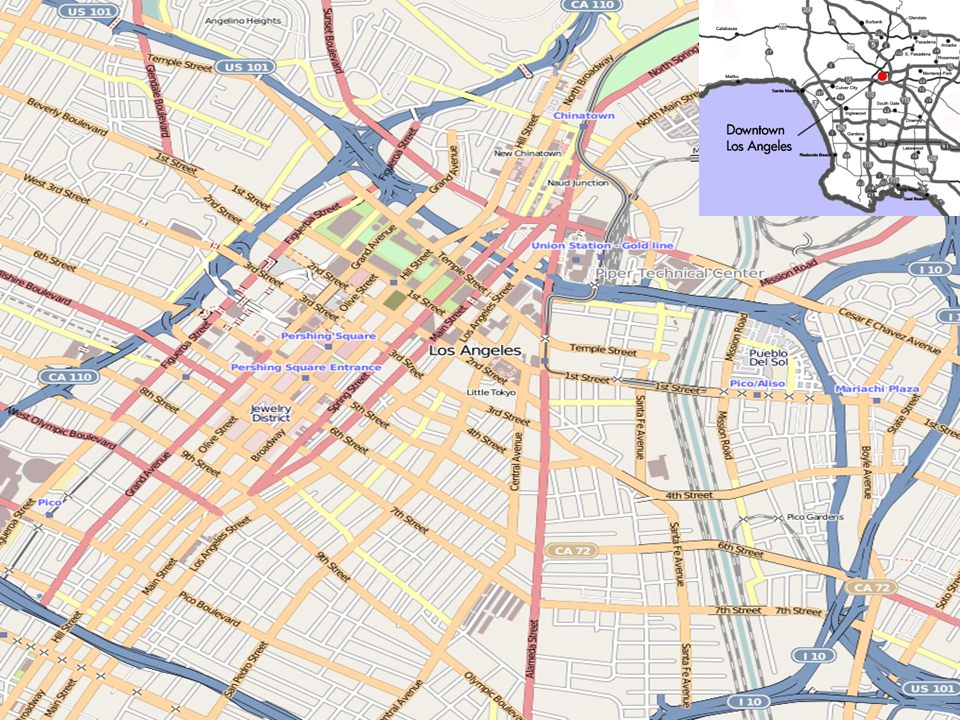
- Location within Downtown Los Angeles
- Coordinates: 34.041304°N 118.261989°W
- Country: United States
- State: California
- County: County of Los Angeles
- City: Los Angeles
- Area code: 213

South Park is a commercial district in southwestern Downtown Los Angeles, California. It is the location of the Los Angeles Convention Center, the Crypto.com Arena, and the "L.A. Live" entertainment complex.

== History ==
At the beginning of the 21st century the area began to rapidly transform with infill development. Luxury apartments and condominiums with ground floor retail began construction in the 2000s. The district's proximity to the University of Southern California, as well as the A Line and E Line light rail lines, have made it an attractive area for young professionals. As with many neighborhood transformations, this change in demographics has many concerned about displacement and gentrification issues.

== Geography ==
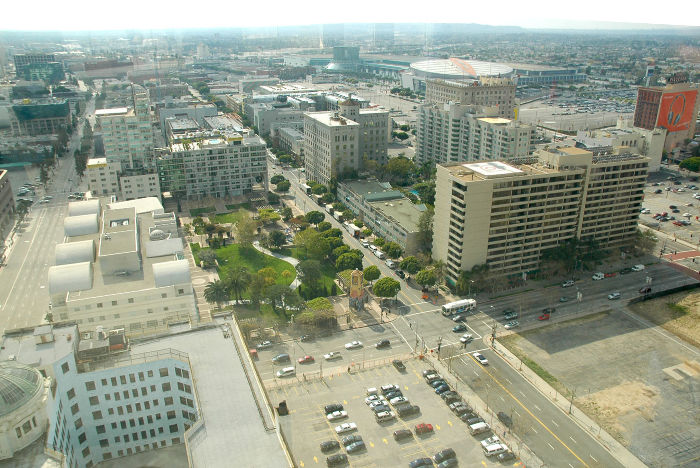
Aerial of South Park in 2005

According to the City of Los Angeles:

The District includes all property within a boundary that begins on the north at 9th Street and the 110 Freeway and runs east to Flower Street then south to Olympic Boulevard, east on Olympic Boulevard to mid-block across Hill Street then south to 11th Street then east to mid-block across Broadway forming the northern boundary. From there the eastern boundary runs south across 12th Street, past Pico Boulevard, past 14th Street, past 15th Street, across Venice Boulevard to the centerline of 17th Street. From there the southern boundary runs west along 17th Street/Santa Monica (10) Freeway across Broadway, past Hill Street, past Olive Street, past Grand Avenue, past Hope Street, past Flower Street, across Figueroa Street to behind the Convention Center along Convention Center Drive. From there the western boundary runs north along L.A. Live Way (Cherry Street) across Pico Boulevard, past 12th Street, past Chick Hearn Court (11th Street) across Olympic Boulevard to 9th Street and the Harbor (110) Freeway."

Bordering the district are Pico-Union on the west, West Adams on the southwest, South Los Angeles district on the southeast, the Warehouse District on the southeast, and the Financial District on the northeast. Major thoroughfares include Venice, Pico and Olympic Boulevards, Grand Avenue, and Figueroa Street. The A Line light rail and E Line light rail stop in the district at the Pico/Chick Hearn station.

== Transportation ==
The Los Angeles County Metropolitan Transportation Authority, and LADOT (DASH & Commuter Express) provide heavy rail (subway), light rail, and local bus services throughout South Park and to the Greater Los Angeles Area. The area is also served by Montebello Bus Lines Line 50, Foothill Transit Silver Streak (bus) and Line 465, and Big Blue Bus Line Rapid 10.

The neighborhood is served by the A Line (Los Angeles Metro) and E Line (Los Angeles Metro) via the Pico station.

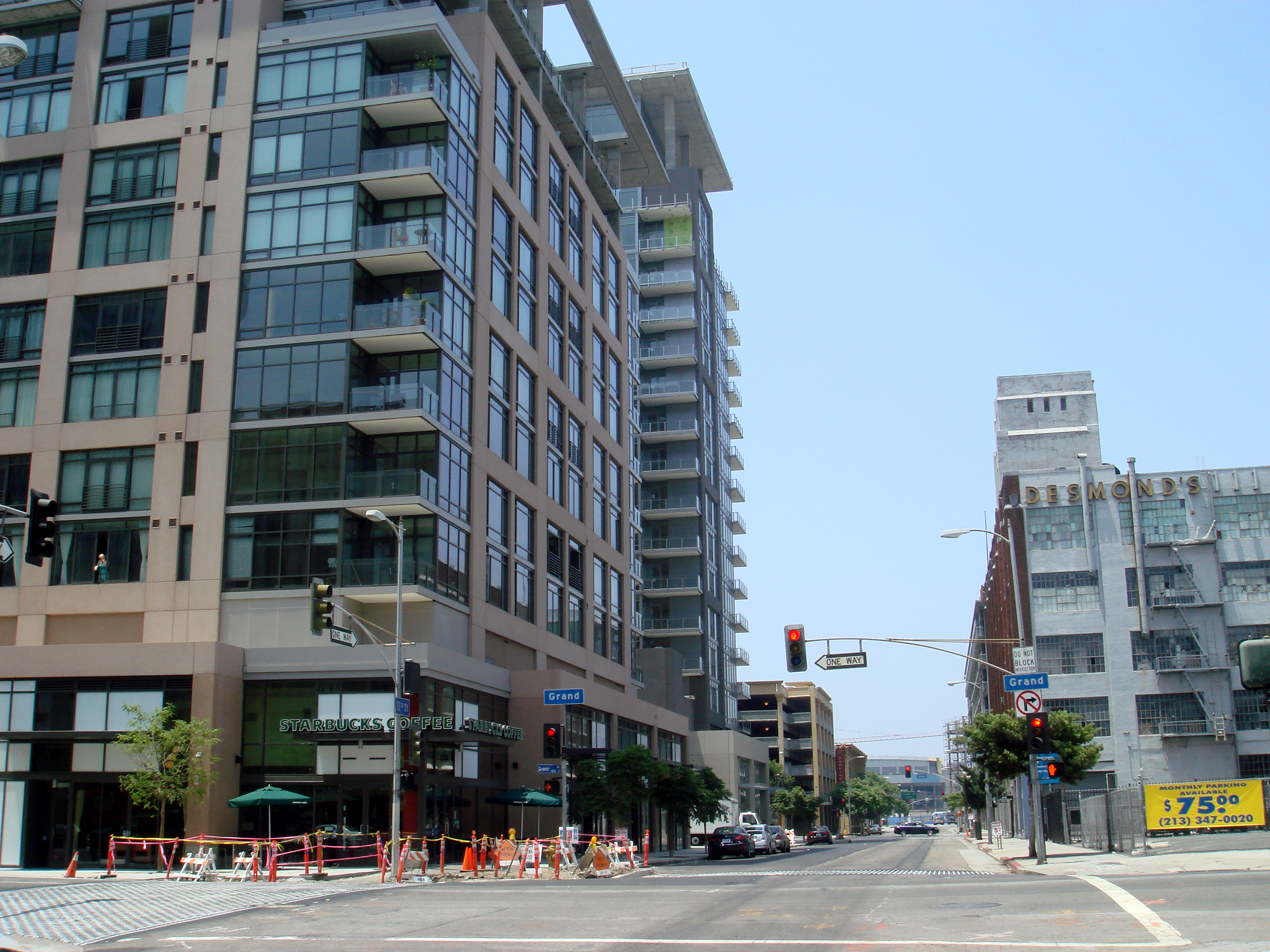
Downtown development in South Park.

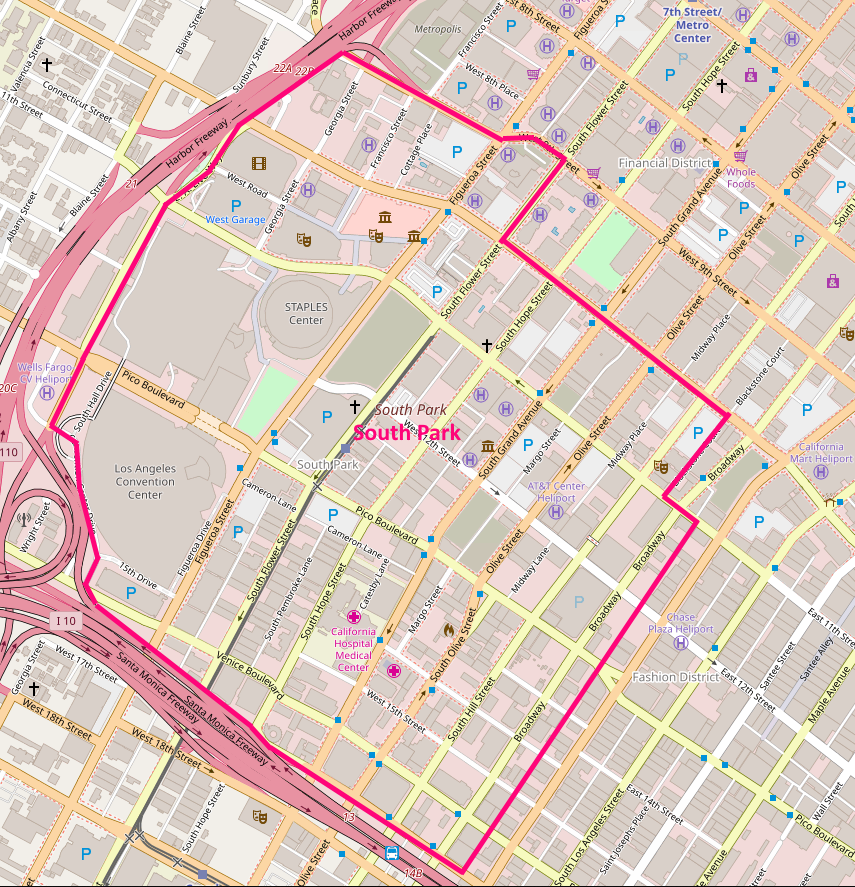
The boundaries of the business improvement district (or 'BID') in Los Angeles of the name "South Park".

== Notable Buildings ==
- Crypto.com Arena
- L.A. Live
- Los Angeles Convention Center
- Circa Complex
- Oceanwide Plaza
- Hotel Figueroa
- TCW Tower
- Grand Hope Park
- Federal Reserve Los Angeles
- Fashion Institute of Design & Merchandising
- Mayan Theater
- Belasco Theater (Los Angeles)
- South Park Center
- California Hospital Medical Center
