= Hazard's Pavilion =

Former auditorium in Los Angeles

Coordinates: 34.049463°N 118.252865°W

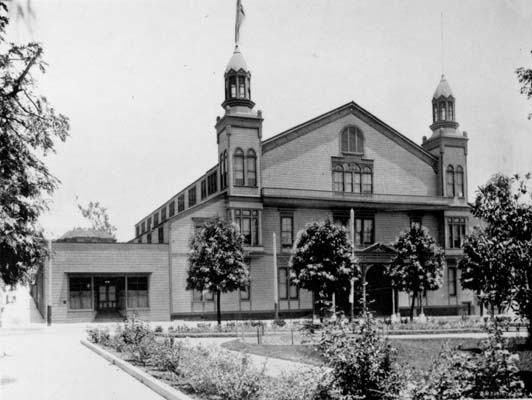
Hazard's Pavilion (demolished in 1906)

Hazard's Pavilion was a large auditorium in Los Angeles, California, at the intersection of Fifth and Olive Streets. Showman George "Roundhouse" Lehman had planned to construct a large theatre center on the land he purchased at this location, but he went broke and the property was sold to the City Attorney (and soon to be Mayor), Henry T. Hazard. The venue was built in 1887 by architects Kysor, Morgan & Walls at a cost of $25,000, a large amount for the time, and seated up to 4,000 people (some sources say that seating could be up to 8,000; the building was divided into two galleries, and perhaps each accommodated 4,000). The building was constructed of wood with a clapboard exterior, and the front was framed by two towers.

== Hazard's Pavilion ==
As the largest building of its type in Los Angeles at the time, Hazard's Pavilion was a venue for conventions, political meetings, lectures, fairs, religious meetings, concerts, operas, balls, and sports events. It opened in April, 1887 with a modest civic flower festival, but a month later it hosted the National Opera Company with 300 singers, ballet dancers, and musicians. The Pavilion hosted regular religious meetings, including a series in 1888 where famed evangelist Dwight L. Moody spoke. In attendance at one of these meetings was Harry A. Ironside, which led him to becoming a world-famous preacher in his own right. Booker T. Washington, William Jennings Bryan and Carrie Nation were among the famous people who spoke to crowds gathered at Hazard's Pavilion. The great Italian operatic singer Enrico Caruso performed there.

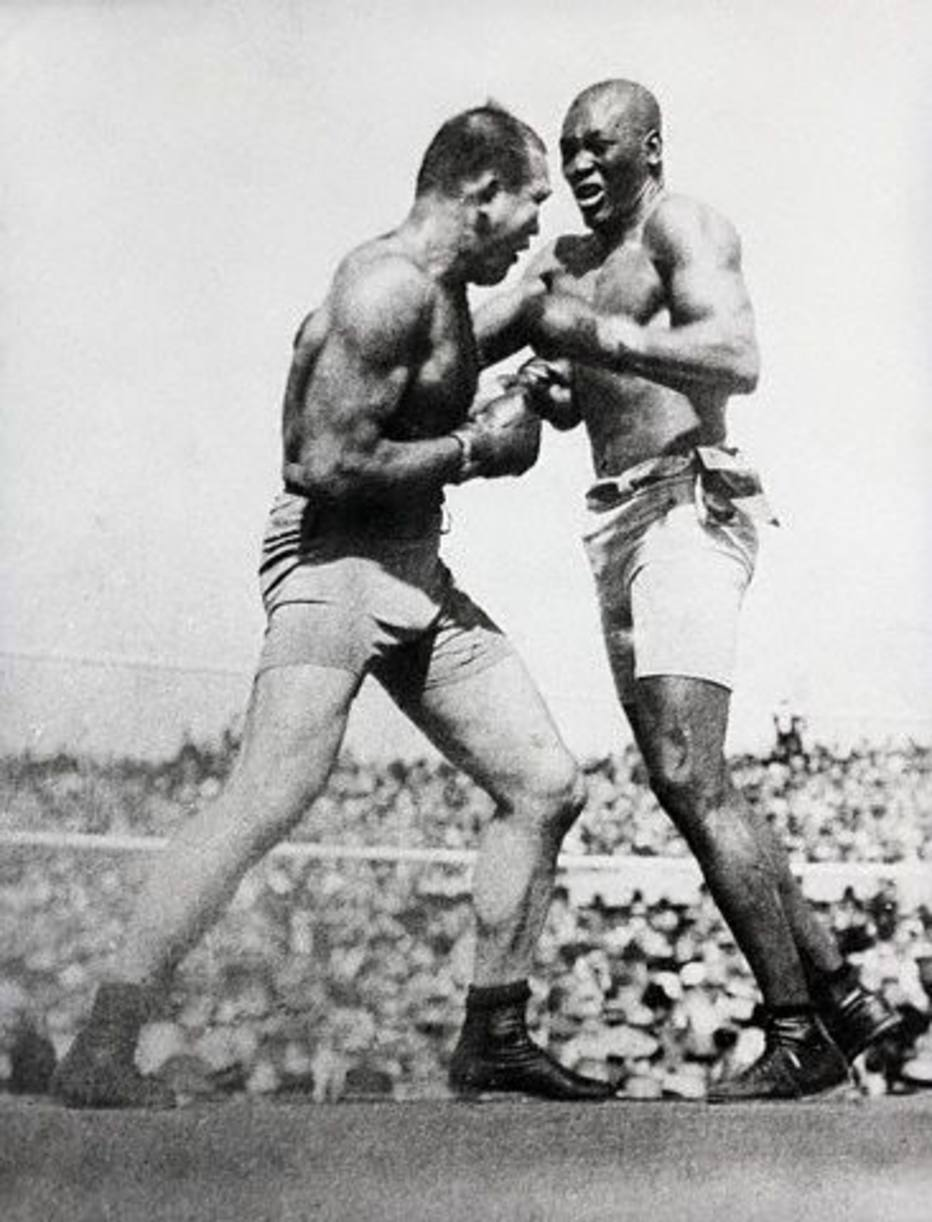
Jack Johnson vs Jim Jeffries (Reno, 1910)

From 1901 to 1904, the first great Los Angeles boxing promoter, Uncle Tom McCarey, staged his first boxing shows at the pavilion. It would be McCarey who put the Los Angeles area on the map as a major boxing venue. Many famous boxers fought at the Pavilion. The future World Heavyweight Champion, Jim Jeffries, had only one fully recorded bout in Los Angeles, his hometown, when he fought Joe Goddard there in 1898. The man who would go on to be the first African-American World Heavyweight Champion, Jack Johnson, fought in eight main events on cards staged by Tom McCarey at the pavilion during a period from 1902 to 1904. Other famous fighters who had bouts at Hazard's Pavilion include Joe Bernstein, Frank Childs, Kid McCoy, Hank Griffin, Dixie Kid, Denver Ed Martin, Sam McVey, Al Neill, Frankie Neil, Solly Smith, Joe Walcott, and Billy Woods.

In 1892, James J. Corbett fought in an exhibition bout with his sparring partner, Jim Daly at Hazard's Pavilion. Later in the same year, Corbett would go on to win the World Heavyweight Title from the then-champion, John L. Sullivan. Also at the pavilion, Ex-World Heavyweight Bob Fitzsimmons had one exhibition bout while Jim Jeffries had two, one of them as the World Heavyweight Champion.

In late 1904, the Temple Baptist Church leased the pavilion, changing its name to Temple Auditorium, at a time when churches were generally opposed to professional boxing. As a result, Tom McCarey was forced to find another venue for his boxing shows, a tough proposition because the site could not be located near residential areas, but it also had to be located near trolley lines. It would be late 1905 when McCarey staged his first card at a new pavilion located on North Main Street in the Naud Junction area.

== Clune's Auditorium ==
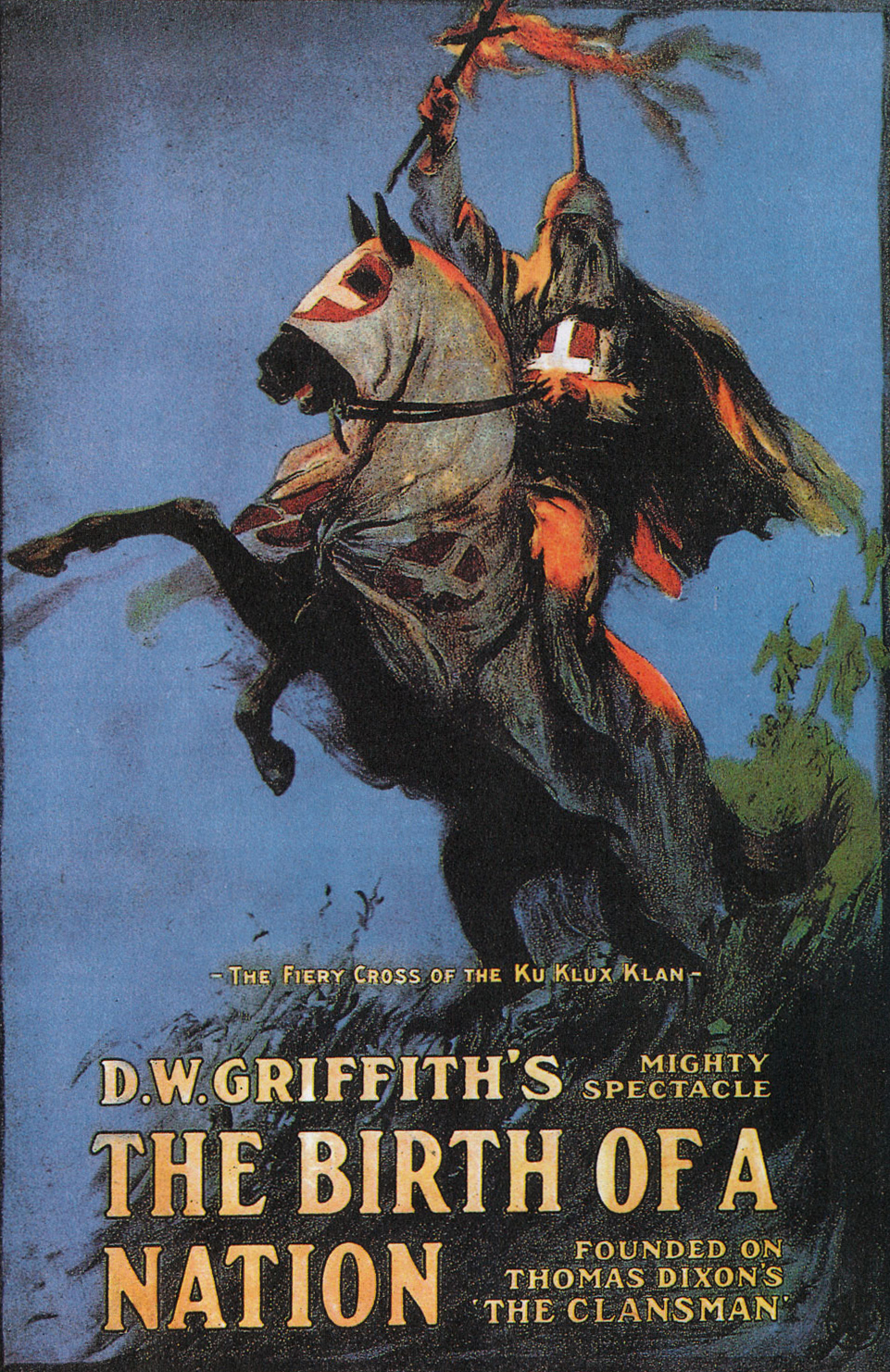
The Birth of a Nation (1915)

In 1906, Hazard's Pavilion was demolished to make way for a new Temple Auditorium. The architect, Charles F. Whittlesey, and civil engineers John B. Leonard and C. R. Harris, created a building with a Spanish Gothic exterior and a vast auditorium with a simplified Art-Nouveau interior influenced by Louis Sullivan's Chicago Auditorium. Opened on November 7, 1906, with a performance of Aida, this was the largest reinforced concrete structure with the only cantilevered balcony in the world. It had the largest stage west of New York when it was completed, and it seated 2,600 people. A nine-story office block and retail shops were part of the complex.

For a number of years during the 1910s, Billy Clune presented silent films in the auditorium, then called Clune's Auditorium or sometimes Clune's Theatre Beautiful. The landmark pro-Ku Klux Klan film The Birth of a Nation had its world premiere at Clune's Auditorium on its way to becoming a massive success.

== Philharmonic Auditorium ==
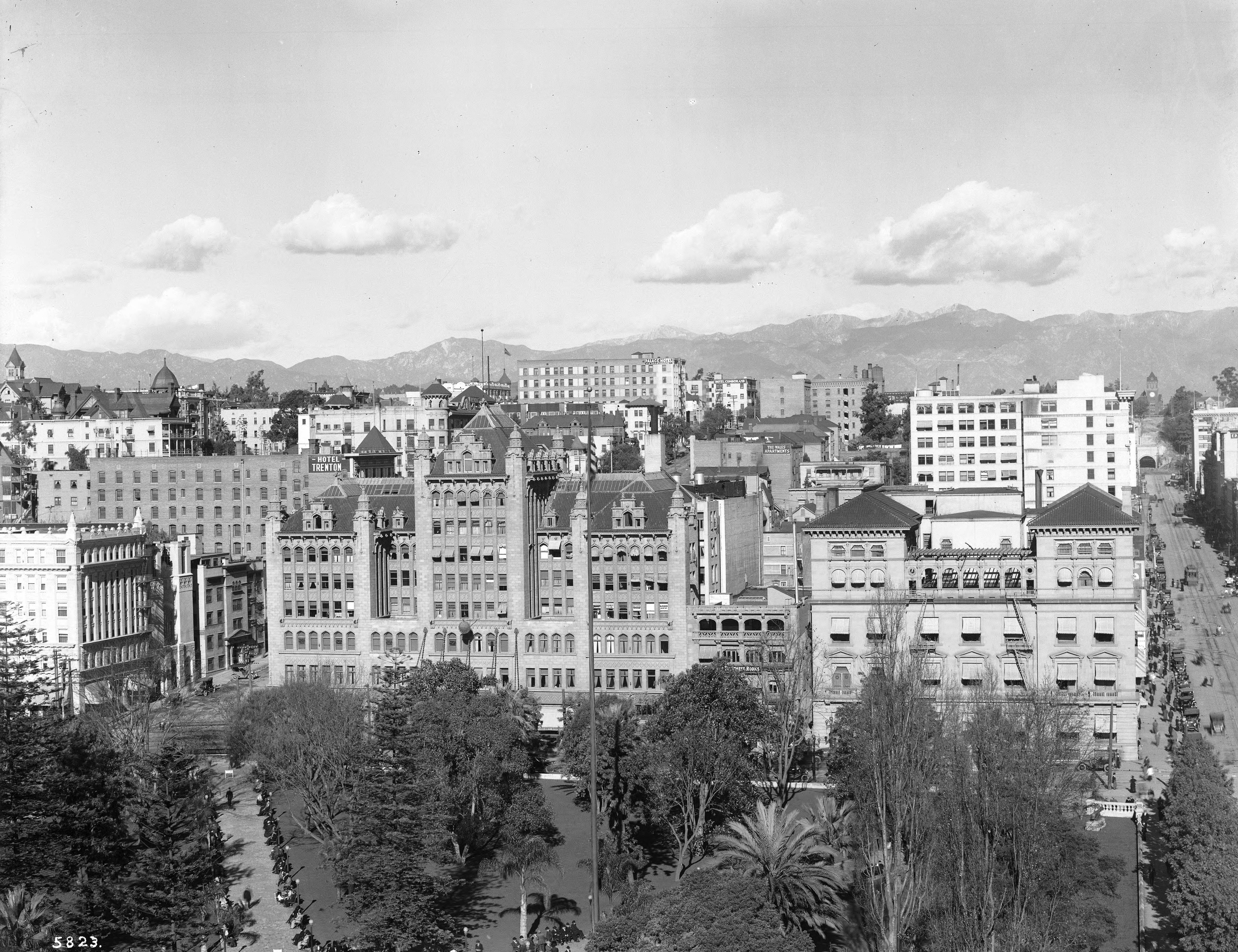
Philharmonic Auditorium, on the left beyond Pershing Square.

When the Los Angeles Philharmonic Orchestra began its second season in 1920, it chose Clune's Auditorium as its home, which became known as the Philharmonic Auditorium. It was remodeled in 1938 by Claud Beelman. The mansard roof was removed, the building was given a moderne facade, and the main entrance was moved to Olive Street. The orchestra played there for 4 decades before the Dorothy Chandler Pavilion was built in 1963. The Philharmonic Auditorium was demolished in 1985. Although the site has been a parking lot for decades, San Francisco real estate investment firm MacFarlane Partners announced in 2014 that the Park Fifth development was going ahead with 650 units in a high-rise apartment building that would face historic Pershing Square. An outdoor paseo with tables, chairs, and lighting would be built between the new complex and historic Subway Terminal Building, which has been re-purposed as the Metro 417 apartments Due to the great recession of 2008, Park Fifth was not constructed as planned, a smaller 24 story apartment complex renamed Five-Oh is currently under construction on the site as of 2017.
