= Park Fifth Towers =

Coordinates: 34.04825°N 118.25301°W

Park Fifth is a residential high-rise development overlooking Pershing Square in Los Angeles that opened in summer 2019.

== History ==
The site of Park Fifth at 5th and Olive streets is the site of the former Hazard's Pavilion, which was demolished to build Temple Auditorium, later renamed Clune's Auditorium, which was the historic home to the Los Angeles Philharmonic. It was demolished by developer David Houk in 1985 to make way for an office and hotel complex. The office boom of the '80s collapsed before Houk could build on the site. The site was to directly block the historic Subway Terminal Building, the original home of the Los Angeles Red Cars.

Park Fifth was originally planned as a $1 billion double tower luxury residential high-rise condominium complex. The skyscrapers were to be part of the revitalization boom in Downtown Los Angeles. Park Fifth 1 would have been a 732 residential unit tower. Park Fifth 2 would have been the shorter tower reaching 43 stories, both connected by a 15-story residential bridge. The Park Fifth project would have also included a five-star hotel.

The initial Environmental Impact Report from the Los Angeles Community Redevelopment Agency indicated significant negative impacts on the city's pedestrian and traffic conditions, historical and aesthetic concerns, and the local water table. A more extensive Environmental Impact Report addressing these issues was drafted in February, 2008. In June 2008, the project had received entitlements and city council approval. The project would have been built by Turner Construction, who built Library Tower, at 633 West Fifth Street, which at the time was the largest building west of Chicago. The project was designed by the New York architectural firm of Kohn Pedersen Fox (KPF).

Erika Nelson, vice president of marketing for Park Fifth, revealed that construction was delayed until later in 2008 due to financing problems, delays in environmental impact reports, and entitlement processes. A slow housing market, troubled economy, and slump in downtown Los Angeles revitalization had put many new projects on hold indefinitely.

October 4, 2008, David Houk said he would break ground on the project next year if he could secure funding, implying that the previous financiers had backed out. October 20, 2008 Rich Marr, project manager, stated that the project had been pushed back to the second quarter of 2009, citing the need for more capital and to finish engineering and architectural work. December 12, 2008, Namco, the main financier of the project, was facing legal action for fraud and breach of contract and would not be investing in Park Fifth. The other investor, Africa Israel Investments was expected to pull out of the project. Citing lack of funding, a poor economy, and lack of public interest, developer David Houk conceded, "We have construction financing available, but don't have anybody to sign it because we don't have partners."

In June 2009, the owners put the property up for sale. In 2014, the new owner, San Francisco real estate investment firm MacFarlane Partners, announced that the Park Fifth development was going ahead with 650 units in a high-rise apartment building.

== See also ==
- Grand Avenue Project
