= Nagoya Clock Tower =

Clock tower in Los Angeles, California, U.S.

Coordinates: 34°3′8.3″N 118°14′35″W

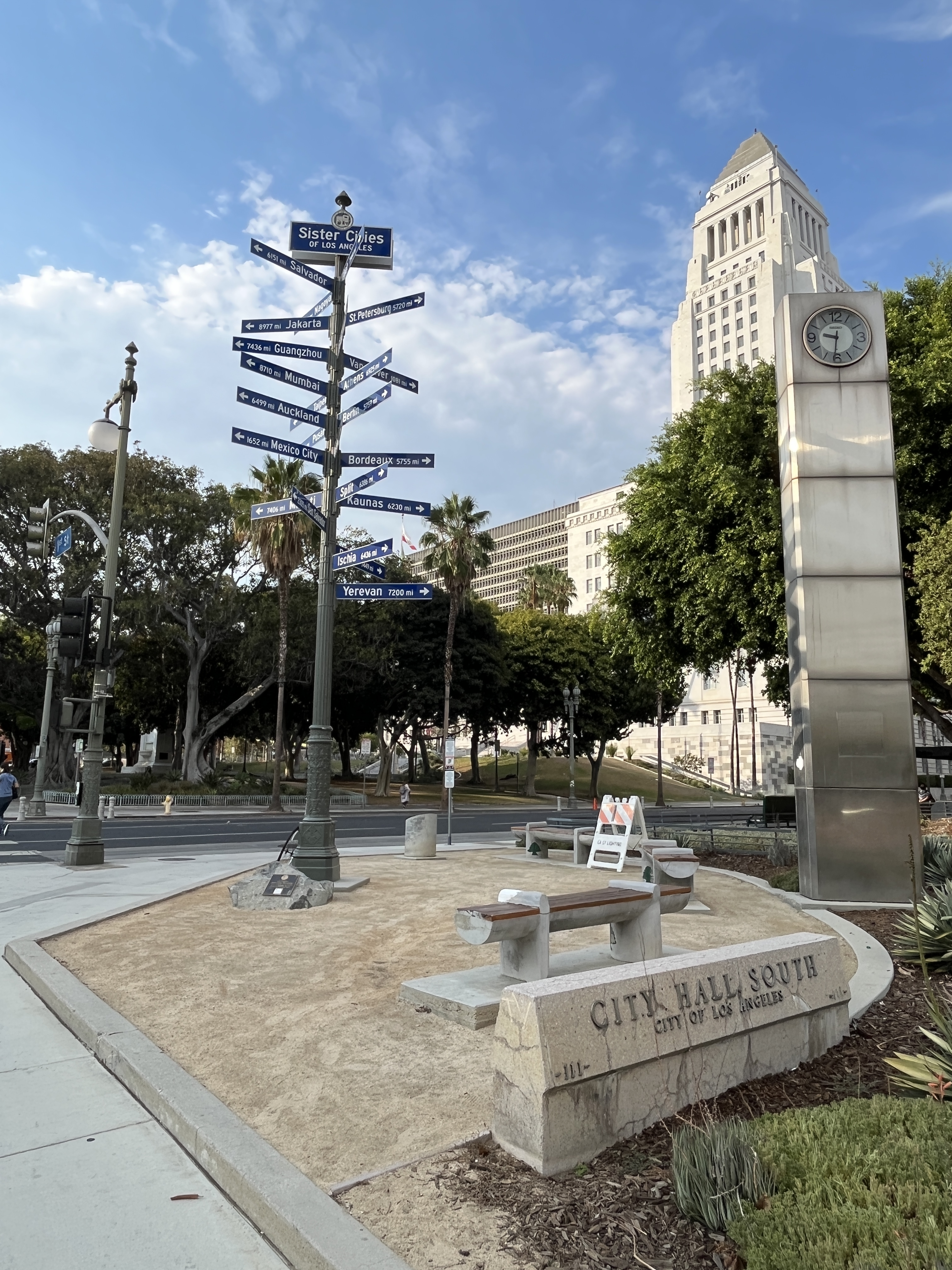
- The clock tower next to the Los Angeles Sister Cities Monument, 2022
- Interactive map of the Nagoya Clock Tower area

General information
- Type: Clock tower
- Location: California

The Nagoya Clock Tower is a clock tower in Los Angeles' Civic Center, in the U.S. state of California. The clock was gifted by the people of Nagoya to those of Los Angeles in 1984, on the 25th anniversary of the Sister City program.

== See also ==
- Los Angeles Sister Cities Monument, nearby fingerpost commemorating sister cities
