= Los Angeles Sister Cities Monument =

Fingerpost in Los Angeles, California, U.S.

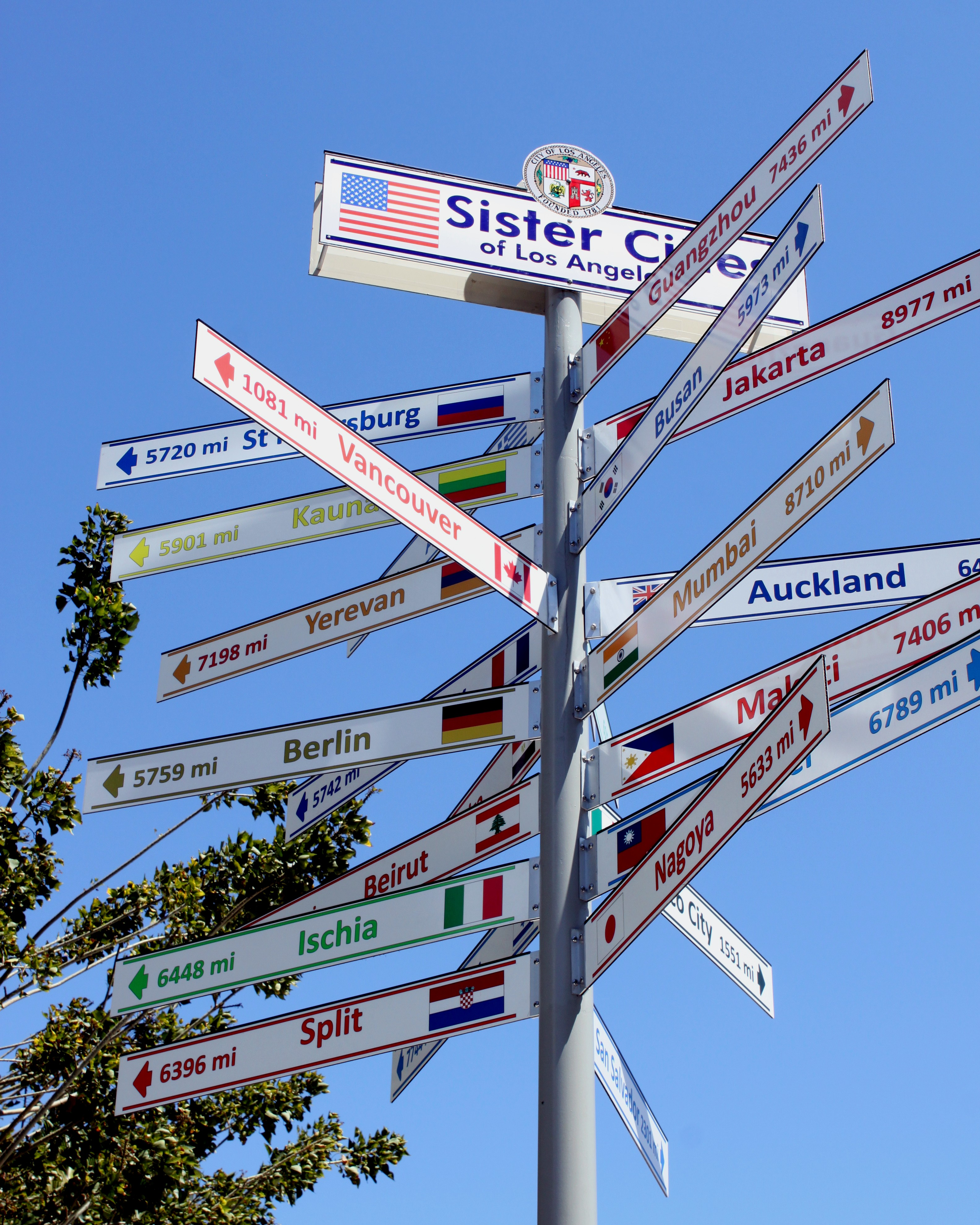
- The monument in 2012
- Coordinates: 34°3′8.2″N 118°14′35.3″W

The Los Angeles Sister Cities Monument, also known as the Sister Cities of Los Angeles Monument, is a fingerpost and monument in Los Angeles' Civic Center, in the U.S. state of California. The monument was designed by Brigid LaBonge in 2002. Installed at the corner of 1st and Main, in front of South City Hall and across from Los Angeles City Hall, the fingerpost displays the names and distances of Los Angeles' sister cities.

== See also ==
- Nagoya Clock Tower, nearby clock tower commemorating a sister city relationship
