= Yorkshire Hotel =

Building in Los Angeles, California

- U.S. Historic district – Contributing property
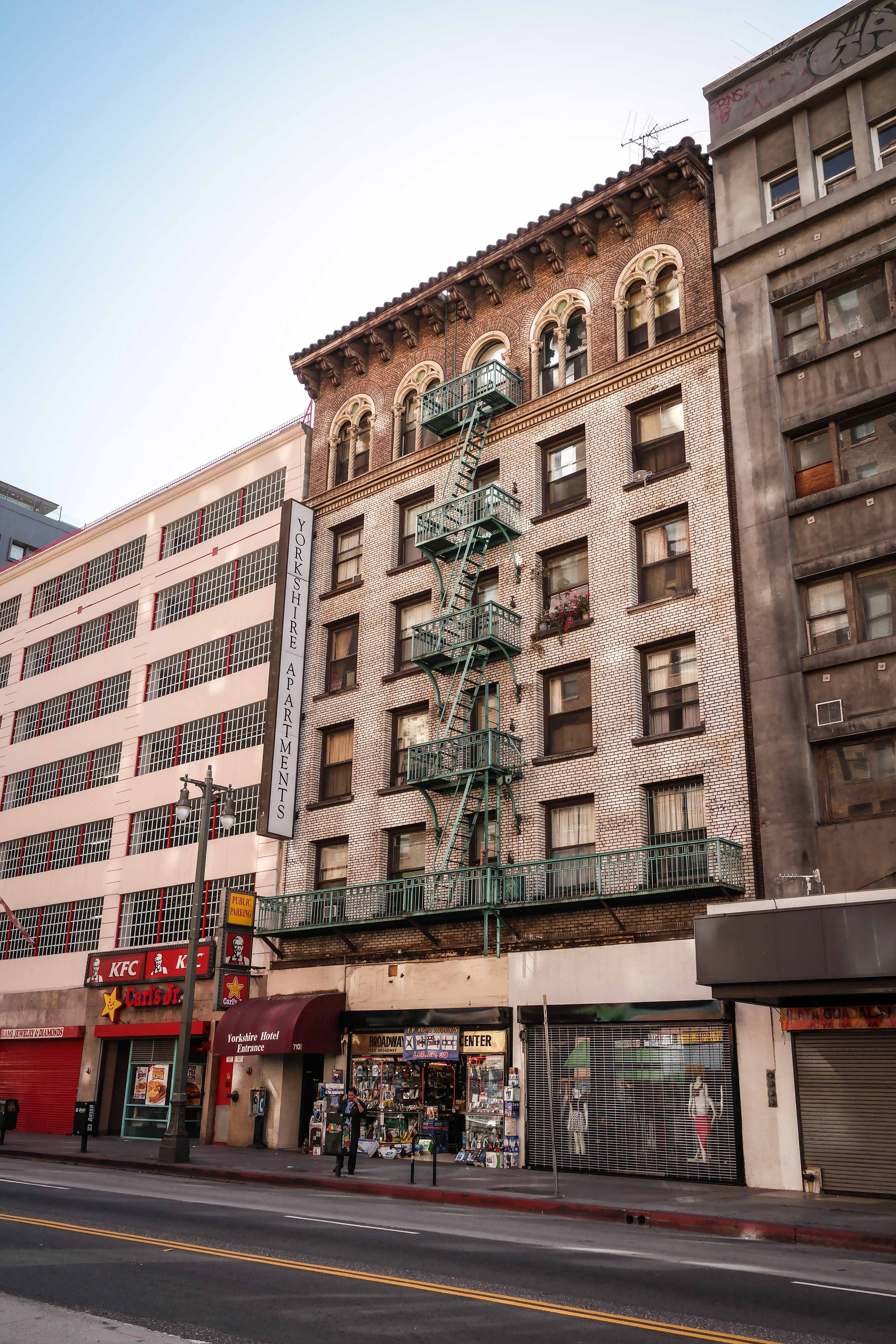
- The building in 2014

- Location within the Los Angeles metropolitan area
- Location: 710-714 S. Broadway, Los Angeles, California
- Coordinates: 34°02′41″N 118°15′13″W
- Built: 1909
- Architect: Parkinson and Bergstrom
- Part of: Broadway Theater and Commercial District (ID79000484)
- Designated CP: May 9, 1979

Yorkshire Hotel, also known as Yorkshire Apartments and J. D. Hooker Building, is a historic six-story building located at 710-714 S. Broadway in the Broadway Theater District in the historic core of downtown Los Angeles.

== History ==
Yorkshire Hotel was designed by Parkinson and Bergstrom, the architectural duo responsible for many buildings on Broadway, including Bullock's Building, Trustee Building, Metropolitan Building, and Broadway Mart Center. Completed in 1909, the building was originally a hotel and cafeteria, and was converted to housing and retail in 1972.

In 1979, the Broadway Theater and Commercial District was added to the National Register of Historic Places, with Yorkshire Hotel listed as a contributing property in the district.

== Architecture and design ==
Yorkshire Hotel is made of steel reinforced brick and concrete and has a pressed brick, terra cotta, tile, and ornamental iron facade. The building features cornice and arched windows.

== See also ==
- List of contributing properties in the Broadway Theater and Commercial District
