= Trustee Building =

Historic building in downtown Los Angeles

- U.S. Historic district – Contributing property
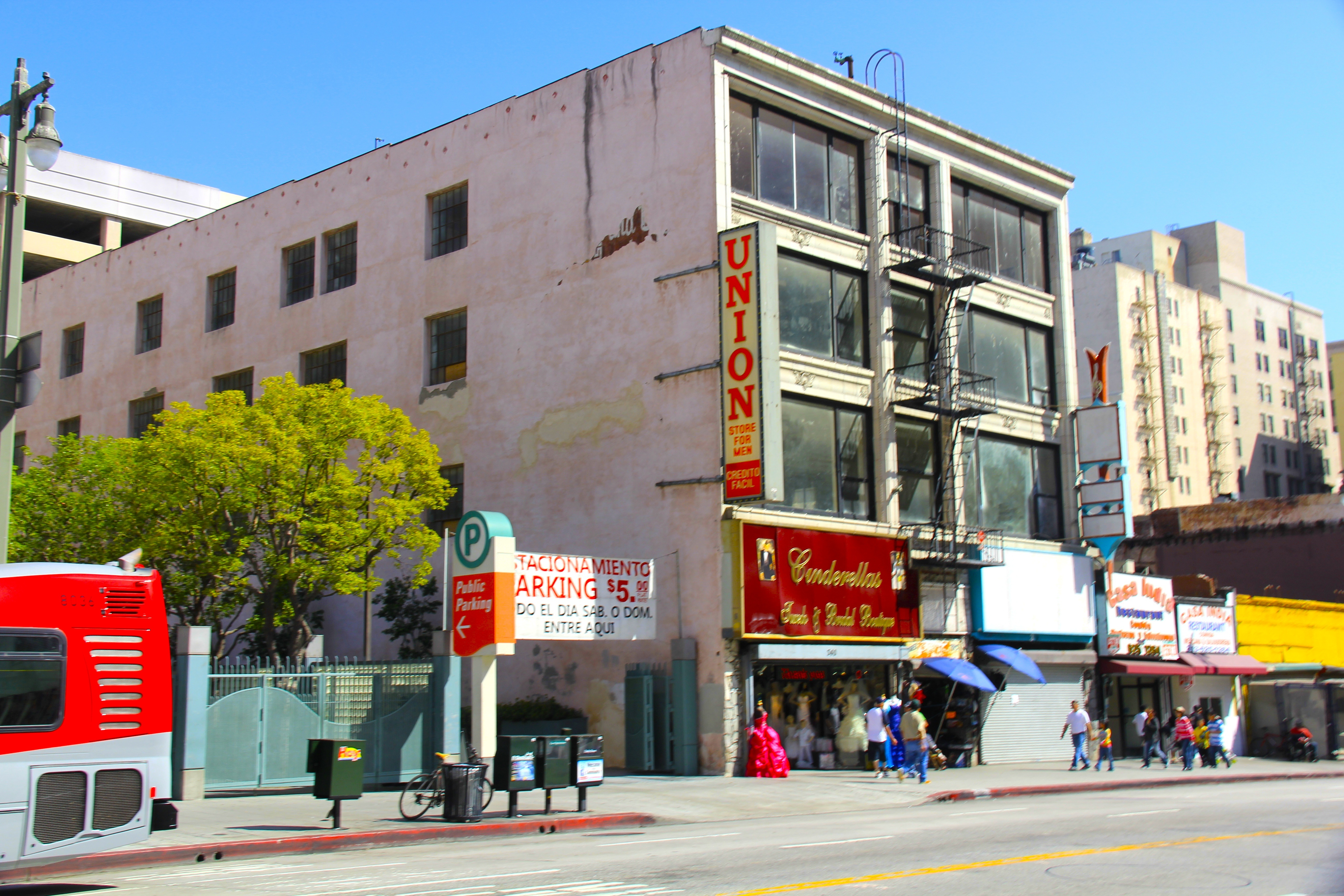
- The building in 2012

- Location within the Los Angeles metropolitan area
- Location: 340 S. Broadway, Los Angeles, California
- Coordinates: 34°03′00″N 118°14′55″W
- Built: 1905
- Architect: Parkinson and Bergstrom
- Part of: Broadway Theater and Commercial District (ID79000484)
- Designated CP: May 9, 1979

Trustee Building is a historic four story building located at 340 S. Broadway in the Broadway Theater District in the historic core of downtown Los Angeles.

== History ==
Trustee Building was designed by Parkinson and Bergstrom, the duo responsible for many buildings on Broadway, including Bullock's Building, Yorkshire Hotel, Metropolitan Building, and Broadway Mart Center. It was built in 1905 and originally housed financial institutions.

On November 6, 1939, the Trustee Building's northern-adjacent neighbor caught fire, with the Los Angeles Fire Department using the Trustee Building to help respond. Trustee Building was saved, but its neighbor was not.

In 1979, the Broadway Theater and Commercial District was added to the National Register of Historic Places, with Trustee Building listed as a contributing property in the district.

== Architecture and design ==
Trustee Building is made of brick and concrete on a steel frame with a tiled facade.

== See also ==
- List of contributing properties in the Broadway Theater and Commercial District
