= Metropolitan Building (Los Angeles) =

- U.S. Historic district – Contributing property
- Los Angeles Historic-Cultural Monument
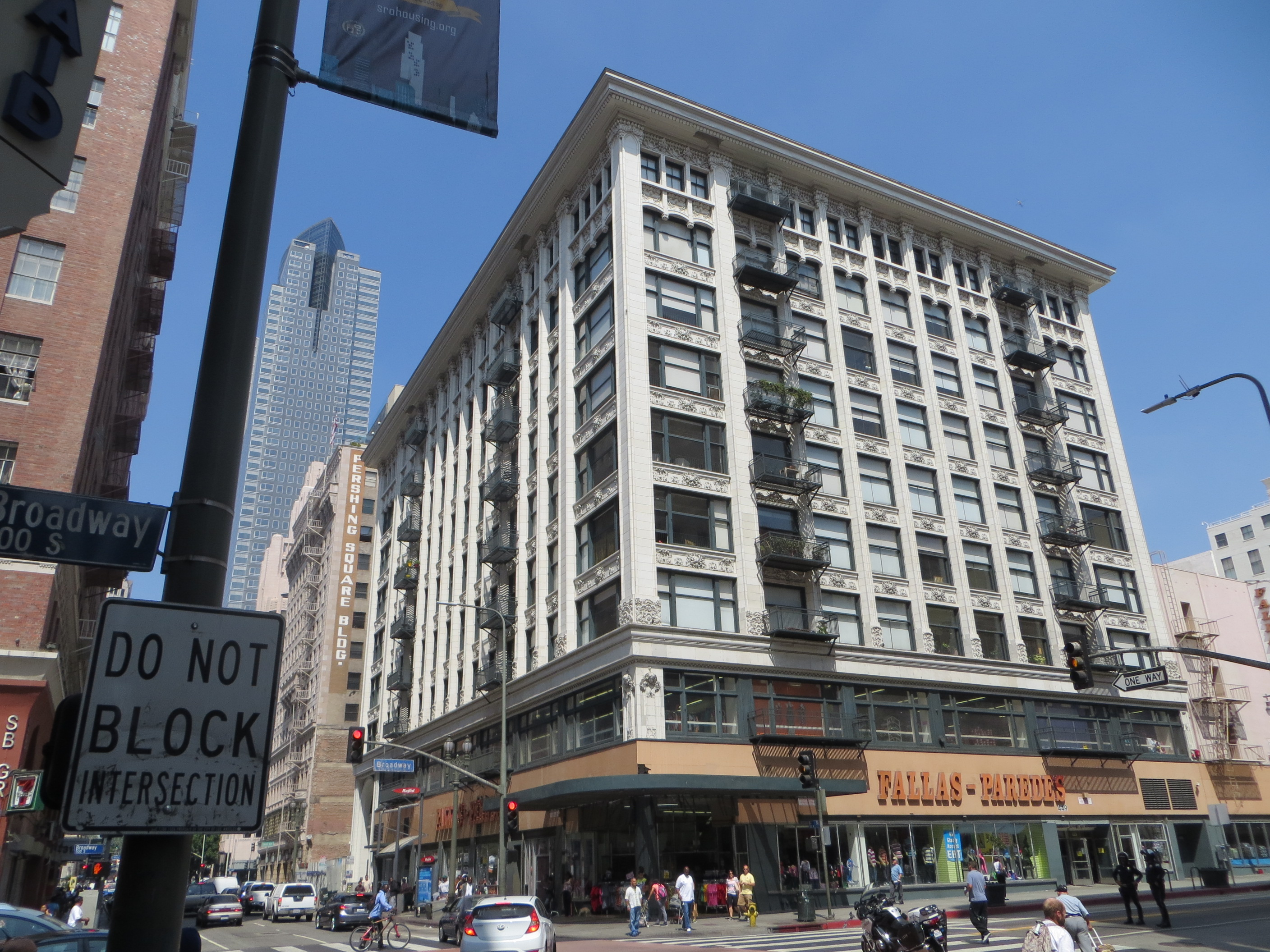
- The building in 2014

- Location within the Los Angeles metropolitan area
- Location: 315 W. 5th Street; Los Angeles, California; United States
- Coordinates: 34°02′55″N 118°15′03″W
- Built: 1913
- Architect: John Parkinson; George Edwin Bergstrom
- Architectural style: Beaux Arts
- Part of: Broadway Theater and Commercial District (ID79000484)
- LAHCM No.: 1019

Significant dates
- Designated CP: May 9, 1979
- Designated LAHCM: April 27, 2012

The Metropolitan Building, in Los Angeles, California, was completed in 1913 and is one of a number of buildings built along Broadway in the early decades of the twentieth century for commercial and retail uses in what had then become the busiest and largest shopping district of the city. Located at the intersection of W. 5th Street and S. Broadway, the Metropolitan Building replaced a two-story, Romanesque Revival style building with storefronts on S. Broadway and W. 5th Street. This building was called the Mueller Building for its owner, Michail Mueller.

Michail Mueller's will was probated in Los Angeles on July 7, 1894. In this document, Mueller left the subject property, with its existing building, to his daughter-in-law, Nettie Mueller, his granddaughter, Clara E. Mueller, and his two grandsons, Charles C. Mueller and Earl Mueller. According to the chain of title for the subject property, the Muellers and their descendants would retain ownership until the mid-1980s.

In May 1913, the Metropolitan Fireproof Building Company was granted a City of Los Angeles building permit for the subject property to "remove present buildings for the purpose of erecting a new building". On the permit, the architects for the project are identified as Parkinson and Bergstrom, while the contractor is listed as F. O. Engstrom. The purpose of the new building was for stores and offices. Although the members of the company listed on the permit are not known, it is assumed that they consisted of the four Mueller relatives identified above. In June 1913, the Metropolitan Fireproof Building Co, was granted a permit to "erect the foundation of a building to cover the entire lot ... building will be 10 stories".

The Metropolitan Building contributes to the significance of the historic district under criterion C, possessing high artistic value for its use of the Beaux Arts style in a district that contains some of the “best examples of commercial ... architecture in Southern California". The building is also significant for its association with noted, local architects, John Parkinson (1861–1945) and Edwin Bergstrom (1876–1955), who were in professional partnership together from 1905 to 1915.

== Architects ==
=== John Parkinson ===
John Parkinson, one of the most important architects practicing in Los Angeles during the early twentieth century, opened his first architectural practice in the city in 1894. By 1896, he had designed the city's first Class "A" fireproof, steel-frame building, the Homer Laughlin Building. His design for the 14-story Braly Block/Continental Building (1904) was the first skyscraper built in Los Angeles. It was the tallest building in downtown until completion of Los Angeles City Hall (with John C. Austin and A.C. Martin) in 1928. After Edwin Bergstrom left the partnership in 1915, Parkinson practiced on his own for several years. In 1920, Parkinson was joined in practice by his son, Donald B. Parkinson (1895–1945). The firm of Parkinson & Parkinson, Architects, is credited with having "designed many of Los Angeles' finest buildings, which became some of the city's most enduring landmarks". Among their best-known works: the original campus of the University of Southern California (1919–39), Los Angeles Memorial Coliseum (1923 and 1931), Los Angeles City Hall (1928, with Albert C, Martin and John C. Austin), Bullocks Wilshire (1929) and Union Station (1939). Along with earlier Parkinson projects, these buildings helped to define the distinctive urban landscape of Los Angeles and southern California. In The City That John Built, John Parkinson's design talent is described: "... a Parkinson building is substantial, and what elevated him from being a mere copier was his remarkable ability to adapt a style to a new function and in so doing create something that was uniquely American".

=== Edwin Bergstrom ===
Edwin Bergstrom studied architecture at the Massachusetts Institute of Technology and at Yale University. He began his architectural practice in New York City in 1899 and then moved to Los Angeles in 1903. He partnered with John Parkinson soon after arriving in Los Angeles. After leaving the partnership with Parkinson, Bergstrom oversaw a successful solo practice. In the 1920s and 1930s, Bergstrom was associated with the Pasadena architectural firm of Bennett and Haskell. He won a design competition in 1923 to design the City of Pasadena Civic Auditorium, which anchors the south end of the city's civic center. In the late 1920s, Bergstrom was one of five prominent Los Angeles architects, organized as the Allied Architects of Los Angeles, involved in designing the Los Angeles County/USC Medical Center General Hospital (1933), an architectural monument in East Los Angeles. Bergstrom was commissioned as the chief consulting architect for the United States War Department in 1941. In this capacity, he served as the chief architect for the Pentagon in Washington, D.C. (1941–43). Bergstrom was also actively involved in the American Institute of Architects (AIA), serving as the national organization's treasurer for over 40 years and as president in 1939 and 1940. During their partnership, Parkinson & Bergstrom became the dominant architectural firm hired to design major buildings in Los Angeles. This prominent partnership designed over 25 buildings in the 10 years of their collaboration, with the majority located in the city's burgeoning downtown. Besides the Metropolitan Building, there are four other Parkinson & Bergstrom buildings located within the boundaries of the Broadway Commercial and Entertainment Historic District: Trustee Building, Yorkshire Hotel, Bullock's Building, and Broadway Mart Center. As is evidenced in the Metropolitan Building, Parkinson & Bergstrom commercial buildings typically reflect influences of the Beaux Arts or Classical Revival styles popular at the turn of the century with exterior use of glazed terra cotta, decorative spandrel panels, low relief sculptural ornamentation, and large projecting cornices.

As designed by Parkinson & Bergstrom, the Metropolitan Building was a dignified building with handsomely appointed public spaces and multiple retail storefronts. Despite exterior alterations to the storefronts and main entrance, the building retains sufficient integrity of design, material and workmanship, to maintain significance under criterion C.

== Description and history ==
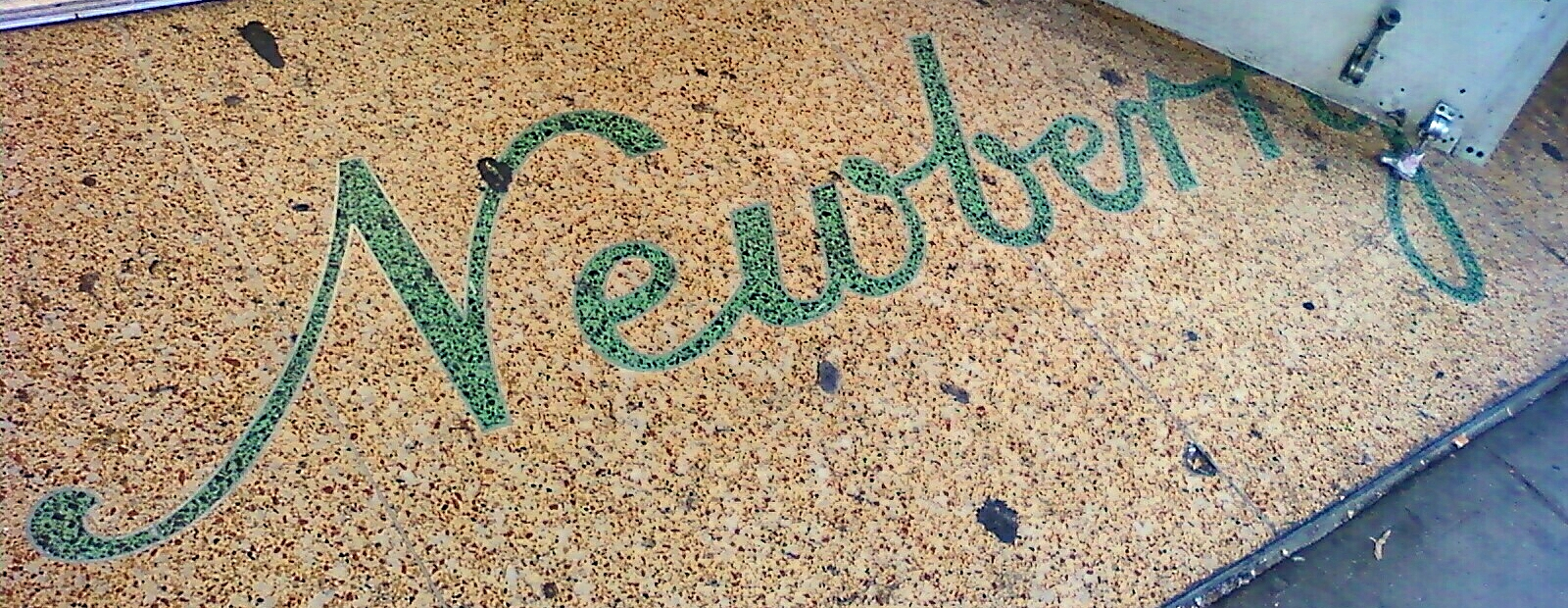
The terrazzo floor bearing the five and dime J. J. Newberry company name marks the site of the store's former location on the ground level of the Metropolitan Building.

The Metropolitan Building also contributes to the significance of the historic district under criterion A for its association with commercial and retail development that occurred on Broadway between 1890 and 1930. With this development, Broadway became the "commercial center of the Southland", a title it retained until well after World War II. Like many of its neighbors, the Metropolitan Building was built to provide street-level retail storefronts for multiple businesses with the upper levels left as simple, open lofts to allow maximum flexibility for prospective tenants as well as space for storage or warehousing. The main entrance and elevator lobby serving the upper floors was elegantly professional with marble floors and walls and decorative elevator doors (these finishes are noted in original building plans). On the upper levels, the elevator lobby and corridors had simpler decorative treatments. The overall design of the building provided prospective tenants with well-appointed, but understated, and flexible, office space in an ideal location within the center of the booming downtown. Historic photographs and Los Angeles City Directories indicate that tenants within the building included (dates of tenancy are in parentheses); The Owl Drug Co., a San Francisco-based drug store chain (1914–1934), Los Angeles Public Library (1913–1926), Foreman & Clark, a budget-oriented men's clothier (c. 1915–1928), Janss Investment Co., a prominent real estate development company (1916–1928), J. J. Newberry Co., a Southern California-based variety store chain (1939 to mid-1990s), and Fallas-Paredes, a Los Angeles-based discount clothing chain (1996–2022). Additional tenants have included dental and medical offices, jewelers, and a street-level cafe.

On the ground level, long, narrow storefronts were constructed with the most prominent, and largest, at the southwest corner of the building. This space appears to have only had three tenants over the course of the building's history. These retail tenants have been The Owl Drug Company, J. J. Newberry Co., C. H. Baker and Fallas Paredes. These retail tenants also appear to have leased office or storage space in the upper floors of the building. In the early years, the most prominent tenant was the Los Angeles Public Library, which occupied the seventh through tenth floors. To entice the Library to relocate to the building, the Metropolitan Building Co., and its architects, Parkinson & Bergstrom, submitted a proposal to the Library Board in 1913. In this initial proposal, the architectural plans showed a "complete ninth floor, no skylights in the roof, and no tenth floor".

After several months of negotiation, changes to the plans were made, which included:

Detail from Sanborn Fire Insurance Map, 1906.

removal of the central part of the ninth floor, and skylights supplied in the roof so that a flood of natural light could be shed over the circulation department and book shelves on the eighth floor. To take the place of the space thus lost on the ninth floor, an additional story (the tenth) was added on the north side of the skylights, to accommodate the bindery, the carpenter shop and the small lecture hall–training class room.

Floor plans for the eighth and ninth floors, depicting the changes noted, were printed in the Library's monthly bulletin, "Library Books" in 1914.

Shortly after moving into its new quarters, an article praising the new Library was published in the Los Angeles Times. The article notes that in moving to the Metropolitan Building, the Library enjoyed the following benefits:

A location at one of the city's busiest and most central street corners ... providing more shelving and reading space ... additional space allows for books to be arranged in open shelving and for the creation of three new departments (Industrial, Sociology, and Art and Music) ... an abundance of natural light and ventilation.

Several photographs depicting the well-appointed spaces of the new library accompanied the article. On the exterior, a bladesign reading, "PUBLIC LIBRARY," was erected on the upper stories of the southwest comer of the building. The Library continued to occupy its space within the Metropolitan Building until 1926 when it moved to its permanent building at 630 W. 5th Street. After the Library vacated the building, the seventh floor was subdivided to accommodate new tenants, the stairs between the eighth and ninth floors were removed, and the opening between floors was infilled.

In 1939, Newberry's entered into a lease with the Metropolitan Building Co. for that "certain portion of the ground floor of [the] Metropolitan Building (new sales space) being the portion of the ground floor that adjoins the building lobby ... extending the full depth of the ground floor" as well as the "basement ... being [the] portion of the floor approximately equivalent in space to and lies below the above described ground floor premises". With this description it appears that the multiple retail spaces originally installed in the ground level (such as Newberry's and the C. H. Baker shoe store) had been combined to form one, large Newberry's store in 1939.

Although specific building permit records have not been located, it appears that during its approximately 50 year tenancy, Newberry's installed various improvements/alterations with significant alterations that appear to be circa 1950 and circa 1990. The circa 1950 alterations include the installation of terrazzo flooring, installation of corner entrance and exterior canopy, and installation of the structural glass spandrel panel. A number of these alterations are visible in photographs from the 1960s and 1970s. These photographs also indicate that the neighboring building at 445 S. Broadway was also part of the Newberry's store. In a 1952 building permit, the owners of 445 S. Broadway were granted permission to "construct ramp and steps into Metropolitan building". This record may mark the date that the neighboring building were connected although the openings are also depicted in the circa 1950 Sanborn map noted previously. The circa 1990 alterations may include the addition of the food court space and the opening between the first and second floors.

While building permit information indicates that Newberry's retained its lease until the mid-1990s l; it is not clear whether the upper stories retained their tenancy. The economic downturn in downtown Los Angeles, as retailers and commercial interests shifted their assets to the booming suburbs, caused many vacancies throughout the 1970s through early 1990s. How the Metropolitan Building fared during this period is not known, however, in 1995, a building permit notes that the building is "only occupied on the ground floors".

In 1985, the last remaining ownership interest in the building held by a Mueller family member was sold. In 1996, the building was transferred to the current owner. At around the same time, the ground floor retail space previously occupied by Newberry's was taken by Fallas Paredes clothing store, an affiliate of the property owner. After being used as storage for the store, the upper levels have since been converted to loft apartments.

The Metropolitan Building has had several prominent commercial and retail tenants in its approximately 100-year history. Although the number and type of these tenants have changed over the years, they have reflected the economic and retail forces that have shaped downtown Los Angeles in the twentieth century. Despite these changes, the Metropolitan Building retains its original use and continues to contribute to the commercial and retail needs of the surrounding neighborhood in a manner that documents the development of commercial growth in downtown Los Angeles.

By 2026, the building was in danger of foreclosure after the owners, the Fallas family, defaulted on a loan. At the time, the building's retail space was vacant.

== In popular culture ==
The Metropolitan Building was featured in the Dragnet episode, “The Big Jade Story,” originally broadcast on March 23, 1967.

== See also ==
- List of Los Angeles Historic-Cultural Monuments in Downtown Los Angeles
- List of contributing properties in the Broadway Theater and Commercial District
