= Broadway Mart Center =

Building in Los Angeles, California

- U.S. Historic district – Contributing property
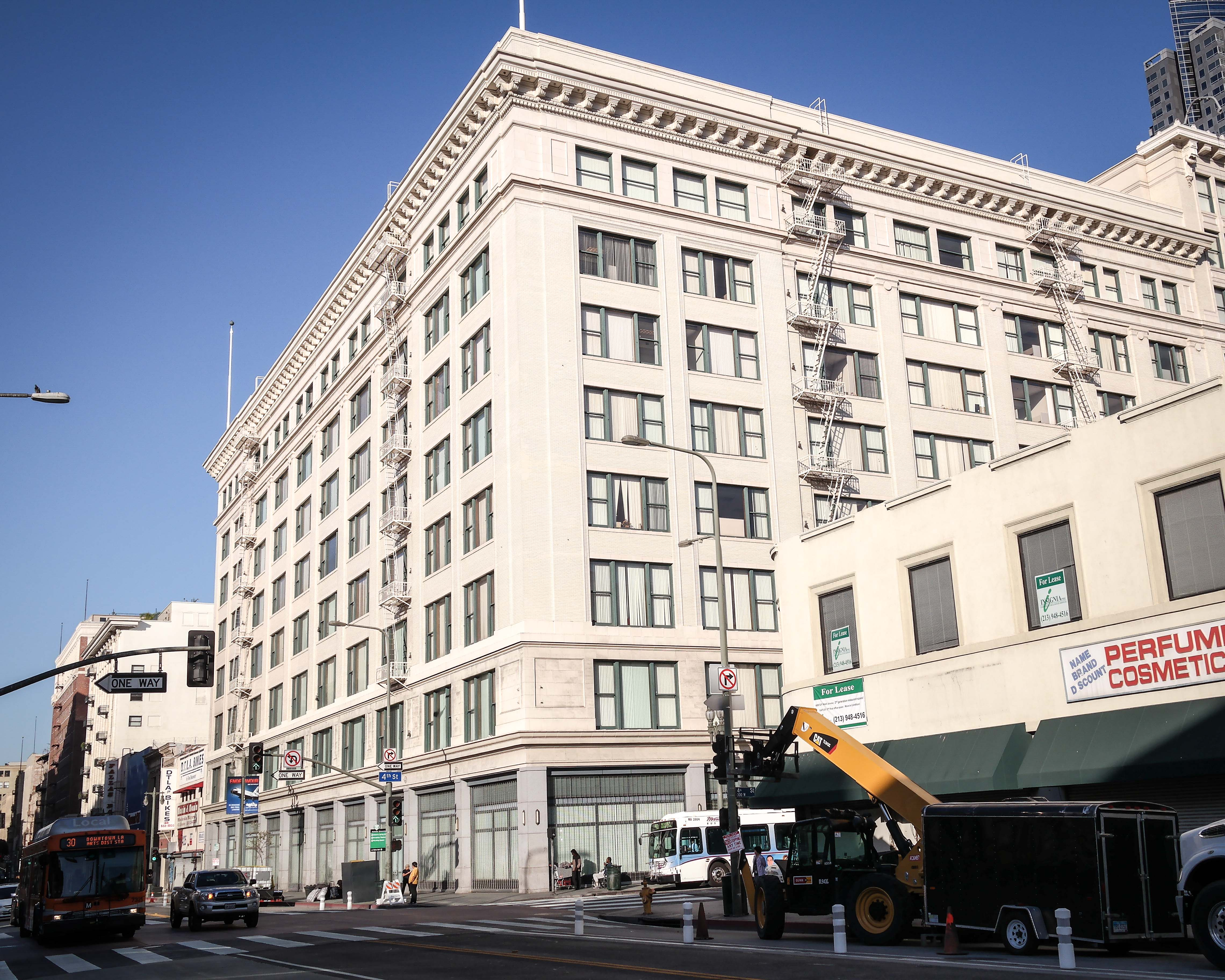
- The building in 2014

- Location within the Los Angeles metropolitan area
- Location: 401-423 S. Broadway and 501 W. 4th Street, Los Angeles, California
- Coordinates: 34°02′59″N 118°14′59″W
- Built: 1913-1915
- Architect: Parkinson and Bergstrom
- Architectural style: Beaux Arts with Italian Renaissance Revival ornamentation
- Part of: Broadway Theater and Commercial District (ID79000484)
- Designated CP: May 9, 1979

Broadway Mart Center, also known as Broadway Department Store, Junipero Serra Building, and Junipero Serra State Office Building, is a historic ten-story highrise located at 401-423 S. Broadway and 501 W. 4th Street in the Broadway Theater District in the historic core of downtown Los Angeles. It is best known for its almost sixty years as the flagship location of The Broadway.

== History ==
=== Precursor ===
Prior to Broadway Mart Center, the SW corner of Broadway and 4th Street was the site of the three-story Hallett & Pirtle Building, designed by Frederick Rice Dorn and built in 1895. The following year, Arthur Letts bought The Broadway, located in one of the building's storefronts. By 1904, The Broadway occupied the entire ground floor, and in 1905, it acquired the upper floors as well.

=== Broadway Mart Center ===
In 1912, The Broadway announced plans for a new nine-story building to replace the Hallett & Pirtle Building. This building, the Broadway Mart Center, was designed by Parkinson and Bergstrom, the architectural duo responsible for several buildings on Broadway, including Trustee Building, Yorkshire Hotel, Bullock's Building, and Metropolitan Building, and was built in 1913-1915. The company claimed they "ransacked the earth for merchandise" to fill their new building, which when completed contained five entrances (three on Broadway, one on Fourth Street, and one on Hill Street), eleven passenger and four freight elevators, and 460,000 square feet (43,000 m^{2}) of space.

Broadway Mart Center's first phase of construction involved acquiring 71,000 square feet (6,600 m^{2}) of space in the Clark Hotel, which backed up to The Broadway. Then, the departments in Hallett & Pirtle Building's southern half were transferred here.

For the second phase of construction, Hallett & Pirtle Building's now-empty southern half was demolished, then the southern half of the Broadway Mart Center was built in its place. This half, which measured 96,600 square feet (8,970 m^{2}), opened on August 10, 1914 and carried the departments previously located the northern half of the original store.

For the third and final stage of construction, the northern half of the Hallett & Pirtle Building was demolished, then the northern half of the Broadway Mart Center was built in its place. This half opened on June 25, 1915, although its formal inauguration occurred September 16, 1915, during Fashion Week.

The Broadway occupied the Broadway Mart Center in its entirety from its construction to November 1973.

=== Vacancy ===
After The Broadway vacated Broadway Mart Center in 1973, the building was extensively vandalized and damaged by unsuccessful remodel attempts. Despite this, when the Broadway Theater and Commercial District was added to the National Register of Historic Places in 1979, Broadway Mart Center listed as a contributing property in the district.

In 1984, the building was bought by developer Roger Luby, whose renovation plans fell apart after his partners defaulted during the savings and loan crisis. The renovation, budgeted at $56 million ($174 million in 2025), was half complete when it defaulted in September 1986.

=== Junipero Serra Building ===
The State of California bought the building in 1995 and reopened it four years later as the Junipero Serra Building, the lowest-cost state office building in California in the previous thirty years. The State received a Conservancy Preservation Award in 2000 for their work on this building. In 2009, the state looked into selling this and sixteen other buildings to bridge a $21 billion ($31.5 billion in 2025) deficit. If sold, this building would have been leased back to the state for twenty years.

As of 2020, this building is one of 56 managed by the California Department of General Services and one of two (the other being the Ronald Reagan State Building) located in Los Angeles.

== Architecture and design ==
Broadway Mart Center is made of steel, brick, and hollow tile with reinforced concrete floors and a brick and terra cotta facade. The building features a Beaux Arts design with Italian Renaissance Revival ornamentation that include pressed metal cornice with dentils, and egg-and-dart molding, carved modillions and a fillet band at the top.

== See also ==
- List of contributing properties in the Broadway Theater and Commercial District
