= The Last Bookstore =

Bookstore in Los Angeles, California, U.S.

Coordinates: 34°02′52″N 118°14′59″W

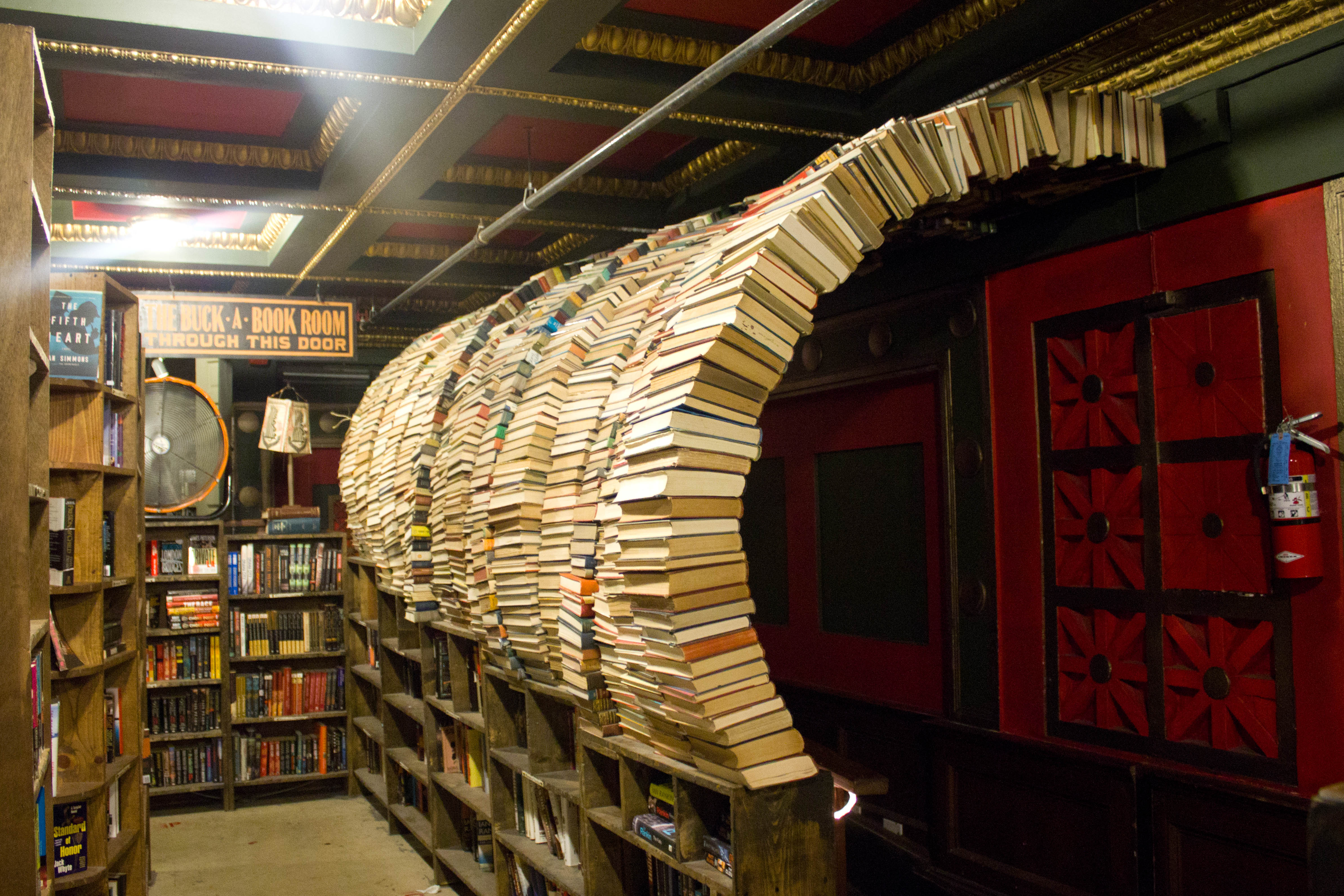
- Industry: Specialty retail
- Founded: 2005
- Founder: Josh Spencer
- Headquarters: Los Angeles, United States
- Number of locations: 3
- Area served: Los Angeles metropolitan area
- Products: New, used and rare books
- Owner: Josh Spencer
- Number of employees: 50+
- Website: lastbookstorela.com

The Last Bookstore is an independent bookstore located at 453 S Spring Street, Downtown Los Angeles. Conde Nast Traveler called it California's largest new and used bookstore.

== History ==
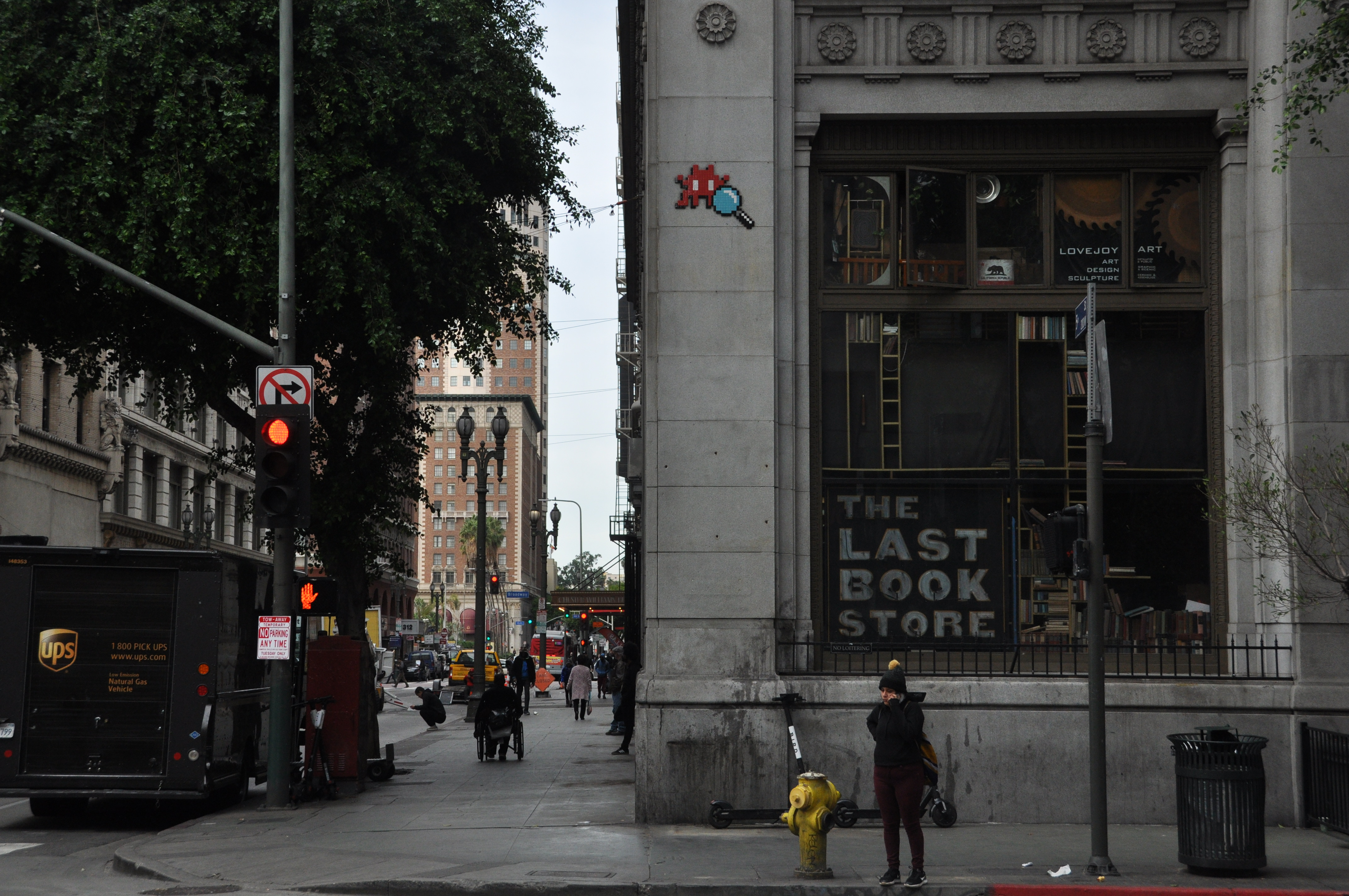
Shop exterior, 2019

The store was founded in 2005 by Josh Spencer, the first incarnation being inside a Downtown Los Angeles loft. While here, the store sold books and other items online. In December 2009, Spencer opened a bookstore at 4th and Main Street. The bookstore moved to its current 22,000 square feet (2,000 m^{2}) location in the Spring Arts Tower at 5th and Spring Street on June 3, 2011. The current store, a former bank, contains two floors (including the former vault) and also creates visual merchandising through creative displays and book sculptures.

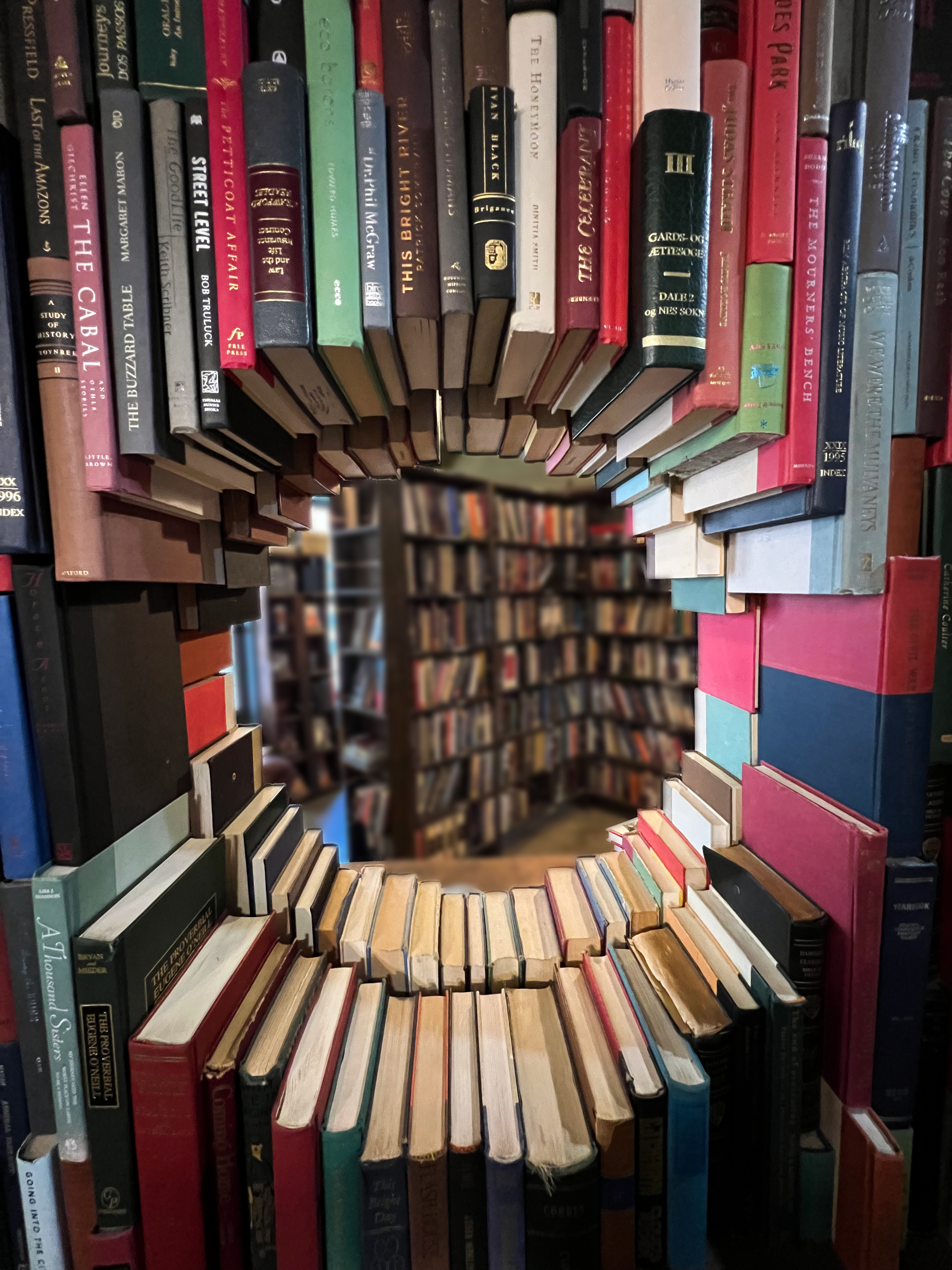
The book window, one of several book sculptures on display

In 2021, the bookstore installed a plant wall to the famous book tunnel. The store also features a restaurant: Yuko Kitchen.

=== Other locations ===
In December 2024, The Last Bookstore opened a second 10,000 square feet (930 m^{2}) location in Studio City. The Last Bookstore's owners also own a "sister" location in Montrose, California.

== Media ==
Filmmaker Chad Howitt chronicled The Last Bookstore and its owner, Spencer, in a short documentary titled Welcome to the Last Bookstore, released in 2016. The bookstore also appeared in Gone Girl and Under the Silver Lake, and it was featured in Crime Scene: The Vanishing at the Cecil Hotel.
