= Security Building (Los Angeles) =

Building in California, United States

- U.S. Historic district – Contributing property
- Los Angeles Historic-Cultural Monument
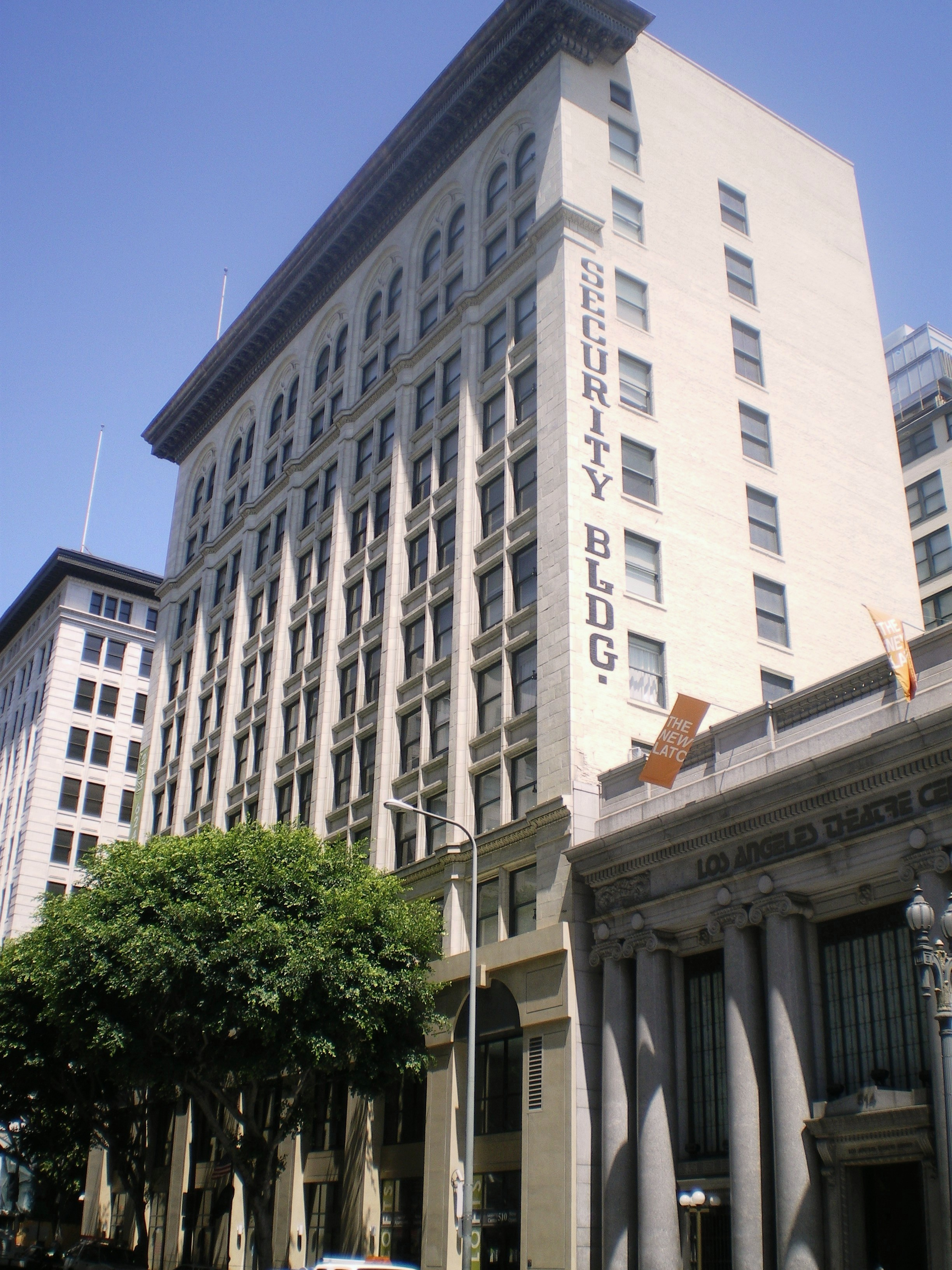
- The building in 2008

- Location within the Los Angeles metropolitan area
- Location: 510 South Spring Street; Los Angeles, California
- Coordinates: 34.0469°N 118.2497°W
- Built: 1906
- Architects: Parkinson and Bergstrom
- Architectural style: Beaus Arts
- Part of: Spring Street Financial District (ID79000489)
- LAHCM No.: 741

Significant dates
- Designated CP: August 10, 1979
- Designated LAHCM: February 4, 2003

Security Building, also known as Security Trust and Savings Building and later known as Lofts at the Security Building, is an eleven story high-rise located at 510 South Spring Street in downtown Los Angeles, California. It is a Los Angeles Historic Cultural Monument and a contributing property in the National Register of Historic Places-listed Spring Street Financial District.

== History ==
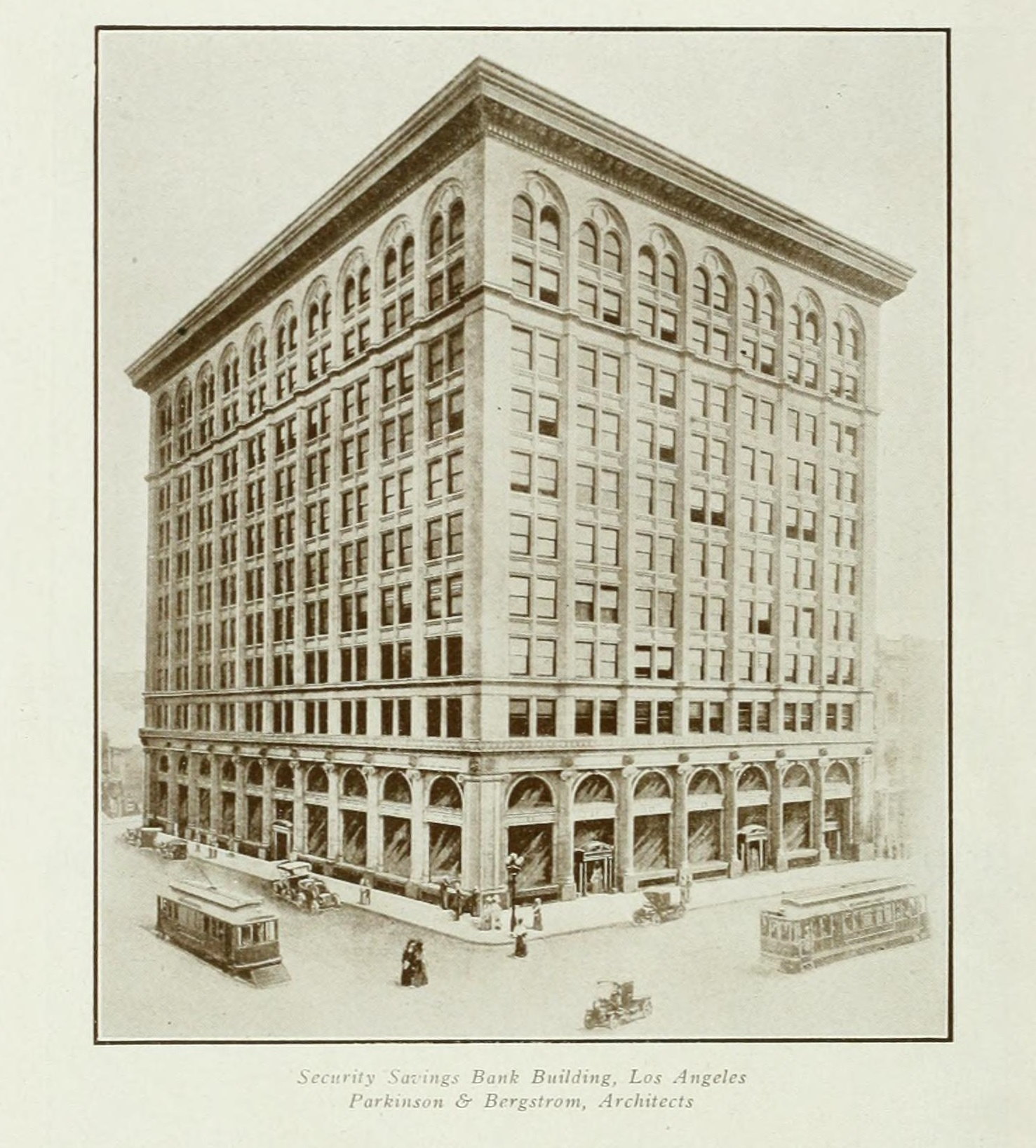
The building in 1910

Security Building was designed by Parkinson and Bergstrom and built in 1906. Security Savings Bank moved into the building in 1907.

Security Building was the tallest building in Los Angeles for four years.

In 1979, the Spring Street Financial District was added to the National Register of Historic Places, with Security Building listed as a contributing property in the district. The building was declared Los Angeles Historic Cultural Monument No. 741 on February 4, 2003.

In 2006, the building was converted to residential and renamed Lofts at the Security Building. The cost of the conversion was $28 million ($44.7 million in 2025).

== Architecture and design ==
Security Building is 165 feet (50 m) tall, eleven stories, and was built with a steel frame and a Beaux Arts design. The building's facade contains glazed tile and brick, the first floor facade also contains arched windows and faux columns, and the building also features pronounced cornice.

== See also ==
- List of contributing properties in the Spring Street Financial District
- List of Los Angeles Historic-Cultural Monuments in Downtown Los Angeles
- National Register of Historic Places listings in Los Angeles, California
