= Rowan Building =

Building in Los Angeles, California

- U.S. Historic district – Contributing property
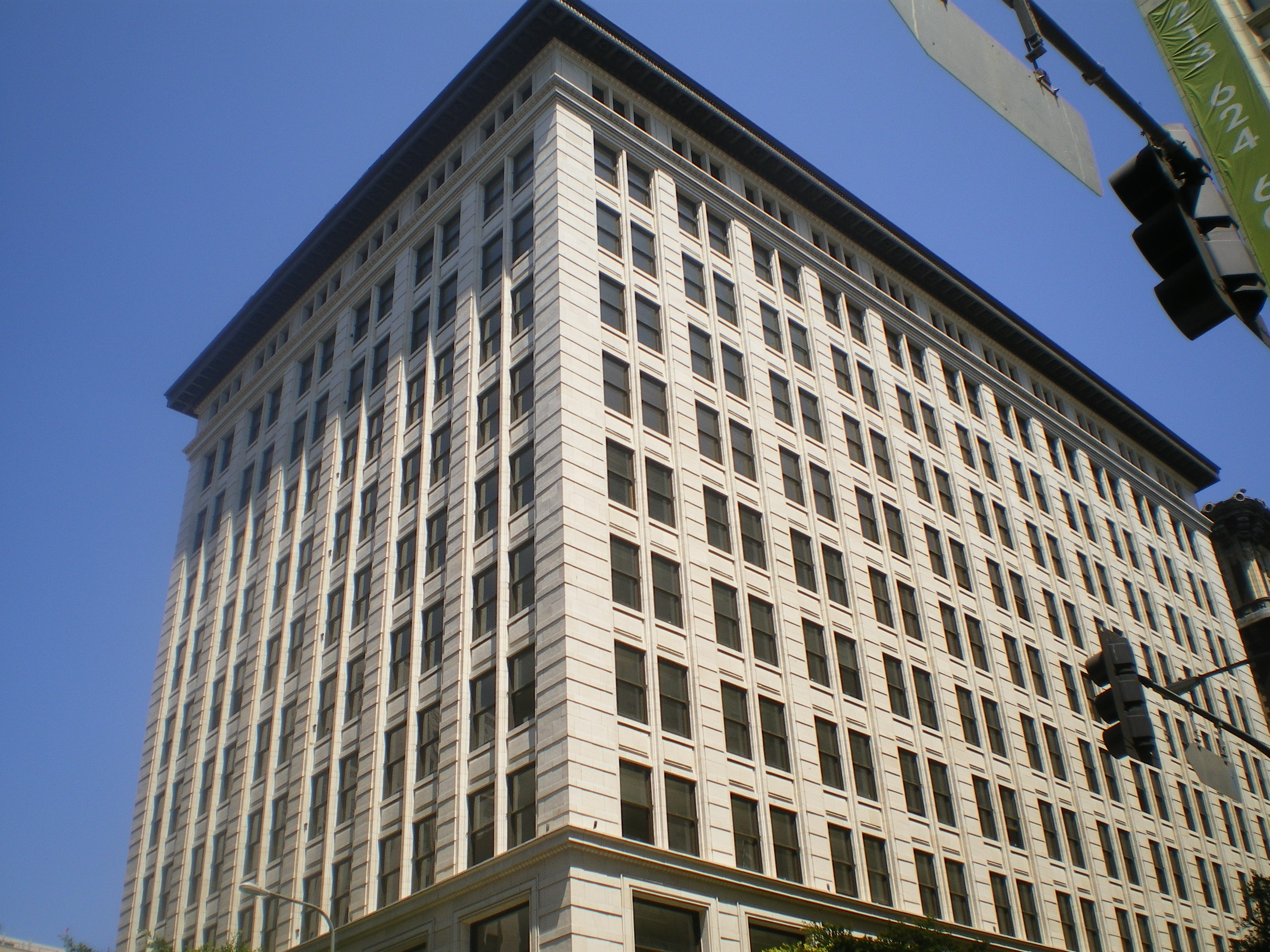
- The building in 2008

- Location within the Los Angeles metropolitan area
- Location: 460 S. Spring Street and 131 W. 5th Street, Los Angeles, California
- Coordinates: 34.0472°N 118.2490°W
- Built: 1910
- Architects: Parkinson and Bergstrom
- Architectural style: Commercial Style/Beaux Arts
- Part of: Spring Street Financial District (ID79000489)
- Designated CP: August 10, 1979

Rowan Building, also known as Title Insurance Building and Rowan Building Lofts, is a historic building located at 460 S. Spring Street and 131 W. 5th Street in downtown Los Angeles, California. It is a contributing property in the National Register of Historic Places-listed Spring Street Financial District.

== History ==
Rowan Building was designed by Parkinson and Bergstrom for Robert Rowan and built in 1910. Upon completion, it was the largest office building in Los Angeles.

Rowan Building's occupancy began to drop in the 1970s. In 1979, the Spring Street Financial District was added to the National Register of Historic Places, with Rowan Building listed as a contributing property in the district.

Developer Tom Gilmore bought Rowan Building in 2000 and Downtown Properties bought it in 2004. The building was converted to residential between 2006 and 2008 at a cost of $50 million ($77.6 million in 2025). It contains 206 units as well as ground floor storefronts.

== Architecture and design ==
Rowan Building is eleven stories and made with stone, brick, and 3,000 short tons (2,700,000 kg) of steel. The United States Department of the Interior describe the building as having a Commercial Style design, while others describe the design as Beaux Arts. The building features cornice, a stone and terra cotta facade, and contains more than 2000 windows.

Inside, the building contains a marble-clad lobby, hallways, and stairways. The elevator doors feature an Art Deco design with nickel and silver.

== See also ==
- List of contributing properties in the Spring Street Financial District
