= Spring Arts Tower =

Building in Los Angeles, California

- U.S. Historic district – Contributing property
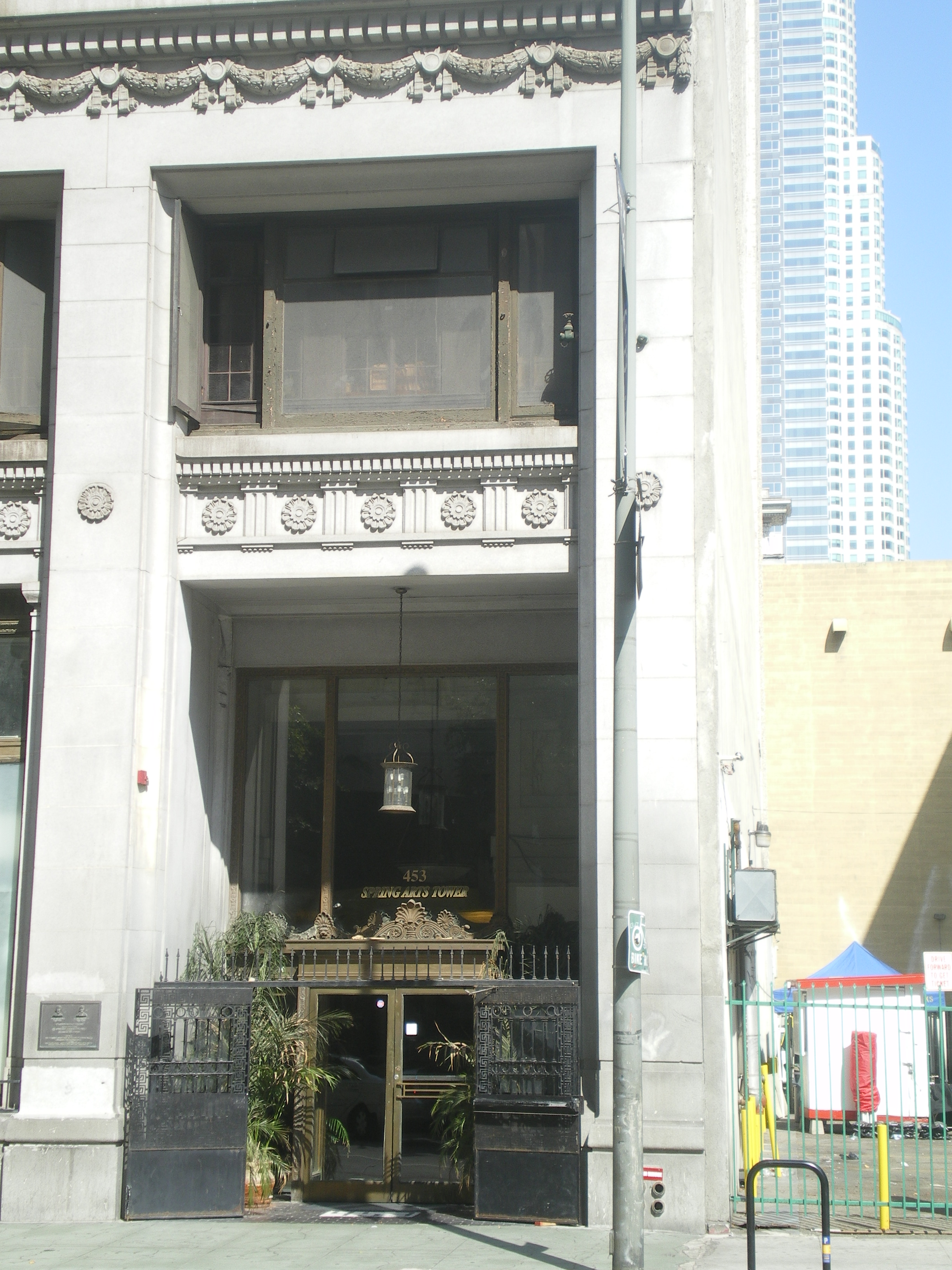
- Building entrance in 2008

- Location within the Los Angeles metropolitan area
- Location: 453 S. Spring Street, Los Angeles, California
- Coordinates: 34.0479°N 118.2495°W
- Built: 1914
- Architect: Parkinson and Bergstrom
- Part of: Spring Street Financial District (ID79000489)
- Designated CP: August 10, 1979

Spring Arts Tower, also known as Crocker Bank, Crocker Citizens National Bank Building, and Citizens National Bank Building, is a historic building located at 453 S. Spring Street in downtown Los Angeles, California. It is a contributing property in the Spring Street Financial District and is considered "at the heart of" Gallery Row.

== History ==
The building that became Spring Arts Tower was designed by Parkinson and Bergstrom and built in 1914. Crocker-Citizens National Bank moved into the building the following year.

In 1979, the Spring Street Financial District was added to the National Register of Historic Places, with Crocker Bank listed as a contributing property in the district.

A lounge opened in the building's basement in 2009. Two years later, The Last Bookstore moved into the building's bottom two floors. The building's upper floors have been converted to art studios, galleries, and other art-based small businesses; the building itself is considered "at the heart of" Gallery Row.

== Architecture and design ==
Crocker Bank Building is twelve stories and made of steel-reinforced concrete, brick, and terra cotta. The building originally had ornamental bands and cornice, but they have been removed. The building's first floor ornament remains, as does its early 1920s design.

The building's interior once featured a Doric architecture motif but it has been entirely remodeled. The lobby features white marble and the ground floor banking hall features an Art Nouveau design with floor-mosaics and 25-foot (7.6 m) pillars that connect to a vaulted ceiling. The bank area also features a Mosler vault.

== Filming location ==
Rush Hour, Rush Hour 2, and numerous commercials have shot at Spring Arts Tower.

== See also ==
- List of contributing properties in the Spring Street Financial District
