= George Bergstrom =

American architect (1876–1955)

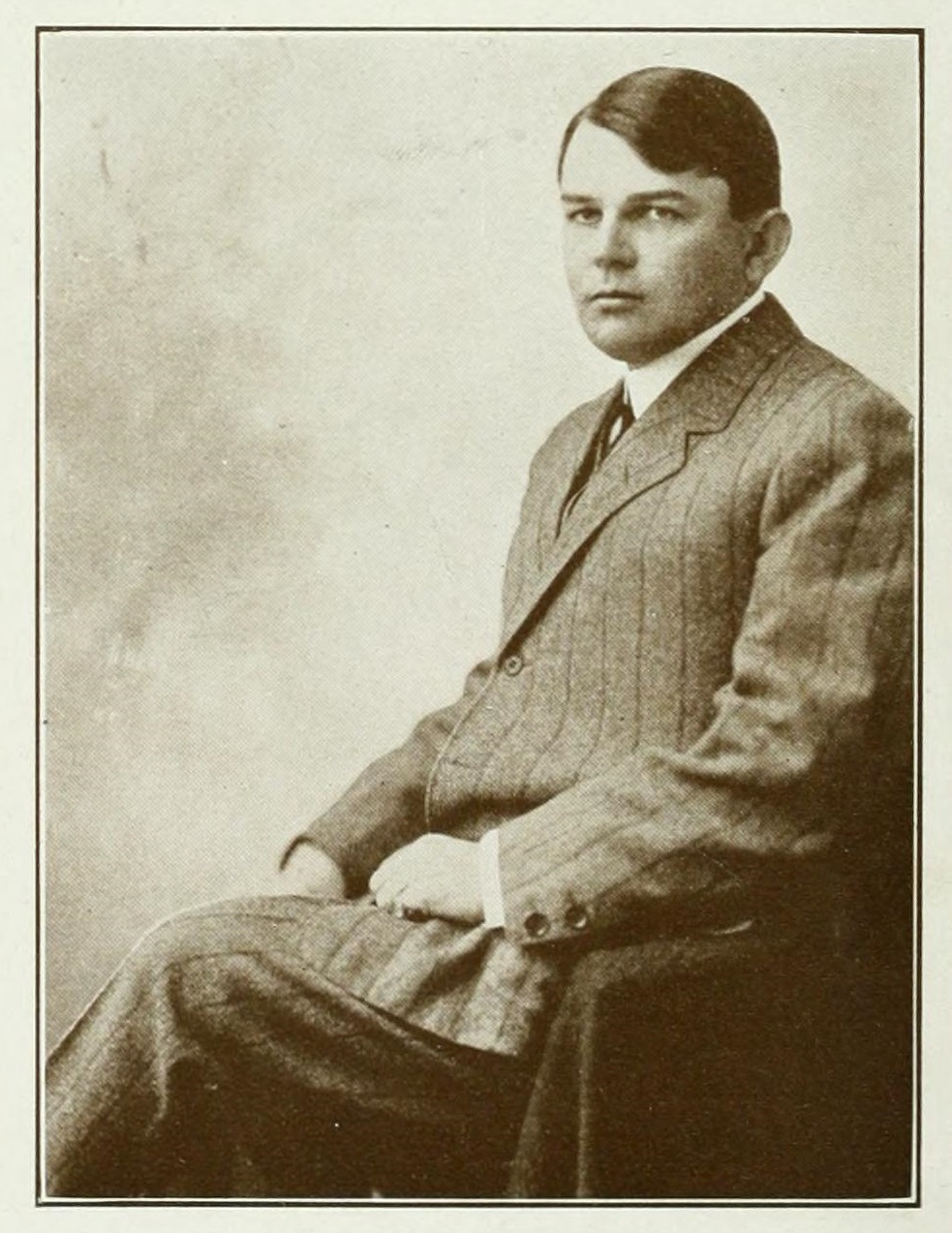
- George Edwin Bergstrom c. 1910
- Born: George Edwin Bergstrom; March 12, 1876; Neenah, Wisconsin, U.S.
- Died: June 17, 1955 (aged 79); Orange, California, U.S.
- Resting place: Forest Lawn Memorial Park
- Education: Massachusetts Institute of Technology
- Known for: Designing The Pentagon and various buildings in the Los Angeles County area
- Spouse: Nancy Evan Kimberly (m. 1903; died 1946)

George Edwin Bergstrom (March 12, 1876 – June 17, 1955) was an American architect who designed many buildings in Los Angeles, California. He also designed the Pentagon in Arlington County, Virginia. Many of his notable works were done while he was a partner with John Parkinson.

== Biography ==
George Edwin Bergstrom was born in Neenah, Wisconsin, of Norwegian immigrant ancestry. His father, George O. Bergstrom, was a prominent businessman and local politician. The Bergstroms' home, now known as the George O. Bergstrom House, is listed on the National Register of Historic Places. George Edwin Bergstrom attended Phillips-Andover Academy, and was in the Yale University class of 1896. He earned a Bachelor of Science degree from Massachusetts Institute of Technology in 1899. Bergstrom settled in Los Angeles, California, in 1901. In 1903, he married the former Nancy Kimberly, daughter of John A. Kimberly, a co-founder of Kimberly-Clark. They had two children; Alice Cheney Bergstrom and George Edwin Bergstrom, Jr.

=== Career ===
From 1905 to 1915, Bergstrom was in partnership with architect John Parkinson. The firm of Parkinson & Bergstrom designed numerous public and private buildings throughout Southern California, and designed many of the major office and commercial buildings erected in downtown Los Angeles during this period. Among these were the Los Angeles Athletic Club, the Alexandria Hotel, and the original building of Bullock's Department Store. The firm also received commissions for major projects as distant as Salt Lake City, first for the Kearns Building, erected in 1911 for U.S. Senator Thomas Kearns, a mining, newspaper, railroad and banking magnate and later, the Hotel Utah, now the Joseph Smith Memorial Building, was erected in 1909–1911.

After establishing his own practice in 1915, Bergstrom continued to design buildings throughout the region, including buildings for John C. Fremont High School, and Redlands High School, at Redlands, California. He designed buildings for the Elks Club and the Commercial Club in downtown Los Angeles, and collaborated with architect William Lee Woollett (1874–1955) on Grauman's Metropolitan Theatre (later called the Paramount Theatre) for impresario Sid Grauman. One of his most notable buildings of the period was the Pasadena Civic Auditorium in Pasadena, California, which he designed in association with architects Cyril Bennett and Fitch Haskell.

Between 1925 and 1931, Bergstrom associated on the Pasadena Civic Auditorium, with the Pasadena architectural firm of Haskell and Bennett, which was composed of John Cyril Bennett (1891–1957) and Fitch Harrison Haskell (1883–1962). The firm of Bergstrom and Witmer, Architects was in operation from 1941 to 1943. Bergstrom and David J. Witmer (1888–1973) acted as the Chief Architects for the Pentagon Building. Bergstrom and Witmer did the basic design work in a remarkably short time during 1941, between July 17 and 22. Bergstrom was replaced as chief architect by Witmer in April 1942 following Bergstorm's resignation due to unrelated charges of improper conduct while he was president of the American Institute of Architects.

Active in civic affairs, Bergstrom served as president of the Municipal Housing Commission for seven years and was a member of the Municipal Art Commission. He also served as chairman of the advisory board of the University of Southern California's School of Architecture. He was president of the Southern California chapter of the American Institute of Architects for two years, and served three years as director of the institute. Active in numerous clubs and civic organizations, he served as a director of the Los Angeles Athletic Club, and was president of the Allied Architect's Association of Los Angeles.

He died in 1955 and was buried at Forest Lawn Memorial Park in Glendale, California.

== Architectural firms ==
- Parkinson and Bergstrom, Architects (1905–1915)
- Bergstrom, Haskell and Bennett, Associated Architects (1925–1932)
- Bergstrom and Witmer, Architects (1941–1943)

== Selected works ==
Buildings designed by Bergstrom include (in Los Angeles, California unless otherwise noted):

=== Parkinson and Bergstrom ===
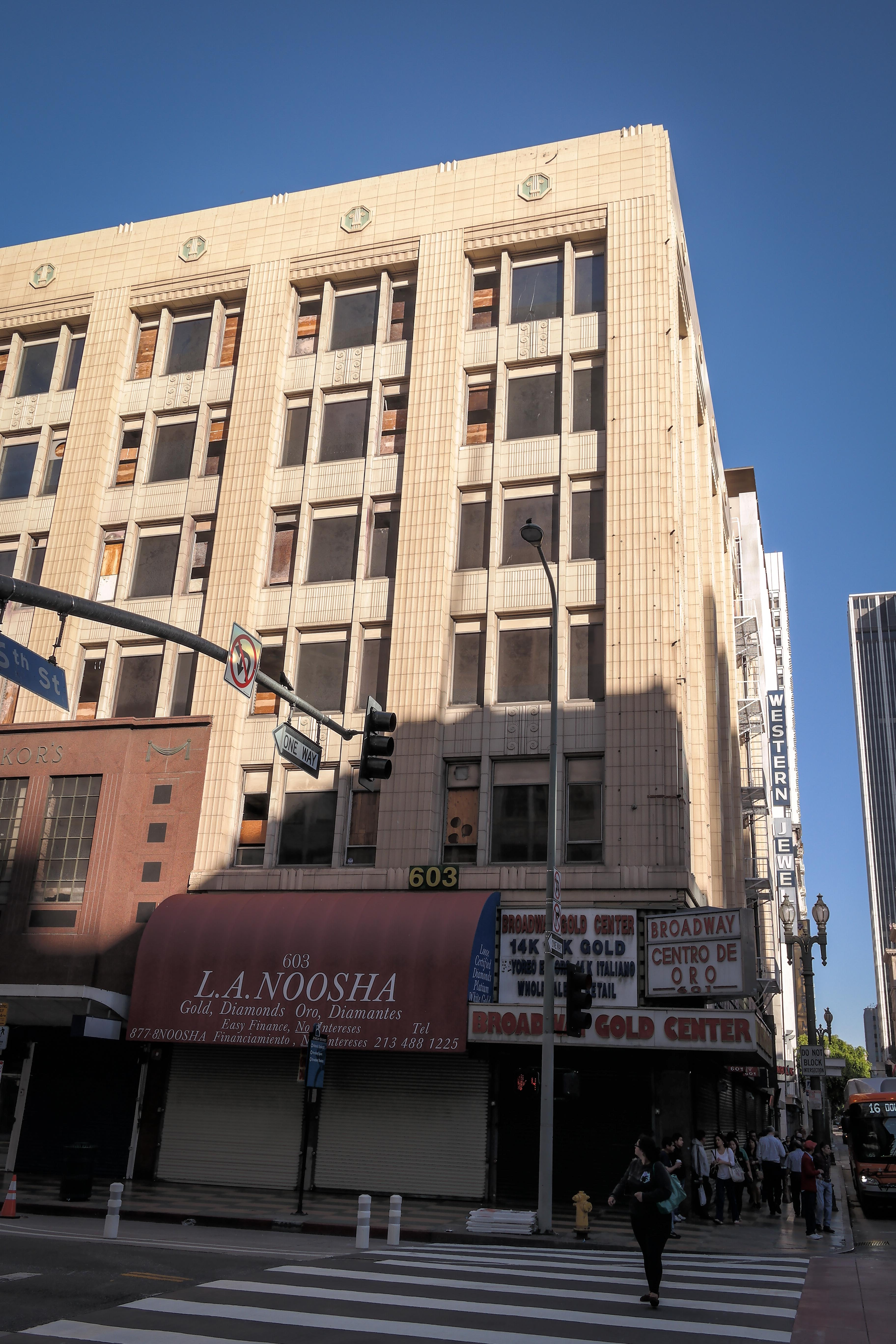
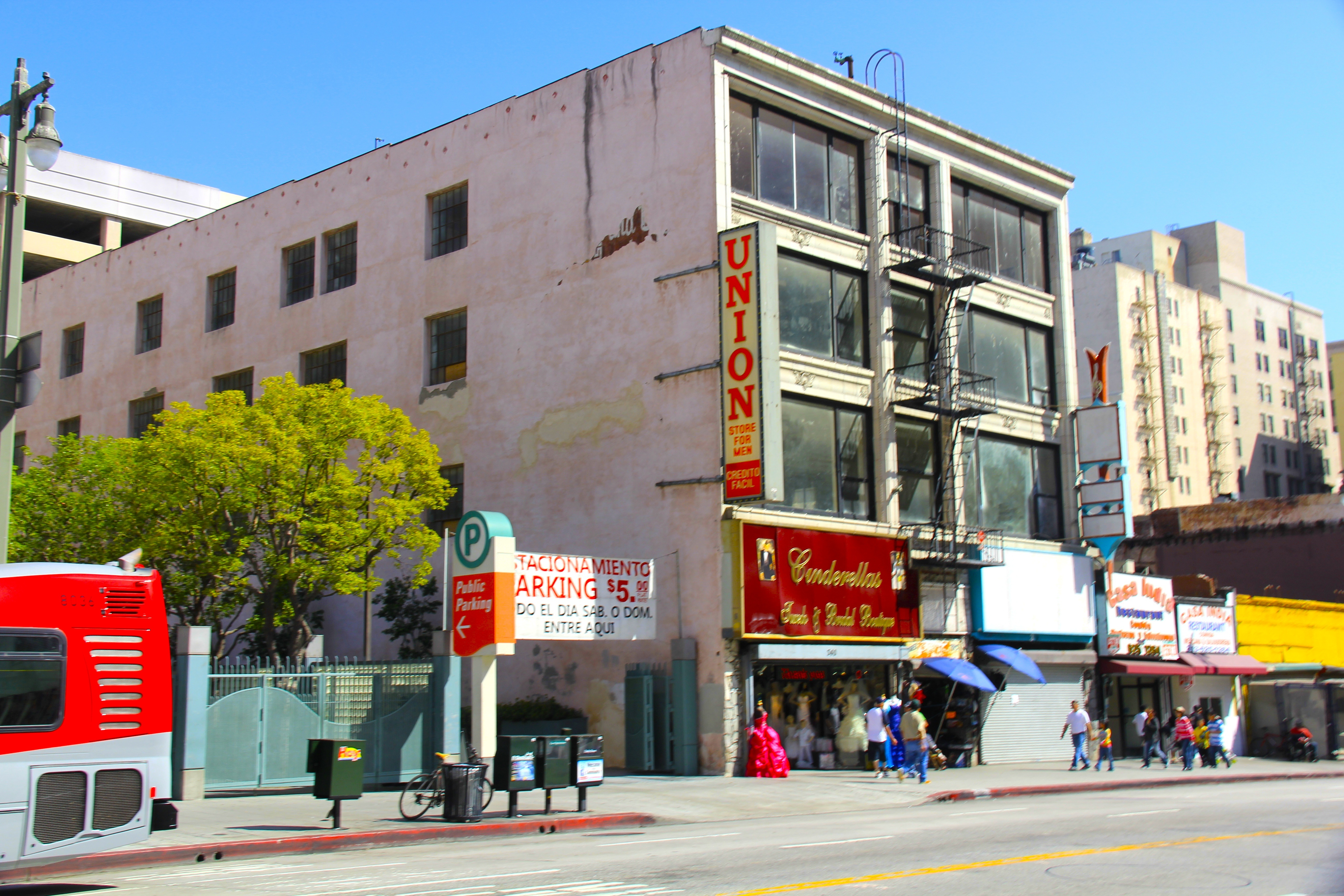
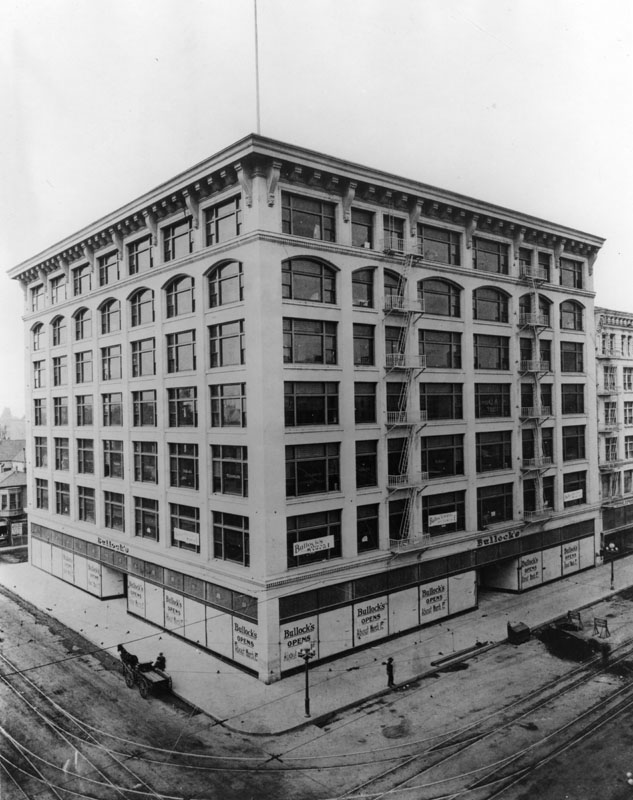
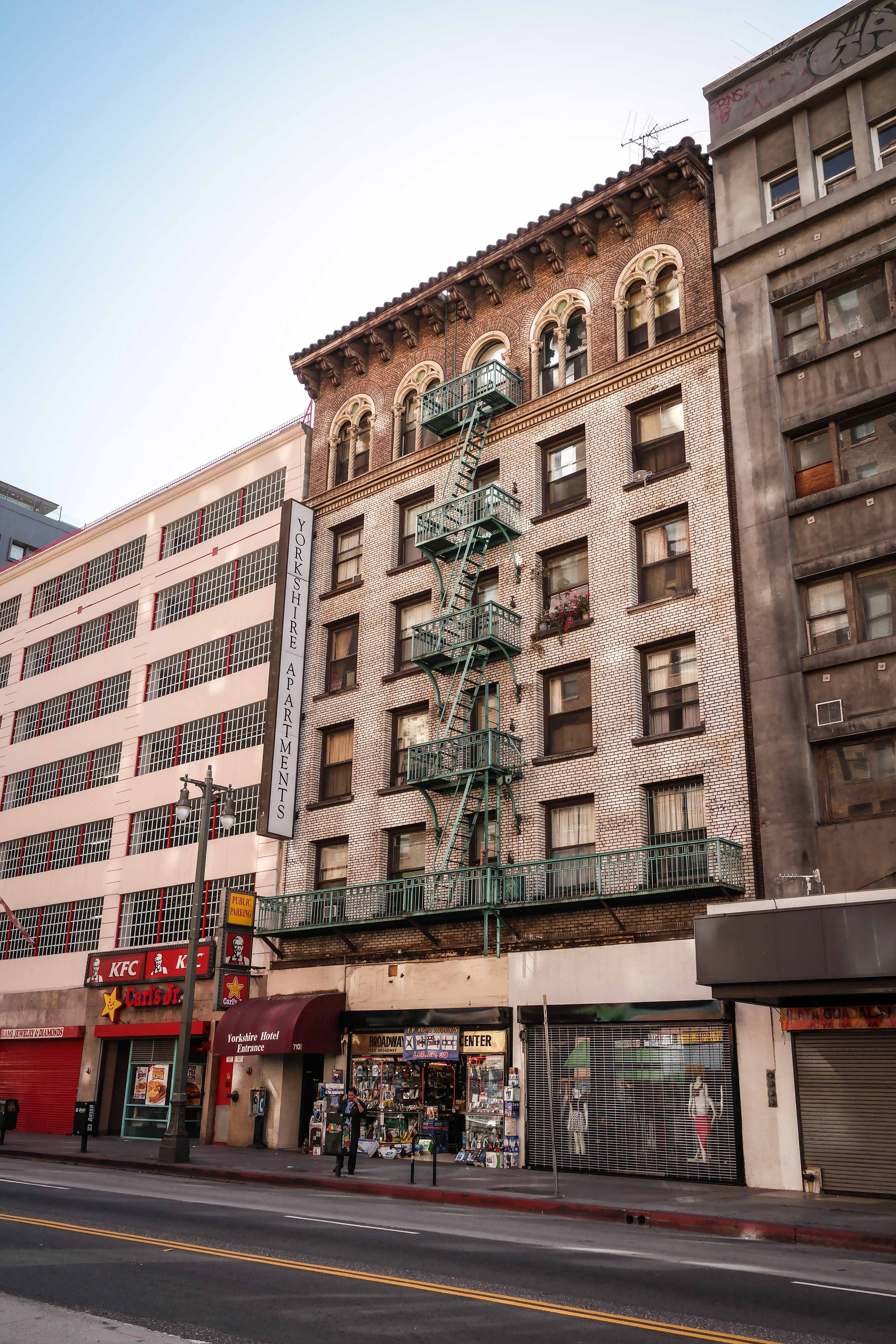
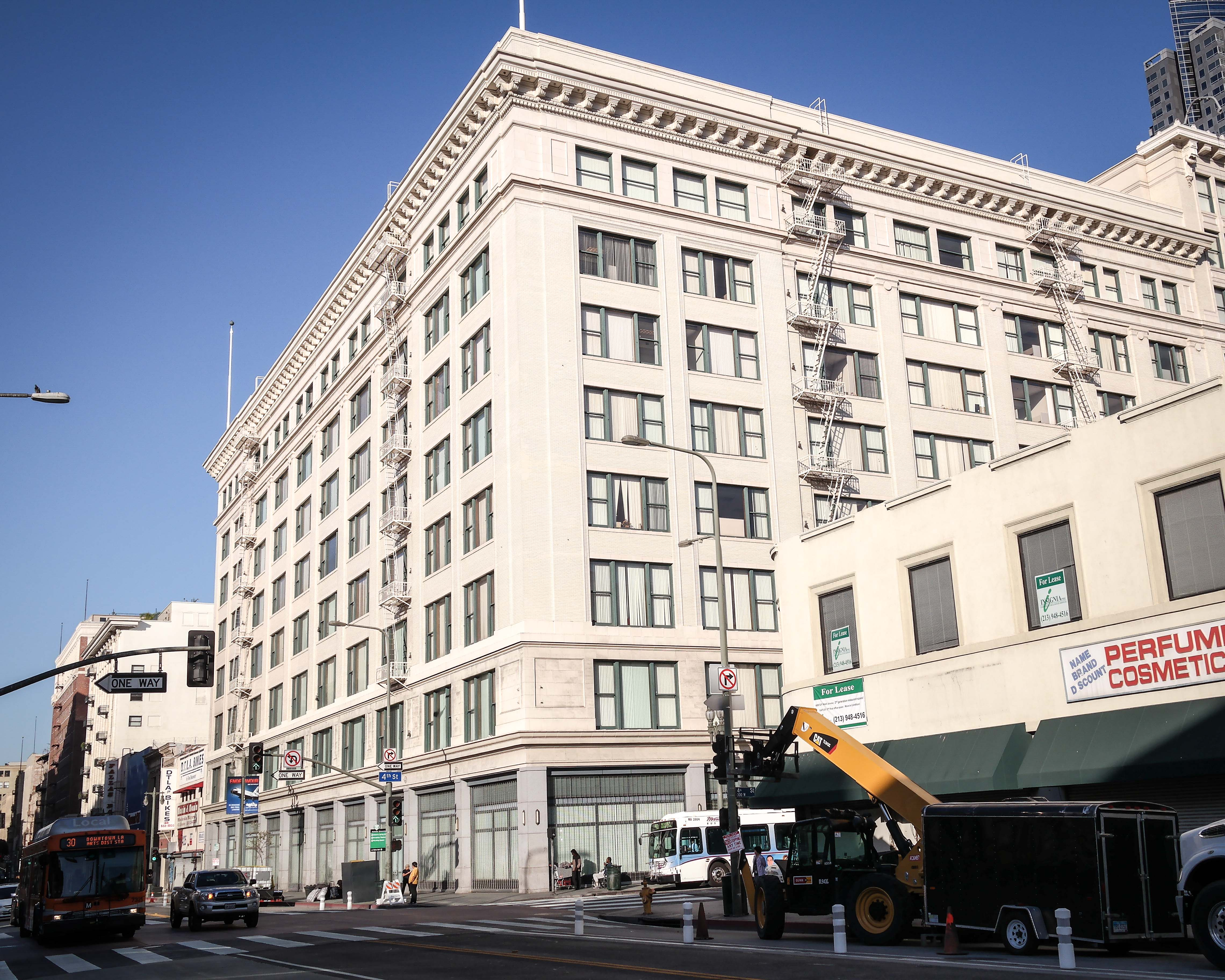
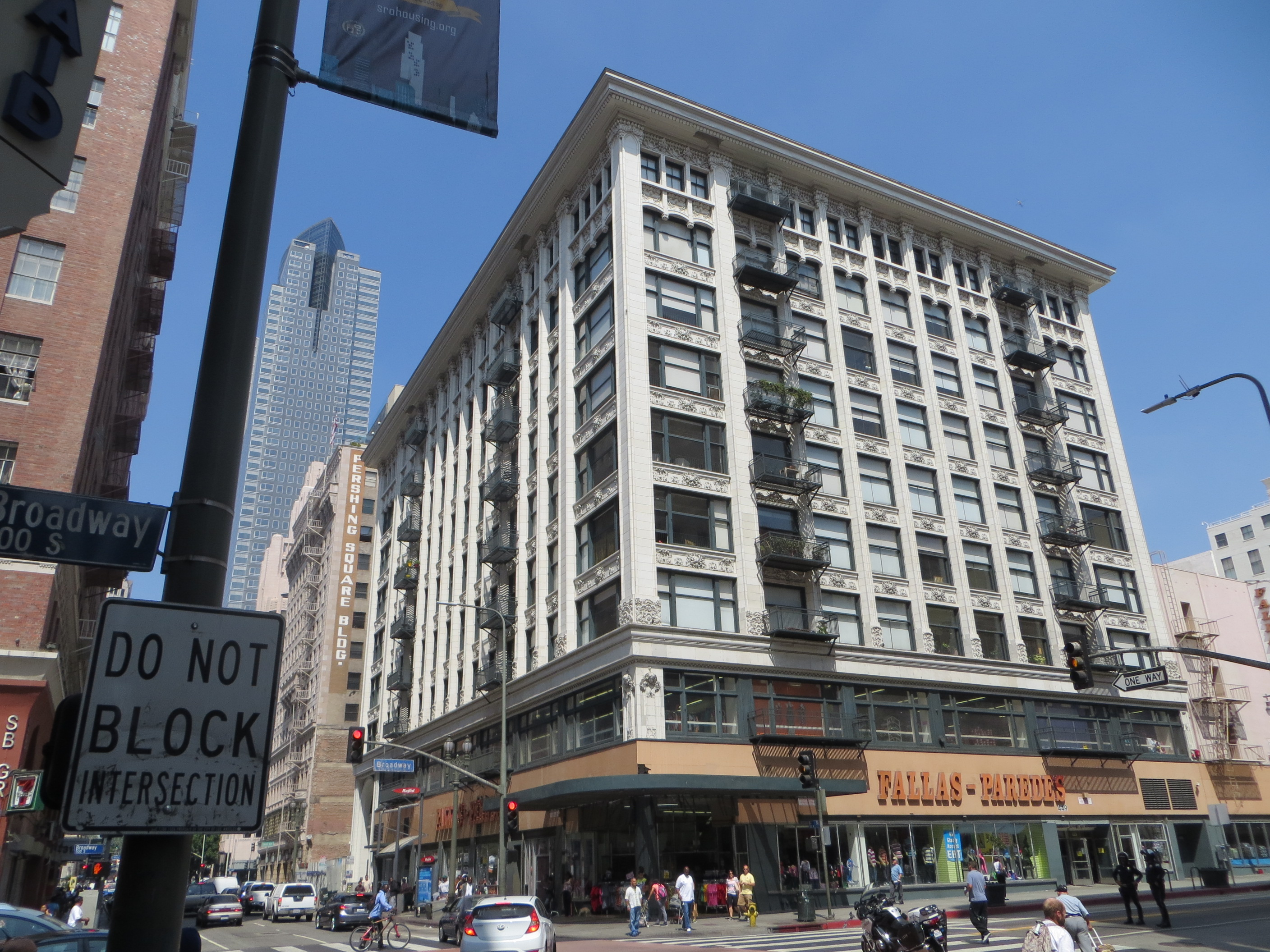
Contributing properties in the Broadway Theater and Commercial District (clockwise from upper-left): Norton Building, Trustee Building, Yorkshire Hotel, Metropolitan Building Broadway Mart Center, Bullock's Building

==== Broadway Theater and Commercial District ====
- Trustee Building (1905)
- Norton Building (1906)
- Bullock's Building (1906-1907)
- Yorkshire Hotel (1909)
- Broadway Department Store (1913)
- Metropolitan Building (1913)

==== Spring Street Financial District ====
- Security Building (1906)
- Pacific Southwest Bank (1910)
- A.G. Bartlett Building (c. 1911)
- Rowan Building (1910)
- Hotel Alexandria Annex (1911)
- Washington Building (1912)
- Stationers Annex (1913)
- Crocker Bank (1914)

==== Elsewhere ====
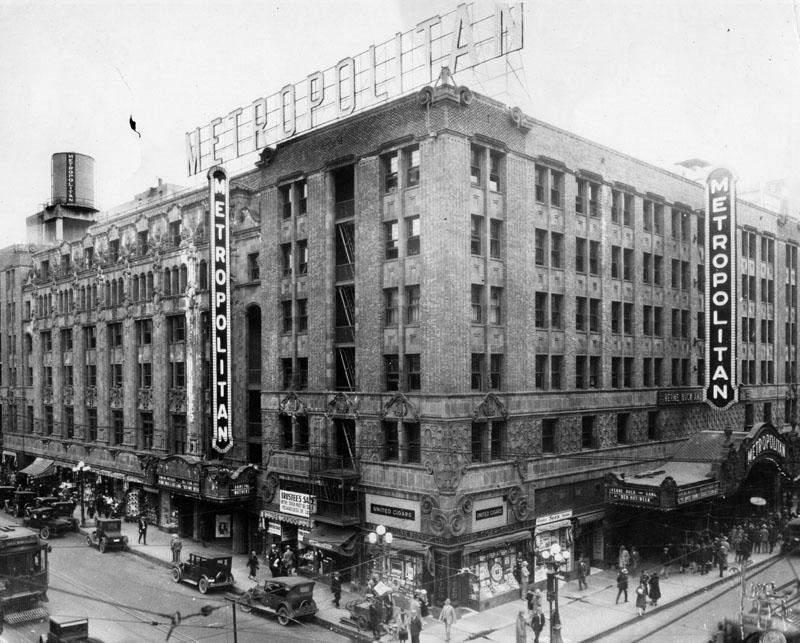
Grauman's Metropolitan Theatre

- Brownstone Hotel (1905)
- O.T. Johnson Commercial Building No. 3 (1906)
- Little Sisters of the Poor Home for the Aged (1906)
- Spreckels Brothers Warehouse (1909)
- Anthony, Earle C. Incorporated Building No. 1 (1911)
- Ford Motor Company Factory (1912)
- Citizens Bank Building, Pasadena (1914)
- Security First National Bank (1915–1916)

=== Solo work ===
- Ansonia Apartments (1916)
- Garrick Theatre (1921 remodel)
- Grauman's Metropolitan Theatre (1921–1923)
- Pasadena Municipal Auditorium, Pasadena (1925–1932)
- The Pentagon (1941–1943), Washington DC
