= St. Vincent's Place =

California Historic Landmark

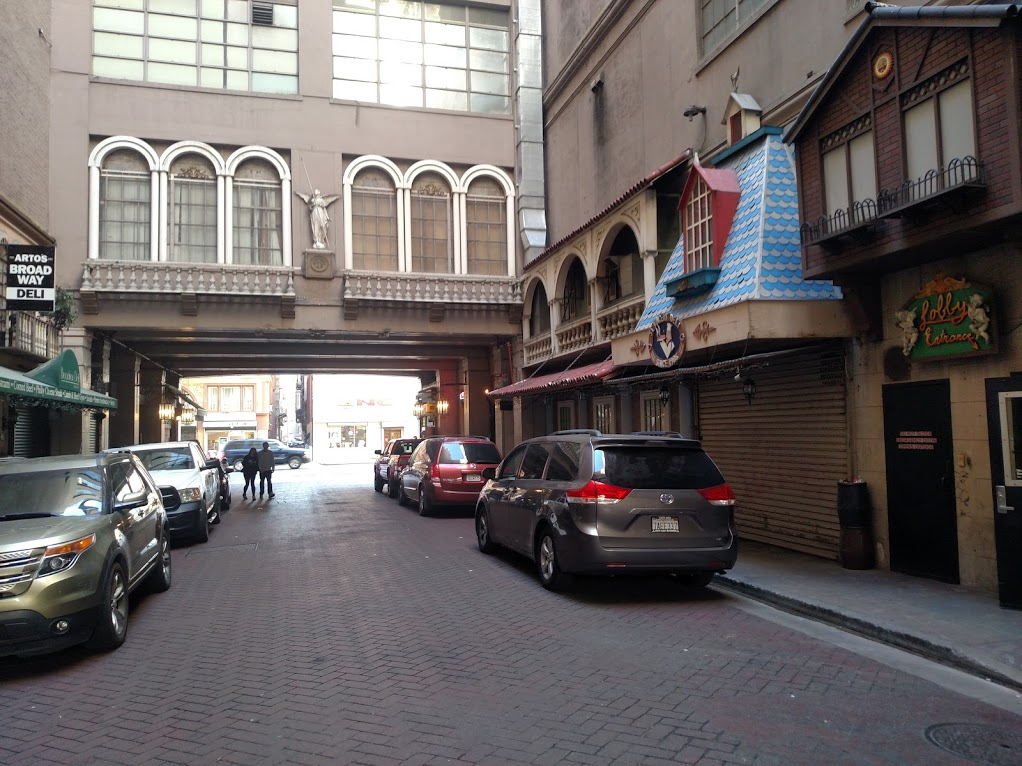
- St Vincent Court in 2017, site of St. Vincent's Place from 1868 to 1887

- Location within the Los Angeles metropolitan area
- 34°02′44″N 118°15′13″W
- Location: 7th Street and Broadway in Los Angeles

History
- Built: 1868

California Historical Landmark
- Designated: Feb. 25, 1957
- Reference no.: 567

St. Vincent's Place is a historic landmark that was the second location of Saint Vincent College in Central Los Angeles, California. St. Vincent's Place was designated a California Historic Landmark (No.567) on Feb. 25, 1957.

== History ==
St. Vincent's College was started by Vincentian Fathers in 1865 and was the first College in Southern California. St. Vincent's Place is located at St. Vincent Court at 7th Street and Broadway in the City of Los Angeles in Los Angeles County. St. Vincent's College became L.A. College in 1911 and Loyola Marymount University in 1917. Saint Vincent's College used the Downtown Los Angeles site from 1868 to 1887. Broadway was called Fort Street in 1868. St. Vincent's Court is now a small alley running through the center of the former Bullock's complex, this was the main entrance to St. Vincent’s College in 1868, a keen city promoter remodeled it as an imitation of a European village square.

In 1865, the Vincentian Fathers were commissioned by Bishop Thaddeus Amat y Brusi to found St. Vincent's College for boys in Los Angeles. Father John Asmuth, was the first President Rector. Classes were held for two years in the Lugo Adobe on the east side of the Plaza while a new building was being finished. The historic home, aptly donated by Don Vicente Lugo, was one of few two-story adobes then in town. The house stood in the empty lot across Alameda Street between the Plaza and Union Station, (near Olvera Street). After two years, the college and school moved into a new, brick building several blocks south by the lower plaza, Pershing Square. Later, the brick building was replaced with a larger one in stone that became a familiar landmark for its stately, central tower topped by a mansard roof. The property took up the block bounded by Fort (Broadway), 6th, Hill, and 7th streets. When St. Vincent's later moved to a new campus, the old building became US Army Headquarters, and in 1907, the large Bullock’s department store was built and operated here until 1983. Today, the site is in the heart of Los Angeles's Jewelry District, encompassing St. Vincent Court. In 1869, St. Vincent's was accredited by the state.

In 1887, the college moved to a new, more majestic campus—bounded by Grand Avenue, Washington Boulevard, Hope Street, and 18th—which would have a chapel, residence hall, cottages, and a traditional, brick-and-ivy complex housing classrooms and lecture halls. Like the second college building by Pershing Square, the new retained a tall, central tower topped with St. Vincent's trademark mansard roof. St. Vincent's Court was featured in Our Neighborhoods with Huell Howser.

== Marker ==
St. Vincent's Place was designated a California Historic Landmark (No.567) on Feb. 25, 1957. The marker on the site reads:

- No. 567 St. Vincent's Place was the site of Saint Vincent's College from 1868 to 1887. Founded by the Vincentian Fathers in 1865, the college was the first institution of higher learning in Southern California and is now known as Loyola University.

== See also ==
- California Historical Landmarks in Los Angeles County
- Lugo Adobe location of Saint Vincent College from 1867 to 1869, also a California Historical Landmark.
