= Bullock's complex =

Historic buildings in Los Angeles, USA

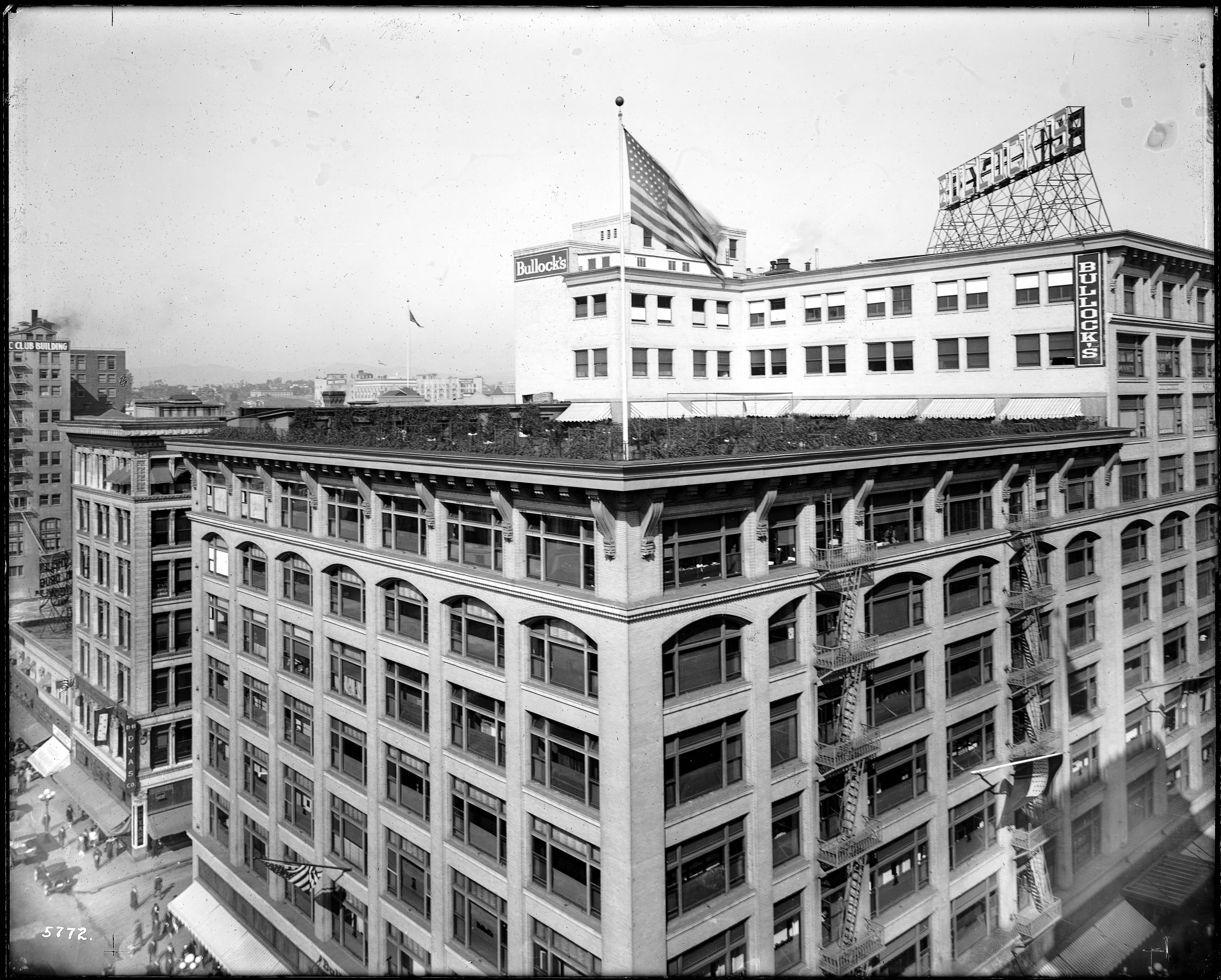
- Bullock's complex in 1917

- Location of complex in Los Angeles County
- 34°02′46″N 118°15′13″W
- Location: 639-651 S. Broadway, the 300-block of 7th Street, and 634-670 S. Hill Street

History
- Built: 1906-1934

Site notes
- Architect(s): Parkinson and Bergstrom; Morgan and Walls; Hudson and Munsell; Parkinson and Hubbard; Parkinson and Parkinson
- Architectural styles: Beaux Arts; Moderne

U.S. National Register of Historic Places
- Official name: Broadway Theater and Commercial District - nine contributing properties
- Designated: May 9, 1979
- Reference no.: 79000484

Bullock's complex is a collection of nine historic buildings located at 639-651 south Broadway, the 300-block of 7th Street, and 634-670 south Hill Street in the Jewelry District and Broadway Theater District in the historic core of downtown Los Angeles. Each building is a contributing property in the National Register of Historic Places-listed Broadway Theater and Commercial District, five buildings are contributing properties in the City of Los Angeles-recognized Hill Street Commercial Historic District, and four buildings are contributing properties in the City of Los Angeles-recognized Seventh Street Commercial Historic District.

The complex is currently the site of the St. Vincent's Jewelry Center. It was formerly the first and flagship site of Bullock's, known as Bullock's Downtown.

== History ==
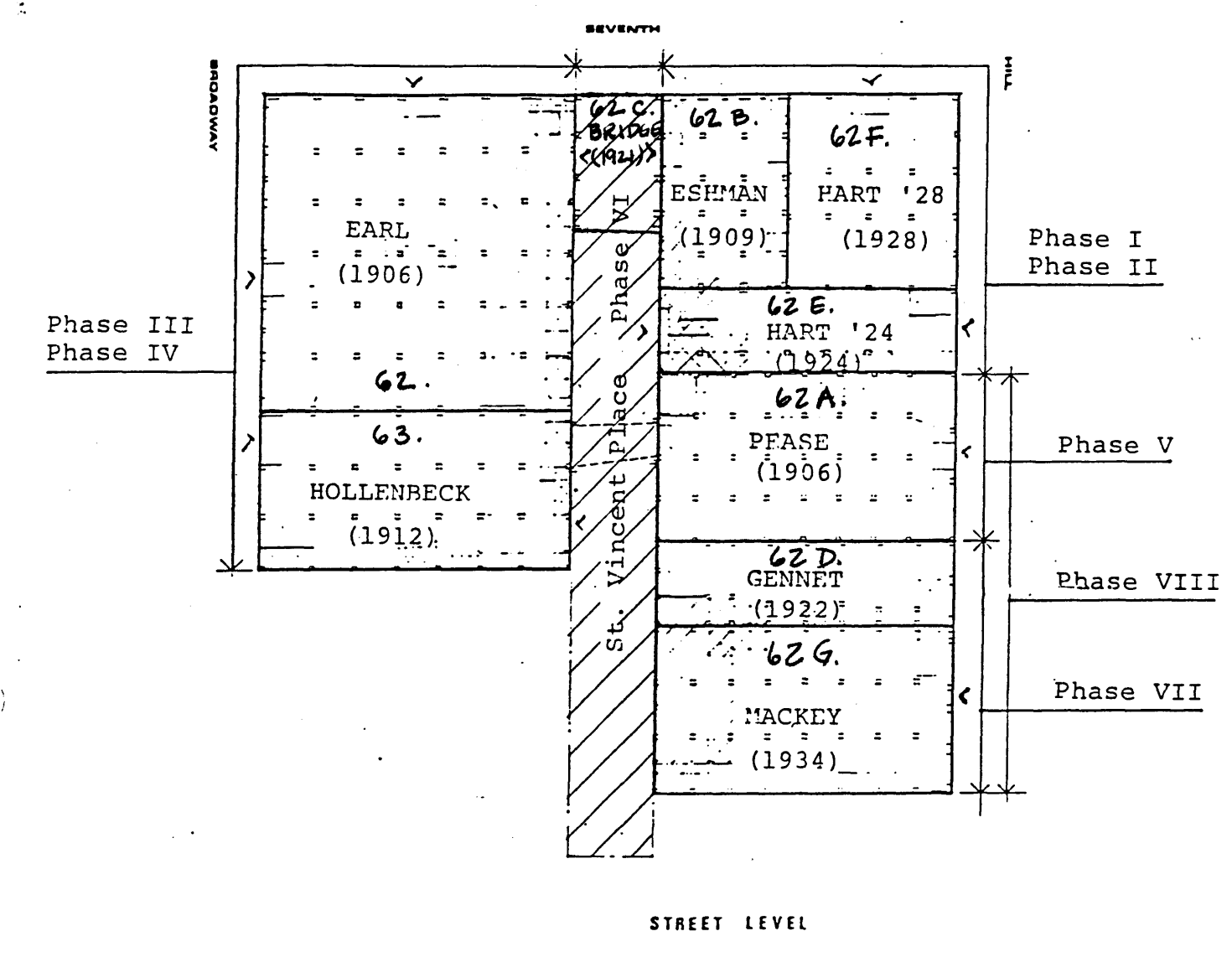
Layout of the nine buildings that comprised Bullock's Downtown

Bullock's complex began with the Bullock's building (also known as Earl or Tehama building), located on the corner of Broadway and 7th. This building, seven-stories in height, was built in 1906. It was financed by Arthur Letts, designed by Parkinson and Bergstrom, and built for John G. Bullock, who opened the original Bullock's in the building in March 1907. This store became known as Bullock's Downtown after other Bullock's locations opened.

Bullock's Downtown proved so successful that the location expanded eight times in less than three decades, expanding its floor area from 350,000 square feet (33,000 m^{2}) to 806,000 square feet (74,900 m^{2}). These expansions were:

- Bullock's-Hollenbeck (also known as Hollenbeck Block) – built directly to Bullock's's north in 1912
- Pease Building – a Niles Pease owned furniture store purchased and connected by a bridge and tunnel to Hollenbeck's west in 1917
- Eshman (or Eschmann) Building – purchased to Bullock's's west in 1919
- Bridge building – built in 1921 to connect Bullock's and Eshman
- Gennet Building – built directly to Pease's north in 1922
- Hart '24 – built directly to Pease's south and Eshman's north in 1924
- Hart '28 – built directly to Eshman's west and Hart '24's south in 1928
- Mackey Building – built directly to Gennet's north in 1934.

Bullock's Downtown closed in June 1983. The complex later became St. Vincent's Jewelry Center, named after the college that was located at this location prior to Bullock's. Approximately 500 jewelers occupied the building as of 2009, and Big Lots also occupied 40,000 square feet (3,700 m^{2}) in the original Bullock's building, with their location taken over by Burlington Coat Factory in November 2015.

=== Historic designation ===
In 1979, the Broadway Theater and Commercial District was added to the National Register of Historic Places, with all nine buildings in the Bullock's complex listed as contributing properties in the district. In 2016, the city of Los Angeles created the Hill Street Commercial Historic District and the Seventh Street Commercial Historic District, with the Pease, Gennet, Mackey, and both Hart buildings listed as contributing properties in the former and Bullock's, Bridge, Eshman, and Hart '28 listed as contributing properties in the latter.

== Architecture and design ==
Despite being built at different times and designed by different architects, each building in the Bullock's complex is united by design, historical function, and internal circulation.

=== Bullock's ===
- Bullock's
- U.S. Historic district – Contributing property
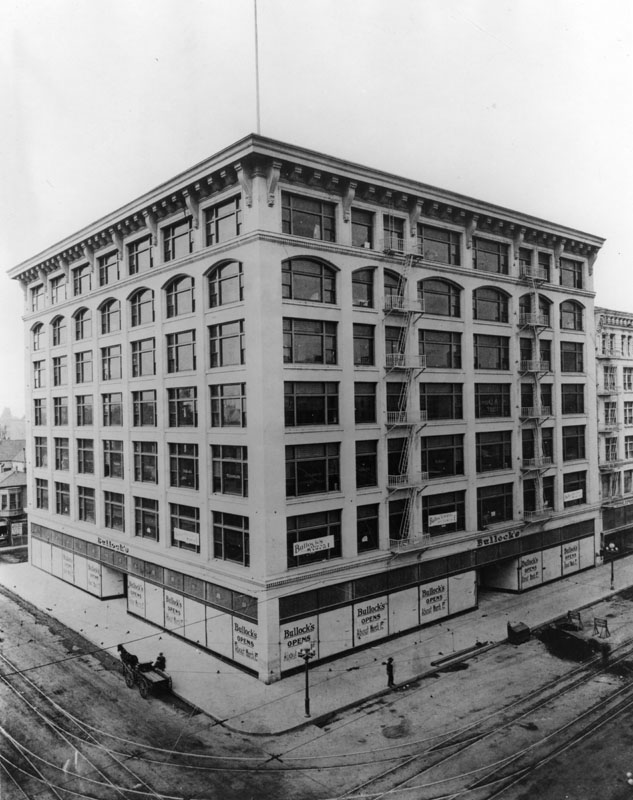
- The original Bullock's building in 1907
- Location: 641-651 S. Broadway and 301-311 W. 7th Street, Los Angeles, California
- Built: 1906
- Architect: Parkinson and Bergstrom
- Architectural style: Beaux Arts

Bullock's is a seven-story steel frame and brick building designed by Parkinson and Bergstrom and built in 1906. It features a Beaux Arts design with a brick and terra cotta facade that includes heavy cornice.

=== Bullock's-Hollenbeck ===
- Bullock's-Hollenbeck
- U.S. Historic district – Contributing property
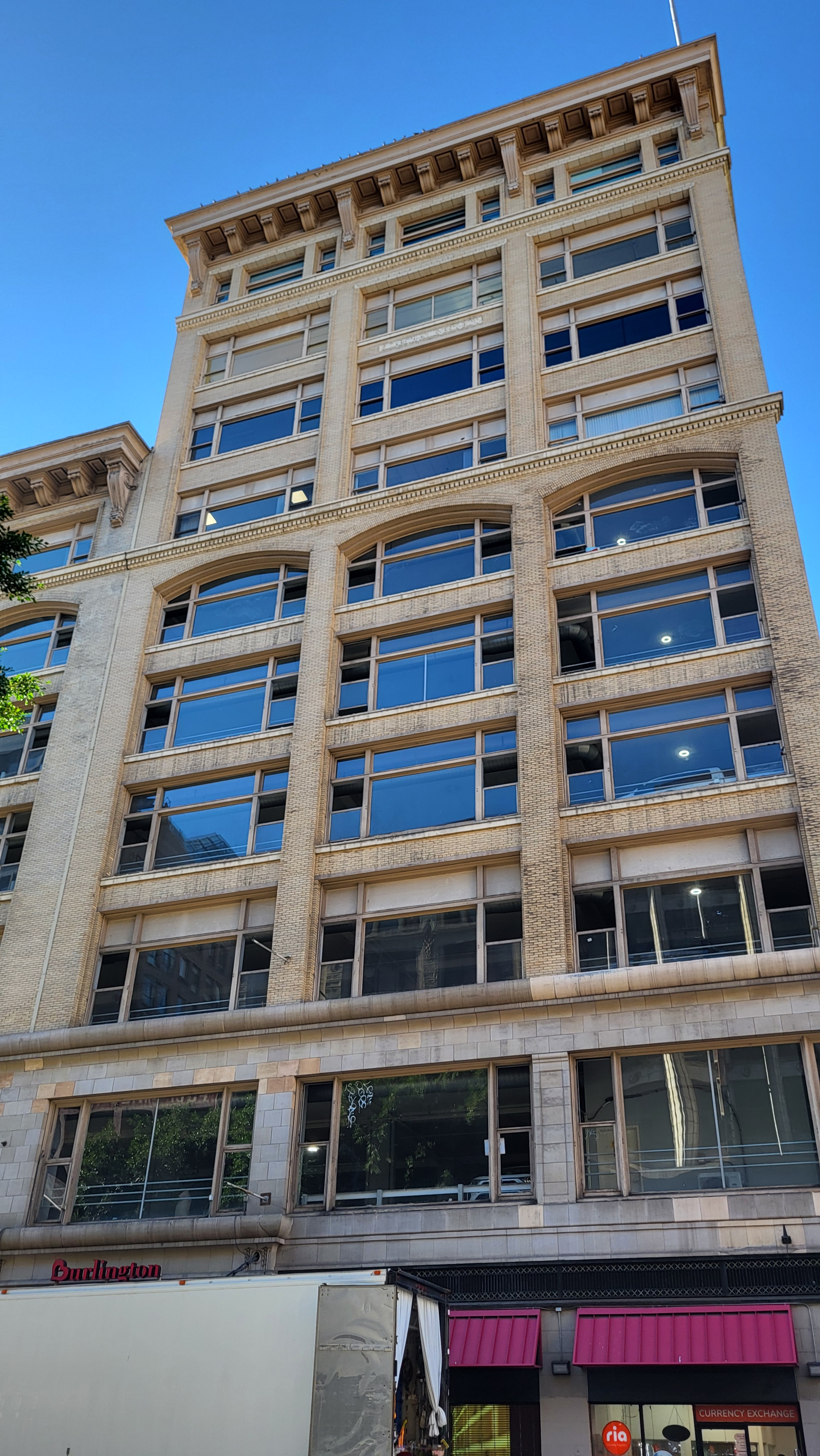
- Bullock's-Hollenbeck in 2025
- Location: 639 S. Broadway, Los Angeles, California
- Built: 1912
- Architect: Morgan and Walls
- Architectural style: Beaux Arts

Bullock's-Hollenbeck is a ten-story brick and reinforced-concrete building designed by Morgan and Walls and built in 1912. It features a brick and terra cotta facade almost identical to the original Bullock's building.

=== Pease Building ===
- Pease Building
- U.S. Historic district – Contributing property
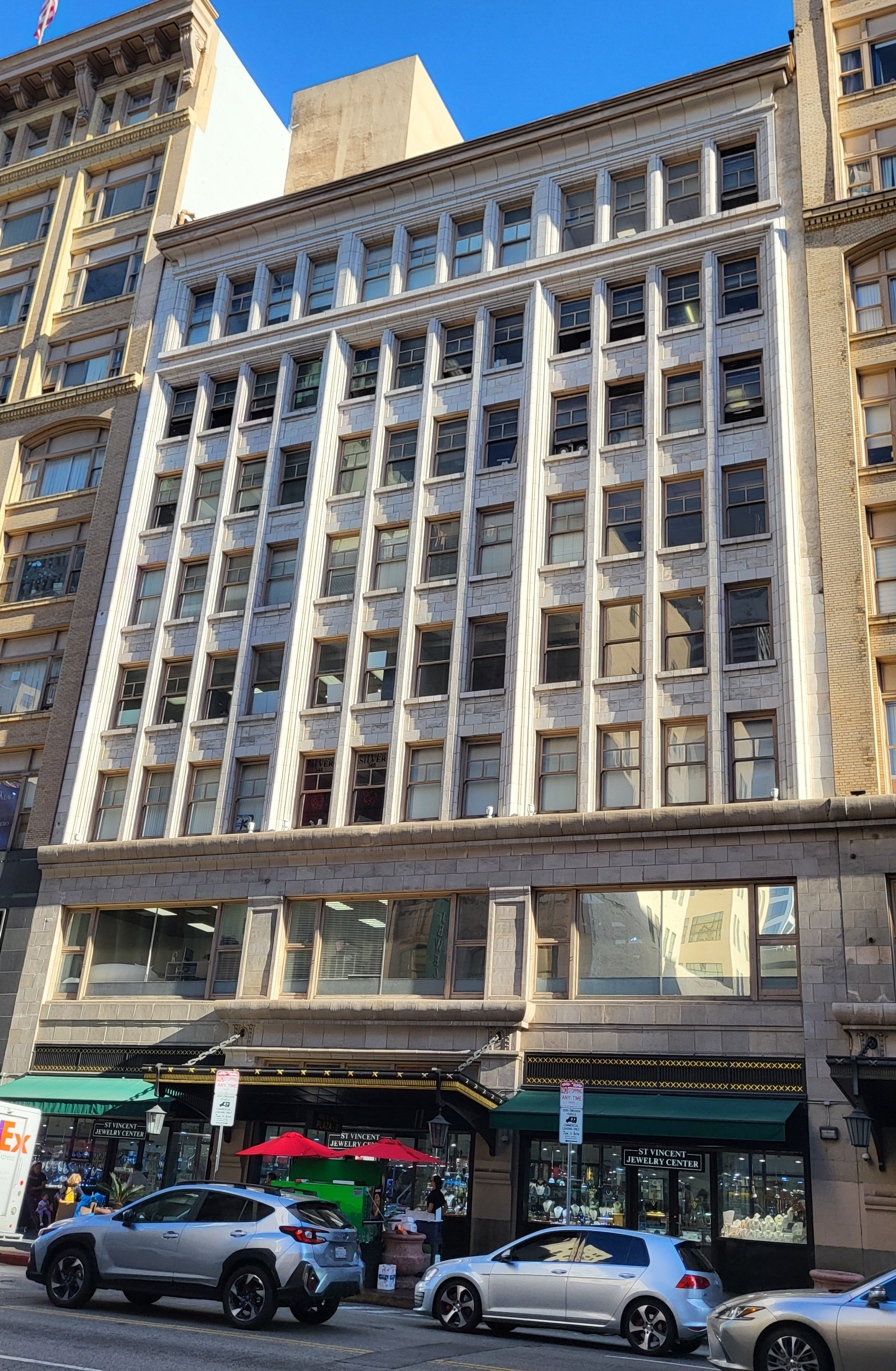
- Pease Building in 2025
- Location: 646 S. Hill St., Los Angeles, California
- Built: 1906
- Architect: Hudson and Munsell
- Architectural style: Beaux Arts

Pease Building is an eight-story Beaux Arts building designed by Hudson and Munsell and built in 1906. A bridge and tunnel connecting the building to Bullock's-Hollenback was built when Bullock's bought this building in 1917.

=== Eshman Building ===
- Eshman Building
- U.S. Historic district – Contributing property
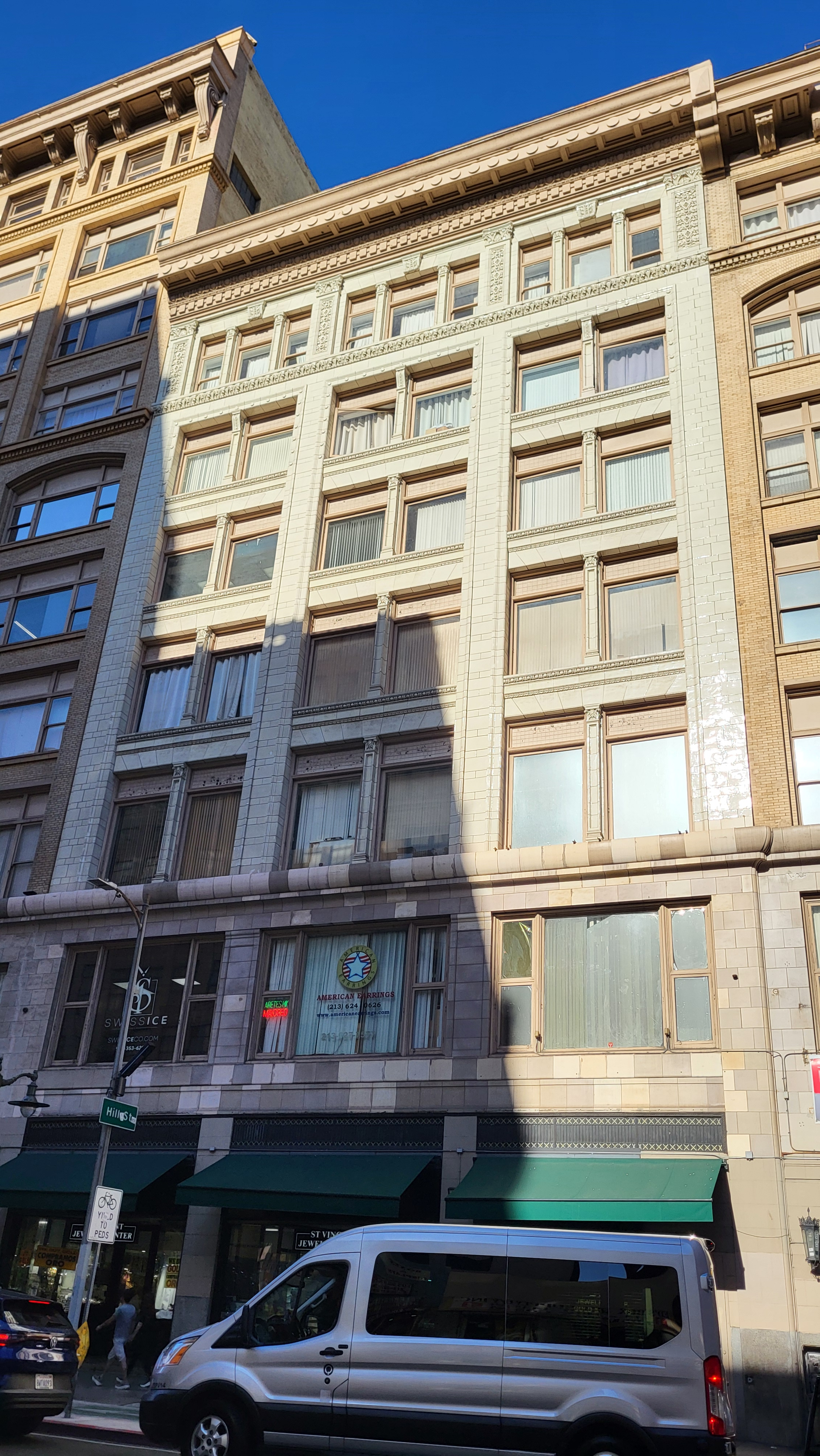
- Eshman Building in 2025
- Location: 345 W. 7th St., Los Angeles, California
- Built: 1909
- Architect: Morgan and Walls
- Architectural style: Beaux Arts

Eshman Building is a seven-story building designed by Morgan and Walls and built in 1909. It features a Beaux Arts design with a three-part vertical division.

=== Bridge ===
- Bridge
- U.S. Historic district – Contributing property
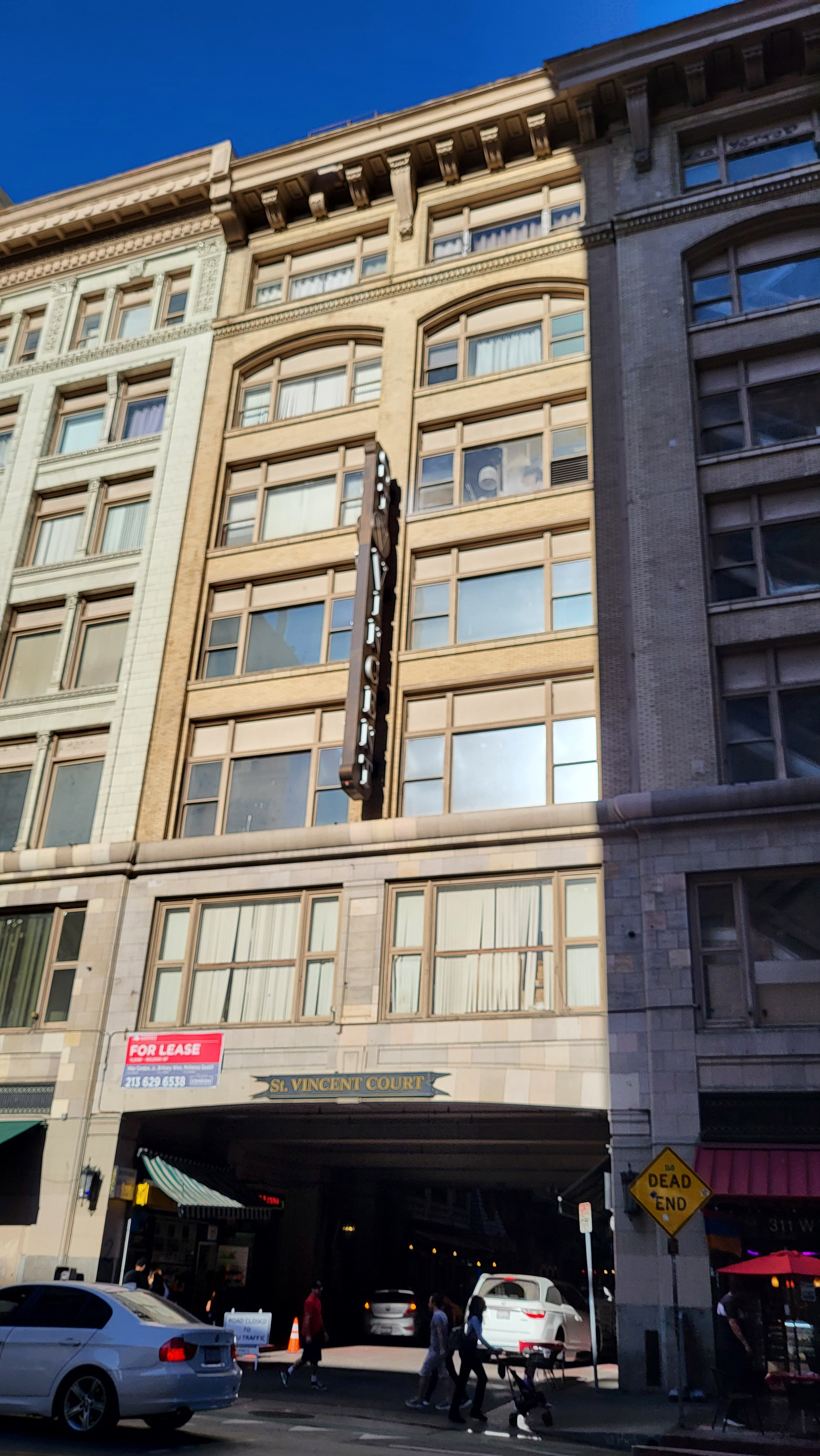
- Bridge building in 2025
- Location: 321 W. 7th St., Los Angeles, California
- Built: 1921
- Architectural style: Beaux Arts

Bridge spans St. Vincent's Place, connecting the upper six stories of the Bullock's and Eshman buildings. The building's design repeats the design of Bullock's building. It was built in 1921.

=== Gennet Building ===
- Gennet Building
- U.S. Historic district – Contributing property
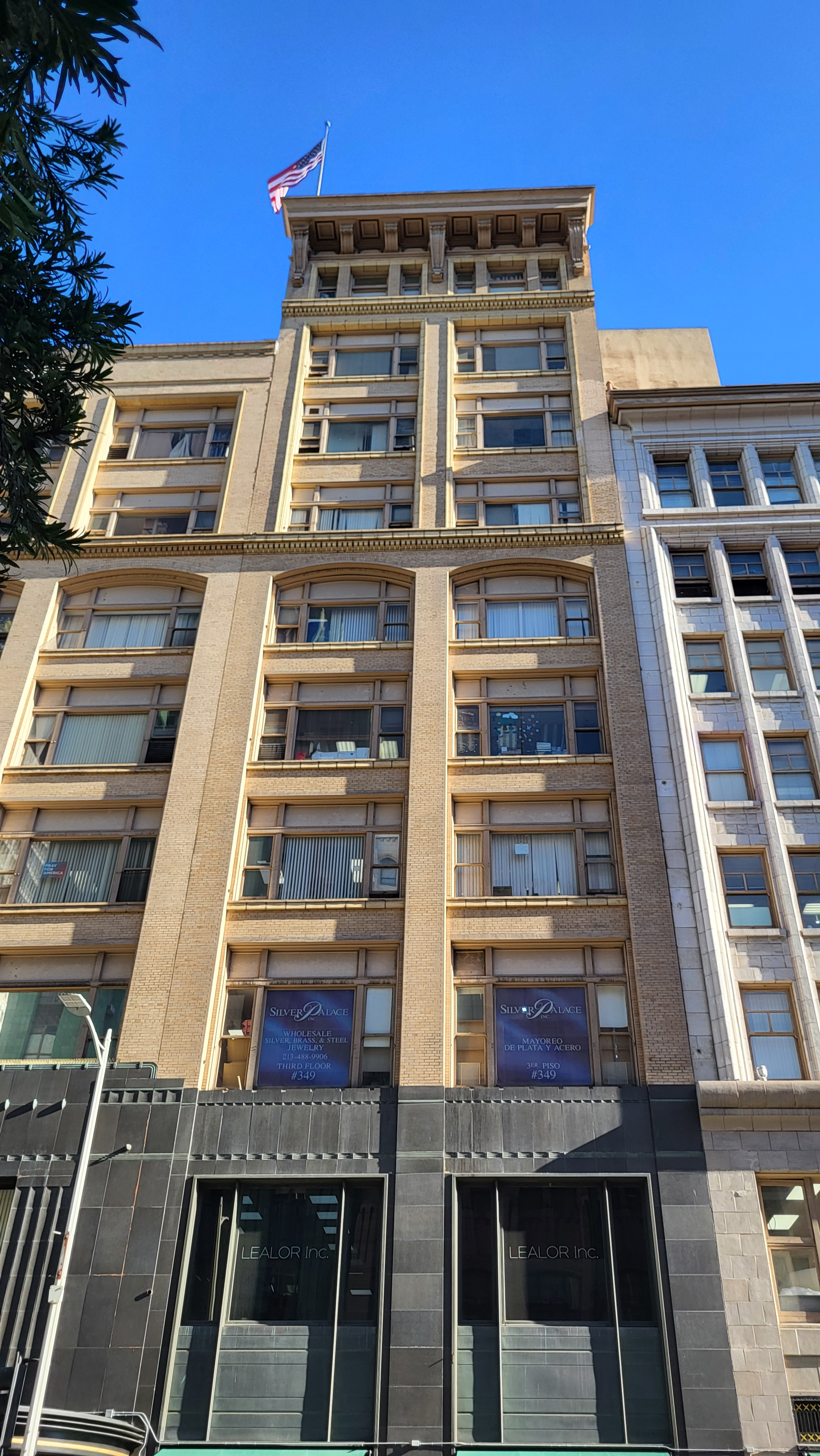
- Gennet Building in 2025
- Location: 640 S. Hill St., Los Angeles, California
- Built: 1922
- Architect: Parkinson and Hubbard
- Architectural style: Beaux Arts and Moderne

Gennet Building is a ten-story, two-bay building designed by Parkinson and Hubbard and built in 1922. The building originally featured a Beaux Arts design on all its exteriors, but in 1934 the bottom two stories were remodeled in the Moderne style to match the Mackey Building.

=== Hart '24 ===
- Hart '24
- U.S. Historic district – Contributing property
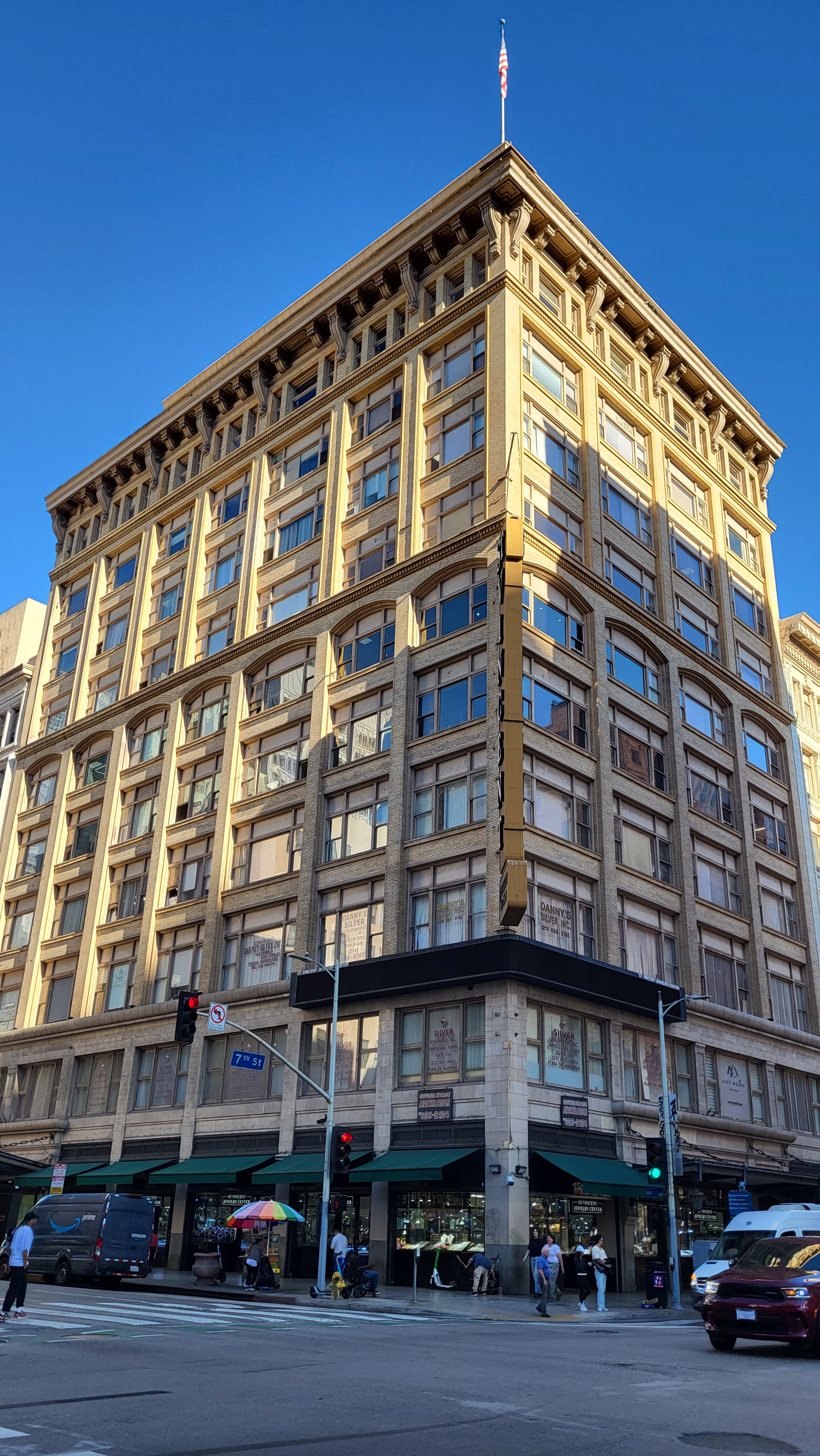
- Hart '24 and '28 from 7th and Hill in 2025
- Location: 652-658 S. Hill St., Los Angeles, California
- Built: 1924
- Architect: Parkinson and Parkinson
- Architectural style: Beaux Arts

Hart '24 is a ten-story building that matches Gennet Building in height, width, and styling. It was designed by Parkinson and Parkinson and built in 1924.

=== Hart '28 ===
- Hart '28
- U.S. Historic district – Contributing property
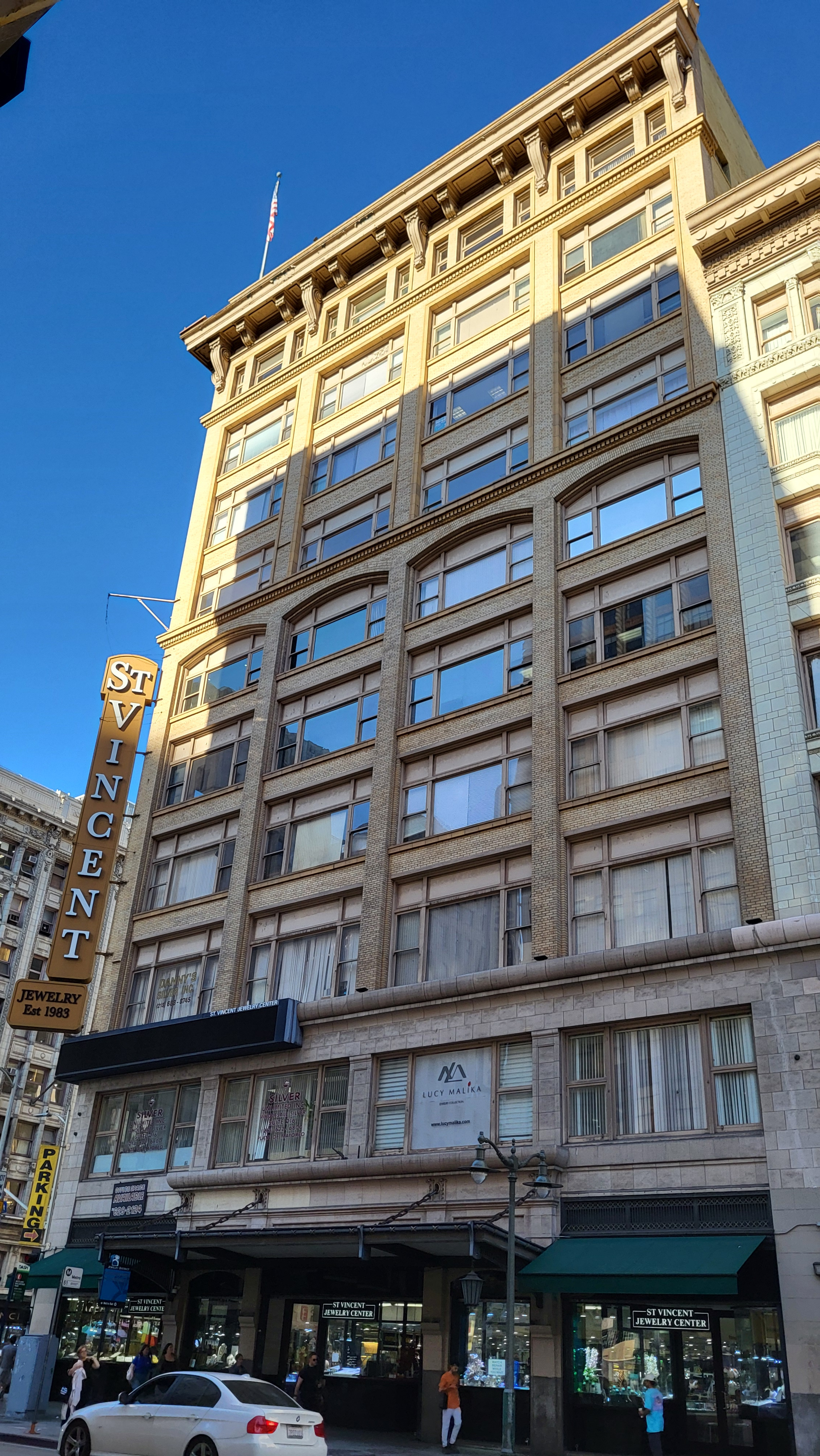
- Hart '28 from 7th Street in 2025
- Location: 670 S. Hill St. and 651 S. 7th St., Los Angeles, California
- Built: 1928
- Architect: Parkinson and Parkinson
- Architectural style: Beaux Arts

Hart '28 is an expansion of Hart '24. The expansion fills out the block and consists of five bays on Hill St. and four bays on 7th. The building is virtually indistinguishable from Hart '24 and features fenestration that consists primarily of three-part Chicago windows.

=== Mackey Building ===
- Mackey Building
- U.S. Historic district – Contributing property
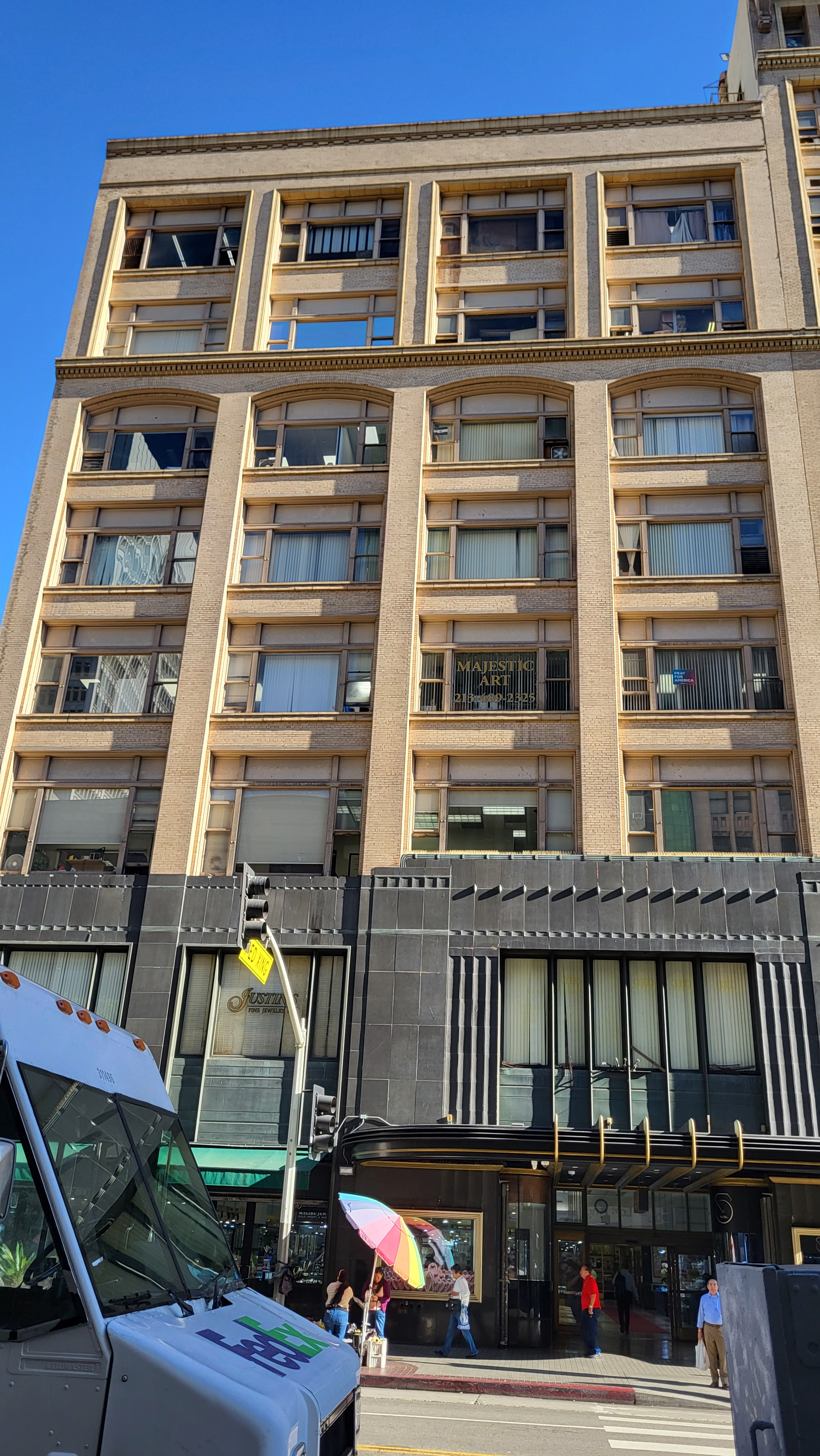
- Mackey Building in 2025
- Location: 634 S. Hill St., Los Angeles, California
- Built: 1934
- Architect: Parkinson and Parkinson
- Architectural style: Beaux Arts and Moderne

Mackey Building is an eight-story building designed by Parkinson and Parkinson and built in 1934. The building's upper six stories repeat the design of Gennet Building, while the bottom two stories feature a Moderne design that was then expanded to Gennet Building to match.

== See also ==
- List of contributing properties in the Broadway Theater and Commercial District
