= Robert Winter (historian) =

American architectural historian (1924–2019)

Robert W. Winter
- Born: July 17, 1924; Indianapolis, Indiana, U.S.
- Died: February 9, 2019 (aged 94); Pasadena, California, U.S.
- Education: Dartmouth College; Johns Hopkins University
- Occupation: Architectural historian

Dr. Robert W. Winter (July 17, 1924 - February 9, 2019) was an architectural historian. He was the Arthur G. Coons Professor of the History of Ideas, Emeritus, at Occidental College, Los Angeles. He is particularly known for his contributions to the history of the California branch of the Arts and Crafts Movement.

== Early life ==
Winter was born in Indianapolis, Indiana in 1924. He received his undergraduate degree (A.B.) from Dartmouth College and his Ph.D. from Johns Hopkins University.

== Career ==
Early in his career he taught at Dartmouth, at Bowdoin, and at the University of California, Los Angeles. He joined the faculty at Occidental in 1963 and retired in 1994.

Winter lived in Pasadena in the Batchelder House that formerly belonged to tilemaker Ernest Batchelder, about whom he wrote the definitive Batchelder history, Batchelder Tilemaker (1999).

Winter is the author of numerous books including The California Bungalow (1980) and American Bungalow Style (1996). With Dr. David Gebhard, of the University of California at Santa Barbara, he co-authored guides to architecture in Northern and Southern California. He was best known for these architectural guidebooks, especially the one for the Los Angeles Area, often referred to as "The Guide". There are 6 editions of the Los Angeles guidebook, dating from 1965, 1977, 1985, 1994, 2003 and 2018. Winter published the fifth edition after Gebhard's death in 1996 and the sixth edition, in which he collaborated with historian Robert Inman, was released in December 2018.

In 2007, Winter was made a Fellow the Society of Architectural Historians.

== Death ==
Winter died on February 9, 2019, at age 94.

== Works ==
Authored

- Winter, Robert (photographs by Alex Vertikoff), American Bungalow Style, Simon & Schuster, New York 1996, ISBN 0-684-80168-X
- Winter, Robert (photographs by Alex Vertikoff), The Architecture of Entertainment: L.A. in the Twenties, Gibbs Smith Publisher, Salt Lake City 2006, ISBN 1-58685-797-5
- Winter, Robert, Batchelder: Tilemaker, Balcony Press, Los Angeles 1999, ISBN 1-890449-03-2
- Winter, Robert, The California Bungalow, Hennessey & Ingalls, Los Angeles 1980, ISBN 0-912158-85-9
- Winter, Robert (photographs by Alex Vertikoff), Craftsman Style, Harry N. Abrams Publishers, New York 2004, ISBN 0-8109-4336-0

Co-authored

- Andersen, Tim, Moore, Eudorha M. and Winter, Robert, editors, California Design 1910, Peregrine Smith, Santa Barbara 1980, ISBN 0-87905-055-1
- Gebhard, David, and Winter, Robert, A Guide to Architecture in Los Angeles & Southern California, Peregrine Smith, Santa Barbara 1977
- Gebhard, David, and Winter, Robert, Architecture in Los Angeles: A Complete Guide, Gibbs M. Smith-Peregrine Smith Books, Salt Lake City 1985; revised and updated by Robert Winter as An Architectural Guidebook to Los Angeles, Gibbs Smith, Salt Lake City 2003, ISBN 1-58685-308-2
- Winter, Robert, editor and co-author, Toward a Simpler Way of Life: The Arts & Crafts Architects of California, University of California Press, Berkeley 1997, ISBN 0-520-20916-8
