= Finney's Cafeteria =

Building in Los Angeles, California

- U.S. Historic district – Contributing property
- Los Angeles Historic-Cultural Monument
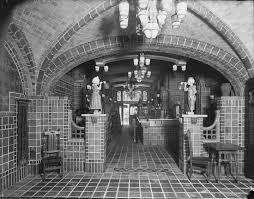
- Ground floor interior in the 1910s

- Location within the Los Angeles metropolitan area
- Location: 217-219 W. 6th Street, Los Angeles, California
- Coordinates: 34°02′49″N 118°15′05″W
- Built: 1898 or 1904, 1913
- Architect: Morgan and Walls (1898); Plummer and Feil (1913)
- Part of: Broadway Theater and Commercial District (ID79000484)
- LAHCM No.: 137

Significant dates
- Designated CP: May 9, 1979
- Designated LAHCM: January 15, 1975

Finney's Cafeteria, also known as Gebhart Building, Eshman Building, The Chocolate Shop, and Museum of Chocolate, is a historic four-story building located at 217-219 W. 6th Street in the Broadway Theater District in the historic core of downtown Los Angeles. The building is most notable for its ground-floor interior tilework, done by Ernest A. Batchelder.

== History ==
=== Construction and early tenants ===
According to the United States Department of the Interior, Finney's Cafeteria was built in 1904, while several other sources have the building named Eshman Building, designed by Morgan and Walls, and built by Gerhard Eshman in 1898.

In 1913, Plummer and Feil redesigned the ground-floor interior to resemble a German beer hall with a Dutch motif. This redesign features tiles by Ernest A. Batchelder that were later painted over, as the owners, the Chocolate Shop Corporation, did not like their original color. The location, named Dutch Chocolate Shop, was the company's fourth and was meant to be the first in a chain of interiors depicting foreign countries, although no others were created.

Dutch Chocolate Shop occupied the remodeled ground floor from 1914 to the mid-to-late 1910s, and Health Cafeteria occupied the chocolate shop location from the 1920s to the 1940s. In 1939, the Dr. A. W. von Lange Health Institute and their twin spa facilities moved into the top floor of this building, where they would remain on-and-off until the mid-1960s, and more significantly, in the late 1940s, Finney's Cafeteria took over the Health Cafeteria location, where they would remain until 1986.

In 1924, Broadway-Spring Arcade opened behind this building, and a rear entrance was added to this building connecting it to the arcade.

=== Preservation and modern use ===
In 1975, Finney's Cafeteria was listed as Los Angeles Historic Cultural Monument No. 137, and in 1979, when the Broadway Theater and Commercial District was added to the National Register of Historic Places, Finney's Cafeteria was listed as a contributing property in the district. The building underwent a seismic retrofit in the 1980s, which amongst other changes sealed the building's upper-story windows.

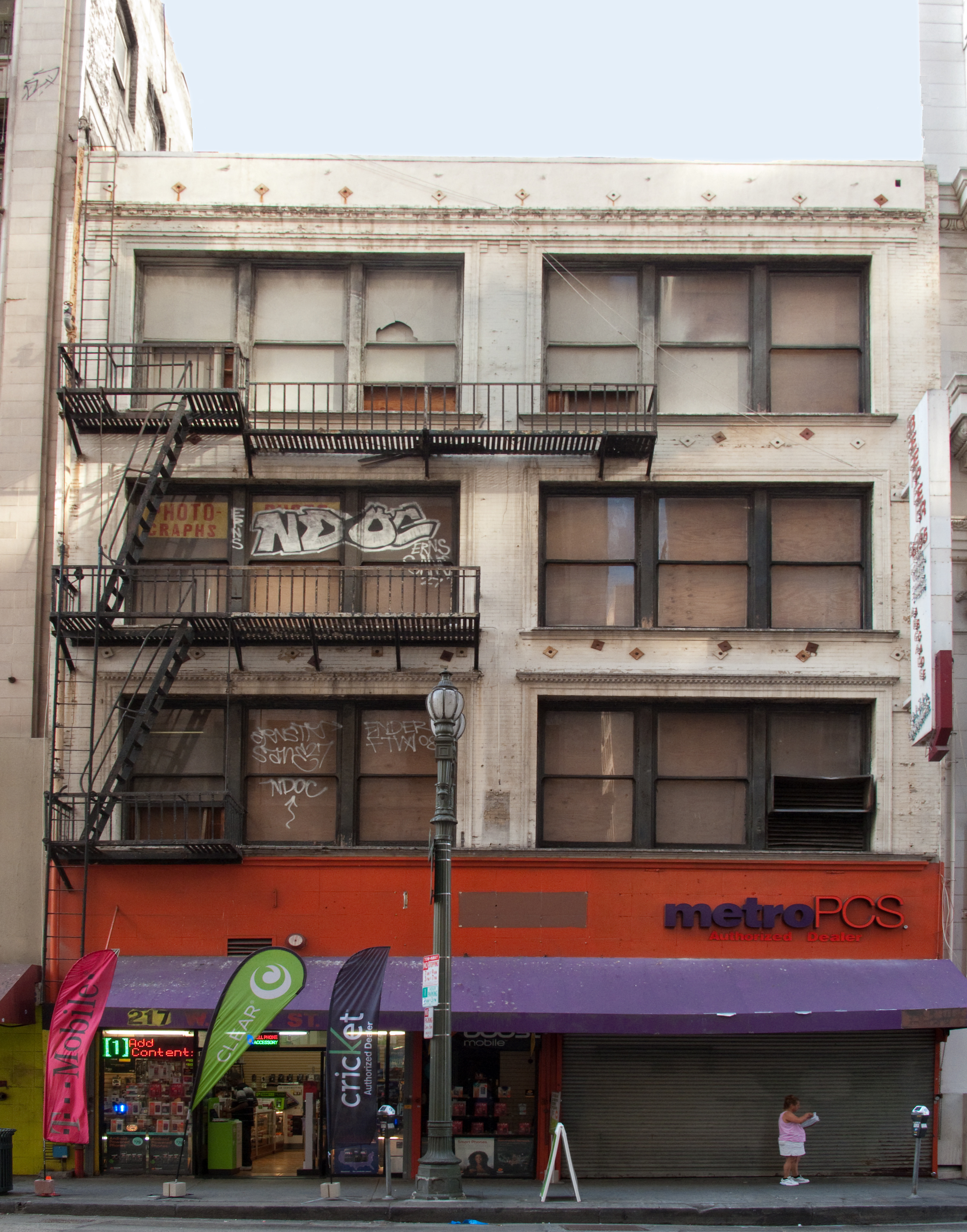
The building in 2012

In the 1990s, the ground floor housed electronics vendors (including at one point a Metro PCS store), with the upper floors vacant and the ground floor tiles and murals boarded up for their protection. The tiles and murals were not uncovered until 2012, after which a full restoration was estimated at $300,000 - $350,000 ($421,000 - $491,000 today). The building's passageway into the Broadway-Spring Arcade was bricked closed in 2002. The building was shuttered in 2014, as the owner was unable to add a second exit that would increase occupancy beyond its one-exit limit of fifty. The owner attempted to reopen the Broadway-Spring Arcade passageway as this exit, but he and that building's owners were unable to make a deal.

In 2019, the building was put up for sale for $12 million ($15.1 million in 2025). An additional estimated $6 million in renovations would be required to prepare the building for occupancy.

== Architecture and design ==
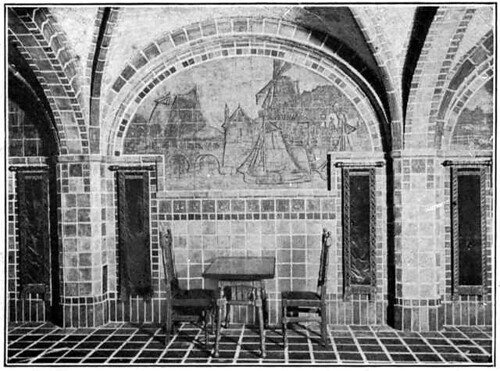
Wall mural and interior

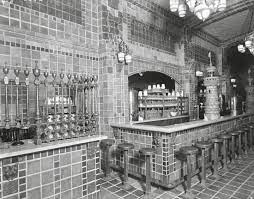
Bar

Finney's Cafeteria is made of brick and has a plain facade.

The ground-floor interior, redesigned after the building was constructed, has been described as "stunning," a "masterpiece," and "one of the most beautiful and extravagant tile interiors in Los Angeles or anywhere." Meant to resemble a German beer hall and featuring a Dutch motif, nearly every square inch of the ground-floor alcoves, windowless walls, groin vault ceiling, and floor is covered in handmade, custom 4-inch (10 cm) tile, with the walls also containing 21 mosaic-styled bas-relief murals, the largest of which is 6 feet (1.8 m) wide by 5 feet (1.5 m) tall. The tiles and murals were all done by Ernest A. Batchelder and his employees, with the murals being his first ever custom job and the entire project his largest commission. After installation, the tiles and murals were painted a chocolate color.

== In popular culture ==
Finney Cafeteria's tiled interior was featured in The Good Place, the Castle episode “The G.D.S.”, the 1918 film The Hope Chest, the 1980 film The Hunter, and the music video for Taylor Swift's Bad Blood featuring Kendrick Lamar.

== See also ==
- List of contributing properties in the Broadway Theater and Commercial District
- List of Los Angeles Historic-Cultural Monuments in Downtown Los Angeles
