= Stationers Building and Annex =

Former building in Los Angeles, California

- U.S. Historic district – Contributing property
- Location within the Los Angeles metropolitan area
- Location: 523-525 S. Spring Street, Los Angeles, California
- Coordinates: 34.04697°N 118.25027°W
- Built: 1913 (annex); 1922 (building)
- Architect: Parkinson and Bergstrom (annex); W. L. Schmolle (building)
- Demolished: after April 2005
- Part of: Spring Street Financial District (ID79000489)
- Designated CP: August 10, 1979

Stationers Building and Stationers Annex were historic buildings located at 523-525 S. Spring Street in downtown Los Angeles, California. They were contributing properties in the Spring Street Financial District and were demolished sometime after 2005.

== History ==
Stationers Annex was designed by Parkinson and Bergstrom for Realty Fireproof Company and built in 1913. Stationers Building was designed by W. L. Schmolle for the York Realty Company and built in 1922. Both were small scale loft buildings and were bought by the Stationers Corporation for use as a stockroom.

In 1979, the Spring Street Financial District was added to the National Register of Historic Places, with Stationers Building and Annex, the latter unnamed, listed as two different contributing properties in the district.

Stationers Building and Annex had several different owners after the Stationers Corporation. The buildings were continually modified and eventually little of their historic features remained. The buildings were vacated, then vandalism and water damage left them out of compliance with building and safety codes. The buildings were evaluated for demolition in 2004 and demolished sometime after April 2005.

In 2014, a 40-45 story, 360-unit residential tower was proposed for the site. Prior proposals for the site included a parking garage to serve Spring Street Arcade and a twelve-story mixed use development.

== Architecture and design ==
Stationers Building and Annex were three stories in height and made of reinforced concrete. The Annex was one of the narrowest buildings in the area.

Stationers Building featured a brick facade decorated with terra cotta detailing, while the Annex's original facade was replaced by a plain stucco facade. Both buildings originally had cornice, which was removed prior to 1979.

== See also ==
- List of contributing properties in the Spring Street Financial District
