= List of contributing properties in the Spring Street Financial District =

The properties on this list are contributing properties to Los Angeles's Spring Street Financial District, which was added to the National Register of Historic Places in 1979 and expanded in 2000.

Listed Name	Alternate Name	Image	Address	Type	Style	Architect	Year built	Additional information
Van Nuys Building	I. N. Van Nuys Building, Van Nuys Apartments		210 W. 7th St.	Office	Classical with Italianate details, Beaux Arts	Morgan, Walls & Morgan (1911), Morgan, Walls & Clements (1929)	1911, 1929	Residential conversion in late 1970s/early 1980s. LAHCM No. 898
Bartlett Building	Union Oil Building, A.G. Bartlett Building, The Bartlett		651 S. Spring St.	Financial and office	Commercial Style, Beaux Arts	Parkinson and Bergstrom	1911	Residential conversion in 2002. LAHCM No. 1089
Barclays Bank	Los Angeles Stock Exchange Building, Spring Tower Lofts		639 S. Spring St.	Financial and office	Neo-classical/Beaux Arts	Morgan, Walls and Morgan	1919	Residential conversion in 2001. LAHCM No. 671
California-Canadian Bank	California Bank Building, Premiere Towers		625 S. Spring St.	Office	Neo-Classical	Curlett and Beelman	1923	Residential conversion in 1981.
E. F. Hutton Building	Premiere Towers		623 S. Spring St.	Office	Zigzag Moderne	Parkinson and Parkinson	1931	Residential conversion in 1981.
Hotel Hayward	Hayward Manor		601 S. Spring St.	Hospitality	Commercial Style	Charles Frederick Whittlesey (1905), Richard D. King (1918), Parkinson and Parkinson (1925)	1905, 1918, 1925	Residential conversion in 1992.
Pacific Southwest Bank	Pacific Southwest Trust and Savings Bank, First National Trust & Savings Bank, SB Manhattan		NW 6th and Spring St.	Office	Classical Style	Parkinson and Bergstrom	1910	Residential conversion in 2007.
Spring Arcade Building	Broadway-Spring Arcade		541 S. Spring St.	Office and retail	Spanish Renaissance and Beaux Arts	Kenneth A. MacDonald Jr.	1924	Also contributes to the Broadway Theater and Commercial District. Residential conversion in 2010.
Stationers Building			525 S. Spring St.	Retail and loft		W. L. Schmolle	1922	Demolished after 2005
Unnamed Building	Stationers Annex		523 S. Spring St.	Loft		Parkinson and Bergstrom		Demolished after 2005
Alexandria Hotel			210 W. 5th St.	Hospitality	Beaux Arts	John Parkinson (1906), Parkinson and Bergstrom (1911)	1906, 1911	Residential conversion in 2005. LAHCM No. 80
Crocker Bank	Crocker Citizens National Bank Building, Citizens National Bank Building, Spring Arts Tower		453 S. Spring St.	Financial and office		Parkinson and Bergstrom	1914	
Title Insurance Building	Title Insurance & Trust Company Building, Design Center of Los Angeles, The Queen of Spring Street, UCLA Downtown		433 S. Spring St.	Office	Zigzag Moderne	Parkinson and Parkinson	1928	LAHCM No. 385
Banco Popular	Hellman Building, Herman W. Hellman Building, Banco Popular de Puerto Rico		NE 4th and Spring St.	Office	Commercial Style, Beaux Arts	Alfred Rosenheim	1903	Residential conversion in 2016.
Continental Building	Braly Block, Braly Building, Union Trust Building, Hibernian Building, California Reserve Building, Old Bank District Apartments		408 S. Spring St.	Office	Beaux Arts	John Parkinson	1902–1904	Residential conversion in 2001. LAHCM No. 730
Hellman Annex	Isaias W. Hellman Building		410 S. Spring St.	Office	Beaux Arts	Morgan & Walls (pre-1913), Morgan, Walls & Morgan (1913–1914)	1913	The annex was included in the district in 1979; the rest of the building was added in 2000. LAHCM No. 729; Surrounds Farmers and Merchants Bank Building.
Hellman Building	Isaias W. Hellman Building		405–11 S. Main St., 110–14 and 118–24 W. 4th Street, 410–12 S. Spring St.	Office	Beaux Arts	Morgan & Walls (pre-1913), Morgan, Walls & Morgan (1913–1914)	1905–1914	The annex was included in the district in 1979; the rest of the building was added in 2000. LAHCM No. 729; Surrounds Farmers and Merchants Bank Building.
Farmers and Merchants Bank Building			401 S. Main St.	Financial	Neo-Classical	Morgan & Walls	1905	Added in 2000.
El Dorado Hotel	Hotel Stowell, El Dorado Lofts		416 S. Spring St.	Hospitality	Art Nouveau/Gothic Revival	Frederick Buckley Noonan	1913	Residential conversion 2008–2011. LAHCM No. 1029
Rowan Building	Title Insurance Building, Rowan Building Lofts		131 W. 5th St.	Office	Commercial Style, Beaux Arts	Parkinson and Bergstrom	1910	Residential conversion in 2008.
Security Building	Security Trust and Savings Building, Lofts at the Security Building		510 S. Spring St.	Office	Beaux Arts	Parkinson and Bergstrom	1906	Residential converstion in 2006. LAHCM No. 741
President Trading Company	Security National Bank Building, Los Angeles Theater Center		514 S. Spring St.	Financial	Greek Revival	John Parkinson	1916	Performing arts conversion in 1985.
Lloyd's Bank	Merchant's National Bank Building, Farmers and Merchants Bank of Los Angeles, SB Lofts, Marley Lofts		548 S. Spring St.	Office	Commercial Style, Beaux Arts	William Curlett & Son	1913	Residential conversion in 2007.
Pacific Stock Exchange	Los Angeles Stock Exchange Building		618 S. Spring St.	Financial	Moderne	Samuel Lunden, Parkinson & Parkinson	1929	LAHCM No. 205
Mortgage Guarantee Building	The Sassony, City Lofts		626 S. Spring St.	Office	Beaux Arts		c. 1913	Residential conversion in 2004.
Banks & Huntley Building			632 S. Spring St.	Office	Moderne	Parkinson and Parkinson	1930	LAHCM No. 631
Bank of America Building	Hellman Bank Building, Hellman Commercial Trust and Savings Bank Building, SB Spring		117 W. 7th St.	Financial	Sullivanesque, Beaux Arts	Schultze & Weaver	1924	Residential conversion in 2006
Financial Center Building			704 S. Spring St.	Financial/office	Commercial Style, Beaux Arts	Norton and Wallis	1923	
