= Sassony Building =

Sassony Building may refer to:

- Barker Brothers Building, also known as Sassony Building, in Los Angeles, California
- Mortgage Guarantee Building, also known as The Sassony, in Los Angeles, California
