= Sears, Roebuck & Company Mail Order Building (Los Angeles, California) =

- Sears, Roebuck & Company; Mail Order Building
- U.S. National Register of Historic Places
- Los Angeles Historic-Cultural Monument
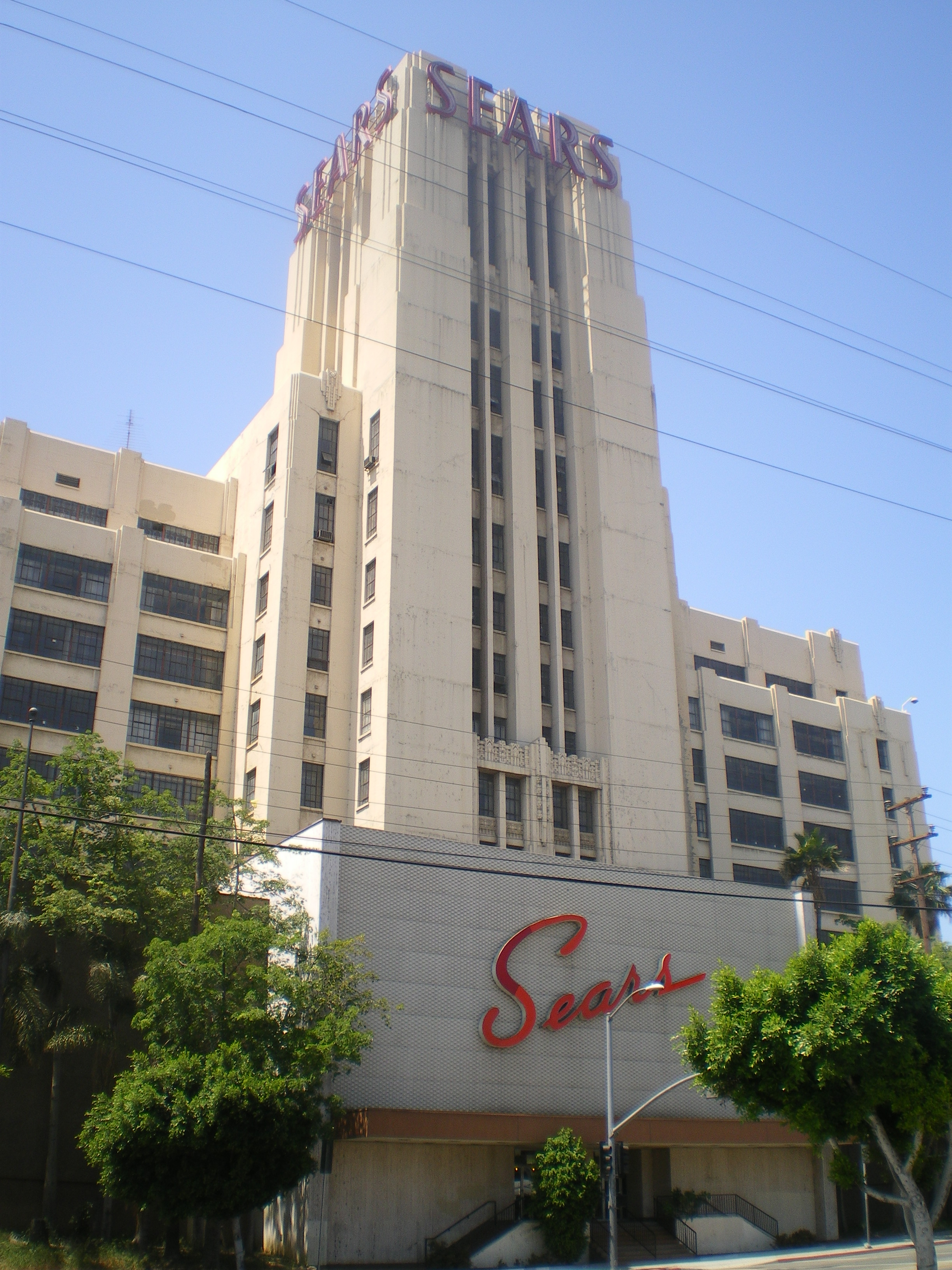
- Sears, Roebuck & Company Mail Order Building, May 2008

- Location within the Los Angeles metropolitan area Location within California Location within the United States
- Location: 2650 E. Olympic Blvd., Los Angeles, California
- Coordinates: 34°1′24″N 118°13′15″W
- Built: 1927
- Architect: Nimmons, George C.,
- Architectural style: Art Deco
- NRHP reference No.: 05001407
- LAHCM No.: 788

Significant dates
- Added to NRHP: April 21, 2006
- Designated LAHCM: 2004

The Sears, Roebuck & Company Mail Order Building is a historic landmark in Boyle Heights, Los Angeles, California. It served as a product distribution center and mail order facility for Sears, Roebuck & Company, with a retail store on the ground floor.

The building was used for mail order until 1992, when Sears closed the distribution center and sold the building. While Sears still operated a retail store on the ground floor until 2021, the rest of the enormous complex remained vacant. The 1,800,000-square-foot (170,000 m^{2}) complex has been the subject of several renovation proposals since the mid-1990s.

== Construction and architecture ==
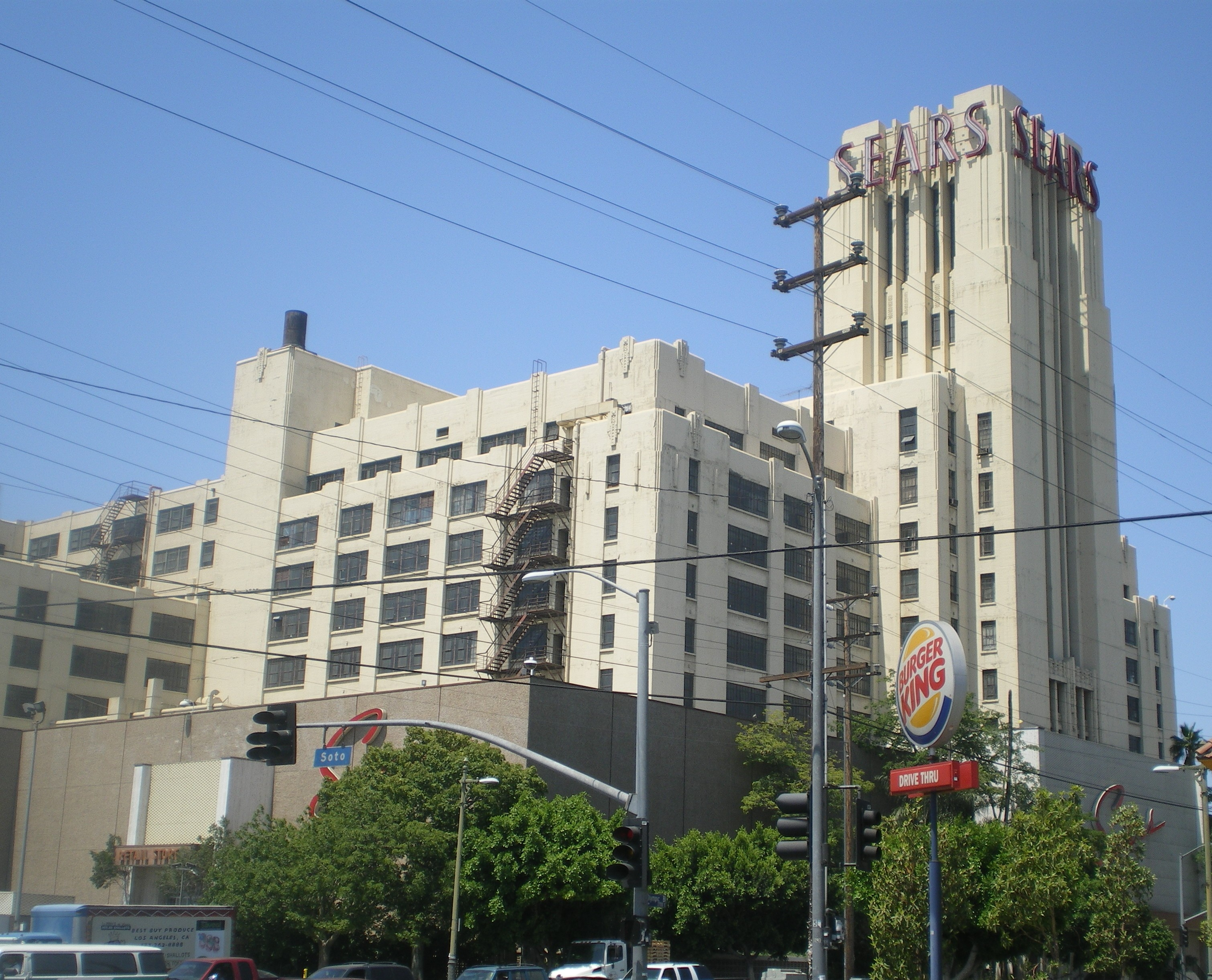
Side view

In December 1926, Sears, Roebuck & Company of Chicago announced that it would build a nine-story, height-limit building on East Ninth Street (later renamed Olympic Boulevard) at Soto Street to be the mail-order distribution center for the Rocky Mountain and Pacific Coast states, to be constructed by Scofield Engineering Company. Architectural work was handled by George Nimmens Company.

The building was erected in six months, using materials that were all made in Los Angeles County, with the exception of the steel window sashes. To accomplish the feat, the contractor had six steam shovels and a large labor force working night and day shifts. It was reported that rock and sand for the cement work were being delivered to the site at the rate of twenty carloads daily. When the building was completed in late June 1927, the Los Angeles Times reported that:

"All records for the erection of a huge structure were believed to have been broken when last week the Scofield Engineering Construction Company turned over the new $5,000,000 department store and mail-order house at Ninth street and Boyle avenue to Sears, Roebuck & Co., having completed this height-limit project in 146 working days, or 171 days of elapsed time."

The building had nine stories and a basement, with a total floor area of approximately 11 acres (45,000 m^{2}). The building was one of nine Sears mail-order distribution centers built between 1910 and 1929.

== Operation ==
The sprawling distribution center was a marvel of technology when it opened; employees filled orders by roller-skating around the facility, picking up items and dropping them onto corkscrew slides for distribution by truck or rail. The building was one of the largest in Los Angeles, and it attracted more than 100,000 visitors in its first month of operation, not including shoppers at the ground-floor retail store.

Over the years, the building's 226-foot (69 m) Art Deco tower and "Sears" sign became a "beacon for Eastsiders returning home on area freeways," and has been described by the Los Angeles Conservancy as "one of the dominant visual icons of the Eastside" of Los Angeles.

== Closure ==
The distribution center was closed in January 1992, eliminating jobs for 585 full-time workers and 775 part-timers.

The facility's general manager Francisco Medina said at the time that the Boyle Heights center was the least expensive that Sears operated, partly because of their 99-year lease contract.

In late January 2021, Sears announced the store would be closing on their jobs website. The store closed in April 2021, after nearly 94 years of operation.

== Redevelopment proposals ==
In 2004, developer MJW Investments announced it had acquired the building and would make it the centerpiece of a proposed $350 million (~$555 million in 2024), 23-acre (93,000 m^{2}) retail and residential redevelopment project. MJW planned to convert the Sears building into 480 condominiums, 180 apartments, and 750,000 square feet (70,000 m^{2}) of stores and restaurants.

The planned redevelopment was met with resistance in the Boyle Heights community. Many feared the development could spawn a gentrification of the area, squeezing out low-income housing. Others complained that the proposal for 150 affordable housing units was not enough and not the right kind. Others expressed concern that the large retail development would damage small businesses with roots in the community. In May 2006, MJW announced that, despite having paid $40 million for the building and investing another $10 million in the project, it would put the building up for sale.

Boyle Heights native and boxer Oscar De La Hoya, who said he used to shop as a child at the Boyle Heights Sears store with his mother, tried to revive the redevelopment effort. De la Hoya, with investment from other developers, made bids to acquire the property in 2007 and again in 2008, but no deal was consummated.

Weinstein sold the property in 2013 to Izek Shomof, who announced plans "to bring it back to life, perhaps with housing, offices and stores." In 2022, he publicly announced a proposal to turn it into the Life Rebuilding Center.

== Historic designation ==
The building was designated a Historic-Cultural Monument (HCM #788) by the Los Angeles Cultural Heritage Commission in August 2004, and was listed in the National Register of Historic Places in April 2006.

== See also ==
- Los Angeles Historic-Cultural Monuments on the East and Northeast Sides
- National Register of Historic Places listings in Los Angeles

Other adaptively reused Sears warehouses:

- Ponce City Market, Atlanta
- Landmark Center (Boston)
- Homan Square, Chicago
- Southside on Lamar, Dallas
- Park Lofts, North Kansas City
- Crosstown Concourse, Memphis
- Midtown Exchange, Minneapolis
- Starbucks Center, Seattle
