= Salvatore Cartaino Scarpitta =

Italian-American sculptor (1887–1948)

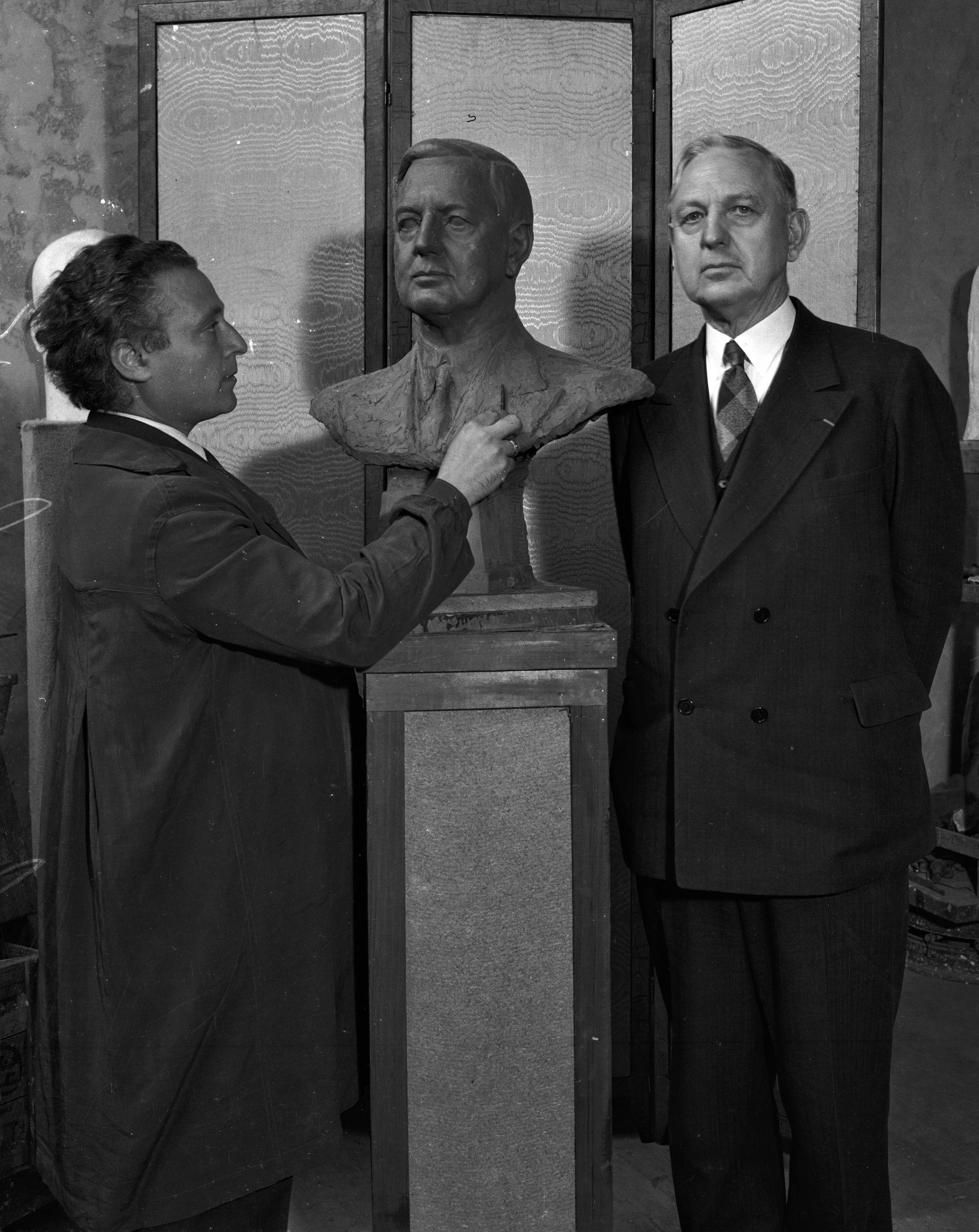
Scarpitta (left) working on a bust of John Clinton Porter

Gaetana Salvatore Cartaino Scarpitta (February 28, 1887 – August 18, 1948) was an Italian-American sculptor noted for busts of notable people, including Benito Mussolini, as well as large-scale bas-reliefs such as that on the Los Angeles Stock Exchange Building.

Born in Palermo, Italy, and educated at the Royal Italian Academy, he immigrated to New York City in 1910, relocating to Los Angeles in 1923, where he died in 1948.
