= Spring Street School =

First public school in Los Angeles, California, United States

Coordinates: 34°2′49″N 118°15′3″W

Spring Street School was the first public school in Los Angeles, California, built first at Second and Spring streets and then moved to a lot between Broadway and Spring Street midblock between Fifth and Sixth streets in the Downtown district.

== Campuses ==
=== Second and Spring ===
Spring Street School was the first public school in the city of Los Angeles. It was constructed at Second and Spring streets, where the longtime Los Angeles Times building now stands.

In 1873 this school housed a hundred pupils and one teacher; in the five schools in Los Angeles there were 14 teachers and 835 pupils, or 60 children per teacher. Two years later it was noted that the school was "running a double set of scholars, one class filling the rooms in the morning, and the other class receiving instruction in the afternoon."

Mrs. F.A. Parker, the school's only teacher, complained to the school board about her workload in January 1876, stating that two teachers "were allowed in accordance with the law." She said she was teaching "a double number of scholars, and that she acted as Janitor and washed her own towels." She was paid $80 a month and wanted a raise to $100. Superintendent W.T. Lucky told the board that Spring Street was "a hard school."

In 1875, the Los Angeles Herald opined that "The play-grounds of the Spring street school are a disgrace to the School Board. No flowers, no grass, but only unsightly grounds covered with rubbish and old school furniture."

Six years later, the school board appointed a committee of two medical doctors, R.W. Ellis and Walter Lindley, to examine the school. Their report concluded, among other things:

The grounds are . . . so low that the water stands on them and through its stagnancy is a rich source of miasm. . . . The privies are not connected to any sewer. The filth in the vaults . . . is now accumulating and permeating the atmosphere with its poisonous vapors. The school building is old. A portion of it fell down a few years ago and was repaired, but great cracks yet remain in it.

There are two rooms on the first floor. The largest one is occupied by a teacher who has one hundred and forty pupils. [Italics in the original.] She teaches about ninety of them in the morning and fifty in the afternoon. . . . We were not surprised that the teacher, having an ominous cough, had left for the balance of the school year. . . . We go up stairs by a very narrow flight of steps on the outside of the house. Here we find the worst school room we have been in, ceiling very low, atmosphere very depressing. . . . when the little children sent through an exhilarating exercise the building swayed to and fro.

=== Broadway-Spring ===
In 1883, the school board purchased a parcel of land adjoining both Broadway and Spring Street, midblock between Fifth and Sixth streets (the present site of the Broadway-Spring Arcade), for $12,500, and a new Spring Street School was built there. The more commodious structure hosted gatherings of educators and parents, it had an auditorium used by the public and it was the home of special education for "deaf-and-dumb" children, with the "oral method or lip-reading system" as the method of instruction.

In January 1914, the school hoisted two U.S. flags, one on the Spring Street side of the campus and one on the "Broadway front," noted as "an exceptional event in the school's annals. . . . Perhaps that which elicited the most comment was the flag presentation, made by Melville Mathels, a boy born deaf, and who was once dumb. Careful instruction and natural intelligence, however, have taught him to properly manipulate the vocal organs whose sound he can never hear."

In April 1887, the Times noted that "great discomfort" was occasioned during a teachers' convention when 250 adults were crowded into "three rooms, each designed for only fifty pupils." By 1899, however, the school was in good enough condition that it was able to host an educational exhibit on both of its floors, in conjunction with the annual convention of the National Education Association held that year in Los Angeles.

== Lease and sale ==
By 1904 the Broadway-Spring real estate had become so valuable that the school board decided to put the land up for lease but to retain the material in the old brick schoolhouse, which by then was noted to be a "landmark." As a result, in that year work began on Mercantile Place—what was planned to be "something entirely new in Los Angeles development"—a private shopping street under the aegis of C. Westley Roberts, who secured a ten-year lease from the Los Angeles School Board and bought the material of the old brick school building, which was to be demolished.

As the ten-year anniversary of the lease approached in 1913, school board members realized that the value of the property had increased from $400,000 to $1 million, which meant that the rental charged to the Mercantile Place lessee was amounting to only 2.5% a year on the valuation. A move was begun to sell the property instead of renewing the lease, and in February 1914 the board signed a renewable lease with the Mercantile Improvement Association for $3,500 a month "in order that the property may not be empty pending the sale of the property or the erection of a building thereon." The next month a special referendum election was held to ask voters what they wanted to do with the property, and in a lightly attended response 2,003 votes were cast for "lease for fifty years," 1,478 for "sell" and 931 for "neither sell nor lease for fifty years."

The school board sold the property for $1.155 million in 1919 to Adolph Ramish, president of the Hippodrome Theater Company
