= Banks & Huntley Building =

Building in Los Angeles, California

- U.S. Historic district – Contributing property
- Los Angeles Historic-Cultural Monument
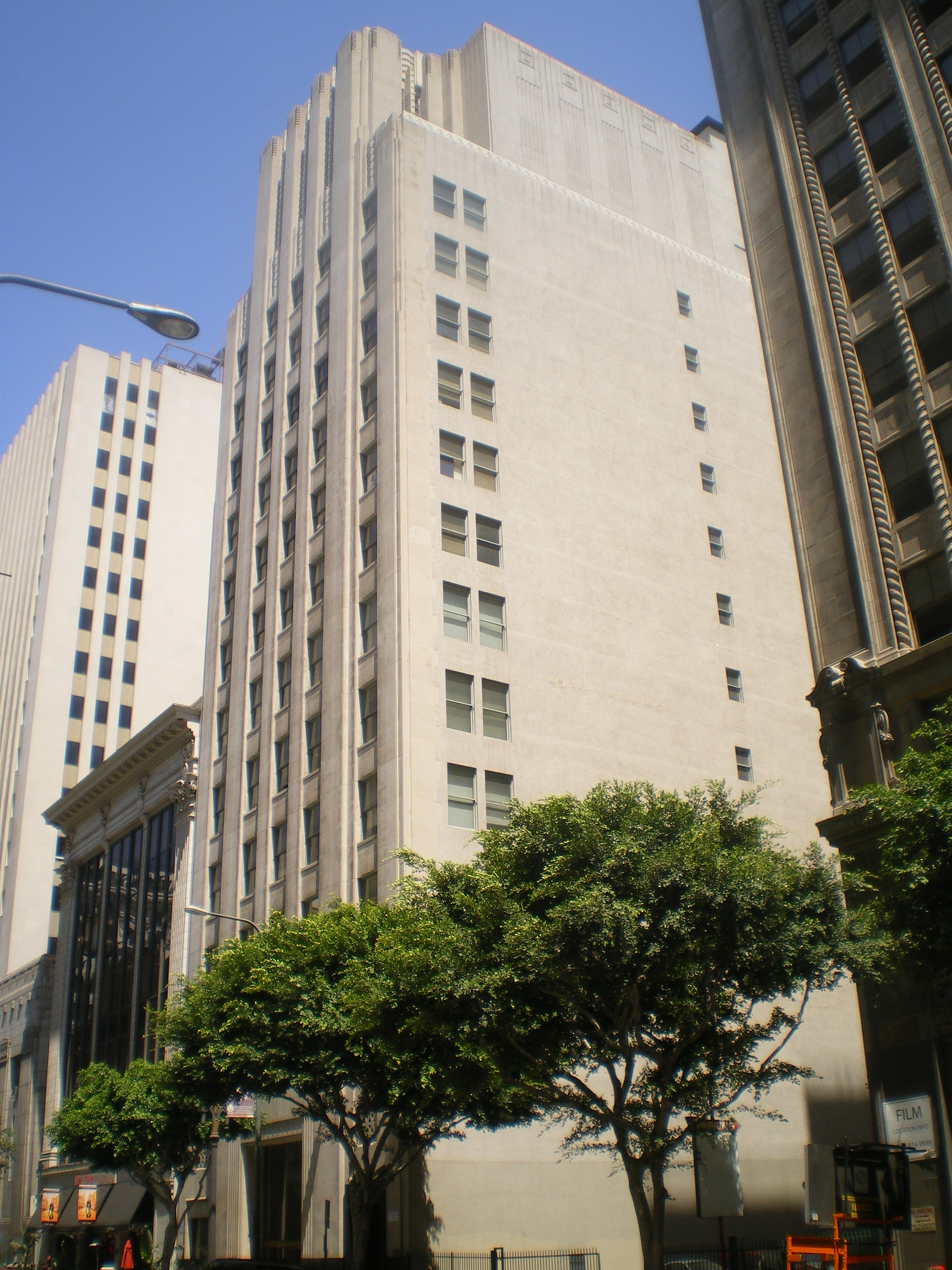
- The building in 2008

- Location within the Los Angeles metropolitan area
- Location: 632 S. Spring Street, Los Angeles, California
- Coordinates: 34.04517°N 118.25115°W
- Built: 1930
- Architect: Parkinson and Parkinson
- Architectural style: Art Deco
- Part of: Spring Street Financial District (ID79000489)
- LAHCM No.: 631

Significant dates
- Designated CP: August 10, 1979
- Designated LAHCM: January 14, 1997

Banks & Huntley Building is a historic building located at 632 S. Spring Street in downtown Los Angeles, California. It is a Los Angeles Historic Cultural Monument and a contributing property in the Spring Street Financial District.

== History ==
Banks & Huntley Building was designed by Parkinson and Parkinson and built in 1930. The building was the first in Los Angeles to have central heating and air conditioning. It was featured in Architectural Digest in 1931.

In 1979, the Spring Street Financial District was added to the National Register of Historic Places, with Banks & Huntley Building listed as a contributing property in the district. The building was declared Los Angeles Historic Cultural Monument No. 631 on January 14, 1997.

The Mexican American Legal Defense and Educational Fund moved into the building in 1984 and agreed to buy it for $8.5 million in 1991 ($20.1 million in 2025). The organization raised $6.2 million as of 1996. They also renovated the building and occupied the top two floors while renting out the floors underneath.

== Architecture and design ==
Banks & Huntley Building is a twelve story concrete office building that features an Art Deco design with Moderne styling. The building's upper facade is treated as a tower and features vertical panels of chevrons. The building as a whole has been described as "an Art Deco gem."

Inside, early pictures of the building show polished stone walls and floors, while the Los Angeles Times reported in 1996 that the walls were covered with polished wood paneling. The building also features decorative elevator doors and several of the building's ceilings feature colorful frescoes.

== See also ==
- List of contributing properties in the Spring Street Financial District
