= Izek Shomof =

American film producer (born 1959)

- אייזיק שומוף
- Born: 1959 or 1960 (age 66–67); Tel Aviv, Israel
- Occupation: Real estate developer
- Spouse: Aline Shomof
- Children: 5
- Parent(s): Hanan Shomof; Sara Shomof

Izek Shomof (born July 28, 1959) is an Israeli-born, American real estate developer, investor, one-time film producer and former restaurateur. Born in Tel Aviv, he dropped out of high school to open restaurants and an autoshop. Since the 1990s, he has restored many historic buildings in Downtown Los Angeles. He has been honored for his philanthropic work in reducing homelessness in Los Angeles.

== Early life ==
Izek Shomof was born July 28, 1959, in Tel Aviv, Israel. His parents, Hanana and Sara Shomof, owned a bar in Tel Aviv until they emigrated to Los Angeles, California, in 1973. His brother, Jacob, owned a restaurant in Los Angeles.

Shomof went to high school in Hollywood from 14 to 16, when he dropped out.

== Career ==
After working in his brother's restaurant, Shomof opened his own restaurant, Tony's Burger, in Downtown Los Angeles, at 16. By the age of 18, he had owned three restaurants, and he opened an autoshop on Pico Boulevard called Star Auto Body.

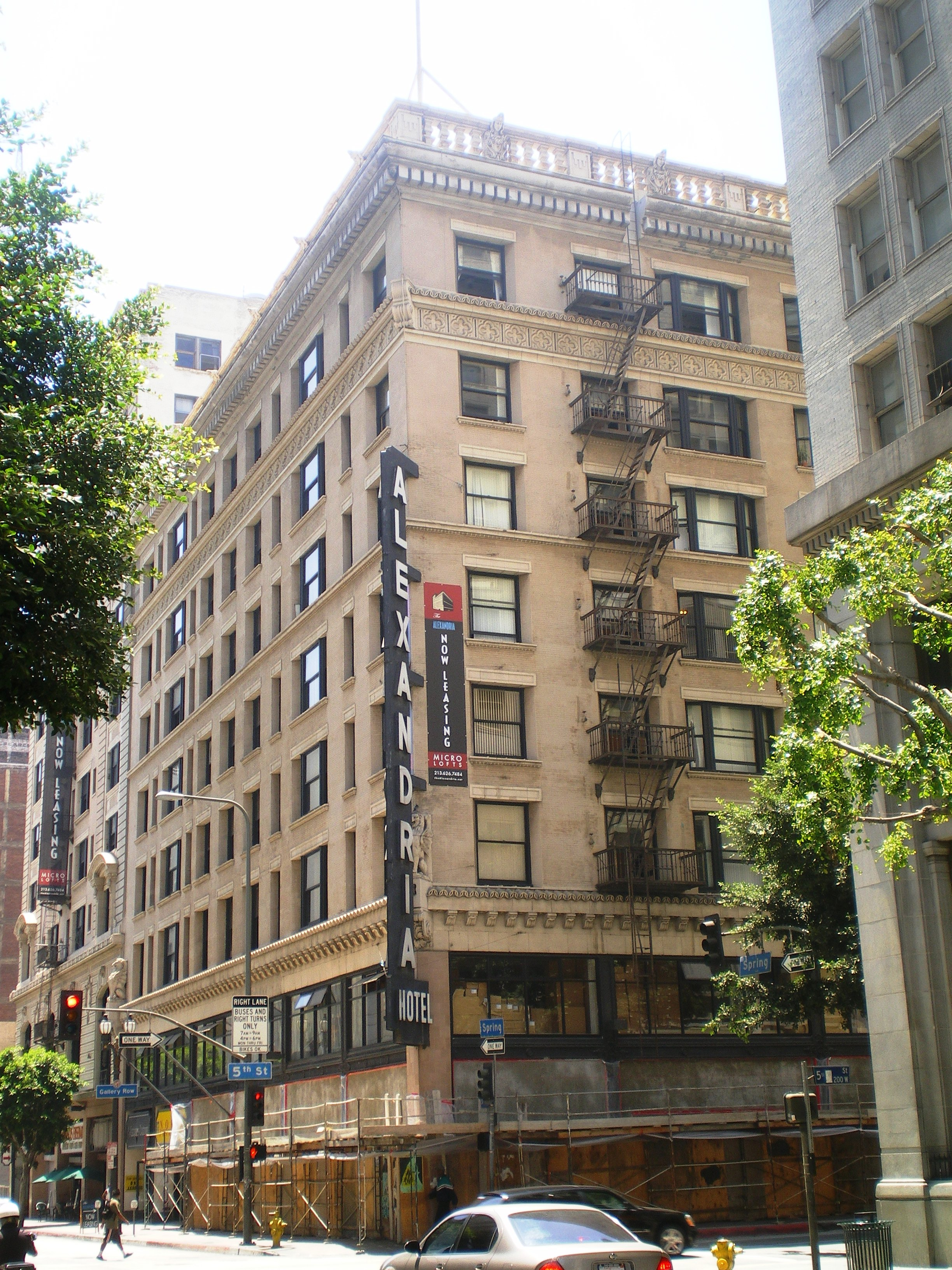
The Hotel Alexandria in Downtown Los Angeles, prior to its restoration.

Shomof purchased Spring Tower Lofts located at 639 South Spring Street in the Spring Street Financial District of Downtown Los Angeles for US$1 million in 1991. and brought his 2 brothers in as partners one of them being Izek. Izek later converted it in 2000 to 36 lofts being first to use the adaptive reuse ordinance. Meanwhile, he also acquired and restored the Premiere Towers at 621 South Spring Street.

As an investor, Shomof acquired the Leland Hotel, King Edward Hotel, Hotel Alexandria, Baltimore Hotel in 2012. Additionally, he acquired the Hayward Hotel, City Lofts, The Corporation Building, property in Chinatown, and other office/retail buildings throughout Los Angeles.

Shomof produced For the Love of Money, a crime film starring James Caan, Jeffrey Tambor and Edward Furlong, in 2012.

In 2013, Shomof purchased the Sears, Roebuck & Company Mail Order Building in Boyle Heights, Los Angeles for US$29 million from Mark Weinstein, another developer. Shomof expressed his intention to transform the building to 1,030 apartments, 200,000SF of creative office and 100,000SF of retail shopping/restaurants.

Shomof secured entitlements for a 34-story tower at 4th and Broadway, and subsequently sold the site to SCG America, a subsidiary of Shanghai Construction Group, for $32 million in 2015.

Shomof purchased the Rialto Theatre in South Pasadena, California, in 2015. Additionally, he made a US$80 million bid on the Revel Atlantic City in Atlantic City, New Jersey.

== Philanthropy ==
Shomof believes homelessness must end on Skid Row, as it is "inhumane". With his business partner Leo Pustilnikov, Shomof was honored by the LAMP Community, a non-profit organization which aims to prevent homelessness in Los Angeles, in 2015.

== Personal life ==
Shomof has a wife, Aline, and five children. They reside in Beverly Hills, California. He collects cars, and has over 100 cars in his collection ranging from old American Muscle to brand-new exotic supercars. Shomof owns a Ford GT 40 signed by Carroll Shelby and a newer Ford GT.
