= Ernest A. Batchelder =

American artist and educator

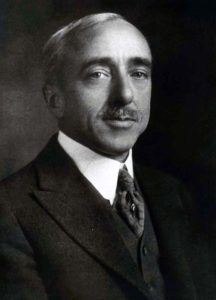
- Batchelder c. 1918
- Born: January 22, 1875; Nashua, New Hampshire, U.S.
- Died: August 6, 1957 (aged 82); Pasadena, California, U.S.
- Education: Massachusetts Normal Art School
- Known for: tile
- Movement: Arts and crafts

Ernest Allan Batchelder (January 22, 1875 – August 6, 1957) was an American artist and educator who lived in Southern California in the early 20th century. He created art tiles and was a leader in the American Arts and Crafts Movement.

== Early life ==
Ernest Allan Batchelder was born on January 22, 1875, in Nashua, New Hampshire. In 1894, he began attending classes at Massachusetts Normal Art School, and in 1899, he received his Public School Class diploma. Batchelder moved to Pasadena, California to teach in the early 1900s, and became director of the art department at Throop Polytechnic Institute, the predecessor of the California Institute of Technology.

== Career ==
In 1909 Batchelder built a kiln behind his house and began creating hand-crafted art tiles. The tiles were hugely popular, and by the 1920s, they could be found in homes and buildings across the United States. Due to the success of Batchelder's tiles his company moved twice, expanding each time.

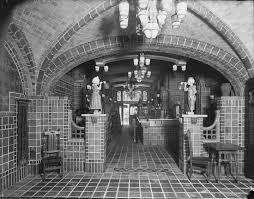
Dutch Chocolate Shop in the 1910s

One of Batchelder's earliest and most notable commissions was a Dutch-themed Chocolate Shop, in which the walls were crowned with tiles of Dutch maidens, wooden clogs, and windmills. The entire work has been called "one of the most beautiful and extravagant tile interiors in Los Angeles or anywhere." One of Batchelder's last and largest projects was Hotel Hershey in Hershey, Pennsylvania. Batchelder tiles were used on the walls, floors, and stair risers of the building's fountain room, complete with central pool and a mezzanine level.

Batchelder's company, which employed 150 men at its peak, went out of business in 1932. Batchelder, however, continued making pottery until the early 1950s.

=== Books ===
Batchelder wrote two books on tile design: The Principal of Design (1901) and Design in Theory and Practice (1911).

== Technique and style ==
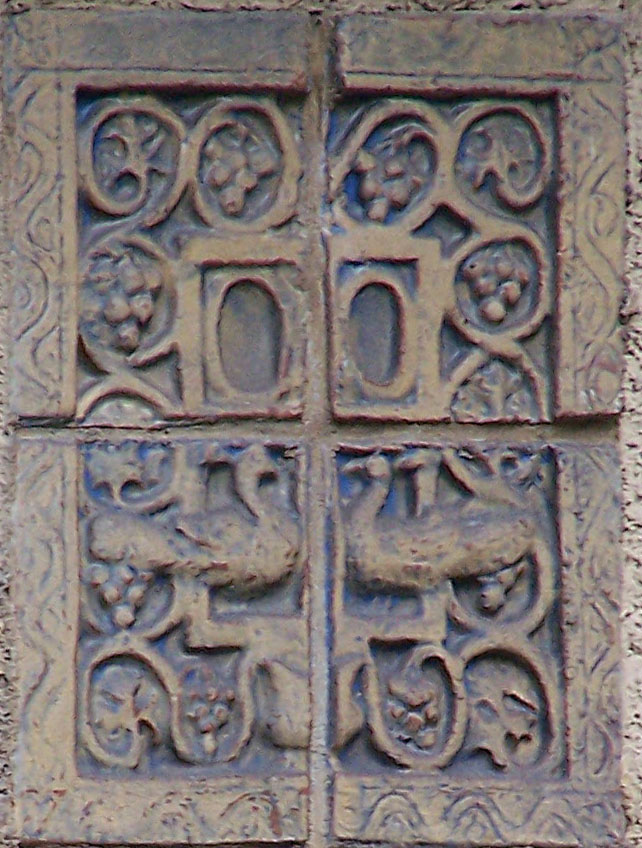
Batchelder tile, detail on chimney of the Batchelder House

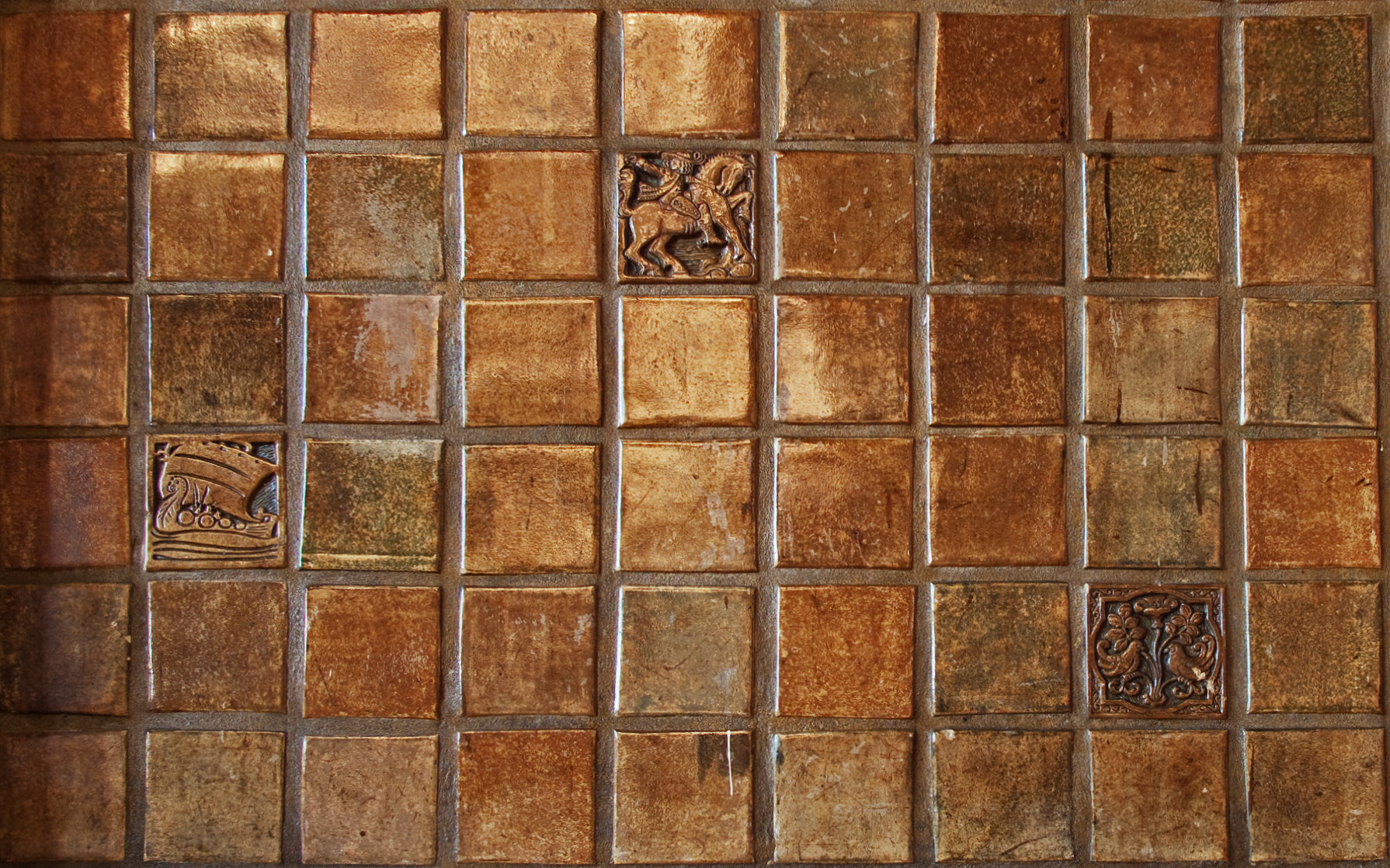
Batchelder art tiles in the wainscotting of the Social Hall, Hollywood YMCA, Los Angeles, California

Batchelder used a single-fire process known as engobe, in which a primary wash of colored clay slip (usually pale blue) was applied to the tile's surface before being fired, allowing it to pool in the recesses of the design. Then the tile was fired. A typical glazed tile is fired twice–once before glaze, and once after, thereby sealing in the added color.

Batchelder's designs often drew on Medieval themes but also included flowers, vines, California oaks, birds (particularly peacocks), Mayan patterns, Byzantine themes, and geometric shapes.

== List of works ==
=== California ===
- Batchelder House (1910), Pasadena
- Dutch Chocolate Shop (1913), Los Angeles
- Hotel Stowell lobby (1913), Los Angeles
- Fine Arts Building (1927), Los Angeles
- Hollywood Art Center School fountain, Los Angeles
- Social Hall, Hollywood YMCA, Los Angeles
- numerous homes in the Pasadena area, many of which were lost in the Eaton Fire in 2025

=== Elsewhere ===
- Hotel Hershey, (1933), Hershey, Pennsylvania
- Our Lady of Victory Chapel, St. Paul, Minnesota
- numerous homes, shops, restaurants, swimming pools, lobbies, and hotels throughout the United States

== See also ==
- California pottery, tile
- Artists of the Arroyo Seco (Los Angeles)
