= California-Canadian Bank Building =

Historic structure in Los Angeles, California

- California-Canadian Bank
- U.S. Historic district – Contributing property
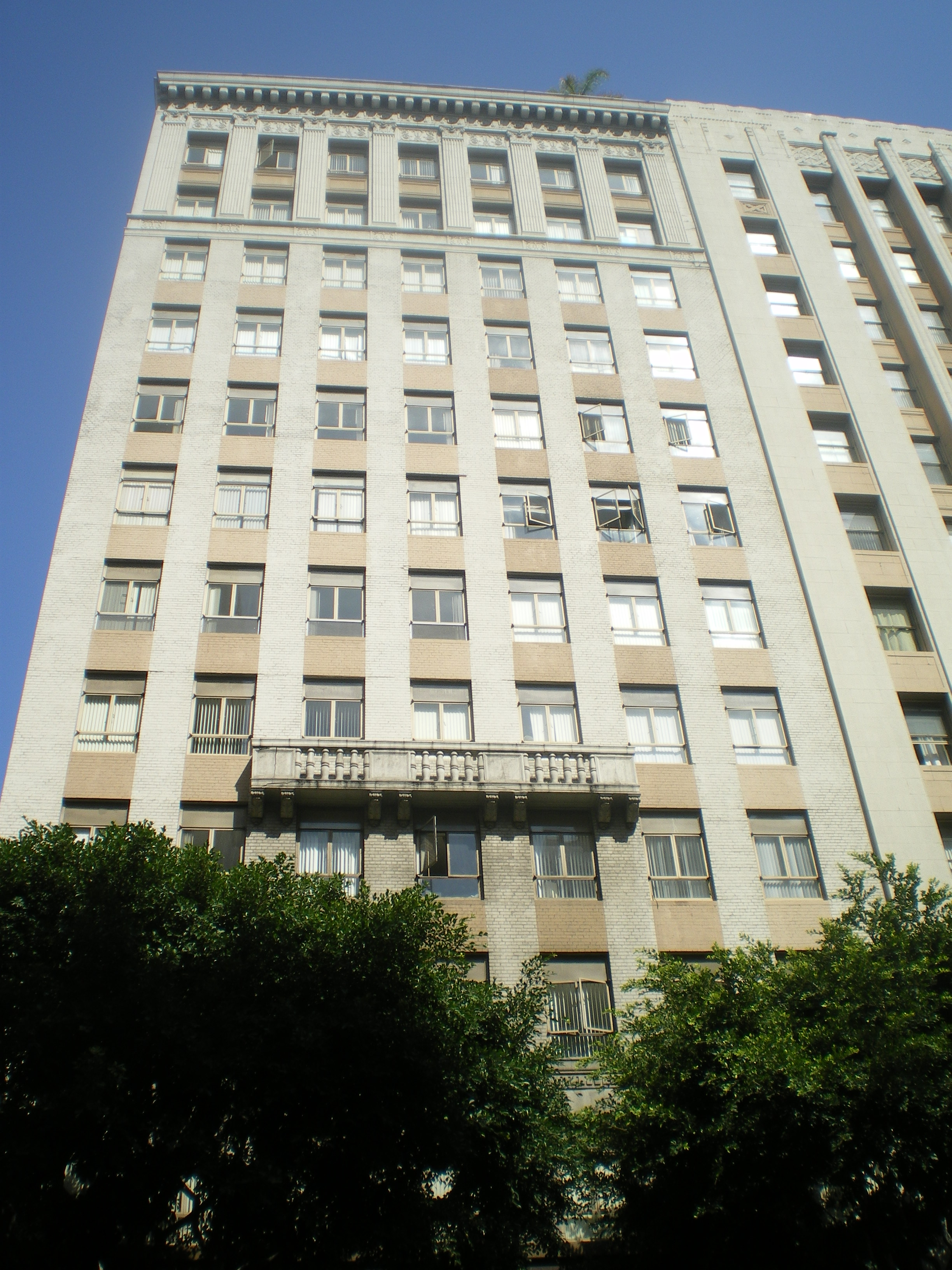
- The building in 2008

- Location within the Los Angeles metropolitan area
- Location: 625 S. Spring Street, Los Angeles, California
- Coordinates: 34.0457°N 118.2518°W
- Built: 1923
- Architect: Curlett and Beelman
- Architectural style: Neo-classical
- Part of: Spring Street Financial District (ID79000489)
- Designated CP: August 10, 1979

California-Canadian Bank, also known as California Bank Building and Premiere Towers, is a historic building located at 625 S. Spring Street in downtown Los Angeles, California. It is a contributing property in the Spring Street Financial District.

== History ==
California-Canadian Bank was designed by Curlett and Beelman and built in 1923. The building housed California Bank from its opening to the 1950s; Canadian Bank of Commerce moved into the building in 1961.

In 1979, the Spring Street Financial District was added to the National Register of Historic Places, with California-Canadian Bank listed as a contributing property in the district. In 1981, this building and neighboring E. F. Hutton Building became the first office buildings in the district to be converted into residences.

== Architecture and design ==
California-Canadian Bank is twelve stories and features a Neo-classical design with a brick and terra cotta facade and an entrance made of stone. The top two stories feature terra cotta ornament, and the building also features pilasters and decorative cornice. The building is 120 feet (37 m) deep and has a 60-foot (18 m) front on Spring Street.

The building was designed to reflect the growth and spirit of California Bank, and upon opening, it was described as "one of the most attractive" in Los Angeles. Originally, the entire ground floor was occupied by a banking room that was lit by large plate glass screens. The ground floor has since been modernized.

== See also ==
- List of contributing properties in the Spring Street Financial District
