= David Gebhard =

American architectural historian (1927–1996)

David Stanley Gebhard (21 July 1927 – 3 March 1996) was a leading architectural historian, particularly known for his books on the architecture and architects of California. He was a long-time faculty member at the University of California, Santa Barbara, and was dedicated to the preservation of Santa Barbara architecture. Gebhard was also known for his archaeological work recording and documenting the multiple styles of pictographs in the Lower Pecos Canyonlands on the border of Texas and Mexico.

== Early life ==
Gebhard was born in Cannon Falls, Minnesota, to Walter J. Gebhard (1895–1980), a well equipment manufacturer, and Ann K. Olson (1898–1978). Gebhard received his Ph.D. at the University of Minnesota in 1958. While finishing his doctorate, he served, for six years, as director of the Roswell Museum and Art Center in New Mexico, before moving to UC Santa Barbara in 1961.

== Career ==
As a teacher Gebhard inspired many students at both the undergraduate and graduate levels. In addition to his long teaching career, he served as director of the University Art Museum for twenty years, building a small gallery into a significant accredited university museum. In this position, he initiated the Architectural Drawings Collection, now one of the leading West Coast repositories for architectural materials. With Robert Winter he co-authored guides to architecture in northern and southern California.

In 1958, Gebhard, along with John Graham, W.A. Davis, and Edward B. Jelks, were hired to lead an archaeological survey in the Lower Pecos Canyonlands of Texas and Mexico prior to the construction of Lake Amistad. The National Park Service funded the Diablo Reservoir Rock Art Survey in which the crew documented over 200 archaeological sites. During the survey, he identified a new rock art style known as the "Red Linear style."

Gebhard was also active in service to his community, serving for many years on the Santa Barbara County Architectural Board of Review. He was active in the Society of Architectural Historians and served a term as its president in the 1980s.

== Death and legacy ==
Gebhard died on 3 March 1996 of a heart attack while bicycling near his house in Santa Barbara, California, which he had designed in 1967. The David Gebhard Memorial Lecture Series is an annual event sponsored by Pasadena Heritage, an architectural preservation organization in Pasadena, California.

== Selected publications ==
=== 1960s ===
- Prehistoric Paintings of the Diablo Region, A Preliminary Report, Roswell Museum and Art Center, Roswell NM 1960.
- A Guide to the Existing Buildings of Purcell and Elmslie, 1910–1920, Roswell Museum and Art Center, Roswell NM 1960.

=== 1970s ===
- Charles F. A. Voysey, Hennessey & Ingalls, Los Angeles 1975, ISBN 0-912158-54-9
- A Guide to the Architecture of Minnesota, University of Minnesota Press, Minneapolis MN 1977 (With Tom Martinson)
- The Guide to Architecture in Los Angeles and Southern California, Peregrine Smith, Santa Barbara 1977, ISBN 0-87905-049-7 (joint author)

=== 1980s ===
- Rudolf Schindler, Architect Viking Press, New York 1972, ISBN 0-670-62063-7 ; reprint Peregrine Smith, Santa Barbara 1980, ISBN 0-87905-077-2
- The Guide to Architecture in San Francisco and Northern California, Gibbs M. Smith Books, Salt Lake City 1985, ISBN 0-87905-202-3 (joint author)
- California Romanza: Frank Lloyd Wright in California, Chronicle Books, San Francisco 1988, ISBN 0-87701-379-9
- Los Angeles in the Thirties, 1931–1941, Peregrine Smith, Layton UT 1975, reprint Hennessey & Ingalls, Los Angeles 1989, ISBN 0-912158-98-0 (With Harriette Von Breton)
  - Woodbridge, Sally Byrne; Gebhard, David (1988). Bay Area Houses. Salt Lake City: Peregrine Smith Books. ISBN 9780879053062.

=== 1990s ===
- Lutah Maria Riggs: A Woman in Architecture, 1921–1980, Capra Press and the Santa Barbara Museum of Art, Santa Barbara 1992, ISBN 0-88496-352-7
- Buildings of Iowa, Oxford University Press, New York, 1993 (With Gerald Mansheim)
- Robert Stacy Judd: Maya Architecture, The Creation of a New Style, Capra Press, Santa Barbara 1993, ISBN 0-88496-351-9 (photos by Anthony Peres)
- The National Trust Guide to Art Deco in America, Wiley, New York; Preservation Press, Washington DC 1996, ISBN 0-471-14386-3
