= Hotel Stowell =

Building in Los Angeles, California

- U.S. Historic district – Contributing property
- Los Angeles Historic-Cultural Monument
- The building in 1913

- Location within the Los Angeles metropolitan area
- Location: 416 S. Spring Street, Los Angeles, California
- Coordinates: 34.0485°N 118.2485°W
- Built: 1913
- Architect: Frederick Buckley Noonan
- Architectural style: Art Nouveau/Gothic Revival
- Part of: Spring Street Financial District (ID79000489)
- LAHCM No.: 1029

Significant dates
- Designated CP: August 10, 1979
- Designated LAHCM: April 5, 2013

Hotel Stowell, later El Dorado Hotel and El Dorado Lofts, is a historic building located at 416 S. Spring Street in downtown Los Angeles, California. It is a Los Angeles Historic Cultural Monument and a contributing property in the Spring Street Financial District.

== History ==
Hotel Stowell was designed by Frederick Buckley Noonan for Nathan Wilson Stowell and built for about $400,000 in 1913 ($13 million in 2025). The hotel was the first in downtown Los Angeles to feature a bath with every room. Charlie Chaplin once lived in the building and c. 1940 rooms ranged from $1.50 ($34.47 in 2025) to $2.50 ($57.45 in 2025) per night.

Decades after opening, Stowell Hotel had devolved into a flophouse named El Dorado Hotel. In 1979, the Spring Street Financial District was added to the National Register of Historic Places, with El Dorado Hotel listed as a contributing property in the district.

The building was completely vacated in 1998. From 2008 to 2011, the building was converted into a 65-unit condominium complex and renamed El Dorado Lofts; it also underwent a seismic retrofit. The total cost of the conversion was $25.7 million ($36.8 million in 2025).

In 2013, the building was declared Los Angeles Historic Cultural Monument No. 1029. A French brasserie opened in the building's lobby in 2015.

== Architecture and design ==
Hotel Stowell is a twelve-story reinforced concrete building faced with terra cotta and enameled brick. The building features a Art Nouveau/Gothic Revival design with a brightly colored facade and extensive cantilevered canopies. Two neon signs extend from the second to tenth floors.

Inside, the building's former lobby features Ernest Batchelder tiles. These tiles, green in color, contrast with the building's light tan cast stone ornament.

== See also ==
- List of contributing properties in the Spring Street Financial District
