= Barclay's Bank Building (Los Angeles) =

Building in Los Angeles, California

- Barclay's Bank
- U.S. Historic district – Contributing property
- Los Angeles Historic-Cultural Monument
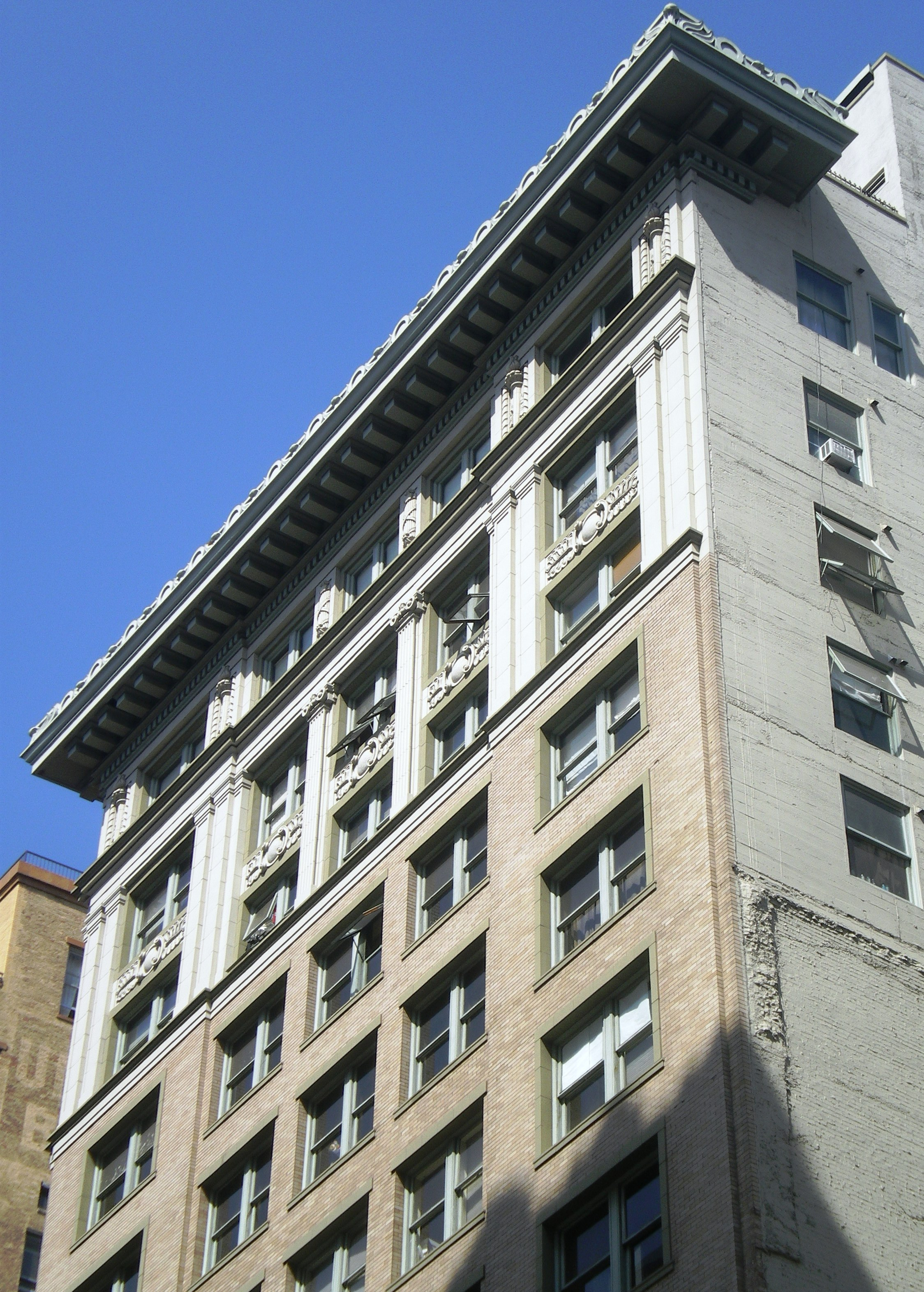
- The building in 2008

- Location within the Los Angeles metropolitan area
- Location: 639-641 S. Spring Street, Los Angeles, California
- Coordinates: 34.04534°N 118.25198°W
- Built: 1919
- Architect: Morgan, Walls and Morgan
- Architectural style: Neo-classical/Beaux Arts
- Part of: Spring Street Financial District (ID79000489)
- LAHCM No.: 671

Significant dates
- Designated CP: August 10, 1979
- Designated LAHCM: November 9, 1999

Barclay's Bank, also known as Los Angeles Stock Exchange Building and Spring Tower Lofts, is a historic building located at 639-641 S. Spring Street in downtown Los Angeles, California. It is a Los Angeles Historic Cultural Monument and a contributing property in the Spring Street Financial District.

== History ==
Barclay's Bank was designed by Morgan, Walls and Morgan and built jointly by T. Byron Story and Walter P. Story in 1919. The building was built to house the Los Angeles Stock Exchange, which took up two-thirds of the ground floor and opened in the building on September 6, 1921. Paul R. Williams also opened his first office in the building in 1922, and the building later served as headquarters for Barclay's Bank.

In 1979, the Spring Street Financial District was added to the National Register of Historic Places, with Van Nuys Building listed as a contributing property in the district. The building was declared Los Angeles Historic Cultural Monument No. 671 on November 9, 1999.

Developer Izek Shomof bought the building for $1.2 million in 1991 ($2.84 million in 2025). Eight years later, the building underwent $4.2 million in renovations, including a seismic retrofit. It re-opened as the residential Spring Tower Lofts in early 2001.

== Architecture and design ==
Barclay's Bank is 13 stories in height and made of reinforced concrete and brick with terra cotta detailing. It features a Neo-classical/Beaux Arts design and has a 70-foot (21 m) frontage on Spring Street.

Inside, the building originally contained 325 offices and now contains 36 lofts, the lofts featuring exposed brick, concrete beams, and 15-foot (4.6 m) ceilings. The ground floor space that originally housed the stock exchange features 24-foot (7.3 m) ceilings, skylights, and marble wainscoting.

== See also ==
- List of contributing properties in the Spring Street Financial District
