= Los Angeles Stock Exchange Building =

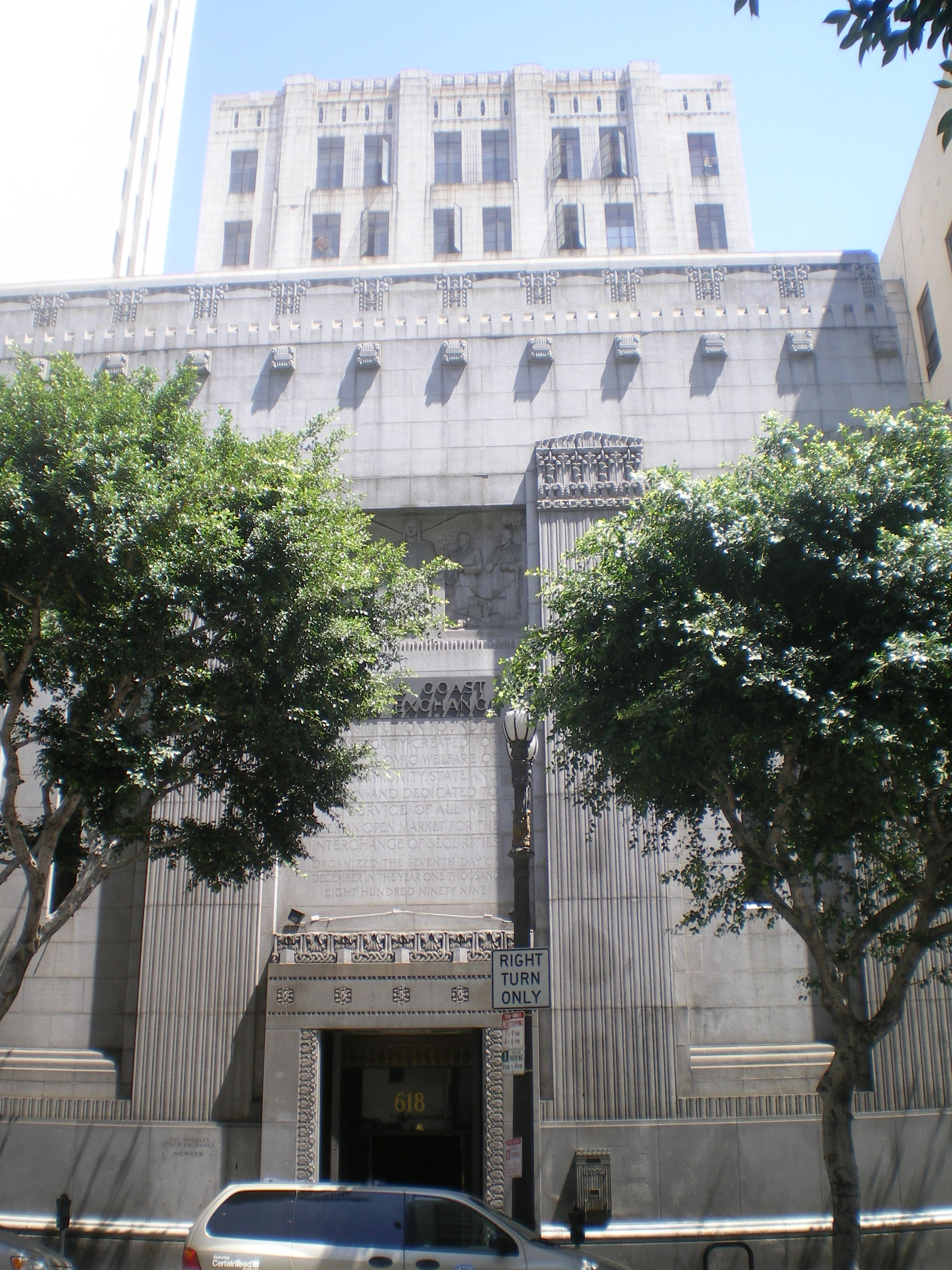
- Alternative names: Pacific Coast Stock Exchange building

General information
- Type: High-rise building
- Architectural style: Moderne
- Location: 618 Spring Street, Downtown Los Angeles, California, United States
- Coordinates: 34.0453°N 118.2512°W
- Construction started: October 1929
- Completed: 1931
- Opened: 1931
- Renovated: 2008–2010
- Cost: $1.75 million equivalent to $37,048,687 in 2025

Height
- Height: 177.5 feet (54.1 m)

Technical details
- Structural system: Steel
- Material: Granite façade and terra cotta office tower
- Floor count: 12
- Lifts/elevators: 3

Design and construction
- Architects: Samuel Lunden; Parkinson & Parkinson (consulting)
- Other designers: Julian Ellsworth Garnsey
- Designations: Los Angeles Historic-Cultural Monument (1979)
- Los Angeles Stock Exchange Building
- U.S. Historic district – Contributing property
- Part of: Spring Street Financial District (ID79000489)
- Designated CP: 1979

The historic Los Angeles Stock Exchange Building, also called the Pacific Stock Exchange Building, is located in the Spring Street Financial District within the Historic Core in Los Angeles. It was the headquarters of the Los Angeles Stock Exchange and the Pacific Stock Exchange from 1931 to 1986. It was then the site of two nightclubs.

The building was designated a Los Angeles Historic-Cultural Monument on January 3, 1979, and its façade is protected by the Los Angeles Conservancy.

== History ==
=== Building ===
External images
- Early Los Angeles Historical Buildings (1925 +), a number of historic images of the building
- Pacific Stock Exchange (former)

The Moderne style building, located at 618 Spring Street in Downtown Los Angeles, was designed to be imposing with a 53 feet (16 m) high granite façade with what were said to be the area's largest bronze doors and behind that a twelve-floor office tower. (Note: The history article by ExchangeLA said that it was built as an eleven story building.) Three bas-reliefs entitled Research and Discovery, Production and Finance were designed by Salvatore Cartaino Scarpitta to portray the societal benefit of the stock exchange business, using symbols like the bear and bull that reflect the fall and rising markets in Finance. It also reflects the importance of labor and science, a supportive role to the world of finance. The three works of art represent the roles of individuals, steelworkers at a factory for Production, research chemists in Research and Discovery, and financiers and a woman on a throne in Finance.

Julian Ellsworth Garnsey designed the interior with Native American and Near East styles. The trading floor were 64 booths and a balcony under a 40 feet (12 m) ceiling, which was decorated with sculptured figures. A figure with scales exemplifies Equality and one contemplating the universe represents Permanence. Two other figures were Mercury, which embodies Speed, and an archer for Accuracy. It was built with an auditorium, lecture room, and statistics department on the fifth floor. The next three floors above that are for offices. Floors ten and eleven were built with a library, club, billiard room, reading rooms, and a card room.

=== Stock exchange and nightclubs ===
This Los Angeles Stock Exchange building opened in 1931 and the company merged into the Pacific Coast Stock Exchange in 1956. It was incorporated as the Pacific Stock Exchange in 1973. It was the largest regional stock exchange west of the Mississippi.

In 1986, the exchange moved to another site. By the end of the decade, the Stock Exchange, a nightclub, opened in the renovated building. In 1988, the building was sold by the San Francisco Stock and Bond Exchange to William Dixon, John Wright, and the Empire Group for $2 million. At the time, the Pacific Stock Exchange leased office space in the building and had a trading floor in another location in Los Angeles.

In 2006, PAX America bought the building. It was renovated again for the nightclub ExchangeLA, which opened in 2010. Aside from the renovations, the building also had to be brought up to code, like work on the fire sprinkler system. The renovations and improvements cost about $5 million and took about two years to complete. The former trading floor was used for the venue, but the rest of the building does not appear to have been occupied. PAX America defaulted on settlements to reimburse the company that operated ExchangeLA for the cost of mandated improvements. Unpaid by PAX, the company filed for bankruptcy in 2013.

== In popular culture ==
The building has been featured in commercials, television shows, and the movies The Social Network (2010), The Big Lebowski (1998), and The Fantastic Four (1994).

== See also ==
- List of contributing properties in the Spring Street Financial District
- List of Los Angeles Historic-Cultural Monuments in Downtown Los Angeles
- Los Angeles Board of Trade Building
