= E. F. Hutton Building =

Building in Los Angeles, California

- U.S. Historic district – Contributing property
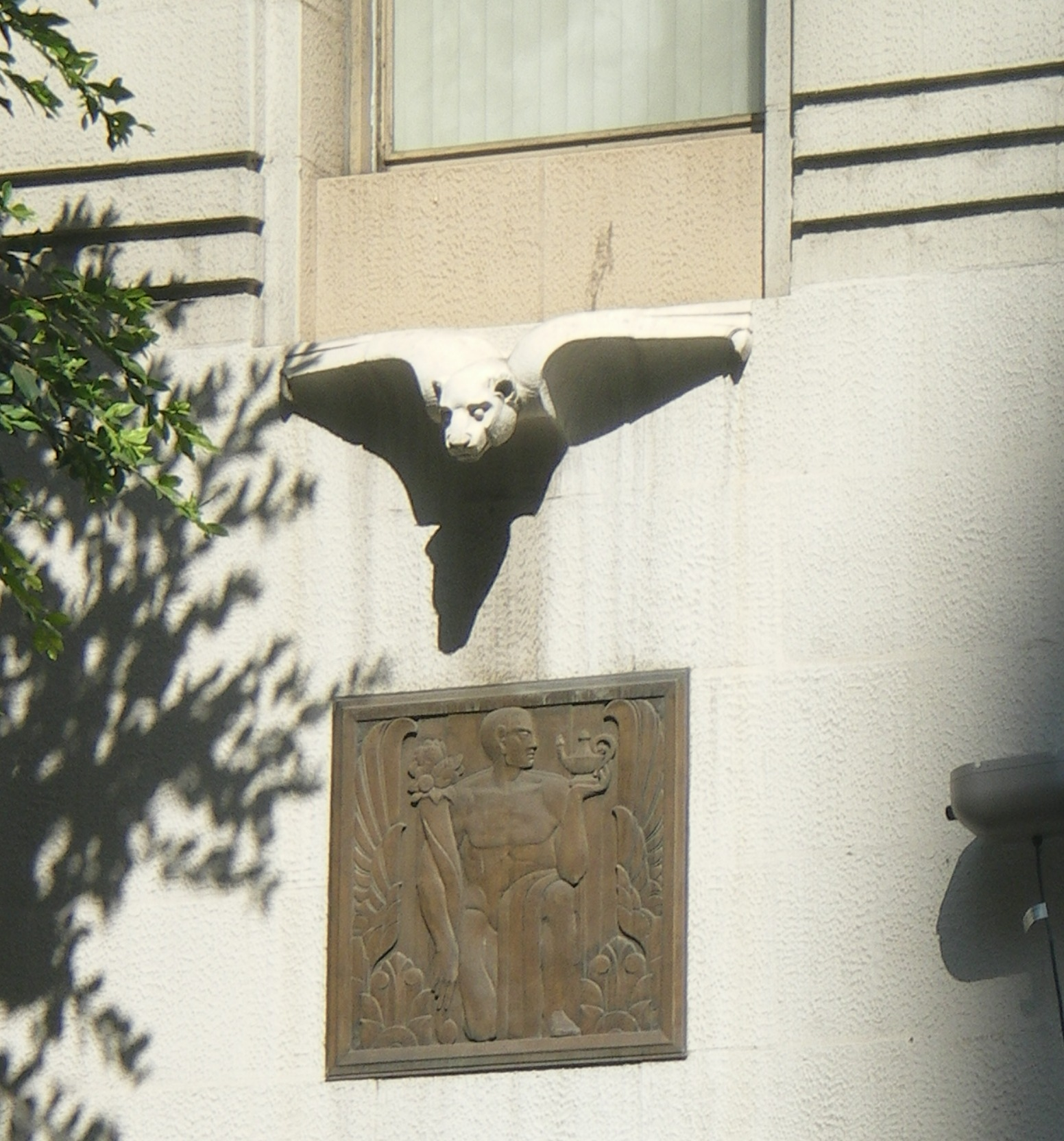
- Decoration above the entrance to the building, photographed in 2008

- Location within the Los Angeles metropolitan area
- Location: 623 S. Spring Street, Los Angeles, California
- Coordinates: 34.0457°N 118.2517°W
- Built: 1931
- Architect: Parkinson and Parkinson
- Architectural style: Zigzag Moderne
- Part of: Spring Street Financial District (ID79000489)
- Designated CP: August 10, 1979

E. F. Hutton Building, also known as Premiere Towers, is a historic building located at 623 S. Spring Street in downtown Los Angeles, California. It is a contributing property in the Spring Street Financial District.

== History ==
E. F. Hutton Building was designed by Parkinson and Parkinson and built 1931. The building housed E. F. Hutton & Company.

In 1979, the Spring Street Financial District was added to the National Register of Historic Places, with E. F. Hutton Building listed as a contributing property in the district.

In 1981, E. F. Hutton Building and neighboring California-Canadian Bank became the first office buildings in the district to be converted into residences.

== Architecture and design ==
E. F. Hutton Building is built of reinforced concrete and twelve stories in height. It features a Zigzag Moderne design with a facade that contains gargoyles, other figures, and continuous window columns.

== See also ==
- List of contributing properties in the Spring Street Financial District
