= Balcony Press =

Publisher

- Publisher: Ann Gray, FAIA, FRICS
- Founded: 1994
- Company: Balcony Media, Inc.
- Country: United States
- Based in: South Pasadena, CA
- Language: English

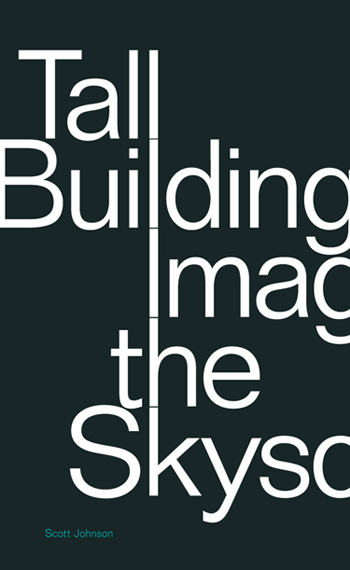
Cover of book published by Balcony Press. "Tall Building: Imagining the Skyscraper."

Balcony Press is a publisher established in 1994. The press has released art, architecture and design books emphasizing the cultural and historical aspects of design particularly in the western United States.

Publisher Ann Gray, herself an architect, has practiced architecture professionally for over 25 years. She is a Fellow of the American Institute of Architects and serves on the governing Council of the Royal Institution of Chartered Surveyors. The American Institute of Architects has awarded Ann Gray and Balcony Press the 1999 Institute Honor for Collaborative Achievement.

Balcony Press was the founding publisher of FORM: Pioneering Design Magazine, a design and building industry publication. FORM magazine was sold in 2018.

== Title sampling ==
- Scott Johnson, Tall Building: Imagining the Skyscraper. Balcony Press, 2009. ISBN 978-1-890449-47-6.
- Photographs-Meg McComb, Introduction-Mark Peel, Preface-Robert Harris, The Gamble House Cookbook: Good Design Good Food. Balcony Press, 2008. ISBN 978-1-890449-48-3.
- Photographs by Gil Garcetti, Essays by Kofi Annan, Jimmi Carter, Steven M. Hilton, Ellen Johnson-Sirleaf and Mary Robinson, Water Is Key: A Better Future for Africa, Balcony Press 2007. ISBN 978-1-890449-22-3; ISBN 978-1-890449-45-2.
