= Samuel Lunden =

American architect (1897–1995)

Samuel Eugene Lunden
- Born: July 14, 1897; Illinois, U.S.
- Died: June 10, 1995 (aged 97); Rancho Palos Verdes, California, U.S.
- Resting place: Green Hills Memorial Park, Rancho Palos Verdes
- Education: California Institute of Technology (1918); Massachusetts Institute of Technology (1921)
- Known for: Doheny Library; Los Angeles Stock Exchange Building
- Children: 3

Samuel Eugene Lunden (July 14, 1897 – June 10, 1995) was an American architect who designed many buildings in Los Angeles, California, particularly on the campus of University of Southern California.

== Early life ==
Samuel Eugene Lunden was born in Illinois on July 14, 1897. He graduated from Pasadena High School, then received his Bachelors of Science from California Institute of Technology in 1918 and Masters of Arts from Massachusetts Institute of Technology in 1921.

== Career ==
Lunden worked as a draftsman for Reginald D. Johnson in Los Angeles County from 1915 to 1918, then worked part-time for Cram and Ferguson Architects, beginning while he was a student at Massachusetts Institute of Technology in 1919 and continuing until 1927. He also was a member of American Students' Reconstruction Unit in France in 1921. In 1927, Lunden worked as a designer for Gordon B. Kaufmann, and in 1928 he worked as Field Supervisor and Manager of Schultze & Weaver's Los Angeles office.

Lunden worked as a principal architect in his own practice from 1928 to 1950 and 1957 to 1960. He was a partner at Lunden, Hayward, and O'Connor from 1950 to 1957 and he partnered with Joseph Leupp Johnson starting in 1960. Lunden sold his practice in 1985 and continued as a consultant afterward.

Lunden joined the American Institute of Architects in 1932 and served as the organization's vice president from 1945 to 1946. He received the Edward C. Kemper Award for his contributions to the Institute and profession in 1963.

=== Style ===
Lunden was best known for his Art Deco and Classic styles.

=== List of works ===
Buildings designed by Lunden include (in Los Angeles, California unless otherwise noted):

==== University of Southern California ====
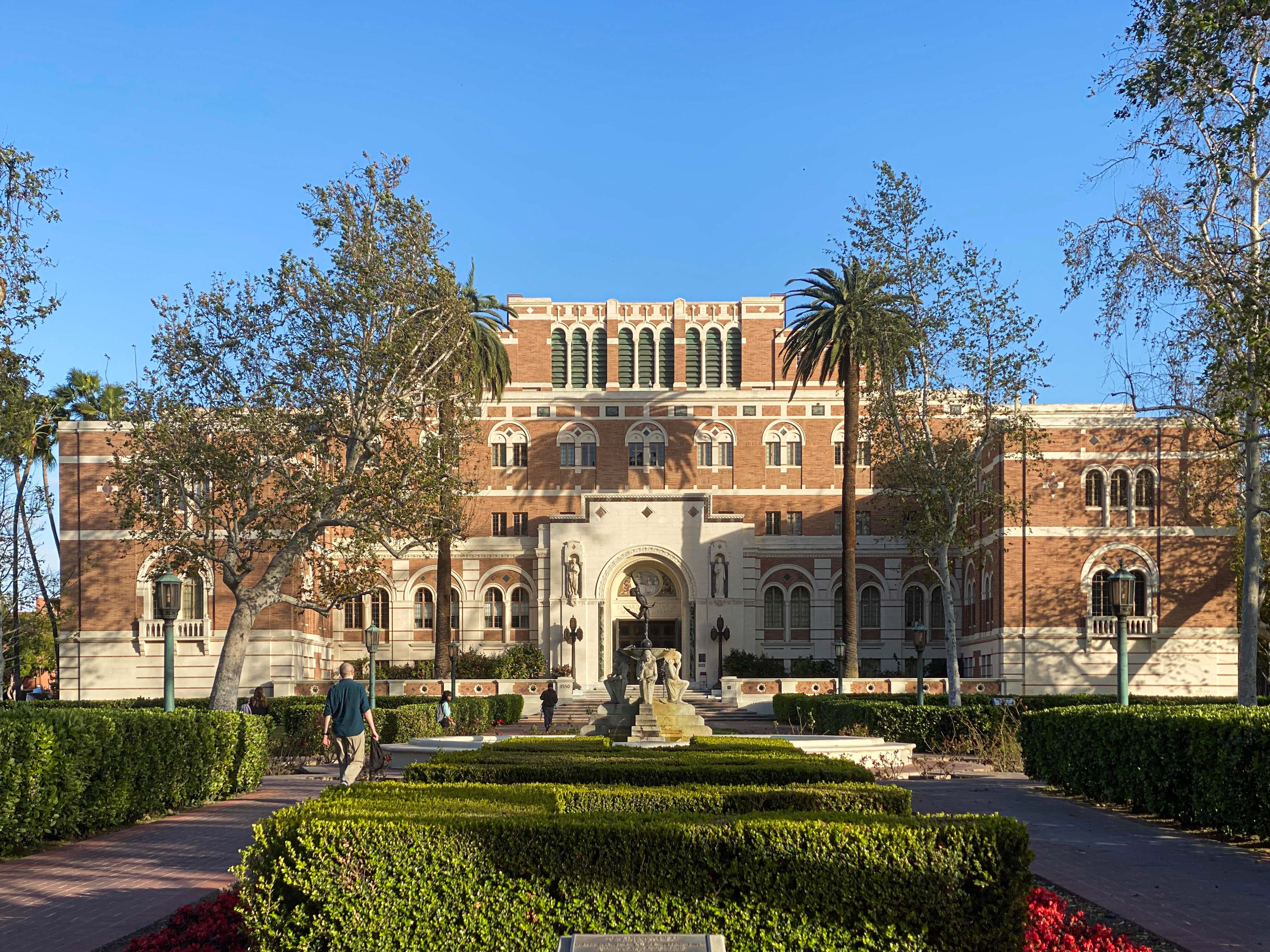
Doheny Library

- Doheny Library (1932), with Ralph Adams Cram
- Hancock Foundation Building (1940), with C. Raimond Johnson, LAHCM No. 1053
- Harris Residence Hall (1950)
- Elisabeth von KleinSmid Residence Hall (1950)
- Doheny Library addition (1967), with Joseph Leupp Johnson
- Gwynn Wilson Student Union (1970 remodel), with Joseph Leupp Johnson
- Hazel and Stanley Hall (1976), with Joseph Leupp Johnson
- Fluor Tower, with Joseph Leupp Johnson
- Hedco Petroleum and Chemical Engineering Building (1982)

==== Other ====
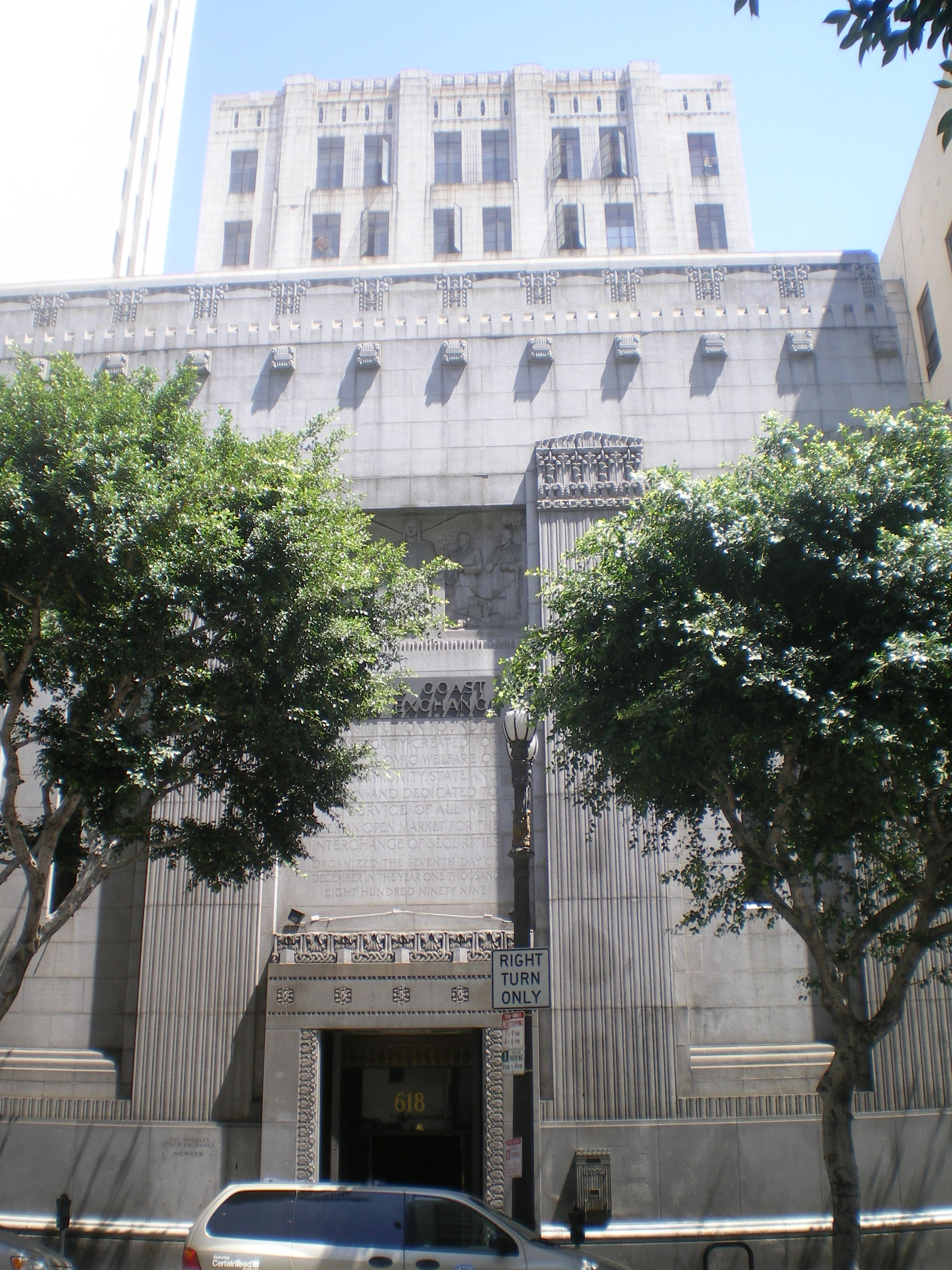
Los Angeles Stock Exchange Building

- St. Vincent de Paul Catholic Church interiors (1925), while employed at Cram and Ferguson, LAHCM No. 90
- Millennium Biltmore Hotel wing (1928)
- Los Angeles Stock Exchange Building (1929), NRHP-listed, LAHCM No. 205, with Parkinson & Parkinson
- Pier Avenue Junior High, Hermosa Beach (1934)
- Los Angeles City Hall South (1954), Lunden, Hayward & O'Connor
- Los Angeles County General Hospital air conditioning plant (1956–57)
- Las Palmas School for Girls, East Los Angeles (1960)

== Personal life and death ==
Lunden served as Los Angeles Town Hall president in 1965. He was also active as a board of governors member for the organization, and was named an honorary life governor in 1984.

Samuel had a son named Robert and two daughters, Alice and Ardel. He was married for 70 years and died in his Rancho Palos Verdes home on June 10, 1995. He was buried at Green Hills Memorial Park in Rancho Palos Verdes.

== Lawsuits ==
- Lunden v. County of Los Angeles, District Court of Appeal, Second District, Division 2, California (1965)
