= Mortgage Guarantee Building =

Building in Los Angeles, California

- U.S. Historic district – Contributing property
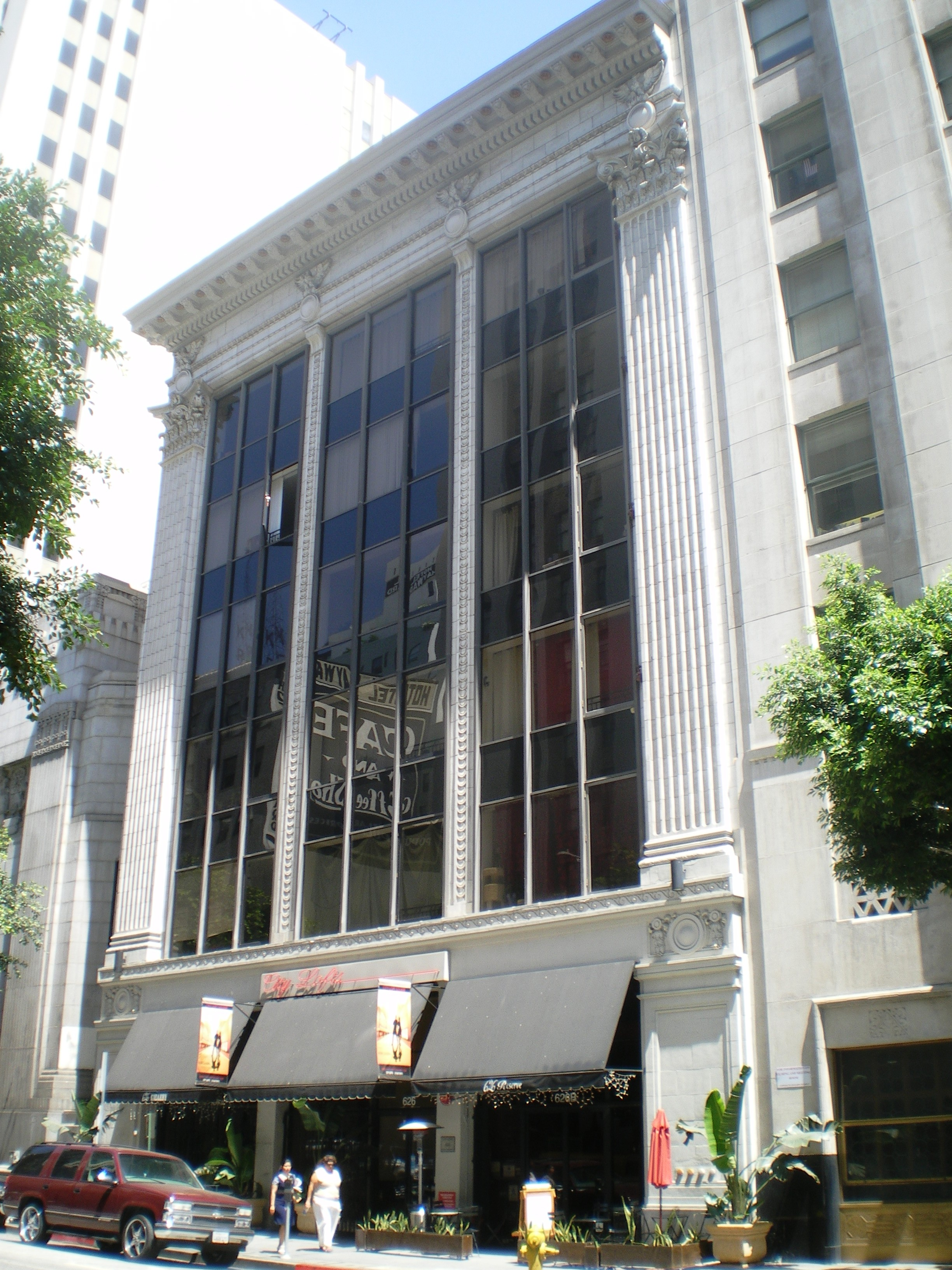
- The building in 2008

- Location within the Los Angeles metropolitan area
- Location: 626 S. Spring Street, Los Angeles, California
- Coordinates: 34.0452°N 118.2513°W
- Built: c. 1913
- Architectural style: Beaux Arts
- Part of: Spring Street Financial District (ID79000489)
- Designated CP: August 10, 1979

Mortgage Guarantee Building, also known as The Sassony and City Lofts, is a historic building located at 626 S. Spring Street in downtown Los Angeles, California. It is a contributing property in the Spring Street Financial District.

== History ==
Mortgage Guarantee Building was built c. 1913 and renovated in 1925.

In 1979, the Spring Street Financial District was added to the National Register of Historic Places, with Mortgage Guarantee Building listed as a contributing property in the district. The building was mostly empty during the 1990s.

Investor Eli Dromy purchased the building in 2001. In 2004, Dromy and developer Izek Shomof converted it to residential and renamed it City Lofts. The cost of the conversation was $8 million ($13.6 million in 2025).

== Architecture and design ==
Mortgage Center Building is six-stories in height, built of concrete, and features decorative cornice, fluted columns, engaged piers, and glass between each pier. The building features a Beaux Arts design and has been described as "boxy." A small second-story-and-above breezeway separates the building from its neighbors.

Inside, the building features exposed brick, hardwood floors, and nearly 16 feet (4.9 m) ceilings.

== See also ==
- List of contributing properties in the Spring Street Financial District
