= California oaks =

California oaks may refer to:

- Native California oaks — oak trees native to the California Floristic Province.
- California oak woodlands — native oaks centered plant community within the California chaparral and woodlands ecoregion.
- California Oaks — an American Thoroughbred horse race held annually in February at Golden Gate Fields in Berkeley, California.
- Oak — a term that can be used as part of the common name of over 400 species of trees and shrubs in the genus Quercus (from Latin: "oak tree").
