= Batchelder House (Pasadena, California) =

Historic house in California, United States

- U.S. National Register of Historic Places
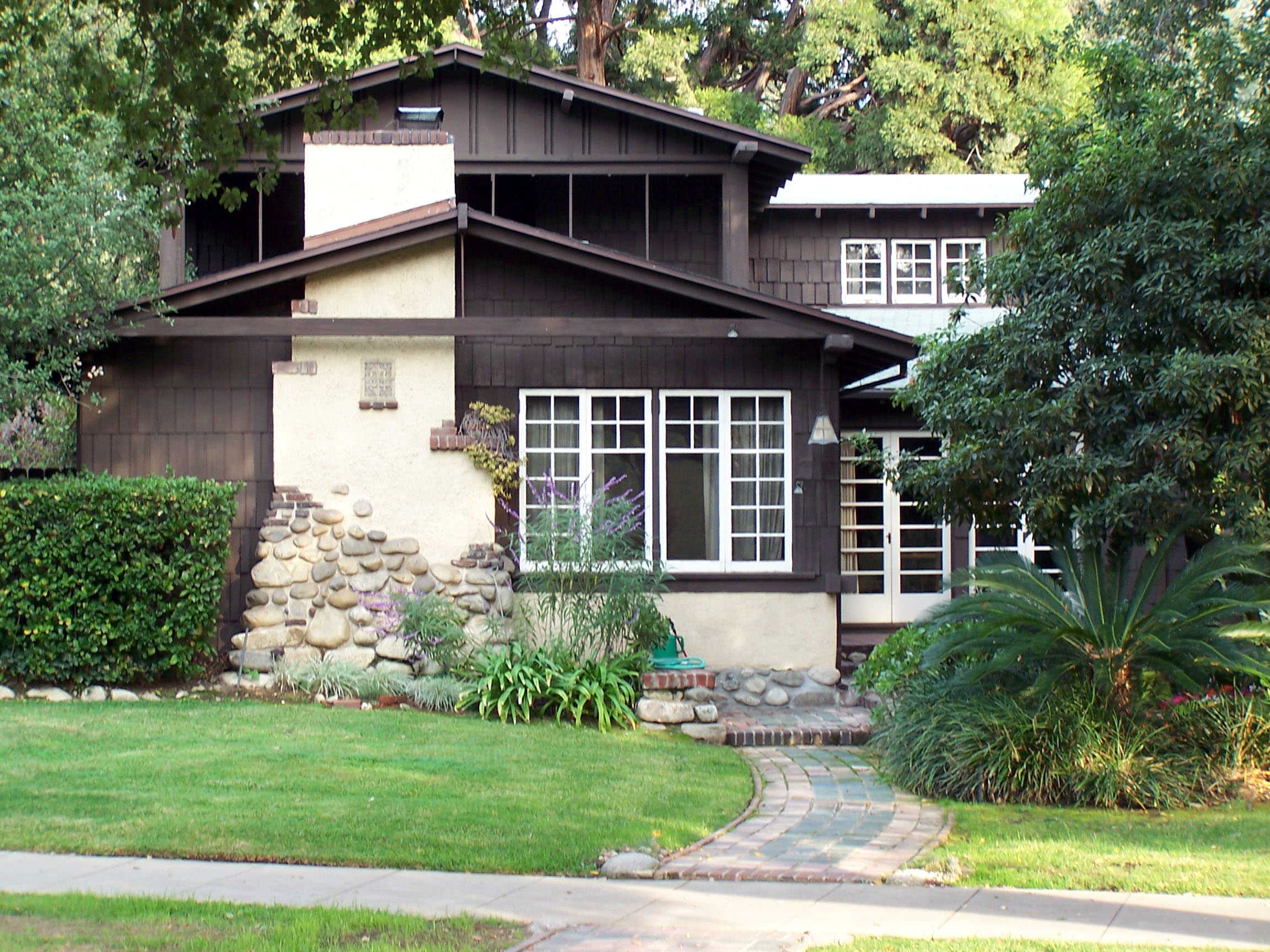

- Location within the Los Angeles metropolitan area Location within California Location within the United States
- Location: 626 S. Arroyo Blvd., Pasadena, California
- Coordinates: 34°8′6″N 118°9′54″W
- Built: 1909
- Architect: Ernest A. Batchelder
- Architectural style: Bungalow/Craftsman
- NRHP reference No.: 78000695
- Added to NRHP: December 14, 1978

The Batchelder House is a historic home built in 1910 and located at 626 South Arroyo Boulevard in Pasadena, California. An important center of Pasadena cultural life in its day, the home was designed and built by Ernest A. Batchelder, a prominent leader of the Arts and Crafts Movement, and his wife, Alice Coleman, an accomplished musician. The house, a large bungalow, has a "woodsy" design with elements of a Swiss chalet style. Batchelder's first craft shop was located in the structure, where decorative tiles were made for Greene and Greene, the Heineman Brothers, and other noted local architects of the era. Coleman also used the house's backyard stage to host chamber music concerts.

The house was added to the National Register of Historic Places on December 14, 1978. It is part of the Lower Arroyo Seco Historic District.

== Gallery ==
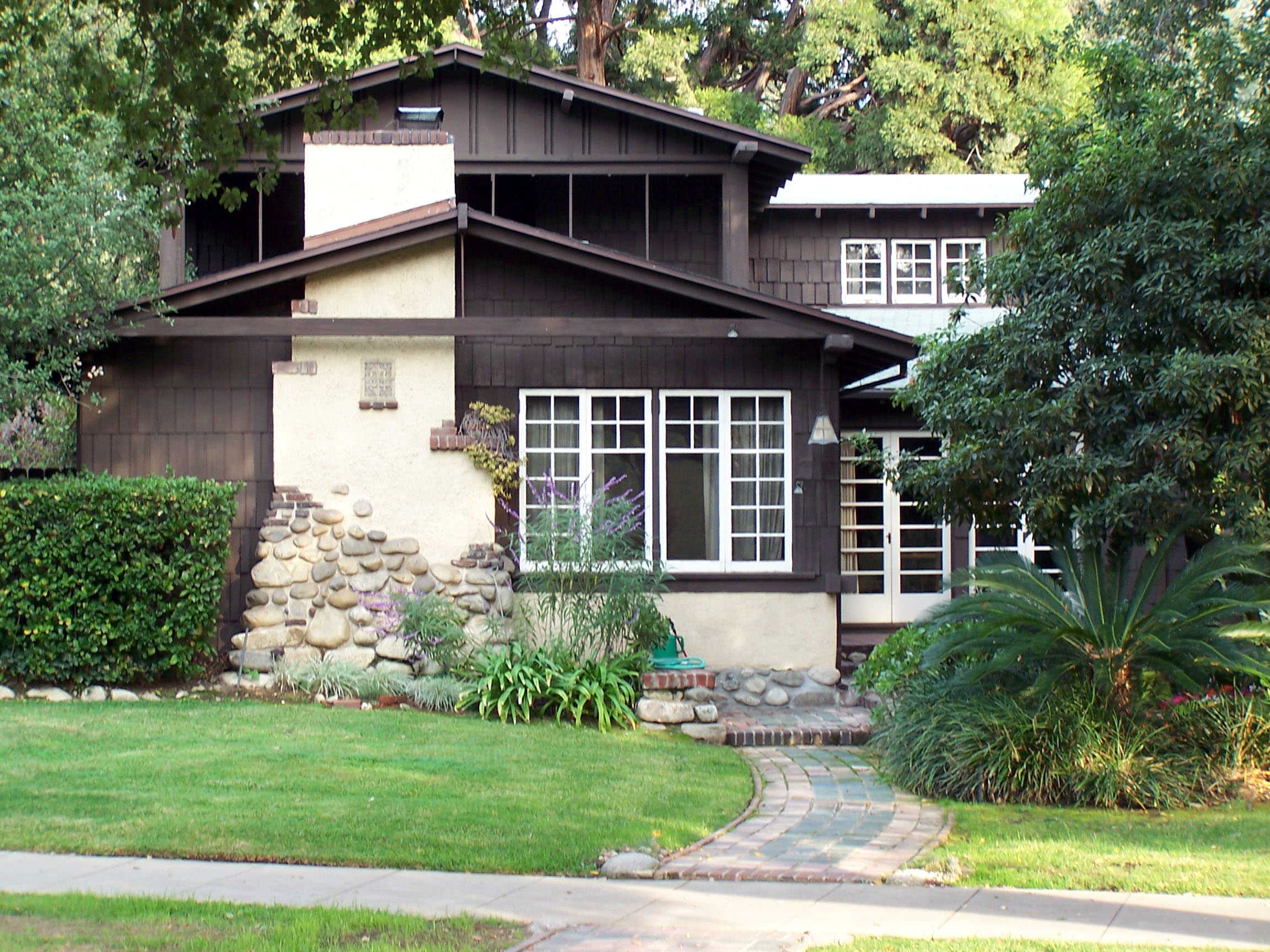

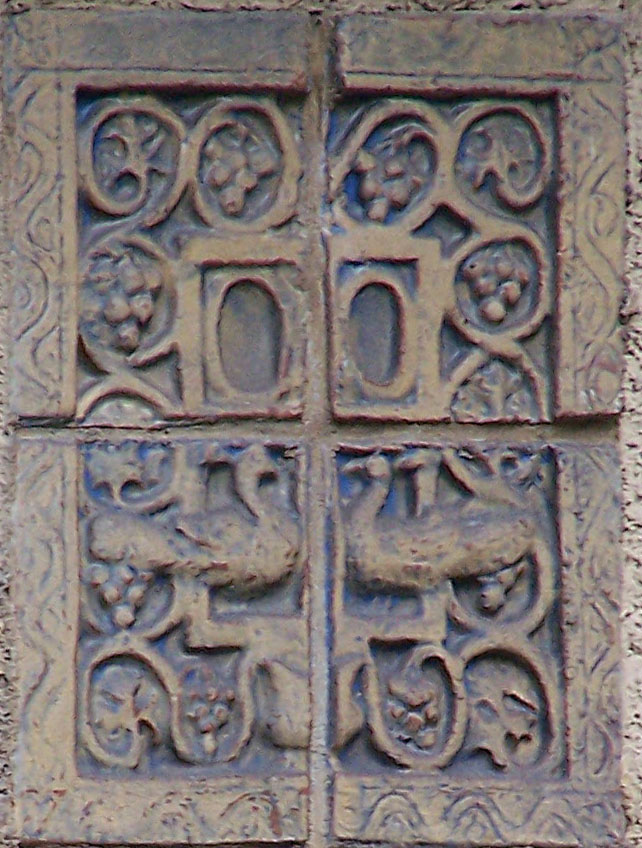
detail of chimney

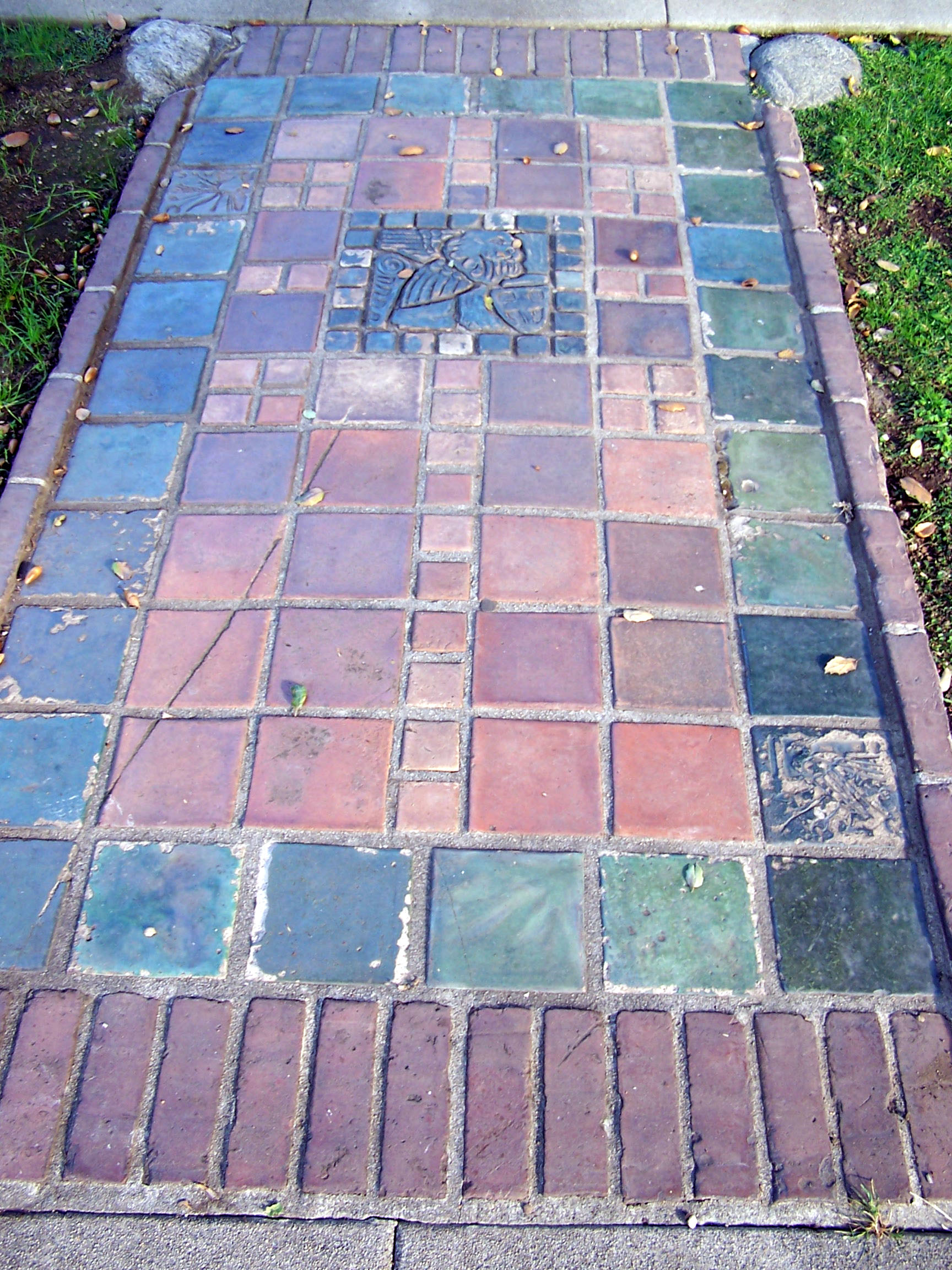
detail of front walkway
