= Broadway-Spring Arcade =

Building in Los Angeles, California, US

- Arcade Building
- U.S. Historic district – Contributing property
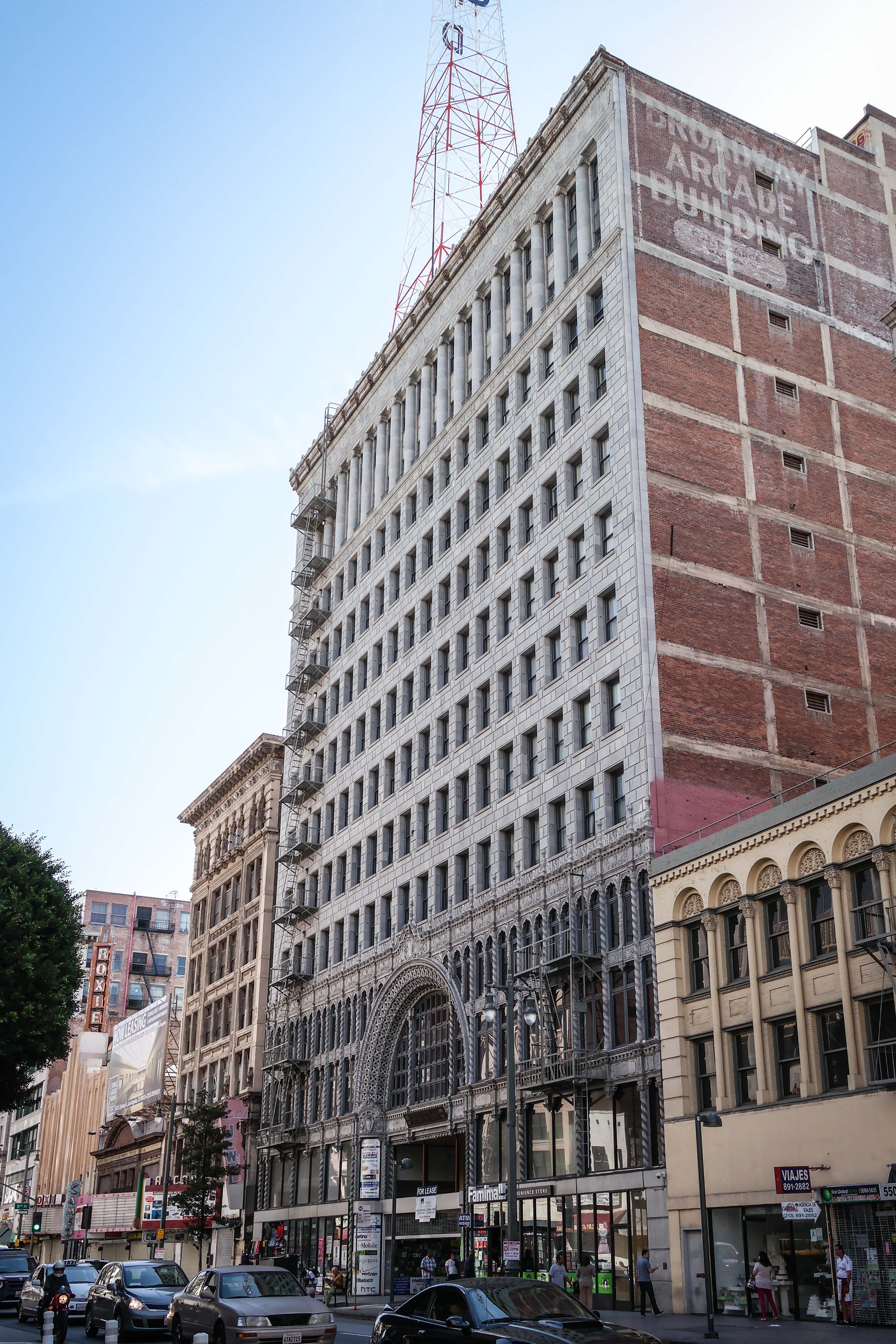
- Arcade Building, Broadway side, in 2014

- Location within the Los Angeles metropolitan area
- Location: 540 S. Broadway / 541 S. Spring Street, Los Angeles, California
- Coordinates: 34.0466°N 118.2507°W
- Built: 1924
- Architect: Kenneth A. MacDonald Jr.
- Architectural style: Spanish Renaissance and Beaux Arts
- Website: springarcadebuilding.com
- Part of: Broadway Theater and Commercial District (ID79000484); Spring Street Financial District (ID79000489)
- Designated CP: May 9, 1979 (Broadway Theater and Commercial District), August 10, 1979 (Spring Street Financial District)

Broadway-Spring Arcade, also known as Broadway Arcade, Spring Arcade, Arcade Building, and Mercantile Arcade Building, refers to three adjoining buildings located at 540 S. Broadway / 541 S. Spring Street. The buildings face both Broadway and Spring Street, connecting the Broadway Theater and Spring Street Financial districts midway between 5th and 6th streets in the historic core of downtown Los Angeles.

== History ==
=== Precursors ===
In 1883, the Los Angeles school board purchased land fronting both Broadway and Spring Street, mid-block between Fifth and Sixth streets, for $12,500 ($431,920 in 2025). Spring Street School was then built on the land.

In 1904, the school board put the land up for lease but retained the material in the schoolhouse. C. Westley Roberts secured a ten-year lease on the land, bought the schoolhouse material, and then demolished the schoolhouse. Mercantile Place opened on the property the following year, and during its existence, it was home to Citron-Favell's Women's Wardrobe, Yamato Japanese art bazaar, Pe-co dance academy, and a Woodmen of the World temple, amongst others.

Around 1914, school board members realized that because the Broadway-Spring property value had increased from $400,000 in 1904 ($14.3 million in 2025) to $1 million ($32.1 million in 2025), Roberts's rental charge was only 2.5% a year on the valuation. As a result, in February 1914, the board signed a new lease with the Mercantile Improvement Association for $3,500 a month and they held a referendum to decide the future of the property. The vote totals of the referendum were: 2,003 to lease the property for fifty years, 1,478 to sell the property, and 931 to do neither of these options.

The school board ultimately sold the property to Adolph Ramish in 1919 for $1.155 million ($21.4 million in 2025). Ramish then resold the property to a group of San Francisco businessmen headed by A.C. Blumenthal for between $1.5 million ($27.9 million in 2025) and $2.5 million ($46.4 million in 2025), in what was described as "probably the largest cash realty transaction in the history of Los Angeles."

Mercantile Place was demolished in 1923, when its title was passed to the Mercantile Arcade Realty Company. The adjoining buildings to the north and south were demolished the following month.

=== Broadway-Spring Arcade ===
==== Preparation and construction ====
The new property owners held an architectural design competition, which was won by architect Kenneth A. MacDonald Jr. and civil engineer Maurice C. Couchot, who were each awarded $60,000 ($964,286 in 2025). The design, patterned after London's Burlington Arcade, featured two twelve-story towers connected by a three-story shopping arcade and included 350 offices and 61 shops.

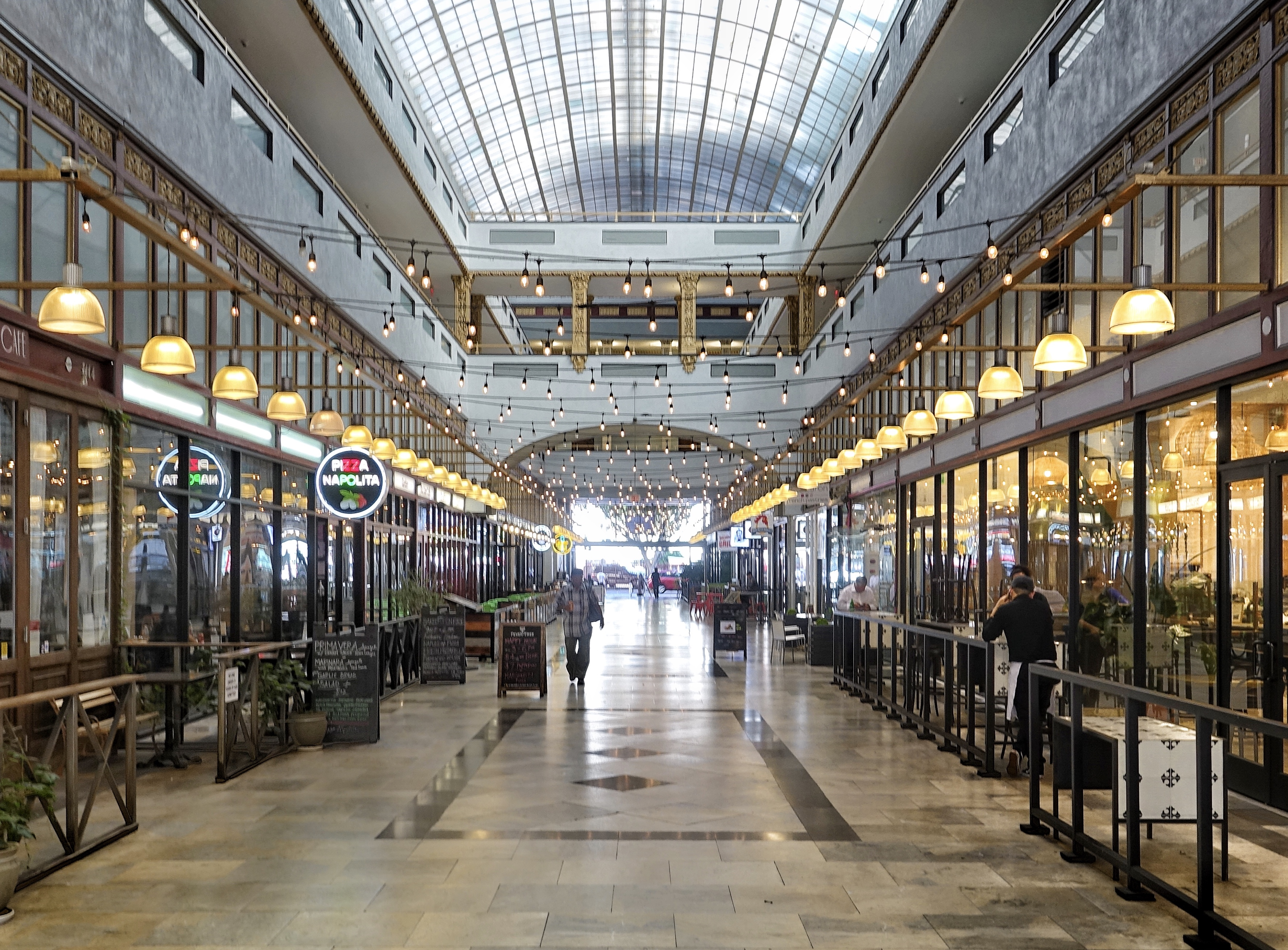
Arcade building interior in 2019

Work on the new buildings, led by Robert Youmans, began in 1922. The structural steel for the twelve-story Broadway building was completed on August 21, 1924, two months after the first column was erected, and the steel framework for the Spring Street building was finished two weeks later. The reinforced-concrete three-story Arcade building, whose skylight necessitating more than 18,000 feet of glass, was also completed quickly. Businesses were moving in by January 7, 1925.

==== Golden era ====
The Arcade opened in February 1924 and was publicized as a "City Within a City," with the Spring Street building designed largely for financial houses and the Broadway building for general tenants. Notable tenants at the opening included Crane's Arcade Barber Shop, Desmond's Men's Arcade Shop, the sixth See's Candy store, Sun Drug, Weaver-Jackson ("the largest hair store and beauty parlor in the west"), Western Union, and a United States Post Office.

In 1932, radio station KRKD erected two self-supporting broadcast towers on the Arcade's roof, each of which supported an AM "hammock" antenna for 1150 kHz. In 1940, twelve Brunswick bowling lanes were installed in the building, and in 1946, the post office in the building closed, as its rent had increased from $1 per year in 1925 ($18.36 in 2025) to $6,000 per year ($99,061 in 2025).

In 1953, the block-long space under the Arcade was proposed as an underground garage.

==== Decline and renovation ====
By 1977, the Broadway-Spring Arcade was under-utilized and was considered for conversion to low and moderate-income elderly housing. In 1979, the Broadway Theater and Commercial District and Spring Street Financial District were added to the National Register of Historic Places, with this building listed as a contributing property in both districts, and the building was purchased by Joseph Hellen in the 1980s.

In 2002, Wade Killefer of Killefer Flammang Architects announced a $15 million plan to turn the property into 142 loft-style apartments, and in 2010, Hellen completed a $34-million ($50.2 million in 2025) conversion of this and the Jewelry Trades Building.

In 2014, the building was awarded $20,788 ($28,272 in 2025) through the Bringing Back Broadway initiative to illuminate the arch above its Broadway entrance. Also in 2014, an application to remove the radio towers from atop the building was rejected, as they were considered historic landmarks. The towers were subsequently painted and lighted to comply with Federal Aviation Administration regulations.

The buildings now feature apartments and a mix of ground floor retail, restaurants, cafes, and bars.

== Architecture and design ==
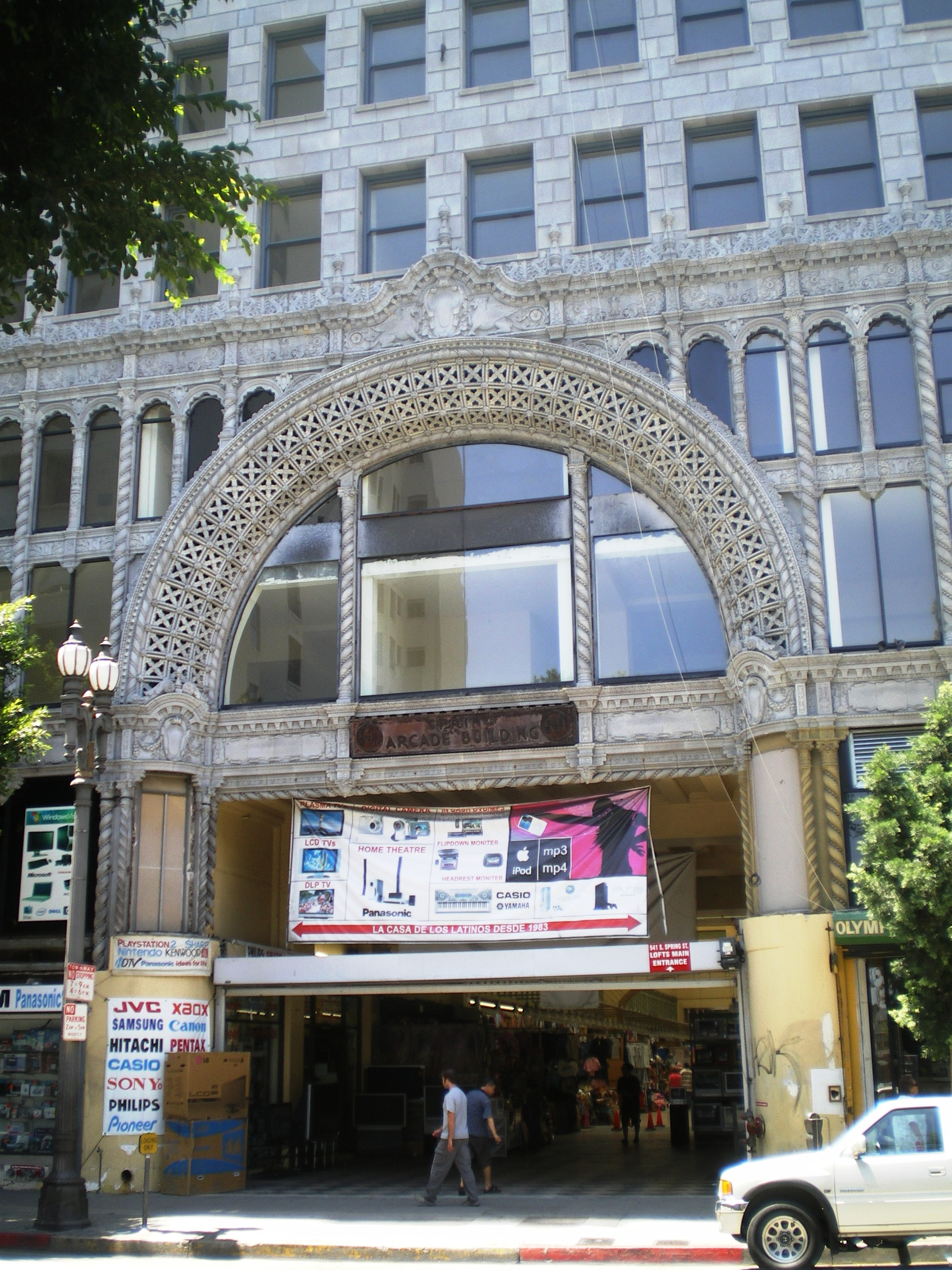
Spring Street entrance

Broadway-Spring Arcade was built of concrete, brick, and stone with terra cotta and wrought iron ornamentation. It features a Spanish Renaissance design on its lower floors, a Beaux Arts design on its upper floors, and an Ionic column colonnade on its top floor, the overall design meant to resemble London's Burlington Arcade.

The arcade's entrances are shaped by thin twisted and beaded columns that rise into delicate arches. The arcade itself measures 86 by 26 feet (26.2 m × 7.9 m), is covered by a glass-roofed skylight, and features a Venetian-styled bridge that spans its center.

== See also ==
- List of contributing properties in the Broadway Theater and Commercial District
- List of contributing properties in the Spring Street Financial District
