= List of Los Angeles Historic-Cultural Monuments in Downtown Los Angeles =

Los Angeles Historic-Cultural Monuments (LAHCMs) in Downtown Los Angeles, Los Angeles, California are designated by the City's Cultural Heritage Commission. There are more than 120 LAHCMs in the downtown area. These include the Old Plaza Historic District, Little Tokyo, Chinatown, the Broadway Theater District, the Spring Street Financial District, and the Fashion District.

== Current and former Historic-Cultural Monuments ==
HCM # (Note: Numbers are as designated by the L.A. Historic-Cultural Monuments program.: Blue colors represent national notability as National Historic Landmarks and are separately listed on the National Register of Historic Places.; Yellow represents sites that are L.A. Historic-Cultural Monuments without a higher designation.; No color represents delisted monuments.)	Landmark name	Image	Date designated	Locality	Neighborhood	Description
3	Nuestra Senora la Reina de Los Angeles	The entrance of Nuestra Señora Reina de los Angeles (La Placita Church) located at 550 Main Street in Downtown Los Angeles on July 20, 2007	August 6, 1962	535 N. Main St. 34°3′25.44″N 118°14′22.46″W	Old Plaza District	Built in 1822, also known as Plaza Church
4	Angels Flight	Angels Flight in May 2004 after the accident; the cars have been placed in storage	August 6, 1962	Hill St. & 3rd St. 34°3′5.93″N 118°14′56.68″W	Bunker Hill	Short funicular railway that operated 1901–1969, 1996–2001, and re-opened 2010; from Hill Street uphill to Bunker Hill; Cars: "Olivet" and "Sinai"
5	The Salt Box		August 6, 1962	339 S. Bunker Hill Ave. 34°3′38.34″N 118°14′43.4″W	Bunker Hill	Saltbox home that was moved to Heritage Square and then destroyed by fire; delisted January 1, 1969.
6	Bradbury Building	Bradbury Bldg., 2005	September 21, 1962	304 S. Broadway; 34°3′2.34″N 118°14′53.29″W	Downtown Los Angeles	Architectural landmark known for its atrium; built in 1893
11	West Temple Apartments (The Rochester)		April 1, 1963	1012 W. Temple St.	Bunker Hill	Woodframe Mansard structure built in 1887; relocated in 1970 and dismantled in 1978; delisted February 14, 1979.
16	St. Joseph's Church		May 10, 1963	218 E. 12th St.	Downtown Los Angeles	Victorian Gothic church built in 1901; destroyed by fire in 1983; delisted September 4, 1963.
17	Saint Vibiana's Cathedral	St. Vibiana complex in 2006, before the cupola was returned in 2007.	May 10, 1963	114 E. Second St.	Downtown Los Angeles	Church dedicated in 1876 and extensively renovated in 1922
26	First Cemetery of Los Angeles		March 20, 1964	521 N. Main St.	Old Plaza District	First graveyard from 1823 to 1844 adjacent to Plaza Church
27	The Castle		May 8, 1964	325 S. Bunker Hill Ave.	Bunker Hill	Victorian house built c. 1882 and moved to Heritage Square in 1969; destroyed by fire and delisted January 1, 1969.
37	Fire Station No. 23		February 18, 1966	225 E. 5th S.	Downtown Los Angeles	Former firehouse built in 1910 with ornate interior; also served as department headquarters and chief's home; used as location in Ghostbusters movies, The Mask, Flatliners and others
43	California Club Building		November 2, 1966	538 S. Flower St.	Downtown Los Angeles	Beaux Arts brick building completed in 1930; designed by Robert D. Farquhar
46	Los Angeles Central Library Building and Grounds		March 1, 1967	630 W. 5th St.	Downtown Los Angeles	Dedicated in 1926, designed by Bertram Grosvenor Goodhue to mimic the architecture of ancient Egypt; third largest public library in the U.S.
60	Biltmore Hotel		July 2, 1969	515 S. Olive St. 34°2′56.77″N 118°15′13.72″W	Pershing Square	Landmark downtown Los Angeles hotel
61	Philharmonic Auditorium		July 2, 1969	427 W. Fifth St.	Downtown Los Angeles	Site of former home of Los Angeles Philharmonic; since demolished
64	Plaza Park		April 1, 1970	Between Chavez Ave., Main St., Los Angeles St. and Plaza	Old Plaza District	Historic district at site of the city's original settlement; includes many of the city's oldest and most historic buildings.
66	St. Paul's Cathedral		May 6, 1970	615 S. Figueroa St.	Downtown Los Angeles	Episcopal cathedral built in 1920s; demolished in 1979.
69	Los Angeles Athletic Club Building		September 16, 1970	431 W. Seventh St.	Downtown Los Angeles	Beaux Arts building designed by Parkinson & Bergstrom in 1912; received publicity on opening for its 100-foot-long (30 m) swimming pool on the sixth floor
71	First African Methodist Episcopal Church		January 6, 1971	801 Towne Ave. (at 8th St.); 34°1′56.92″N 118°15′3.06″W	Downtown Los Angeles	Gothic church built in 1903 based on a design by Sir Christopher Wren; destroyed by fire on July 4, 1972. Church was first organized in 1872.
80	Palm Court (Alexandria Hotel)		March 3, 1971	210 W. Fifth St. 34°2′50.41″N 118°14′58.85″W	Spring Street Financial District	200-foot-long (61 m) dining room with magnificent stained-glass ceiling
82	River Station Area – Southern Pacific Railroad (The Cornfield)		June 16, 1971	Between N. Broadway on west, N. Spring St. on east, north to LA River and Elysian Park, south to Capital Milling Co. Bldg.	Chinatown, Los Angeles	Area contains vestiges of 19th Century railroading, freight yards, warehouses, tracks, switch houses, docks and cobblestone pavement (now Los Angeles State Historic Park).
101	Union Station Terminal and Landscaped Grounds		August 2, 1972	800 N. Alameda St.	Downtown Los Angeles	Passenger terminal opened May 3, 1939; designed by The Parkinsons in the Spanish-colonial style on an Indian village and Chinese town site
104	Cole's P.E. Buffet-Pacific Electric Building		October 17, 1989	118 E. Sixth St.	Downtown Los Angeles	Restaurant operating in the building housing the Pacific Electric terminal; opened in 1903; original designation in 1972 was for the restaurant, but amended in 1989 to include the building
119	Cohn-Goldwater Building		May 16, 1973	525 E. 12th St. 34°2′4.61″N 118°15′16.47″W	Downtown Los Angeles	First modern, Class A, steel-reinforced-concreted factory in Los Angeles built in 1909 by garment manufacturers Morris Cohn and Lemuel Goldwater
121	Garfield Building		March 17, 1982	403 W. 8th St. 34°2′40.97″N 118°15′20.35″W	Downtown Los Angeles	Opulent Art Deco style building designed by Claud Beelman, built in 1928
125	Fine Arts Building		April 17, 1974	811 W. 7th St.	Downtown Los Angeles	Romanesque structure built in 1925, designed by Walker & Eisen; also known as Global Marine House
137	Finney's Cafeteria		January 15, 1975	217 W. Sixth St.	Downtown Los Angeles	Building redesigned to feature Batchelder tiles 1914; originally known as "The Chocolate Shop"
138	Coca-Cola Building		February 5, 1975	1334 S. Central Ave. 34°1′43″N 118°14′42″W	Downtown Los Angeles	Streamline Moderne building designed with appearance of a ship with portholes, catwalk and a bridge; built in 1939
140	Cast Iron Commercial Building		March 19, 1975	740–748 San Pedro St.	Downtown Los Angeles	Prefabricated metal building erected in 1903
150	Los Angeles City Hall		March 24, 1976	200 N. Spring St.	Downtown Los Angeles	Tallest base-isolated structure in the world built in 1928. A Neoclassical base with an Art Deco tower.
156	LAFD Station No. 1		July 7, 1976	2230 Pasadena Ave.	Los Angeles	Streamline Moderne fire station built in 1941 by the Works Progress Administration.
161	Wolfer Printing Company Building		September 15, 1976	416 S. Wall St.	Downtown Los Angeles	Tudor Revival structure built in 1929, patterned after 19th-century English print shop
177	Subway Terminal Building		July 27, 1977	417 S. Hill St.	Downtown Los Angeles	Renaissance Revival building; built in 1925; served as the downtown terminus for the "Hollywood Subway"; currently a luxury apartment building
178	Los Angeles Herald Examiner Building		August 18, 1977	1111 S. Broadway	Downtown Los Angeles	Mission Revival—Spanish Colonial Revival building, designed by Julia Morgan, completed in 1915.
195	James Oviatt Building			617 S. Olive St.	Pershing Square	Art Deco structure built in 1928 designed by Joseph Feil; noted for its extensive use of Lalique glass
196	Variety Arts Center Building			940 S. Figueroa St.	Downtown Los Angeles	Five-story Italian Renaissance Revival-style theater and clubhouse built in 1924 for the Friday Morning Club; designed by Allison & Allison
205	Los Angeles Stock Exchange Building		January 3, 1979	618 S. Spring St.	Spring Street Financial District	Classical Moderne architecture building was designed by Samuel E. Lunden, and opened on January 5, 1931; Bronze doors, cove lighting and ceiling murals are featured inside.
211	Granite Block Paving		March 7, 1979	Bruno St. (between Alameda and N. Main St.)	Chinatown	The last surviving street with the original paving of hand-hewn granite-block, located southwest of Chinatown.
224	Macy Street Viaduct		August 1, 1979	Cesar E. Chavez Ave. (between Mission & Vignes)	Downtown Los Angeles	Constructed in 1926; Spanish Colonial Revival style with ionic and doric columns; street lights with City Seal; formerly Macy Street.
225	Los Angeles Theater		August 15, 1979	615 S. Broadway; 34°2′46.95″N 118°15′9.16″W	Broadway Theater District	Designed by one of the best known theatre architect S. Charles Lee; opened on January 30, 1931.
255	Original Pantry			877 S. Figueroa St.	Downtown Los Angeles	Opened with a 15-stool counter in 1924; "Never Closed – Never Without A Customer" is its slogan. Originally located at 9th & Francisco.
271	Farmers and Merchants Bank Building		August 9, 1983	401 S. Main St. 34°2′53.28″N 118°14′50.64″W	Downtown Los Angeles	An important financial institution in early development of Los Angeles; Beaux Arts design by Morgan & Walls, and constructed by bank founder Isaias Hellman in 1904.
278	Title Guarantee and Trust Company Building			401–411 W. 5th St.	Pershing Square	Zig-Zag Moderne high-rise building on Pershing Square designed by The Parkinsons with Gothic and typical Art Deco elements; later converted into lofts
281	Cathedral High School			1253 Bishops Rd.	Chinatown	Founded in 1923, it is the oldest Catholic high school in the Archdiocese of Los Angeles
286	Mayflower Hotel			535 S. Grand Ave.	Downtown Los Angeles	Moorish Revival-influenced hotel built in 1927, designed by Charles F. Whittlesey
288	Barclay Hotel			103 W. 4th St.	Downtown Los Angeles	Beaux-Arts hotel built in 1896 by Issac Van Nuys was the city's first to provide a telephone in every room; designed by Morgan & Walls
289	Fire Station No. 30			1401 S. Central Ave.	Downtown Los Angeles	Fire station built in 1942, designed by James Backus; it was the city's first segregated African-American firehouse; remained segregated for 25 years
294	Eastern Columbia Building			849 S. Broadway	Downtown Los Angeles	Thirteen-story Zig-Zag Moderne structure designed by Claude Beelman in 1895; strong verticality due to deeply recessed bands of paired metal-sash casement windows set between fluted vertical piers
299	Embassy Auditorium and Hotel			851 S. Grand Ave.	Downtown Los Angeles	Nine-story Beaux Arts structure with four-story Baroque dome built in 1913, designed by Thornton Fitzhugh; finely detailed 1,500-seat auditorium
312	Japanese Union Church of Los Angeles			120 N. San Pedro St. 34°3′3.56″N 118°14′23.74″W	Little Tokyo	Neo-Classical church built in 1923, designed by H.M Patterson; the first church built to house a Protestant congregation for the city's Japanese-American population; Now houses the Union Center for the Arts.
313	Los Angeles Hompa Hongwanji Buddhist Temple		October 24, 1986	109–119 N. Central Ave.; 355–369 E. 1st St.	Little Tokyo	Buddhist temple built 1924–25 designed by Edgar Cline; one of the first religious structures serving the city's Asian population; later became the Japanese American National Museum.
317	Young Apartments		January 7, 1987	1621 S. Grand Ave.	Downtown Los Angeles	Classical Revival structure built in 1911, designed by Robert Brown Young; noted for its ornate designs and scrolled brackets
323	Church of the Open Door			550 S. Hope St.	Downtown Los Angeles	Italian Renaissance style church with two 13-story towers built in 1914; demolished in 1988
340	Standard Oil Company Building			605 W. Olympic Blvd.	Downtown Los Angeles	Beaux Arts structure designed by George W. Kelham, built in 1928
345	Harris Newmark Building			127 E. 9th St.	Downtown Los Angeles	Twelve-story Renaissance Revial building designed in 1926 by Curlett & Beelman
346	Coast Federal Savings Building			315 W. 9th St.	Downtown Los Angeles	Twelve-story U-shaped structure built in 1926, designed by Morgan, Walls & Clements
347	One Bunker Hill Building		March 25, 1988	601 W. 5th St.	Bunker Hill	Formerly the Southern California Edison Company Building, a 14-story Art Deco bldg. built 1930–34, designed by Allison & Allison.
348	Fire Station No. 28			644 S. Figueroa St.	Downtown Los Angeles	Former fire station built in 1922 and later converted into a restaurant serving cuisine based on fire station recipes
354	Giannini-Bank of America			649 S. Olive St.	Downtown Los Angeles	Renaissance Revival structure with monumental Corinthian columns, decorative ironwork and rusticated stone; designed by Morgan, Walls & Clements in 1922 for the Bank of Italy
355	Roosevelt Building			727 W. 7th St.	Downtown Los Angeles	Twelve-story Beaux Arts Renaissance Revival built in 1923, designed by Curlett & Beelman; noted for its monumental arches on the 7th Street facase
356	Barker Brothers Building			818 W. 7th St.	Downtown Los Angeles	Beaux Arts Renaissance Revival structure built in 1925 as main store for the city's largest home furnishings company; designed by Curlett & Beelman
357	Boston Store-J.W. Robinson's			600 W. 7th St.	Downtown Los Angeles	Department store built in 1915, completely remodeled in 1934 with design by Allison & Allison
358	Brock Jewelers-Clifton's			513 W. 7th St.	Downtown Los Angeles	Four-story structure built in 1922 for jewelry manufacturer; later housed Clifton's Cafeteria
385	Title Insurance & Trust Company Building and Annex			419–433 S. Spring St.	Spring Street Financial District	Two buildings designed by The Parkinsons; the main building is known for its restrained Zig-Zag Moderne style and Art Deco lobby
398	Pacific Mutual Building		August 6, 1982	523 W. 6th St.	Downtown Los Angeles	Three connected structures was once home to the Pacific Life Insurance Company; the original 1908 Beaux Arts building was remodeled in 1929 when the large central unit was built
449	Palace Theatre			630 S. Broadway	Broadway Theater District	French classical theater built in 1911 as an Orpheum Theater; facade details by Domingo Mora; first use of polychrome terra-cotta in Los Angeles
450	Tower Theatre (Los Angeles)			800 S. Broadway	Broadway Theater District	Theater built in 1927 and designed by S. Charles Lee; it was downotown's first theater built for talking motion pictures; noted for its terra cotta details on its facade and art-glass window over the entry
459	Hamburger's Department Store			801–829 S. Broadway	Broadway Theater District	Six-story, steel-frame Beaux Arts department store designed by Alfred F. Rosenheim, built in 1907
460	Mayan Theater			1044 S. Hill St.	Downtown Los Angeles	Theater built in 1927 by Morgan, Walls & Clements with Mayan decorations by Francisco Cornejo; later converted into a night club
472	Rialto Theater (Marquee, Box Office & Original Marble Entry Floor)			812 S. Broadway	Broadway Theater District	Rare example of a 1930s rectangular marquee with original neon elements and Art Deco box office
476	Belasco Theater			1046–1054 S. Hill St.	Downtown Los Angeles	Six-story steel-reinforced structure built in 1926 for live theater; designed by Morgan, Walls & Clements with cast stone details in Churrigueresque, Moorish and Gothic styles
480	Spanish–American War Memorial			Pershing Square	Downtown Los Angeles	Life-size granite statue of soldier completed in 1900 by S.M. Goddard as a memorial to seven local soldiers who died in the Spanish–American War
522	State Theater Building			701–713 S. Broadway & 300–314 W. 7th St.	Broadway Theater District	Steel reinforced theater built in 1921 in the Plateresque style; built as a Loew's theater
523	United Artists Theater Building			927–939 S. Broadway	Broadway Theater District	First theater built by United Artists; built in 1927 in Spanish Gothic style
524	Cameo Theater (formerly Clune's Broadway)			526–530 S. Broadway; 34°2′50.31″N 118°15′4.1″W	Broadway Theater District	Theater designed by Alfred Rosenheim, built in 1910; it was the longest continually operating movie theater in California until it closed in 1991
525	Arcade Theater (formerly Pantages Theater)			532–536 S. Broadway; 34°2′49.91″N 118°15′4.56″W	Broadway Theater District	Theater built by vaudeville producer Alexander Pantages in 1910 with Beaux Arts facade
526	Roxie Theatre			512–524 S. Broadway	Broadway Theater District	Art Deco movie theater built in 1931, designed by John Cooper
544	Irvine-Byrne Building			249 S. Broadway	Downtown Los Angeles	Five-story Beaux Arts building designed by Sumner Hunt, built in 1895
596	Petroleum Building		April 26, 1994	700–714 W. Olympic Blvd./1001-1013 S. Flower St.	Downtown Los Angeles	Meyer & Holler designed the 1925 building with the feeling of Florentine palaces of the early Renaissance period
615	San Pedro Firm Building		January 18, 1995	108–116 N. San Pedro St.	Little Tokyo	William E. Young designed this 1925 Classical Revival style building; it helps document the history of the Japanese American community; a mixed-use building of apartments over stores; features formal symmetric facade, brick pilasters, and a major elevation organized into three horizontal zones.
631	Banks-Huntley Building		January 14, 1997	634 S. Spring St.	Spring Street Financial District	
671	Barclay's Bank			639–641 S. Spring St.	Spring Street Financial District	
686	Superior Oil Company Building			550 S. Flower St.	Downtown Los Angeles	
708	Gerry Building			910 S. Los Angeles St. 34°2′25.56″N 118°15′15.86″W	Fashion District	Streamline Modern building in Fashion District originally used for garment manufacture
709	Gray Building			824 S. Los Angeles St.	Fashion District	
710	M. J. Connell Buildings 1, 2, 3 & 7			714, 716, 720 & 724 S. Los Angeles St.	Fashion District	
711	M. J. Connell Buildings 4, 5, & 6			738 & 746 S. Los Angeles St. and 743 Santee St.	Fashion District	
712	Textile Center Building			315 E. 8th St.	Fashion District	Landmark building in the Fashion District developed in 1926 by pioneering female developer, Florence Casler; now converted into condominiums
728	San Fernando Building			400 S. Main St.	Downtown Los Angeles	Renaissance Revival style office building dating to 1906; part of the Old Bank District loft project
729	Hellman Building			410 S. Spring St./411 S. Main St.	Spring Street Financial District	Beaux Arts design by Morgan & Walls, and constructed by bank founder Isaias Hellman in 1904.
730	Continental Building			408 S. Spring St.	Spring Street Financial District	
737	Gans Brothers Building			814 S. Spring St.	Downtown Los Angeles	
741	Security Building			500–510 S. Spring St.	Spring Street Financial District	
748	South Park Loft Building			816 S. Grand Ave.	Downtown Los Angeles	Highrise parking garage designed by Claud Beelman and built in 1924; now known as "South Park Lofts"
765	Blackstone's Department Store			901 S. Broadway	Downtown Los Angeles	
766	General Petroleum Building			612 S. Flower St.	Downtown Los Angeles	Highrise built in 1949 as offices for oil company; later converted into the Pegasus Apartments
772	Title Insurance Building			456 S. Spring St.	Spring Street Financial District	
786	Edwards-Wildey Building			609 S. Grand Ave.	Downtown Los Angeles	
789	Southern California Gas Company Complex			800–820 S, Flower St.	Downtown Los Angeles	
795	Santa Fe Inbound Freight House			355 S. Santa Fe	Downtown Los Angeles	
806	Kerckoff Building and Annex			558–564 S. Main St.	Downtown Los Angeles	
825	Chinatown West Gate			954 N. Hill St.	Chinatown	West gate into New Chinatown, which was founded in 1938 by Chinese-Americans after they were relocated from their site at Union Station.
826	Chinatown East Gate			945 N. Broadway	Chinatown	East gate entrance to New Chinatown, a first outdoor mall in the United States that was built in 1939 by Chinese-Americans.
871	810 South Spring Street Building		2007	810 S. Spring St.	Downtown Los Angeles	Twelve-story Beaux-Arts building designed by architects Albert R. Walker and Percy A. Eisen, who also designed the Fine Arts Building and the James Oviatt Building.
872	Raphael Junction Block Building (New York Suspender Factory-California Ice Company)		2007	1635–1637 N. Spring St.	Chinatown	The Victorian-era Flatiron style building was built in 1889 for Charles Raphael, a Los Angeles businessman. Triangular in shape, it housed the New York Suspender Factory and the California Ice Company.
873	Higgins Building		2007	108 W. 2nd St.	Downtown Los Angeles	This 10-story Beaux-Arts style building was built and owned by Thomas Higgins in 1909; Albert C. Martin, Sr. and A.L. Haley were architects; housed the Los Angeles County Engineer Department for many years. Clarence Darrow was a tenant.
881	Judson-Rives Building			424 S. Broadway	Downtown Los Angeles	
888	National Biscuit Company Building			1850 Industrial St.	Downtown Los Angeles	
898	Van Nuys Building			204–212 W. 7th St., 701 S. Spring St.	Spring Street Financial District	
899	Charles C. Chapman Building			756 S. Broadway	Downtown Los Angeles	
900	North Spring Street Bridge, No. 53C0859			N. Spring St. between Aurora St. and S. Avenue 18; 34°4′14.55″N 118°13′28.8″W	Downtown Los Angeles	
901	North Main Street Bridge, No. 53C1010			N. Spring St. between Chavez St. and Albion St.	Downtown Los Angeles	
902	Olympic Boulevard Bridge, No. 53C0163			E. Olympic Blvd. between Rio Vista Ave. and Santa Fe Ave.	Downtown Los Angeles	
904	Seventh Street Bridge, No. 53C1321			E. 7th St. between Santa Fe Ave. and Meyers St.	Downtown Los Angeles	
906	Fourth Street Bridge, No. 53C0044			E. 4th St. between Santa Fe Ave. and Mission Rd.	Downtown Los Angeles	
909	First Street Bridge, No. 53C1166			E. 1st St. between Vignes St. and Mission Rd.	Downtown Los Angeles	
920	Aoyama Tree		May 20, 2008	135 N. Central Ave.	Little Tokyo	Ficus macrophylla (Moreton Bay fig). The 1920 planted rubber tree is the symbolic of the history of the Koyasan Buddhist Temple and the Japanese Americans in Los Angeles.
930	Garment Capitol Building		July 29, 2008	217–221 E. 8th St.	Downtown Los Angeles	
937	Westinghouse Electric Building		October 28, 2008	420 S. San Pedro St. 34°2′41.47″N 118°14′33.51″W	Downtown Los Angeles	Art Deco, 1922.
953	Foreman & Clark Building		May 20, 2009	701 S. Hill St. 34°2′45″N 118°15′17.66″W	Downtown Los Angeles	Art Deco-Gothic style, 1929, flagship of Foreman & Clark department stores.
957	Great Republic Life Building		May 20, 2009	756 S. Spring St. 34°2′37.54″N 118°15′10.74″W	Downtown Los Angeles	Built 1923.
966	Douglas Building		September 23, 2009	257 S. Spring St. 34°3′2.44″N 118°14′48.46″W	Downtown Los Angeles	Classical Revival, 1898, designed by Reid Brothers.
984	Spreckels Building		June 8, 2010	708–716 S. Hill St.	Downtown Los Angeles	This 1922 Beaux-Arts style building was constructed for the real estate firm of Dunn & Williams of San Francisco; sold in 1924 to real estate entrepreneurs John and Adolph Spreckels. It has associated with the commercial and financial development of Downtown.
985	Sun Realty Company Building		June 8, 2010	629–633 S. Hill St.	Downtown Los Angeles	Art Deco style, 1930.
1001	May Company Garage		June 1, 2011	9th and Hill Streets	Downtown Los Angeles	Beaux-Arts style nine-story parking garage and retail building built in 1927. Designed by Claude Beelman and William Curlett,
1019	Metropolitan Building		April 27, 2011	315 W. 5th Street	Downtown	Constructed in 1913
1022	Los Angeles Department of Water and Power General Office Building (John Ferraro Building)		September 21, 2011	111 N. Hope Street	Civic Center	The building was named for former City Council President John Ferraro. He played football for the USC Trojans
1029	Hotel Stowell		April 5, 2013	416 South Spring Street	Downtown Los Angeles	
1125	Forve-Pettebone Building		June 14, 2016	510 S. Broadway	Downtown Los Angeles	Brick office building built in 1905
1140	Hotel Cecil		January 28, 2017	640 S. Main Street	Downtown Los Angeles	Beaux-Arts-style hotel built in 1924
1155	F. and W. Grand Silver Store Building		February 27, 2018	537 S. Broadway	Downtown Los Angeles	Art Deco commercial structure built in 1931
1174	Times-Mirror Square (Los Angeles Times Building)		December 5, 2018	First and Spring Streets	Civic Center	1935-1973, City Council action removed the 1973 William Pereira addition from the nomination
1183	Grand Central Market		July 2, 2019	315 S. Broadway	Downtown Los Angeles	Beaux-Arts-style office building and public market built in 1896.
1184	Million Dollar Theatre		July 2, 2019	307 S. Broadway	Downtown Los Angeles	Spanish Colonialk Revival movie palace built in 1917.
1206	Union Bank Plaza		February 26, 2020	445 S. Figueroa Street	Downtown Los Angeles	International Style-style skyscraper built in 1968. First LA skyscraper listed.
1207	Desmond's Department Store		September 15, 2020	614 S. Broadway	Downtown Los Angeles	Spanish Baroque/Beaux Arts-styled retail structure built in 1924.

== Listed in the National Register of Historic Places ==
Code	Landmark name	Image	Selected date	Locality	Neighborhood	Description
LAHCM; 6	Bradbury Building		LAHCM; September 21, 1962	304 S. Broadway	Broadway Theatre District	Architectural masterpiece built in 1893. Known for its vast sunlit atrium used as an iconic filming location for over 100 years.
	Broadway Theater and Commercial District			242-947 S. Broadway	Broadway Theater District	First and largest historic theater district on the National Register; with 12 movie palaces in 6 blocks, the largest concentration of movie palaces in the United States
	Spring Street Financial District			354-704 S. Spring St.	Spring Street Financial District	Once known as the "Wall Street of the West", the old financial district includes the city's first skyscraper and more than 20 other historic buildings along a three-block stretch of Spring
	Little Tokyo Historic District		1995	301-369 First and 106-120 San Pedro Sts.	Little Tokyo	Cultural center for Japanese Americans in Southern California, former site of the first Nishi Honganji Buddhist Temple
	Board of Trade Building			111 W. 7th St.	Downtown Los Angeles	Beaux-Arts highrise designed by Claud Beelman used as headquarters for California Stock Exchange starting in 1930
	Federal Reserve Bank of San Francisco, Los Angeles Branch			409 W. Olympic Blvd.	Downtown Los Angeles	Original Los Angeles branch building of the Federal Reserve Bank of San Francisco built in 1929; designed by The Parkinsons in a Moderne style
LAHCM; 1184	Million Dollar Theater		LAHCM; July 2, 2019	307 S. Broadway	Broadway Theater District	One of the first movie palaces built in the United States
	Santa Fe Freight Depot			970 E. 3rd St.	Downtown Los Angeles	Former freight depot built in 1922, converted in 2000 into campus for architectural school; the quarter-mile long building stretches further than the height of the Empire State Building
	United States Court House (Spring Street, Los Angeles)			312 N. Spring St.	Downtown Los Angeles	
	United States Post Office - Los Angeles Terminal Annex			900 Alameda St.	Downtown Los Angeles	Mission Revival building designed by Gilbert Stanley Underwood; LA's central mail processing facility from 1940 to 1989
	Plaza Substation			10 Olvera St.	Old Plaza District	Electrical substation that was part of the "Yellow Car" streetcar system operated by the Los Angeles Railway from 1904 to 1963

== See also ==
- Bibliography of California history
- Bibliography of Los Angeles
- Outline of the history of Los Angeles

=== Lists of L.A. Historic-Cultural Monuments ===
- Historic-Cultural Monuments on the East and Northeast Sides
- Historic-Cultural Monuments in the Harbor area
- Historic-Cultural Monuments in Hollywood
- Historic-Cultural Monuments in the San Fernando Valley
- Historic-Cultural Monuments in Silver Lake, Angelino Heights, and Echo Park
- Historic-Cultural Monuments in South Los Angeles
- Historic-Cultural Monuments on the Westside
- Historic-Cultural Monuments in the Wilshire and Westlake areas

=== Other ===
- City of Los Angeles' Historic Preservation Overlay Zones
- National Register of Historic Places listings in Los Angeles
- National Register of Historic Places listings in Los Angeles County
- List of California Historical Landmarks
