= Crossroads of the World (disambiguation) =

Crossroads of the World is an outdoor shopping mall in Los Angeles.

Crossroads of the World may also refer to:

- Times Square, a major commercial intersection in New York City
- Gander International Airport, an airport located in Gander, Newfoundland and Labrador
- Ottoman empire, an empire that spanned three continents: Europe, Africa and Asia
