= Barclay Hotel (Los Angeles) =

Historic hotel in Los Angeles, California

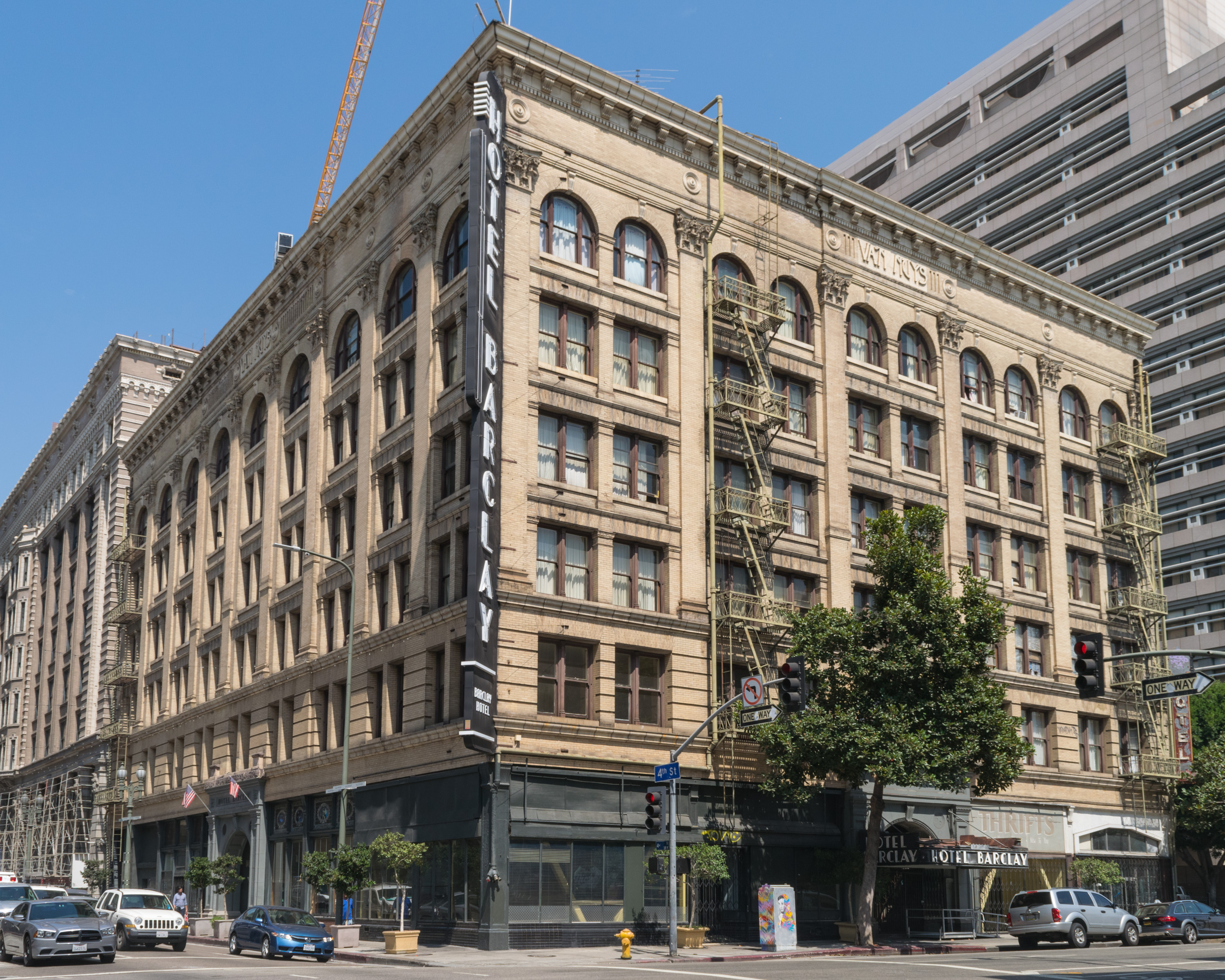
- Interactive map of the Barclay Hotel area
- Former names: Van Nuys Hotel

General information
- Architectural style: Beaux-Arts
- Location: 103 W 4th Street; Los Angeles, California; United States
- Coordinates: 34°02′55″N 118°14′50″W
- Opened: January 19, 1897; 129 years ago
- Cost: US$275,000
- Owner: Healthy Housing Foundation

Technical details
- Floor count: 6

Design and construction
- Architecture firm: Morgan and Walls

Los Angeles Historic-Cultural Monument
- Official name: Barclay Hotel
- Designated: February 1, 1985
- Reference no.: 288

The Barclay Hotel is a historic hotel in Downtown Los Angeles, California. Located at the corner of 4th Street and Main Street, it was originally owned by real estate developer Isaac Newton Van Nuys and opened as the Van Nuys Hotel in 1897. The six-story building was designed by architecture firm Morgan and Walls in the Beaux-Arts style. At the time of its opening, the hotel was one of the most luxurious in Los Angeles and was the first in the city to have electricity and a telephone in every room.

The Barclay is the oldest continuously operating hotel in Los Angeles. Despite its initial popularity among high-profile visitors to the city, most of the hotel's history has been associated with vagrancy and crime. Several deaths have occurred on the property, including two murders. In 2021, city officials converted the building into a low-income housing project.

== History ==
=== 1897–1929: Van Nuys Hotel era ===
Los Angeles real estate developer Isaac Newton Van Nuys opened the Van Nuys Hotel on January 19, 1897. Local architecture firm Morgan and Walls designed the six-story building in the Beaux-Arts style; it cost US$275,000 to build. At the time of its opening, the Van Nuys was one of the most luxurious hotels in Los Angeles. It was the first in Los Angeles to provide electricity and a telephone in every room.

Two months after the hotel opened, a hotel room service waiter named Charles Gamble died from a three-story fall down the elevator shaft due to an operator's error. In 1901, another hotel employee named Joe Kato was killed during an accident in the elevator shaft.

On May 8, 1901, U.S. president William McKinley and First Lady Ida McKinley visited the Van Nuys Hotel during a tour of the West Coast. The two were greeted with a reception and a large crowd outside the hotel.

Although the hotel was well-received for its luxury and often hosted high-profile guests, patterns of crime developed in and around the establishment. Hotel proprietor Milo Potter attempted to upkeep the hotel's image in the "teeming, wild" downtown section of Los Angeles, such as an attempt to shut down the neighboring 400 Club Bar because of the rowdy crowds it attracted to the area. Some of the hotel's employees stole belongings from suites and bar fights occasionally broke out between patrons in the hotel. In 1902, hotel butcher Robert Evans was killed during a knife fight.

In 1909, Ada Tilt Otis, an heiress from Chicago, killed herself by ingesting poison in her Van Nuys hotel room following a divorce from her husband. W. Arthur Phipps, a Canadian millionaire, died of cirrhosis at the Van Nuys in 1911 after secluding himself in a suite for eight years in paranoia that the Black Hand extortion racket was targeting him.

In 1920, a Van Nuys guest attempted suicide. In 1924, William Edward Collier killed himself by swallowing a cyanide pill in front of a hotel employee who was helping him pack his belongings.

=== 1929–present: Barclay Hotel era, murders ===
In 1929, Consolidated Hotels, Inc. acquired the lease on the Van Nuys Hotel, which had lost its status and become associated with transient culture. Upon acquisition, the company renamed the establishment to the Barclay Hotel and closed its dining room.

On December 29, 1937, a wealthy woman named Elizabeth Reis checked into the Barclay. Three days later, she was found by an employee sitting in a chair with her skull cracked from an apparent attack with a brick found on her bed. Reports of the incident did not make clear whether or not Reis succumbed to her injuries.

On November 14, 1944, ex-Naval hospital corpsman Otto Stephen Wilson checked into the Barclay under the names "Mr. and Mrs. O. S. Wilson" despite being alone. Thereafter, he encountered Virgie Lee Griffin, who was intoxicated, at a local bar and solicited her to his hotel room for $5. Wilson, described as a sadist with prior fantasies of violence and cannibalism, used a butcher knife he had purchased earlier in the day to stab and mutilate Griffin's body. Wilson abandoned a plan to sever Griffin's corpse into several pieces to be transported out of the hotel inconspicuously. The body was later found in the hotel room's closet following Wilson's departure. Wilson murdered another woman at a different Los Angeles hotel the next day and was ultimately sentenced to death in 1946.

On the morning of March 15, 1972, a fire broke out on the sixth floor of the Barclay Hotel. Of the 132 guests at the hotel, over 40 had to be rescued. Three people were killed by the fire and seven were injured. The blaze caused $65,000 in damage to the building.

On January 25, 1975, a vagrant named Samuel Suarez was murdered by serial killer Vaughn Greenwood, initially known as the Skid Row Slasher, at the Barclay Hotel. Greenwood targeted drifters in the Los Angeles area and was ultimately sentenced to life imprisonment for 11 murders.

On June 3, 2017, Los Angeles Fire Department firefighter Kelly Wong fell from a ladder while ascending to the sixth floor of the Barclay Hotel during a training exercise. Wong died from his injuries two days later; it was the first training death in the department since 1985.

In 2021, the Healthy Housing Foundation converted the Barclay Hotel into a low-rent housing project for homeless families. The conversion was part of an initiative to turn 11 hotels in the Los Angeles area into affordable housing. At the time of the project's opening, 158 units were offered for rent at a range of $400 to $750 per month.

== Architecture ==
Local architectural firm Morgan and Walls designed the six-story building in the Beaux-Arts style with elements of Romanesque architecture. The building is cream-colored. Its second floor is made of terracotta scored to appear as stonework and its upper four floors are made of pressed brick. The exterior features several pilasters fashioned to resemble the Corinthian order. Van Nuys, the original name of the hotel, is inscribed under the cornice on both of the building's frontage sides. An early Barclay-era ghost sign advertising $1 lodging rates remains on one side of the building.

Many of the original ornamentations from 1897 remain in the Sullivanesque lobby. The interior features ceiling decorations, pillars, and arched doorways. Stained glass transom windows on the first floor depict Victorian era banquet scenes and one features a pair of seahorses flanking a Van Nuys crest.

== See also ==
- List of Los Angeles Historic-Cultural Monuments in Downtown Los Angeles
