= Gerry Building =

- U.S. National Register of Historic Places
- Los Angeles Historic-Cultural Monument
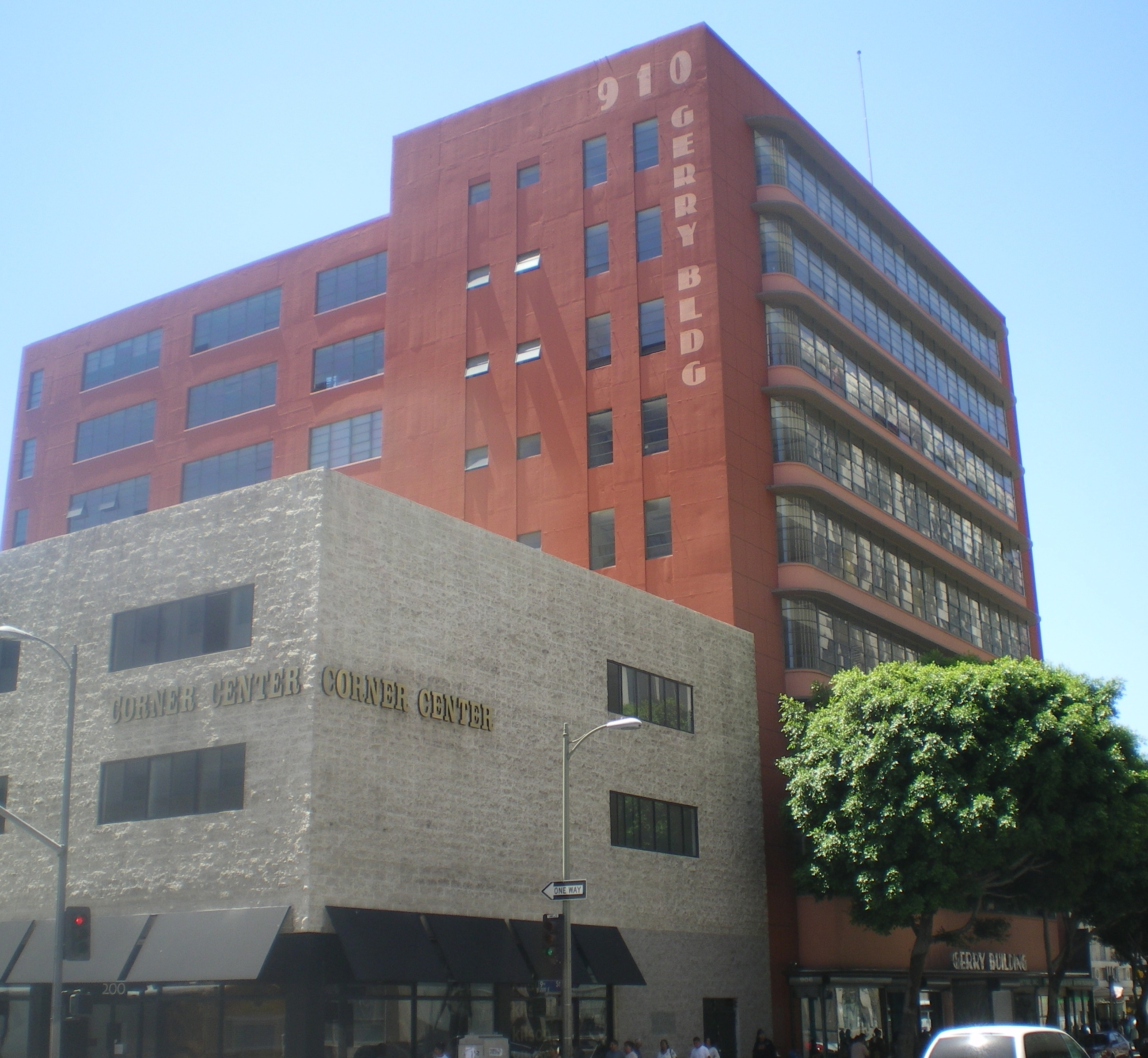
- Gerry Building, 2008

- Location within the Los Angeles metropolitan area Location within California Location within the United States
- Location: 910 S. Los Angeles St., Los Angeles, California
- Coordinates: 34°2′27″N 118°15′11″W
- Built: 1947
- Architect: Maurice Fleischman
- Architectural style: Moderne
- NRHP reference No.: 03000583
- LAHCM No.: 708
- Added to NRHP: July 5, 2003

Gerry Building is a high-rise building in the Fashion District of Los Angeles. Built in 1947, the Streamline Moderne style building was added to the National Register of Historic Places in 2003.

It is located in the Fashion District and originally was used for garment manufacture.

It is a nine-story concrete building "dominated by eight curved tiers of windows. The curving motif is repeated in the main entrance and showcase windows of the ground level."
