= Cast Iron Commercial Building =

Building in Los Angeles, California, U.S.

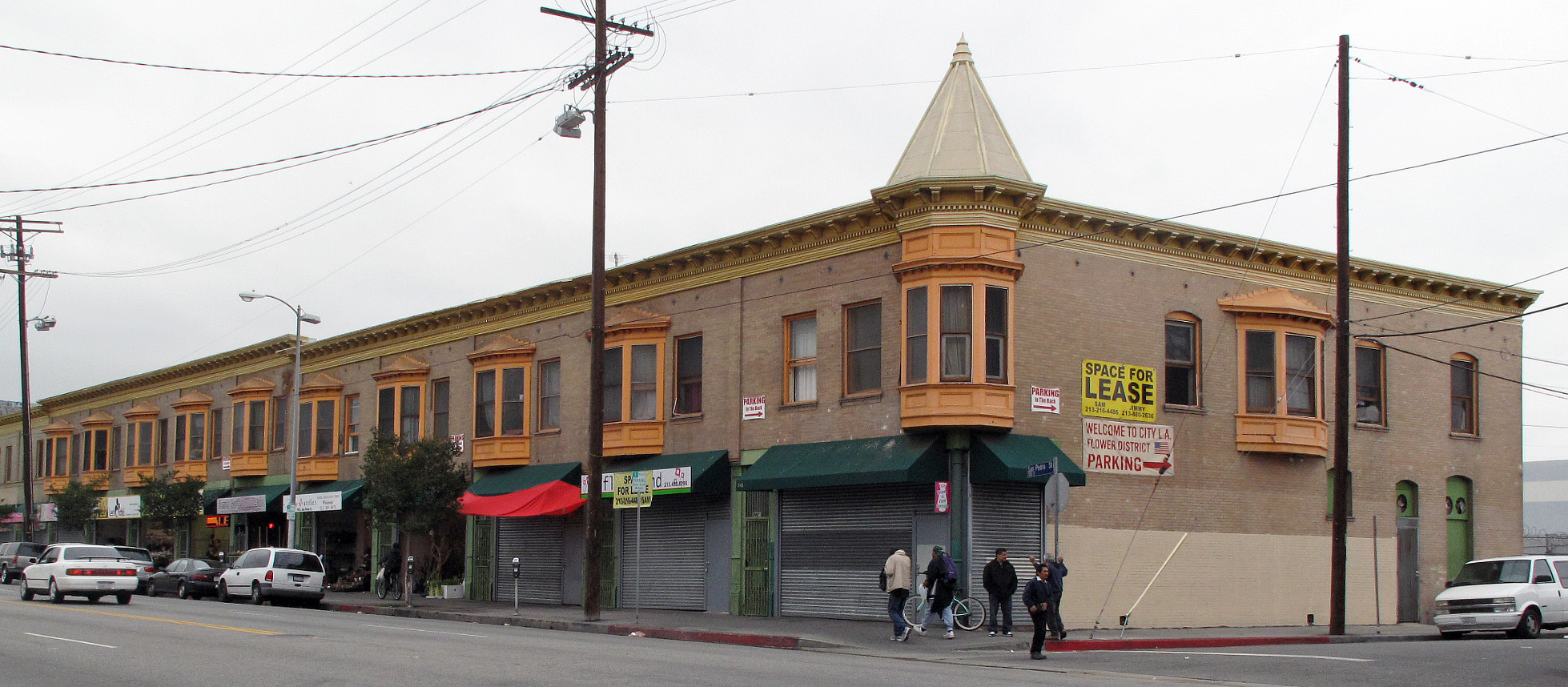
- The building's exterior in 2012
- Interactive map of the Cast Iron Commercial Building area

General information
- Location: Los Angeles, California, United States
- Coordinates: 34°2′22.5″N 118°14′51.5″W

The Cast Iron Commercial Building is an historic building in Los Angeles, California, United States. Built in 1903, the brick structure exhibits Queen Anne architecture with Italianate details. The Cast Iron Commercial Building has been designated a Los Angeles Historic-Cultural Monument.

== See also ==
- List of Los Angeles Historic-Cultural Monuments in Downtown Los Angeles
