= Robert V. Derrah =

American architect

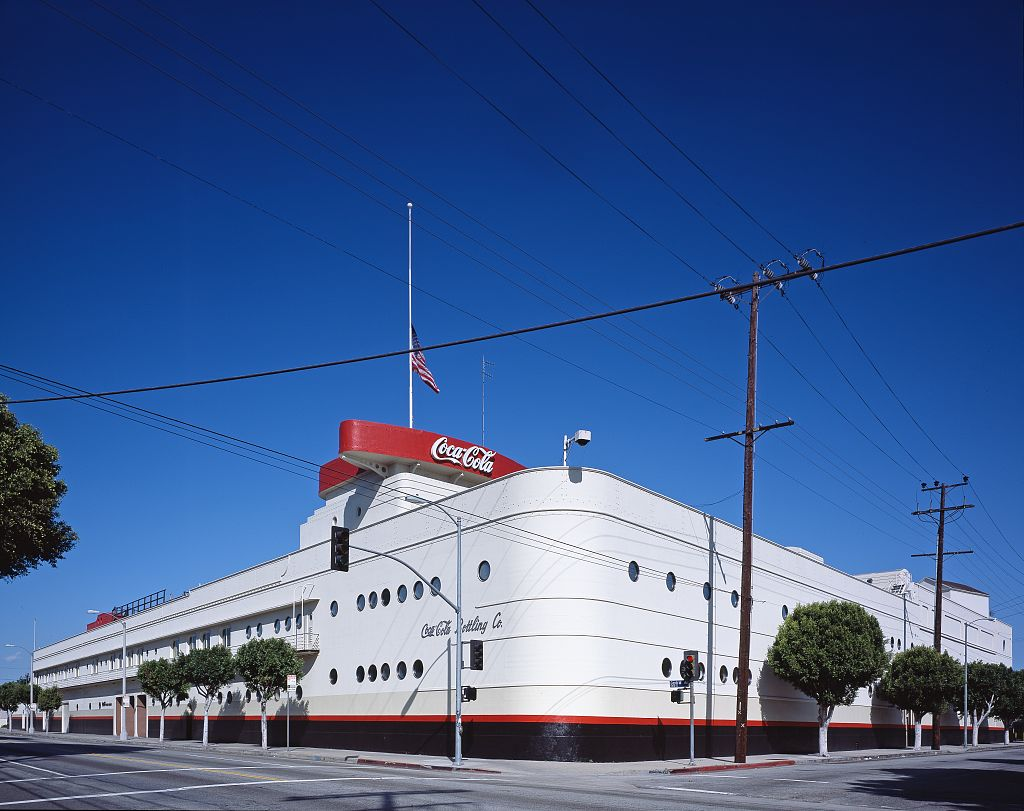
Coca-Cola Building (Los Angeles) (1939), an example of Streamline Moderne architecture

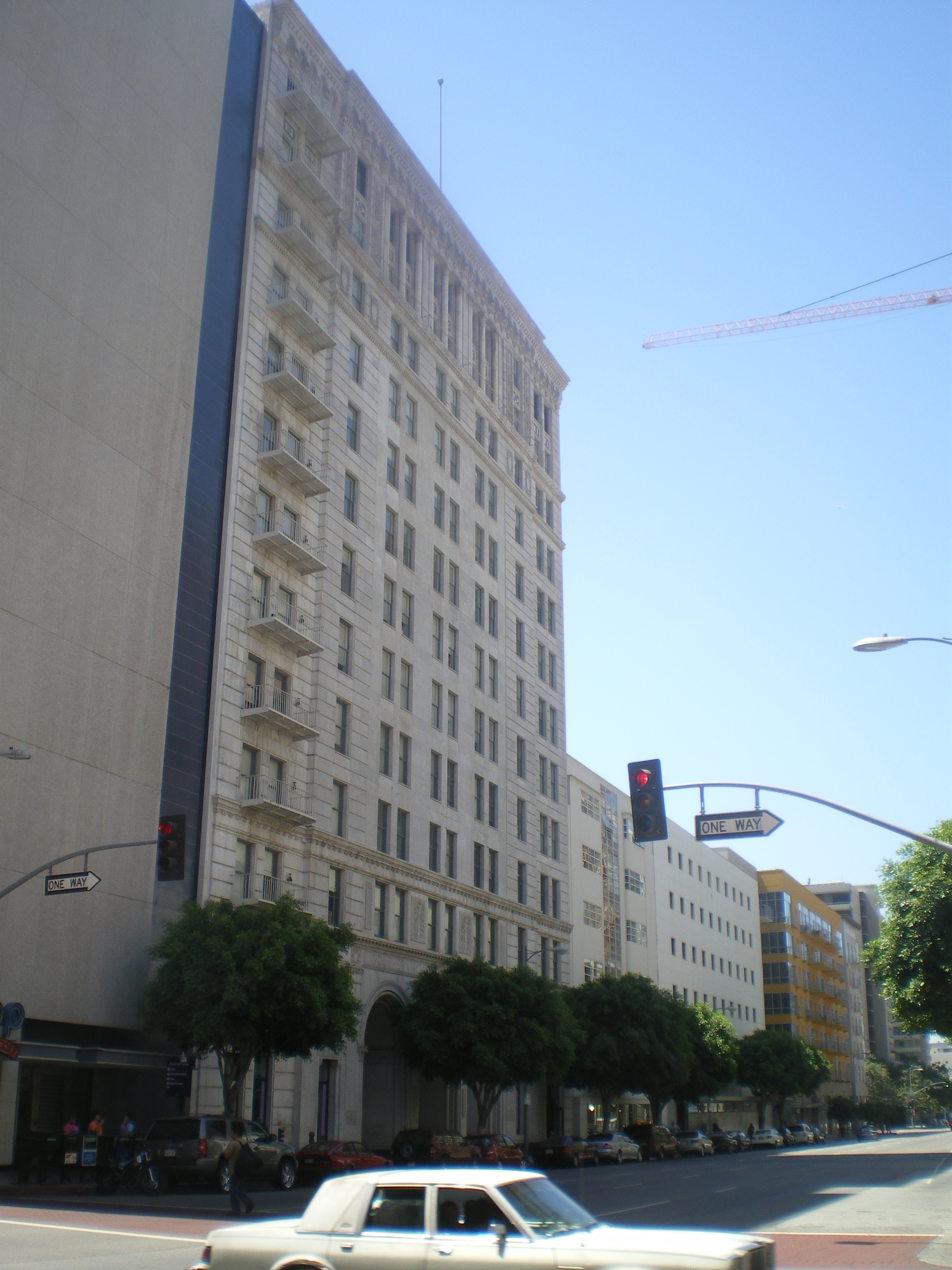
Southern California Gas Company Complex including Derrah's 1942 extension

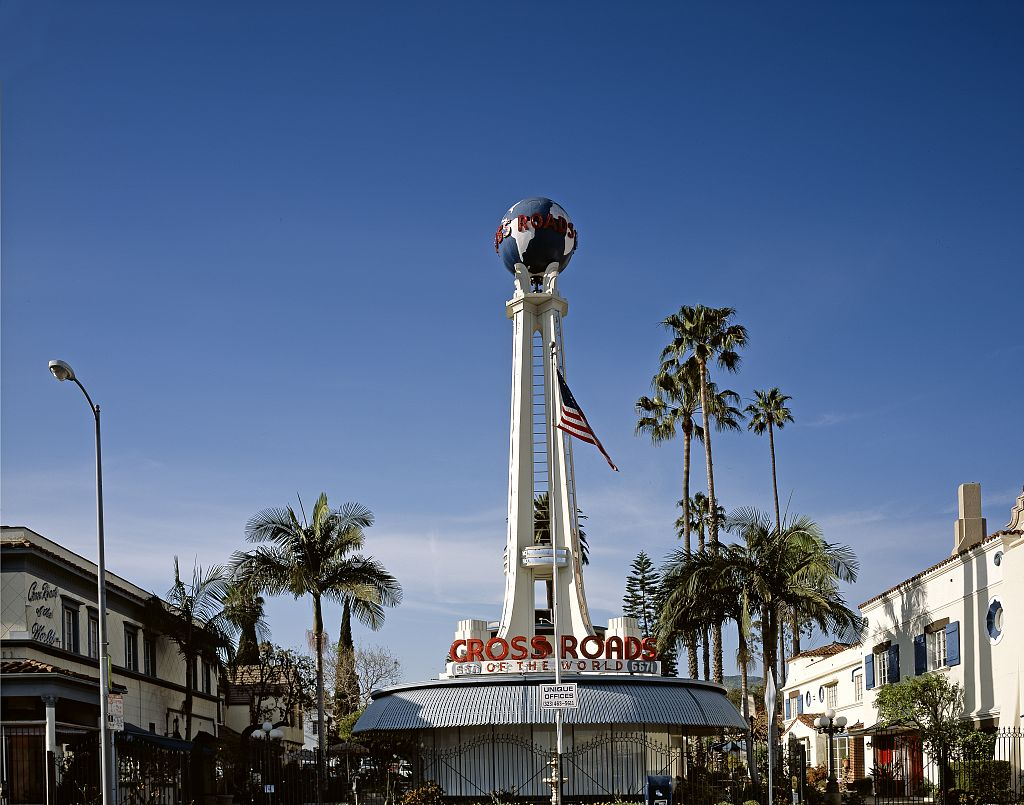
Crossroads of the World in Los Angeles

Robert V. Derrah was an American architect. His work included designs for the Crossroads of the World (1936), Coca-Cola Building (Los Angeles) and a 1942 extension on the Southern California Gas Company Complex.

He died at the age of 51 in 1946.

== Work ==
- Crossroads of the World (1936), one of America's first outdoor shopping malls, 6671 Sunset Boulevard at Las Palmas, Los Angeles. Listed on the National Register of Historic Places.
- Coca-Cola Building (Los Angeles) (1939), 1334 South Central Avenue
- Southern California Gas Company Complex (1942), Art Deco style six story extension at 820 S. Flower Street including two concrete side sections that curve into the recessed glass center.
- five unit Colonial courtyard building (1935) on Durant Drive in Beverly Hills, targeted for demolition
- Mrs. Lillian M. Rose house (1934), a Monterey architecture style house at 842 South Citrus Avenue in Mid-City.
