= Cohn-Goldwater Building =

Building in Los Angeles, California, U.S.

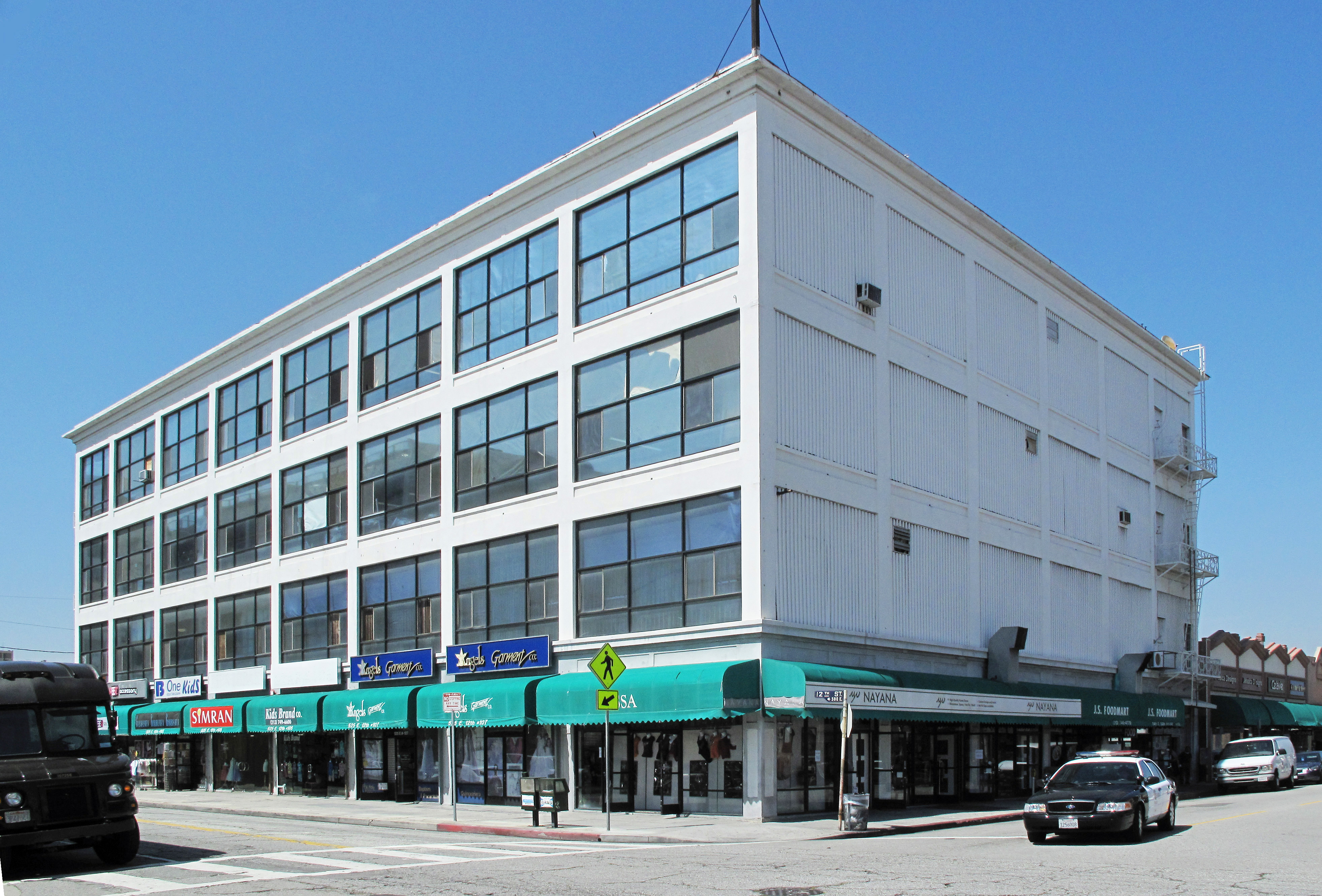
- The building's exterior in 2012
- Interactive map of the Cohn-Goldwater Building area

General information
- Location: Los Angeles, California, United States
- Coordinates: 34°2′5″N 118°15′16″W

The Cohn-Goldwater Building is an historic building in Los Angeles, California, United States. Located at 12th and San Julian Streets (525 East 12th Street), it is "the first modern steel-reinforced concrete factory building in Los Angeles". The Cohn-Goldwater Building has been designated a Los Angeles Historic-Cultural Monument.

== See also ==
- List of Los Angeles Historic-Cultural Monuments in Downtown Los Angeles
