= Crossroads of the World =

- U.S. National Register of Historic Places
- U.S. Historic district
- Los Angeles Historic-Cultural Monument
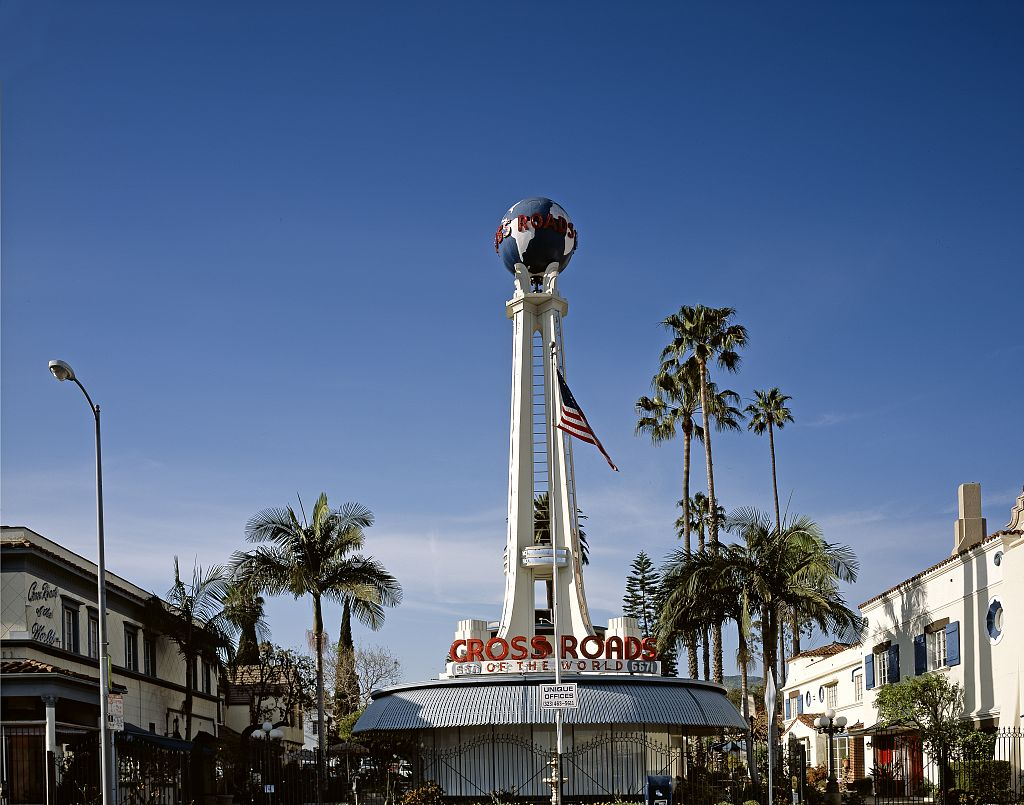
- Crossroads of the World in 2005
- Location: 6671 Sunset Blvd. Los Angeles, California
- Coordinates: 34°5′53.48″N 118°20′8.27″W
- Built: 1936
- Architect: Robert V. Derrah
- NRHP reference No.: 80000805
- LAHCM No.: 134

Significant dates
- Added to NRHP: September 8, 1980
- Designated LAHCM: December 4, 1974

Crossroads of the World is an open-air mall on Sunset Boulevard and Las Palmas in Los Angeles. The mall features a central building designed to resemble an ocean liner surrounded by a small village of cottage-style bungalows. It was designed by Robert V. Derrah, built in 1936, and has been called America's first outdoor shopping mall.

Once a busy shopping center, the Crossroads later became private offices, primarily for the entertainment industry with a variety of music publishers and producers, television and film script writers, film and recording companies, novelists, costume designers, publicists, and casting agencies. The owner is planning a new development surrounding the site.

== History ==
In 1931, after Charles H. Crawford's death, his wife Ella decided to build a multi-national outdoor market that would feel like "a permanent world's fair with a cosmopolitan atmosphere" on the land where her husband was shot. She hired the Streamline Moderne architect Robert V. Derrah (who was finishing his work on the Coca-Cola Building) to design the complex.

Derrah designed a ship-shaped structure in the center of the complex. The surrounding buildings represented different countries of the world. The complex originally held 57 shops and cafes, and 36 offices on the upper floors. The Crossroads of the World was inaugurated on October 29, 1936. The new shopping center was not a full-blown success, but it became an excellent model for outdoors malls across the world.

In the 1950s, the Crossroads of the World was converted into an office complex. The Screen Actors Guild, Crosby, Stills, Nash & Young, Jackson Browne and Alfred Hitchcock used to rent offices there. The property was purchased in 1977 by the real estate investor Mort La Kretz and restored. On June 1, 1985, Michael Perricone founded Interlock Studios, an audio post production facility, which was located in Bungalow 1522 of the complex, until 1998, when it relocated to 6520 Sunset Boulevard, and was sold to Rick Larson a few years later, who renamed it Larson Studios.

In January 2019, the Los Angeles City Council approved the project to revamp the Crossroads of the World in a move to revitalize the district. Three high-rise buildings are planned to bring 950 apartments and condos, a 308-room hotel, and 190,000 square feet (18,000 m^{2}) of commercial space. Preservationists called the redevelopment project a "Manhattanization of Hollywood". Eighty-two Hollywood Regency garden apartments are to be demolished in the project. These rent stabilized apartments are occupied by a decades-old, tight-knit community of largely low-income, predominantly Latino residents. Over 100 apartments in the project will be set aside for very low-income families.

== In popular culture ==
Films:

- The Muppets
- L.A. Confidential
- Indecent Proposal
- The Adventures of Ford Fairlane
- Café Society
- Nancy Drew
- Argo
- Skincare

TV shows:

- Dragnet
- Remington Steele
- Tenspeed and Brown Shoe
- Bosch

Commercials:

- McDonald's
- Ford
- Mattel

Music videos:

- Big Audio Dynamite: The Globe
- The xx: I See You, "I Dare You"

Video games:

- Midnight Club: Los Angeles
- L.A. Noire
- The Crew

=== Reproductions ===
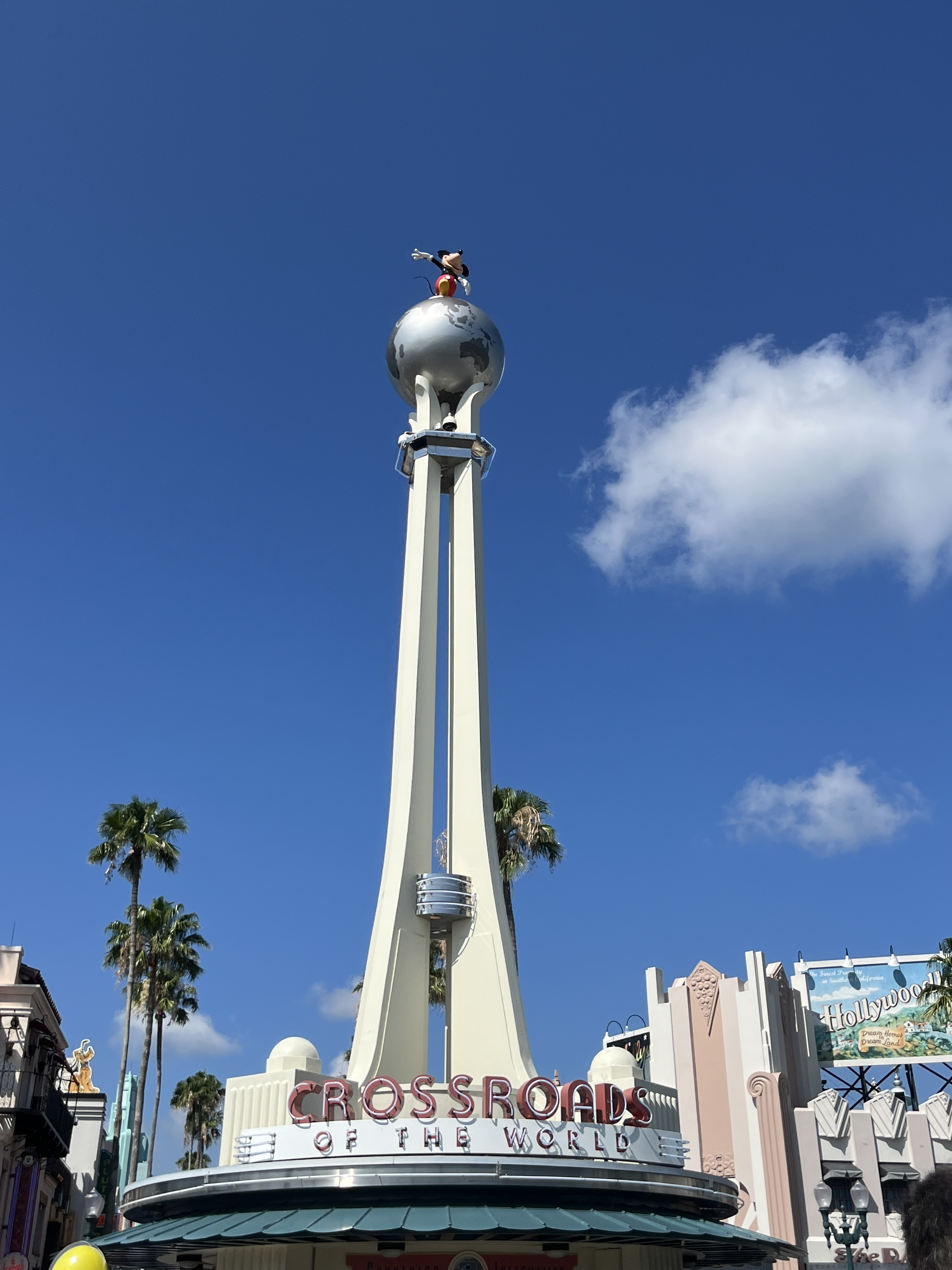
Tower recreation at Disney's Hollywood Studios

A reproduction of Crossroads' iconic tower and spinning globe can be seen just inside the entrance to Disney's Hollywood Studios at Walt Disney World in Florida.

== Gallery ==
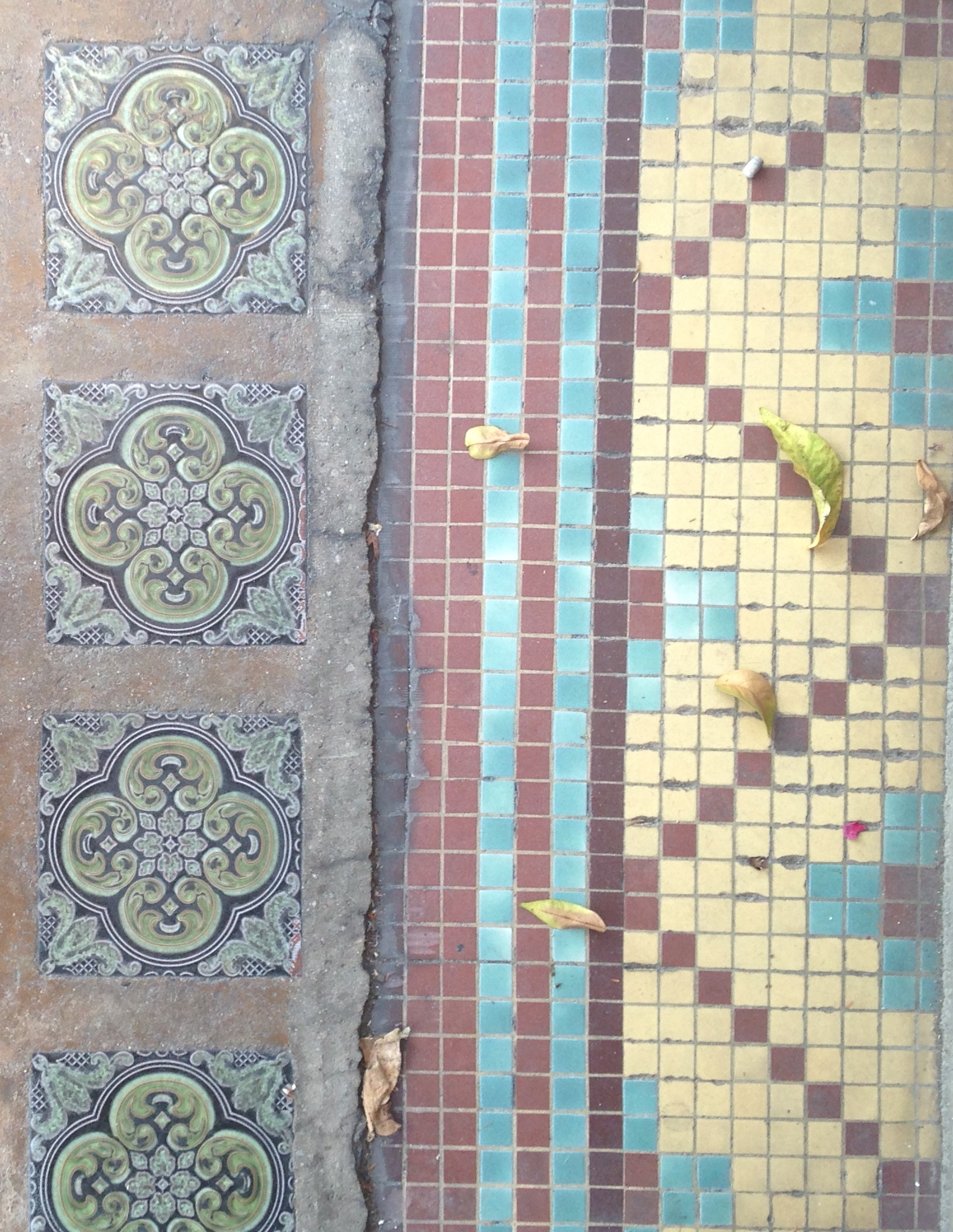
Tile detail

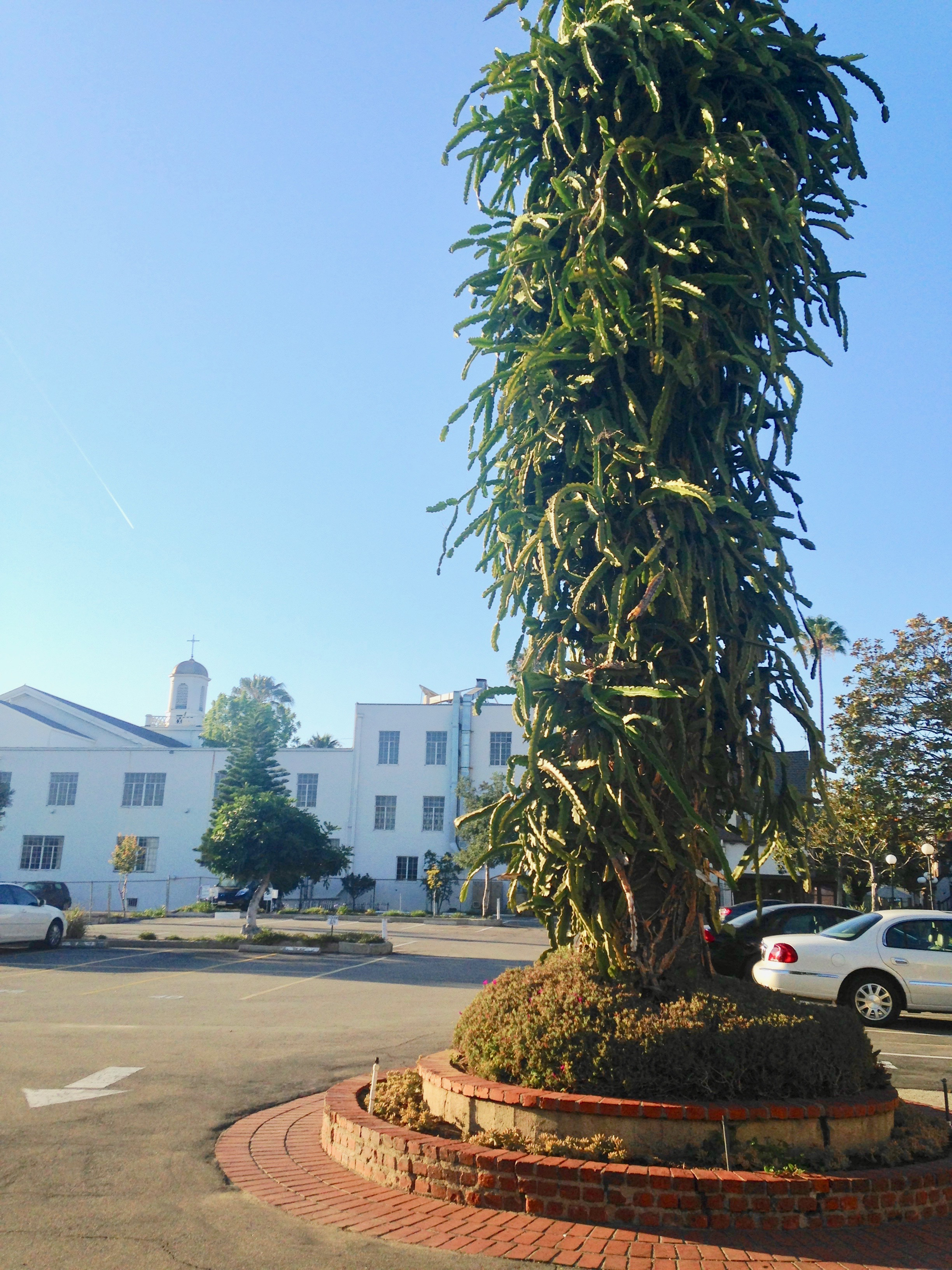
Overgrown foliage

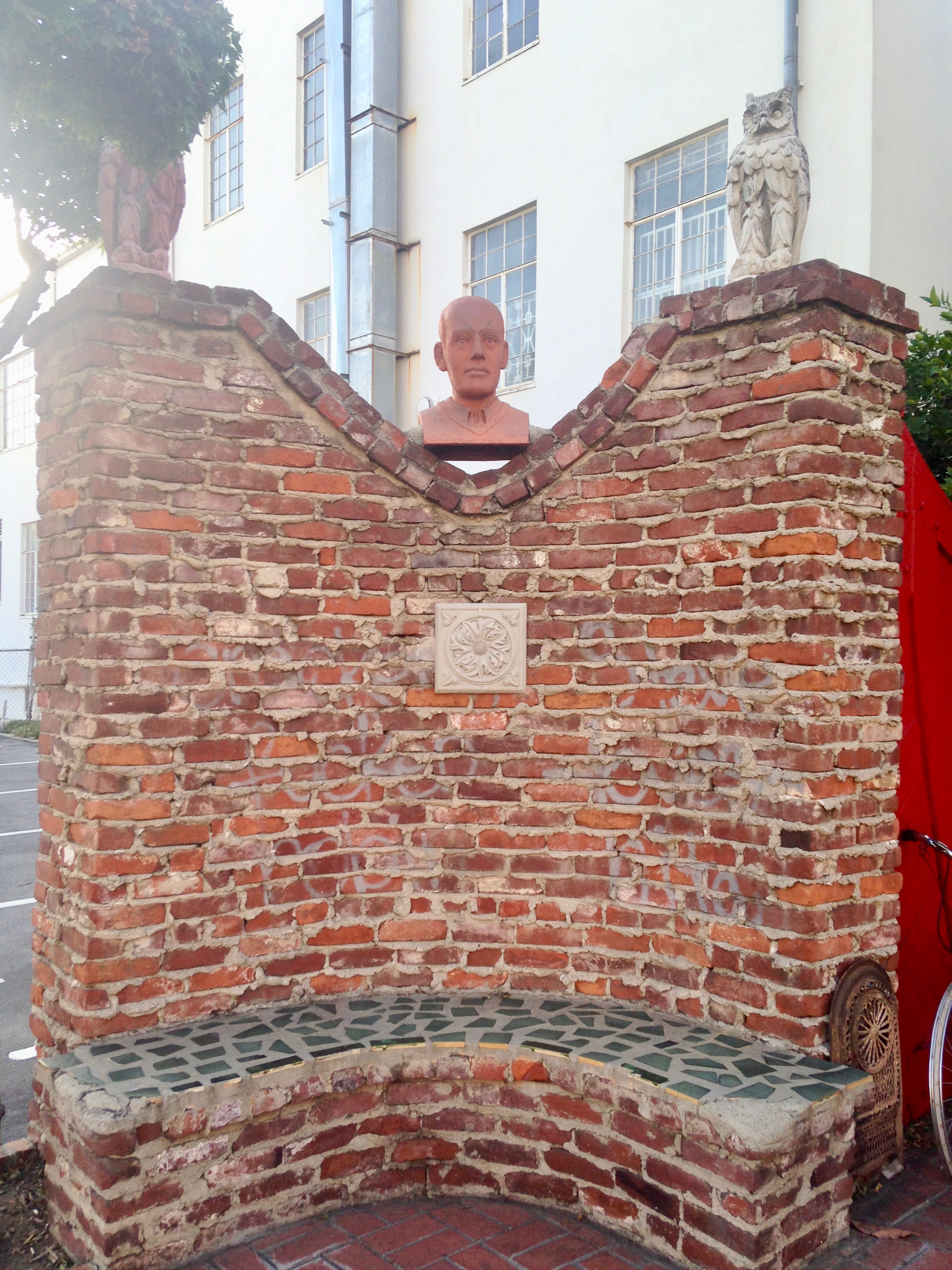
Bench

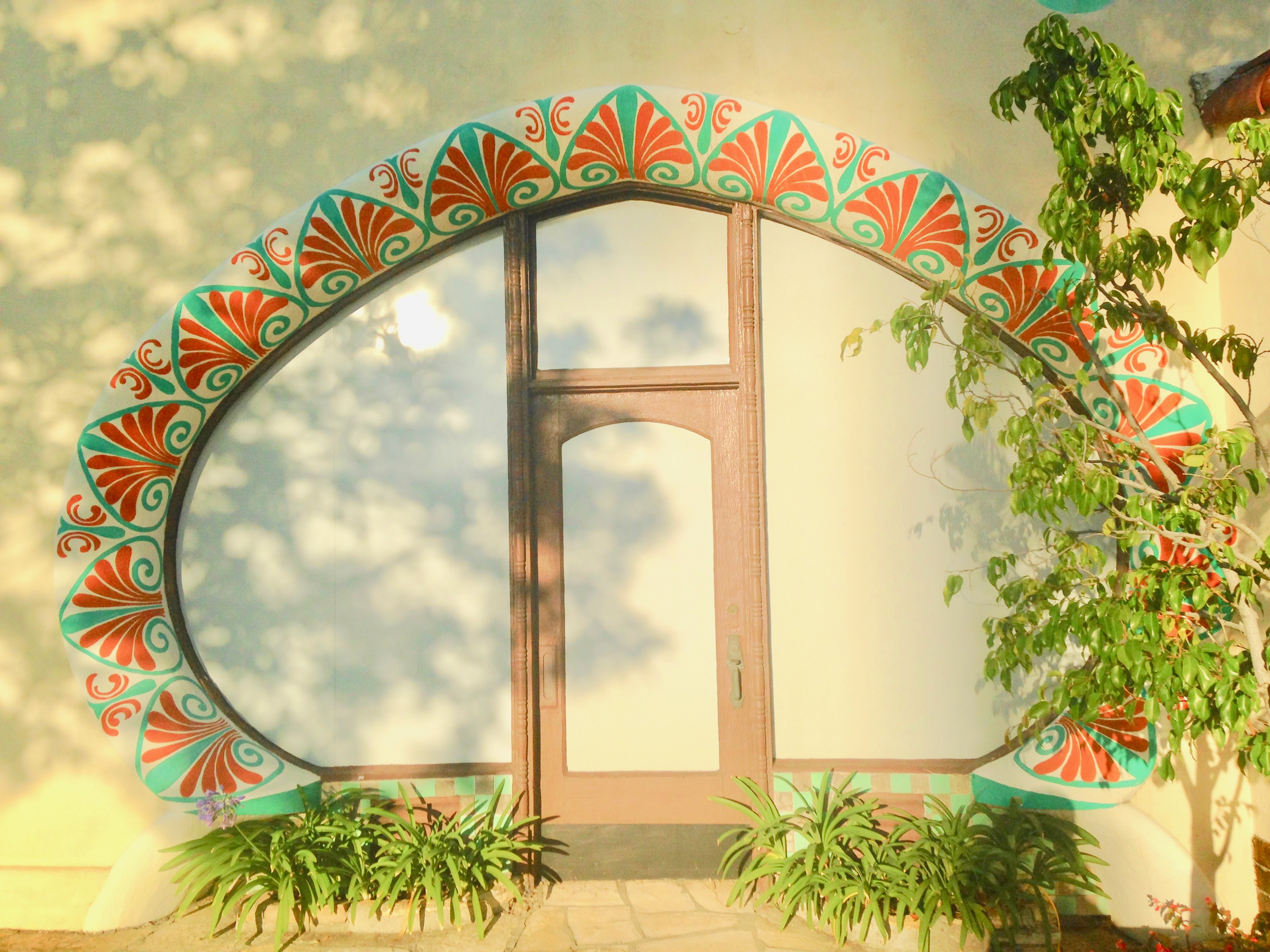
Moorish doorway

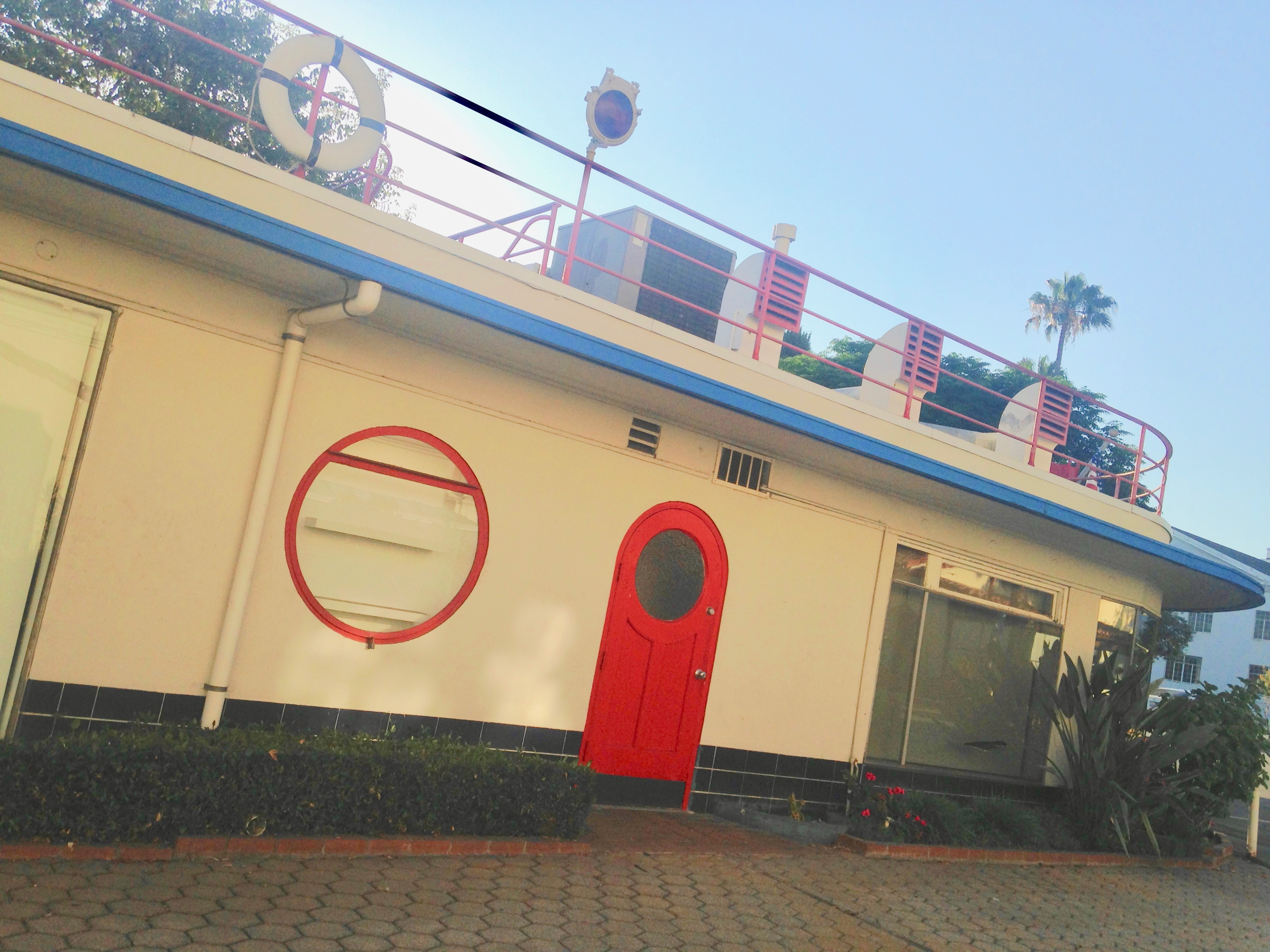
Streamline Moderne building

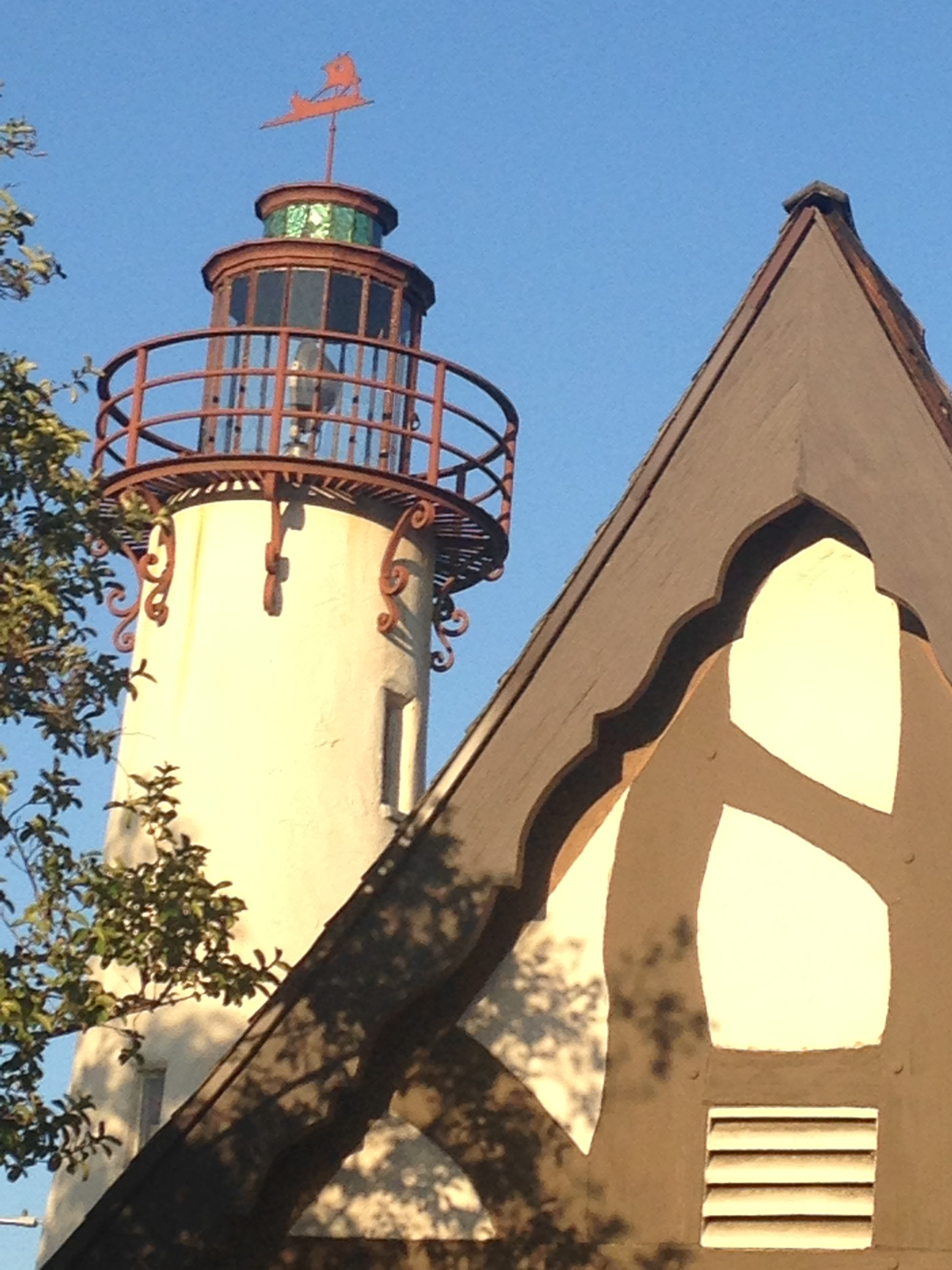
Scandinavian-inspired cottage and a faux lighthouse

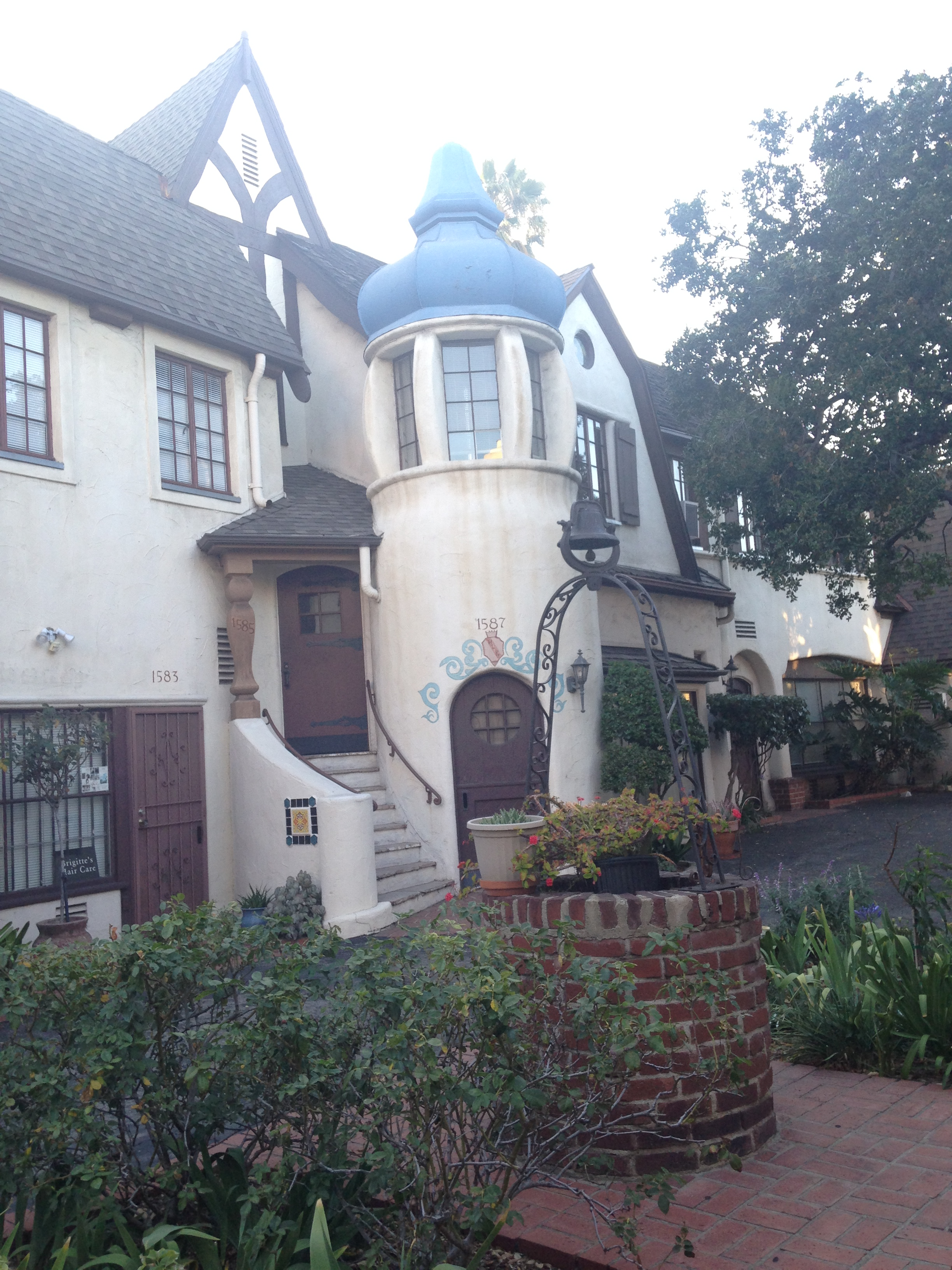
Fantasy architecture

== See also ==
- Los Angeles Historic-Cultural Monuments in Hollywood
- List of Registered Historic Places in Los Angeles
