= Southern California Gas Company Complex =

- U.S. National Register of Historic Places
- Los Angeles Historic-Cultural Monument
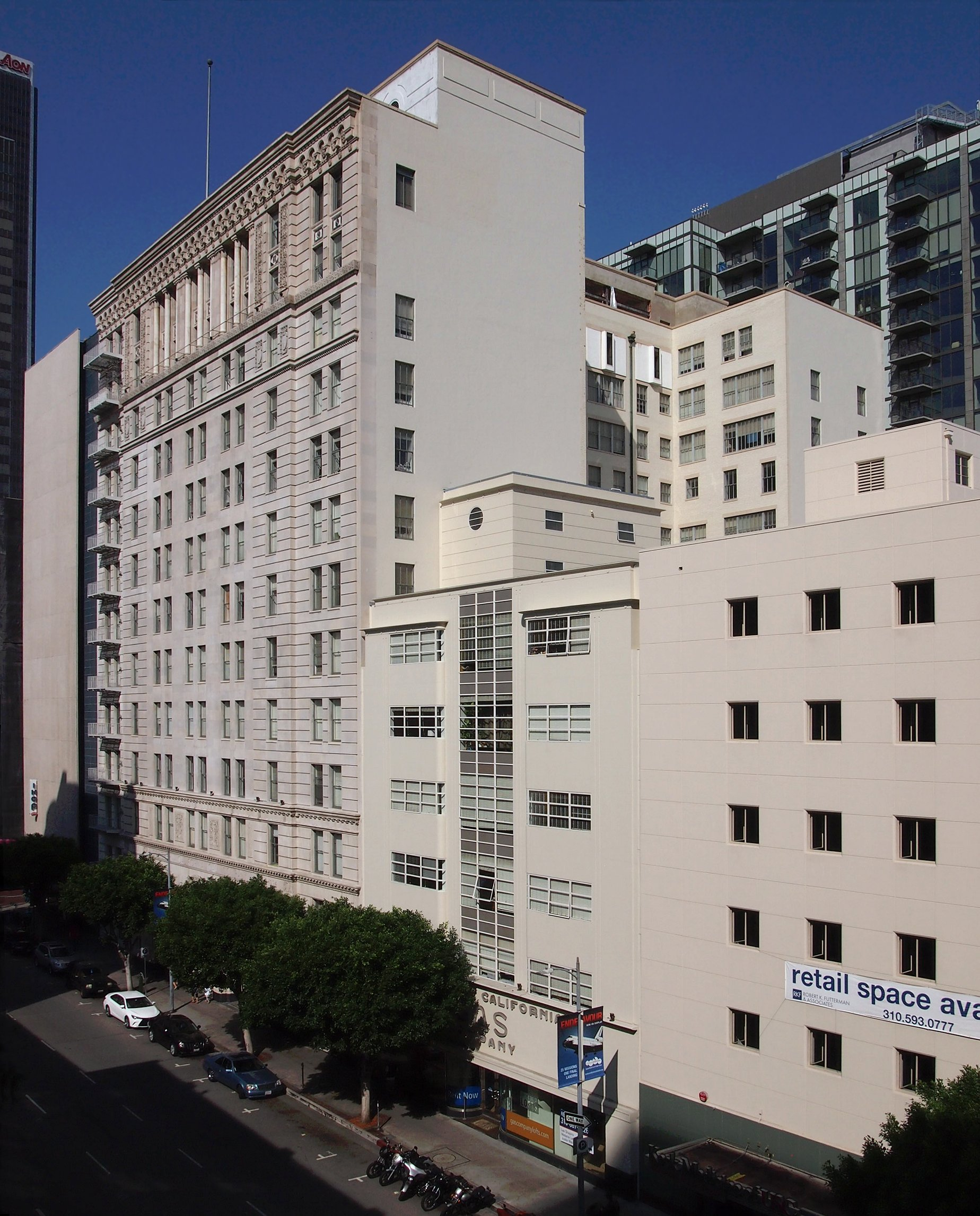
- The Southern California Gas Company Complex from the west

- Location within the Los Angeles metropolitan area Location within California Location within the United States
- Location: 800-830 S. Flower St., Los Angeles, California
- Coordinates: 34°2′48″N 118°15′37″W
- Built: 1925
- Architect: Parkinson & Parkinson; et al.
- Architectural style: Renaissance, Moderne
- NRHP reference No.: 04000623
- LAHCM No.: 789
- Added to NRHP: June 22, 2004

The Southern California Gas Company Complex is a group of buildings on Flower Street in Downtown Los Angeles. The main building, completed in 1925, was designed in the Renaissance Revival style by John and Donald Parkinson.

It was originally used as offices by the Southern California Gas Company, but was later converted to lofts.

The six story extension at 820 S. Flower Street was designed by Robert V. Derrah in the Art Deco architecture style in 1942. The two concrete side sections curve into a recessed glass center.

The buildings were added to the National Register of Historic Places in 2004.

== See also ==
- National Register of Historic Places listings in Los Angeles, California
