= Foreman & Clark =

Departmental store chain

Foreman & Clark was a department store chain headquartered in downtown Los Angeles, California, United States. Founded in 1909, the chain had 90 stores by 1957, from California to New York, and closed in 1999.

The chain was known for placing stores above street level, where rents were cheaper. Foreman & Clark began as a men's store, in 1909 on Third and Main Streets in downtown Los Angeles. By 1920 it owned three factories, in New Jersey and New York; and stores in San Diego, Oakland, San Francisco, Chicago, Kansas City and Pittsburgh. All the stores were upstairs.

A Foreman brother owned a chain of 14 Foreman and Clark stores in the Midwest. Headquartered in Minneapolis and Saint Paul, MN.

Living Relatives of the deceased business: Eric Foreman, Clare Foreman, Christian Foreman company

== See also ==
- Foreman & Clark Building, a building in downtown Los Angeles that housed a flagship store and corporate offices
- List of defunct retailers of the United States
- 1992 TV commercial
