= Coca-Cola Building (Los Angeles) =

Historic beverage bottling facility in Los Angeles, California

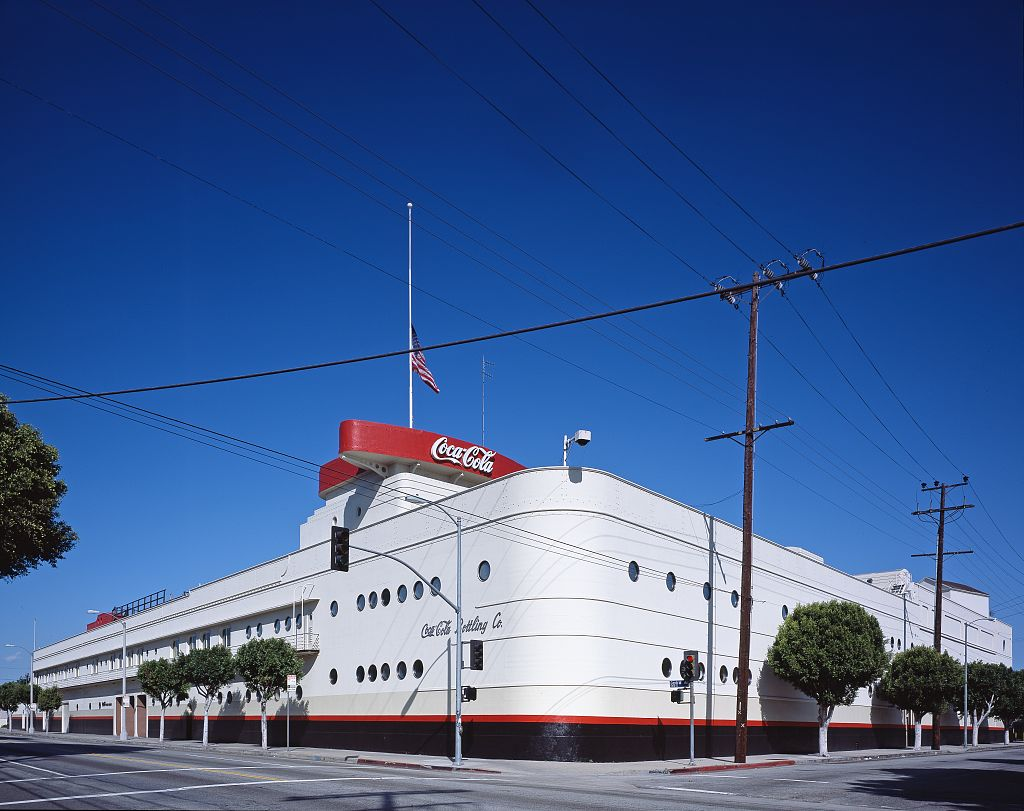
- View from corner

- Location within the Los Angeles metropolitan area
- 34°1′43″N 118°14′42″W
- Location: 1200-1334 South Central Avenue, Los Angeles, California

History
- Built: 1939; 87 years ago

Site notes
- Area: Downtown Los Angeles / South Los Angeles
- Architect: Robert V. Derrah
- Architectural style: Streamline Moderne
- Governing body: Private

Los Angeles Historic-Cultural Monument
- Designated: February 5, 1975
- Reference no.: 138

The Coca-Cola Building is a Coca-Cola bottling plant modeled as a Streamline Moderne building designed by architect Robert V. Derrah with the appearance of a ship with portholes, catwalk and a bridge from five existing industrial buildings in 1939. It is located at 1334 South Central Avenue in Los Angeles, California. It was designated Los Angeles Historic-Cultural Monument No. 138 on February 5, 1975.

== Precursor ==
A previous Coca Cola bottling plant was built by Richard D. King in 1920. This building was demolished in the 1930s, with the current Coca-Cola Building built on the same property.

== See also ==
- List of Los Angeles Historic-Cultural Monuments in Downtown Los Angeles
