= Foreman & Clark Building =

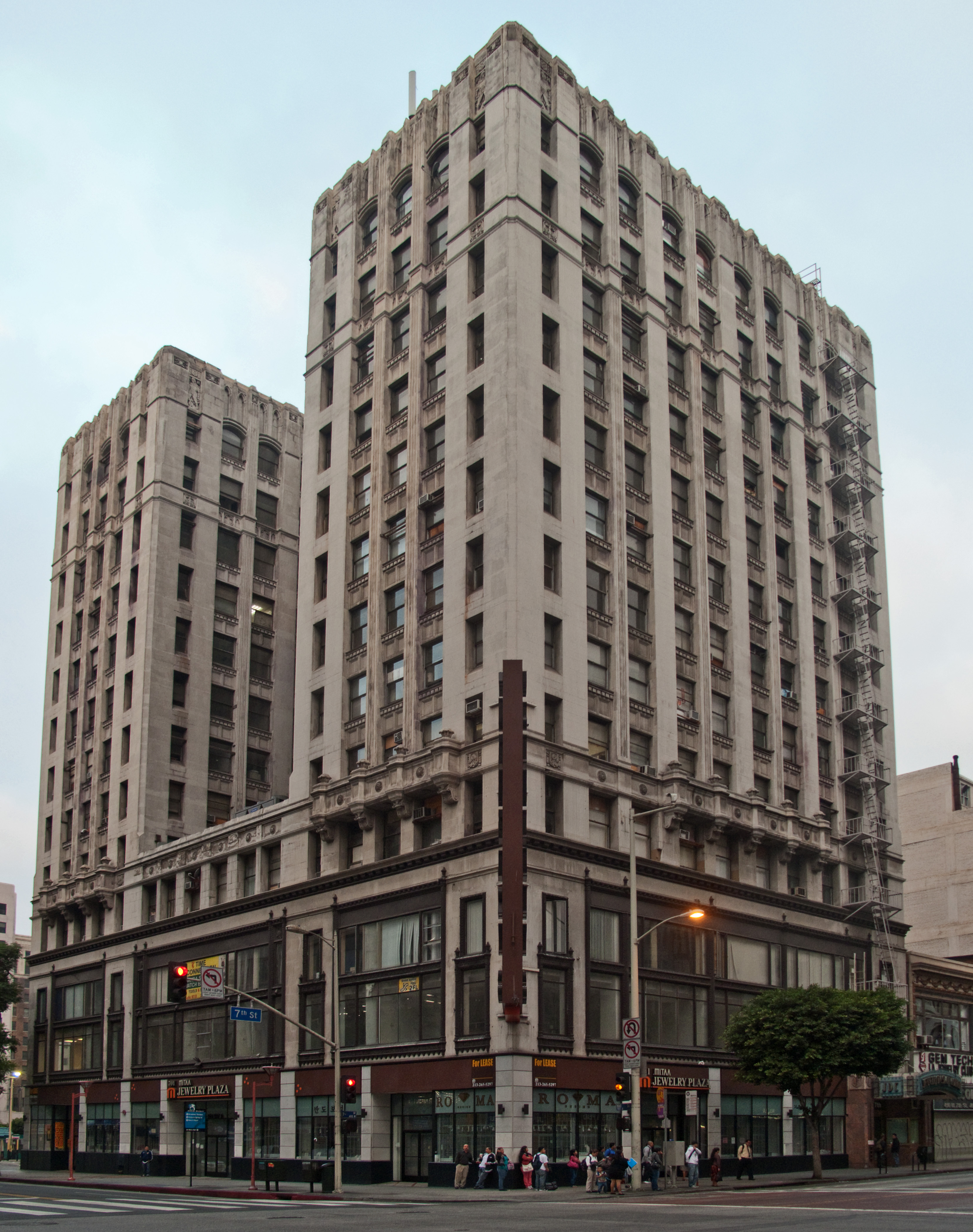
- The Foreman & Clark Building in 2013
- Interactive map of the Foreman & Clark Building area

General information
- Type: Building
- Location: 701 South Hill Street, Los Angeles, California, United States
- Coordinates: 34.0458°N 118.2549°W
- Completed: 1929
- Owner: Bonnis Properties

Technical details
- Floor count: 13

The Foreman & Clark Building is a historic building on the corner of Hill Street and 7th Street in Downtown Los Angeles, California, U.S.. It was built in 1929 to host the flagship store and corporate offices for clothing retailer Foreman & Clark, which occupied the building until the 1960s. The building, designed by the architectural firm of Curlett & Beelman, combines elements of Art Deco and Gothic architecture.

The building was purchased in March 2016 by Bonnis Properties, a Canadian development company, for $52 million, and the former office space will be covered into apartments.

The building was named a Los Angeles Historic-Cultural Monument in 2009.
