= Los Angeles Fashion District =

District of downtown Los Angeles, California

- District of downtown Los Angeles
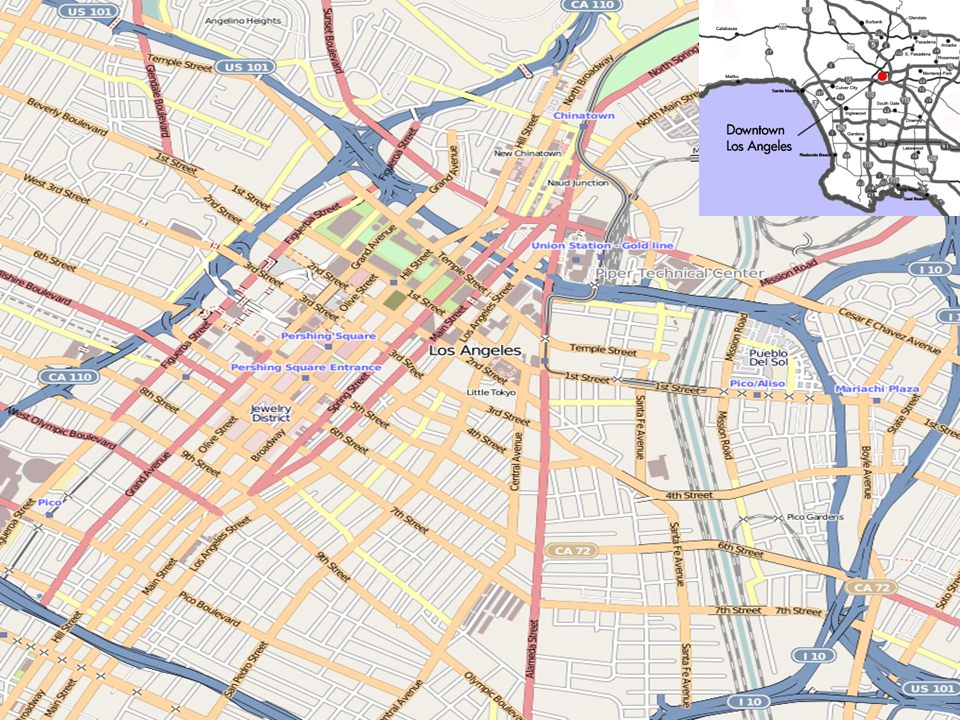
- Location within Downtown Los Angeles
- Coordinates: 34.037168°N 118.256404°W
- Country: United States
- State: California
- County: County of Los Angeles
- City: Los Angeles
- Area code: 213
- Website: https://fashiondistrict.org

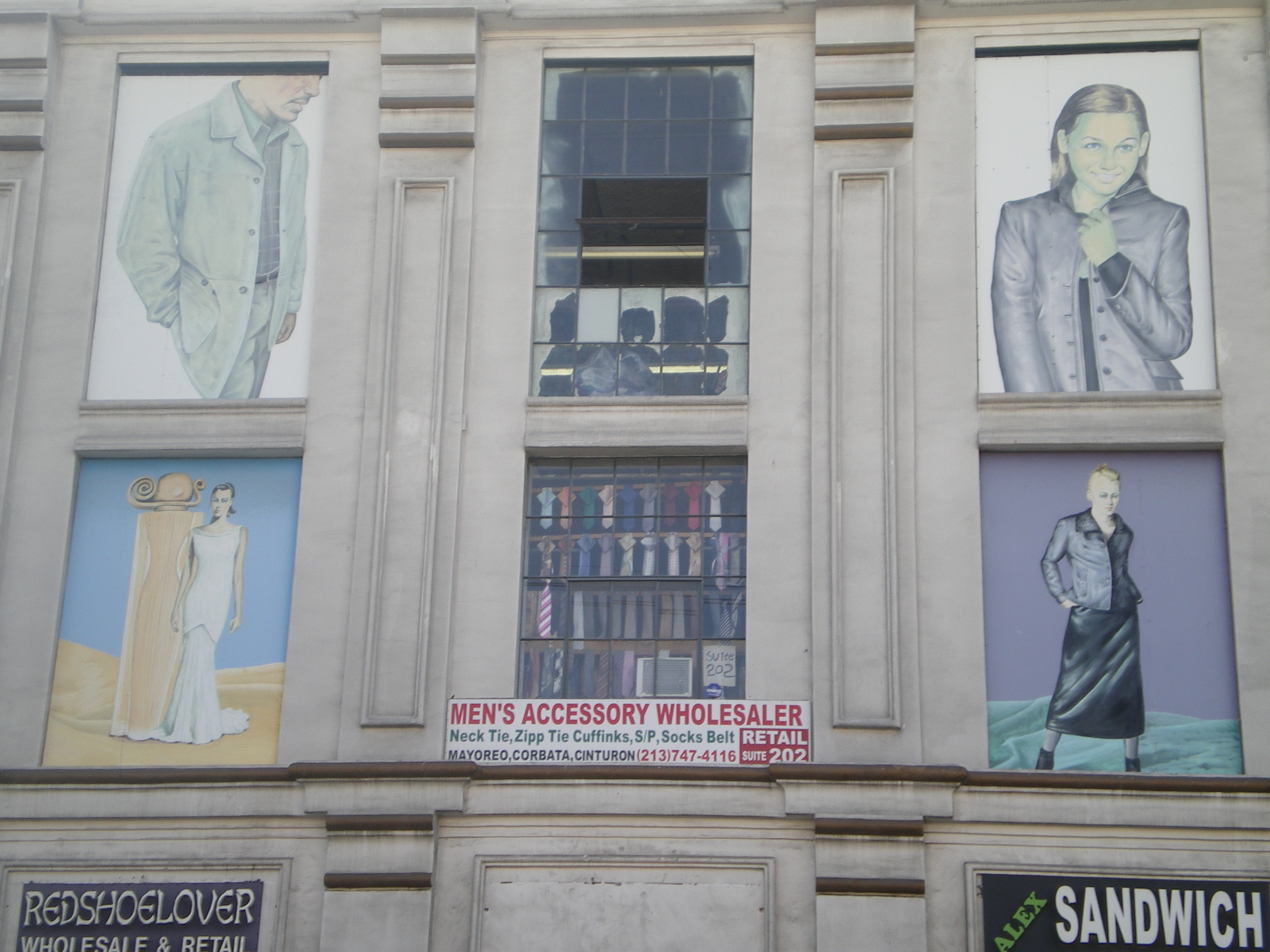
Fashion District, Pico & Santee

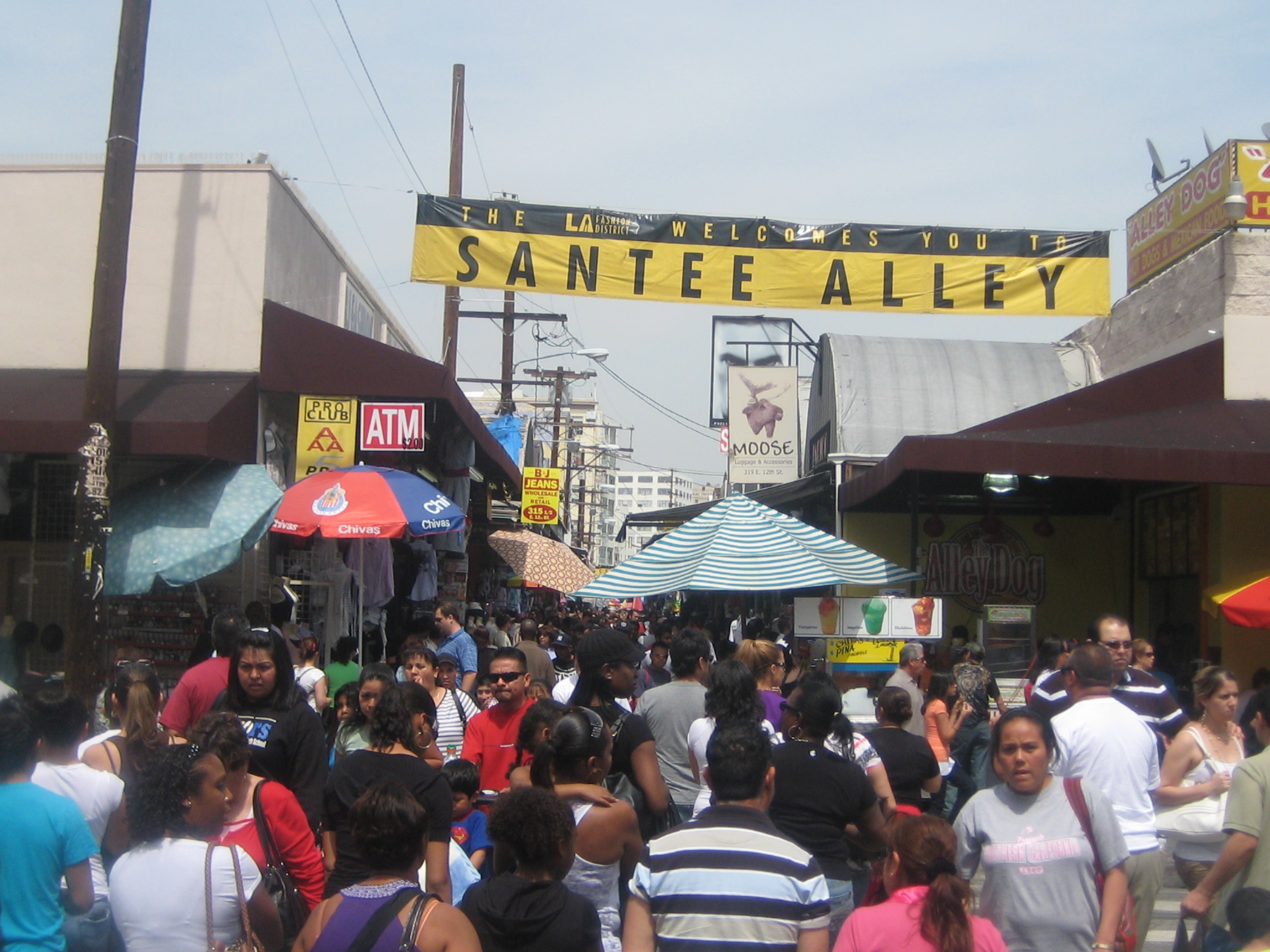
Santee Alley Bazaar

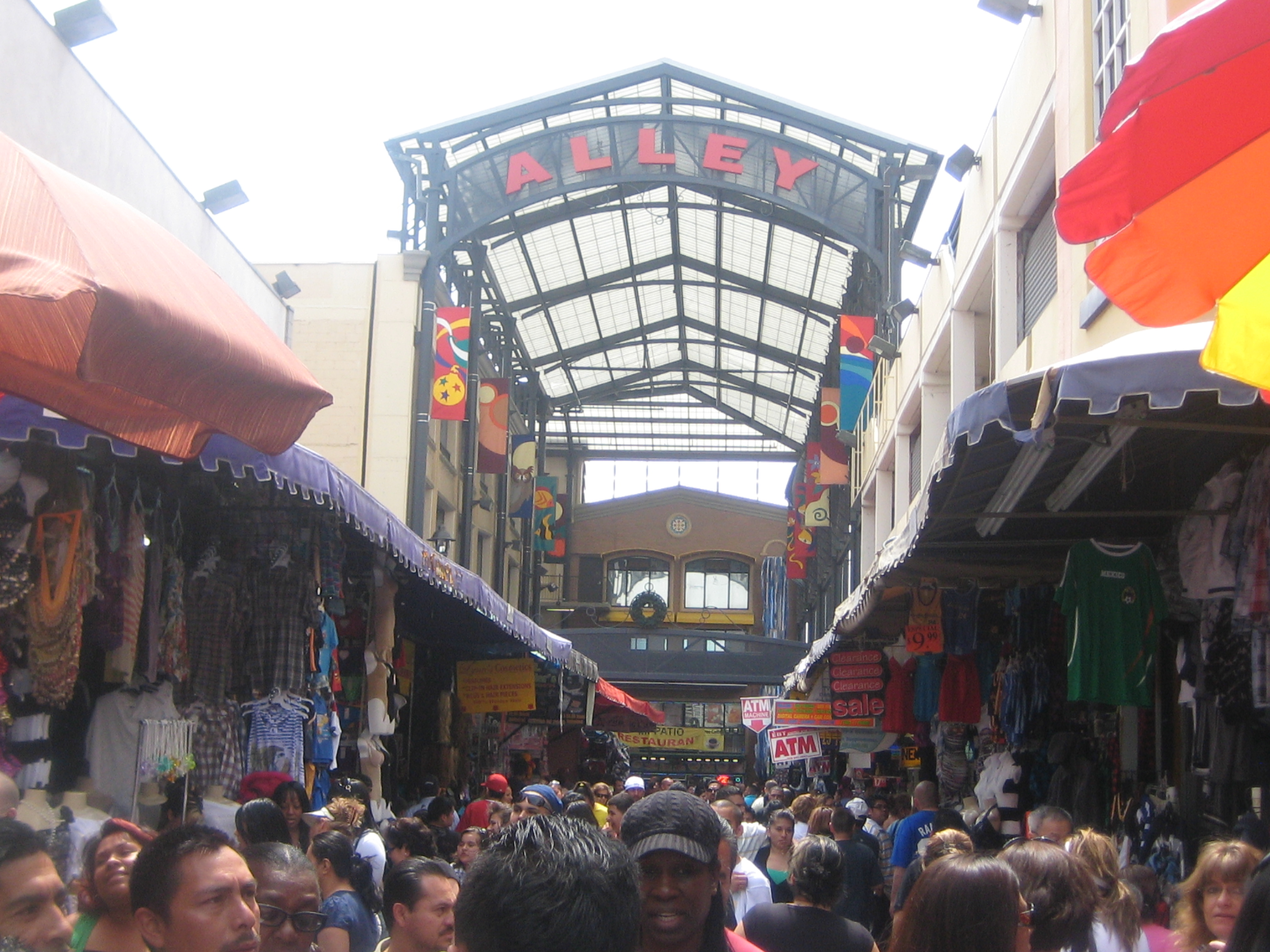
Southern end of Santee Alley

The Los Angeles Fashion District, previously known as the Garment District, is a business improvement district (BID) in, and often cited as a sub-neighborhood of, downtown Los Angeles. The neighborhood caters to wholesale selling and has more than 4,000 overwhelmingly independently owned and operated retail and wholesale businesses selling apparel, footwear, accessories, and fabrics.

== Status and boundaries ==
The fashion district has no official, government-recognized status.

It is recognized as a subdistrict of downtown by the Downtown Los Angeles Neighborhood Council (DLANC), which states its boundaries as:

- to the west, Main Street
- to the south, Washington Blvd. (west of Alameda Street) and 26th St. (east of Alameda St.)
- to the east, the Los Angeles River (DLANC definition) or by the fashion district's definition, Paloma Street, three blocks east of San Pedro Street.
- to the north, generally 7th St. and Skid Row and the Arts District

In earlier documents, the DLANC defined the eastern parts of what it now terms the fashion district as the warehouse district, produce district, and southern industrial district.

== History ==
The identification of a "garment district" is relatively new in Los Angeles' history as a large city. In 1972 the Los Angeles Times defined the garment district as being along Los Angeles Street from 3rd to 11th Street, an area that today straddles the border of Skid Row and the very northwest end of the current fashion district. At the time, the newspaper stated that 2,000 garment manufacturers were located in that area, which was "virtually unknown to most Los Angeles residents".

By 1982 the district was a roughly 20 block area from Maple to Main and 7th to 12th streets and had become a popular place for Angelenos to seek fashions at cheaper prices. There were about 500 retail outlets, and key destinations for shoppers included the Cooper Building, the Fashion Center Building and "The Alley", now known as Santee Alley.

Workers are mostly Latin American and Asian immigrants.

== BID organization ==
The Los Angeles Fashion District BID states that it "has pioneered a collaborative effort among area stakeholders that continues to foster a clean, safe, and vibrant environment for everyone who experiences the district. We are promoting increased business activity, enhancing property values, and attracting further investment in the area.". It is 1 of 9 BIDs in Downtown LA and 1 of over 40 BIDs in the City of Los Angeles. A binding assessment levied on property owners funds BID activities, and a 15-member Board of Directors elected by district property owners oversees the organization.

== Points of interest ==
- Santee Alley, 210 E. Olympic Boulevard
- FIDM, 919 S. Grand Avenue

== Links ==
- Milano Fashion District
