= George Frederick Frye =

One of Seattle's first developers and businessmen

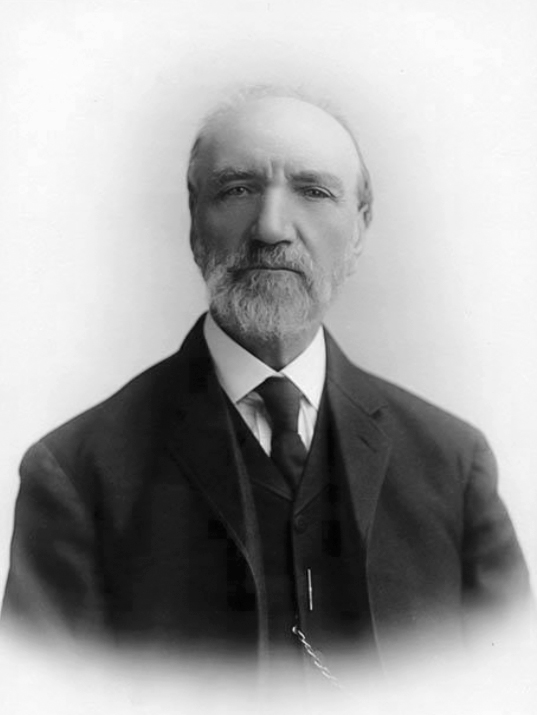
- 1910 portrait
- Born: June 15, 1833; Drachenburg, Germany
- Died: May 2, 1912 (aged 78); Seattle, Washington, U.S.
- Burial place: Lake View Cemetery
- Occupations: Businessman; member of the Seattle City Council; captain of the J. B. Libby steamer; construction supervisor for Hotel Barker
- Years active: 1853–1912
- Organization: The Pioneers Association
- Known for: One of Seattle's first developers and businessmen. Developed a number of businesses in the city and contributed to the city's layout by building the Frye Opera House, the Hotels Stevens and Barker, and the Hotel Frye.
- Political party: Republican
- Spouse: Louisa C. Denny (married 1860 – 1912)
- Children: 6

George Frederick Frye (June 15, 1833 – May 2, 1912) was one of Seattle's first developers and businessmen and an active City Council member. He played a significant role in Seattle's conversion from a small settlement into a modern city.

Frye developed bakery, butcher, and lumber businesses in the city. With Seattle founders Arthur A. Denny and Henry L. Yesler, he established the first sawmill and grist mill of the city.

Frye erected a number of significant Seattle buildings. His first building was the Frye Opera House, which burned down during the Great Seattle Fire in 1889. On its site, Frye erected a new five-story brick building, Hotel Stevens. At the site of the Frye family house, he erected Hotel Barker. One of Frye's most-known buildings was his last one: the eleven-story fireproof Hotel Frye.

Frye crossed the American Plains at the age of sixteen and survived the 1846–1860 cholera pandemic. He was one of the first people to volunteer to serve during the Indian war in 1855.

== Early life ==
Frye was born on June 15, 1833, in Drachenburg, Germany (near Hanover). His parents were Otto Frye and Sophia Frye (Pranga), both German citizens and members of the Lutheran church. Frye's father participated in local municipal affairs and was a burgomaster in his native community. Otto and Sophia had ten children; George outlived all of his nine siblings.

== Immigration and the journey to Oregon ==
In 1849, at the age of sixteen, Frye sailed to America. He lived for three years with his sister in Lafayette County, Missouri, working on a farm. In 1852, he took off for Portland, Oregon. With a group of about 100 people, Frye crossed the Great American Plains driving his own ox team.

Frye's party started their journey around May 7, equipped with mule and ox teams. According to multiple sources, Frye was good at handling his ox team and was helpful to others on the road. With a fellow traveler, Thomas Prather, Frye was obliged to look after the leaders' (Judge Gilmore Hayes and Andrew Cowan) gold pieces and newly purchased cattle.

A cholera epidemic complicated the trip, killing around 40 people. Frye also suffered from it, though he was not as sick as others. He was dedicated to his post and kept driving his team.

By October, they reached The Dalles, Oregon. Frye continued his journey to Portland to spend the winter.

== Life and career in Seattle ==
In spring of 1853, with travel mates Hillary Butler (for whom the Butler Hotel was named) and Thomas Prather, Frye moved to Olympia, Washington. Shortly after they arrived in Seattle, a small settlement at the time. They worked in the logging business briefly, and then Frye was hired by Henry Yesler to work in the mill, where he stated for three or four years.

Frye became one of the first Seattle businessmen. His first business purchase was Terry's (of Terry & Green) Eureka Bakery in 1869, which he soon sold.

Frye opened the first meat market in Seattle, and, together with Arthur A. Denny and H. L. Yesler, established the first sawmill and grist mill. Around the same time, he worked in the transportation business as captain of the J. B. Libby (the early Sound steamer) with a side job delivering mail from Seattle to Whatcom. He was an active member of the City Council and supported the Republican political party. He was credited as founder of Seattle's first brass band, and even acted as the first Santa Claus during one of the earliest Christmas celebrations in the city. He was a charter member and trustee of the Pioneers Association. In 1855, Frye was one of the first volunteers to actively serve in the Indian war.

=== Frye's architectural legacy ===
Frye's first building, and the first building in Seattle deserving a name, was the Frye Opera House. This building was a meeting place for organizations, including the "Opera House Party" during the times of Anti-Chinese agitation in America. It held valuable papers, such as the records of the first days of Seattle Lodge No. 92 Benevolent and Protective Order of Elks, which were burnt along with the building during the Great Seattle Fire of 1889.

Soon after fire destroyed the building, Frye, despite being ill, announced he had let the contract for a new opera house. Frye decided to build a five-story brick structure–the Hotel Stevens, on the site of the burnt building.

Another of Frye's buildings was the family house on the corner of Pike Street and 6th Avenue. The Frye family occupied it for forty years, until the house was razed in 1905. In its place, Frye erected a seven-story brick and terra cotta building of steel construction: the Hotel Barker, also known as the "M and A Building" in honor of Frye's deceased sons, Marion and Arthur. The building fronted Pike Street and had a private alley at the rear. On the inside, it had modern fire stairs, passenger and freight elevators, a basement under the first-floor stores, and single rooms that could be connected into suites on demand.

Another of Frye's biggest contributions to the city and personal achievements was his last building, the eleven-story fireproof Hotel Frye (also known as the Louisa C. Frye Building in honor of Frye's wife). Construction began in 1908 on the 3rd Avenue South and Yesler Way, in cooperation with architects Bebb & Mendel, who had worked on the Hotel Barker. At the age of seventy-seven Frye personally supervised construction. He had been determined to build it for years, though had been held back by other 3rd Avenue property owners. The building opened on April 6, 1911.

For some time, Frye was a co-owner of the Northern Hotel together with another Seattle founder, Arthur A. Denny.

== Personal life ==
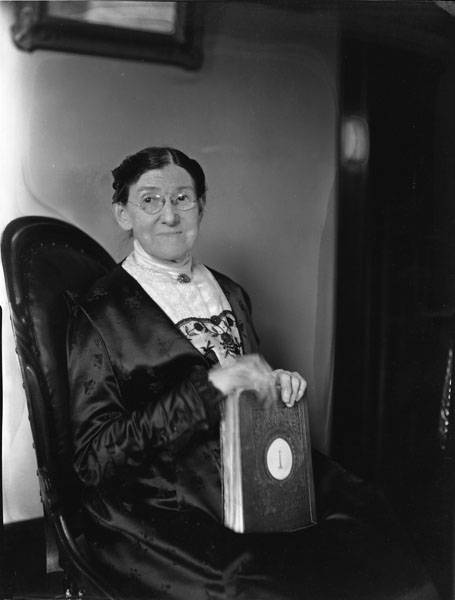
Louisa C. Denny in 1919.

George Frye married Louisa Catherine Denny, daughter of Arthur A. Denny, on October 25, 1860, in Seattle. In their early married life, the couple lived in a cabin situated on the site of the future Stevens Hotel. Thereafter, Frye built their home on Pike Street, where forty years later the Hotel Barker was erected.

In 1911, the couple celebrated their 50th marriage anniversary as one of the first couples to have been married in Seattle.

The Fryes had six children: James Marion, who died in 1905, leaving a wife and two children; Mary Louisa, the widow of Captain George H. Fortson of Seattle; Sophie Sarah, the wife of Daniel Waldo Bass; George Arthur, who died in 1892; Roberta Gertrude, the wife of Paul H. Watt and mother of children; and Elizabeth Helen, the wife of Virgil Newton Bogue.

After a brief illness caused by pneumonia, George Frye died at his home in Seattle on May 2, 1912, at the age of 79. He left a will that was admitted to probate on May 8, 1912. Frye divided part of his fortune between his children and left the rest to his widow.

== See also ==
- Great Plains
- Butler Hotel
- Arthur A. Denny
- Charles Bebb

== Literature cited ==
- "Studio portrait of George Frederick Frye, Seattle, circa 1910", University of Washington Libraries, Seattle: Museum of History & Industry, OCLC 51876357
- Blethen, Alden J., ed. (April 9, 1905), "George Frye will erect this building at Sixth and Pike", Seattle Daily Times, Seattle: The Seattle Times Company, p. 8, ISSN 2639-4898, LCCN sn86072007, OCLC 1765328
- Blethen, Alden J., ed. (June 23, 1906), "George Frye to build", Seattle Daily Times, Seattle: The Seattle Times Company, p. 4, ISSN 2639-4898, LCCN sn86072007, OCLC 1765328
- Blethen, Alden J., ed. (May 23, 1911), "David Graham married fifty years ago today", Seattle Daily Times, Seattle: The Seattle Times Company, p. 8, ISSN 2639-4898, LCCN sn86072007, OCLC 1765328
- "Seattle pioneer claimed by death", Spokane Chronicle, Spokane: Cowles Company, p. 25, May 3, 1912, LCCN sn86072020, OCLC 14374699
- Blethen, Alden J., ed. (May 5, 1912), "George Frederick Frye", Seattle Daily Times, Seattle: The Seattle Times Company, p. 6, ISSN 2639-4898, LCCN sn86072007, OCLC 1765328
- Blethen, Alden J., ed. (May 8, 1912), "Will of George Frye admitted to probate", Seattle Daily Times, Seattle: The Seattle Times Company, p. 16, ISSN 2639-4898, LCCN sn86072007, OCLC 1765328
- Bagley, Clarence B. (1916), History of Seattle: From the Earliest Settlement to the Present Time, Chicago: S. J. Clarke Publishing Company, LCCN 16011408, OCLC 7372062
- Hanford, Cornelius (1924), Seattle and Environs 1852-1924, vol. 1, Chicago: Pioneer Historical Publishing Company, OCLC 3494902
- Pollard, Lancaster (1937), Spencer, Lloyd (ed.), A History of the State of Washington, vol. IV, New York: American Historical Society, pp. 472–473, LCCN 38011577, OCLC 877187
- Terrible, Sue (January 1, 2016), "George F. Frye Papers, 1873-1910", Archives West, Eugene: Orbis Cascade Alliance
