= Leisure centre =

Site intended for leisure activities

A leisure centre, sports centre, or recreation centre is a purpose-built building or site, usually owned and provided by the local government authority, where people can engage in a variety of sports and exercise, and keep fit.

== Typical facilities ==
Facilities typically include a swimming pool, a large sports hall, and a gym, and may include: aerobics studios, an indoor cycling studio, squash courts, a cafeteria, a licensed bar, outdoor grass and/or artificial pitches for football (soccer), hockey etc., a solarium, sauna and/or steam room. Some of its functions may overlap with that of a community centre.

Leisure centres are staffed by attendants who carry out a range of tasks to help and supervise the people using the leisure centre's facilities, and act as swimming pool lifeguards, gym instructors and coaches, offering advice, motivation, and expertise to users. Leisure centres are often operated by private companies on contract to the local authority.

Some leisure centres, particularly in Australia, are called aquatic centres, if their main facilities are pools for swimming, diving, and other aquatic sports.

== Leisure centres in England and Wales ==
Leisure centres are often operated by private companies or not-for-profit organisations operating under contract to the local authority, for example Kirklees Active Leisure is a charitable trust, and Greenwich Leisure Limited is a social enterprise. Examples of leisure centres in England and Wales include:

Current

- Deeside Leisure Centre
- Gateshead Leisure Centre
- Leisure centres in Cardiff
- K2 Leisure Centre in Crawley
- Kensington Leisure Centre
- South Norwood Leisure Centre
- Splashpoint Leisure Centre in Worthing
- Swansea Leisure Centre in Wales
- The Dome Leisure Centre in Doncaster
- Brentford Leisure Centre in Chiswick
- Medway Park Sports Centre in Gillingham, Kent

Former

- Gloucester Leisure Centre
- Ladywell Leisure Centre in Lewisham, London
- Black Lion Leisure Centre in Gillingham, Kent, now Medway Park Sports Centre

== See also ==
- Department of Parks and Recreation (disambiguation)
- Health club
- Sports club
