= B. F. Day Elementary School =

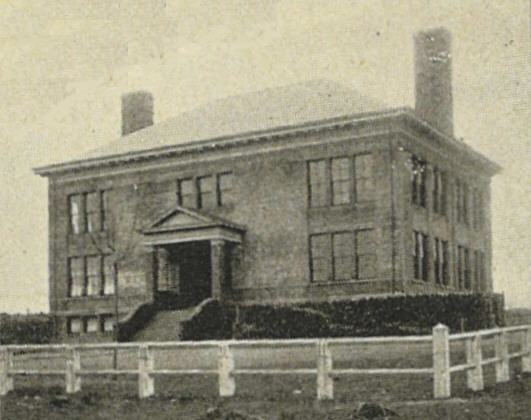
- B.F. Day School in 1900

Location
- 3121 Linden Avenue N Seattle, Washington 98103; United States; 47°39′18″N 122°20′57″W

Information
- Type: Public
- Motto: The Family School
- School district: Seattle Public Schools
- NCES School ID: 530771001157
- Principal: Kristen Eckert
- Teaching staff: 29.10 (on an FTE basis)
- Grades: PreK–5
- Enrollment: 406 (2021-2022)
- Student to teacher ratio: 13.95
- Colors: Maroon and yellow
- Mascot: Sunny the Sun Dragon
- Website: dayes.seattleschools.org

Seattle Landmark
- Designated: April 13, 1981

B.F. Day Elementary School (Often called B.F. Day for short.) is an elementary school located in the Fremont neighborhood of Seattle, Washington, United States, and is part of the Seattle Public Schools school district.

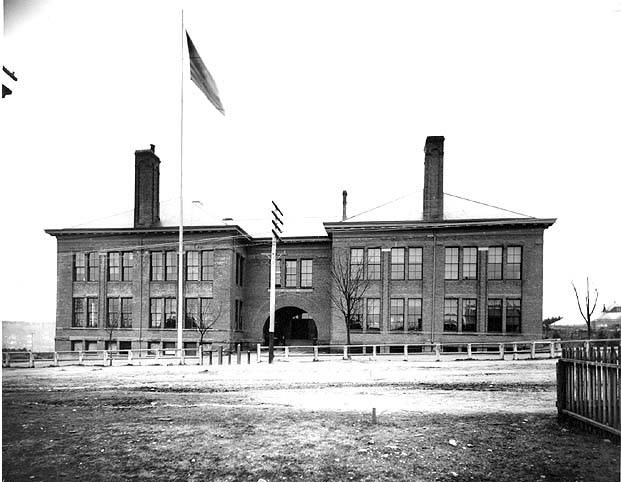
B F Day School between N. 39th St., Fremont Ave. n., N. 40th St., and Linden Ave. N. in a 1902 photograph by Asahel Curtis

== Origin and Development ==
Originally, B.F. Day was just two classes. The Fremont School Board opened a school in March, 1889. It was originally two classes held in a house on 36th Avenue N and Whitman Street. Ownership of the original house is attributed to Mrs. Gale or the Steele family. Use of the house ended shortly after, in June 1889.

The next year a store in 36th Avenue N and Aurora Avenue N rented out enough space for three classrooms. A man living in Fremont, Benjamin Franklin Day, paid for the first three months of the schools rent. Use of the store ended on May 2nd, 1891.

In June, 1891 Fremont was incorporated into Seattle, meaning the city had to accommodate for the students within Fremont and Edgewater. To accommodate for the amount of students, the Seattle School District rented the Good Templars Hall, on 35th Avenue and Albion Place, as a temporary school location. Use of the Good Templars Hall went from September, 1891 to May, 1892.

In 1891, Benjamin Franklin Day wanted to end the frequent moving of the school grounds, so he and his wife, Francis R. Day, donated a large plot of land to the Seattle School District, on the condition that they turned it into a $25,000 school. The Seattle School District agreed and hired John Parkinson, an architect, to design the school. The school board named the school "Day School", to honor Benjamin Franklin Day and Francis R. Day. The school was later named B.F. Day to clarify that "Day" signified Benjamin Franklin Day's name, and not when classes took place.

In the schools first year, 185 students from grades 1st-6th attended. By 1899, the school exceeded it's capacity. To prevent overcrowding, 1st graders attended school downstairs at 3803 Aurora Avenue. 6th graders were taught at an old grocery store. To prevent sending students to other buildings, James Stephen, an architect, used plans made by John Parkinson, and designed an eight-room addition to the north side of the school. This addition cause the main entrances to be moved to the east side and the west side.

By 1914-15, the school reached its capacity of 800 students. To prevent the second case of overcrowding, four classroom north and south wings were added to the school, along with an assembly room. In addition, The Seattle Parks Department bought a playfield north of the school, and the Seattle School District bought a playfield to the south.

In 1986, when the school was about 99-years-old, the Seattle School District opted to renovate the school, instead of tearing it down. During the renovation, which went from 1989-1991, the students attended school at John Hay Elementary School. The renovation cost $5 million, and included converting the gym into a daycare, and building a new gym and resource center. The playground was also renovated.

Around November, 2021 and the Summer of 2022, the playground was renovated again to improve the equipment and make it more accessible to students with disabilities.

== Present Day ==
B.F. Day describes itself as "The family school", aiming to build community and teach students with core values of being caring, engaged, and responsible.

== School Song ==
Oh, what do they say about

B.F. Day?

They say it’s the family school

Where sharing and caring

And lending a hand

We all form a family

Across the land

Oh, what do they say about

B.F. Day?

Come visit and you will see

All our smiles go for miles

You’re a friend to the end

At B.F. Day!
