= Susana Machado Bernard House and Barn =

Historic house in California, United States

- U.S. National Register of Historic Places
- Los Angeles Historic-Cultural Monument
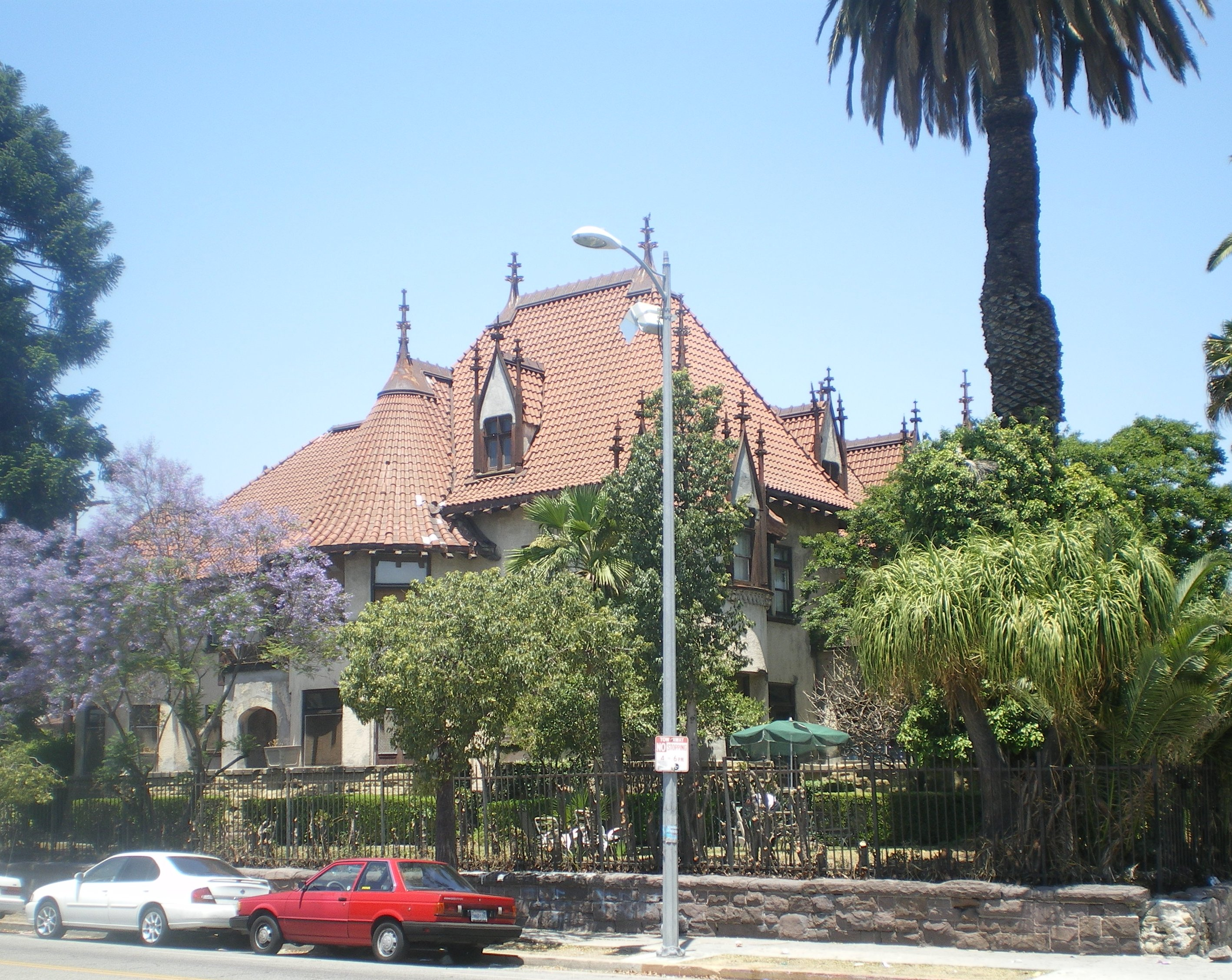
- Susana Machado Bernard House and Barn, 2008

- Location within the Los Angeles metropolitan area Location within California Location within the United States
- Location: 845 S. Lake St., Los Angeles, California
- Coordinates: 34°3′15″N 118°16′44″W
- Built: 1901
- Architect: Parkinson, John
- Architectural style: Gothic Revival-Art Nouveau
- NRHP reference No.: 79000482
- LAHCM No.: 208

Significant dates
- Added to NRHP: September 4, 1979
- Designated LAHCM: 1979-01-17

Susana Machado Bernard House and Barn is an elaborate 10,000-square-foot (930 m^{2}) Art Nouveau Gothic Revival style mansion and carriage house located in the Pico Union section of Los Angeles, California. Built in 1901, the house was designed by architect John B. Parkinson (1861–1935). Parkinson also designed the Los Angeles Memorial Coliseum, Union Station and Los Angeles City Hall. Noted for its Gothic style with soaring spaces, the house has vaulted ceilings and curved walls. In 1979, it was designated a Los Angeles Historic-Cultural Monument (HCM #208), and listed on the National Register of Historic Places. The property was purchased in 1996 by the Center for Human Rights & Constitutional Law. Since 2002, the house has been operated as the Casa Libre/Freedom House, a fourteen-bed shelter for homeless minors. In May 2003, the Los Angeles Times profiled the shelter, noting the following: "Casa Libre/Freedom House occupies a newly renovated mansion near MacArthur Park. Registered as a state, county and federal historic site, the home's gothic facade rises elegantly from the corner of South Lake Street and James M. Wood Boulevard. The shelter arranges for schooling, counseling, and medical care for undocumented and unaccompanied immigrant children, mainly from Latin America.

== See also ==
- National Register of Historic Places listings in Los Angeles
- List of Los Angeles Historic-Cultural Monuments in the Wilshire and Westlake areas
