= Gloucester Leisure Centre =

Former public leisure centre

Coordinates: 51.862°N 2.239°W

Gloucester Leisure Centre was a leisure centre located at Station Road in Gloucester, England. A new leisure centre (branded GL1) was built nearby as a replacement.

The original centre was also used as a concert venue hosting artists such as Thin Lizzy, Duran Duran, The Police and Oasis (band).
