= Hubert-Thom McAn Building =

Building in Los Angeles, California

- U.S. Historic district – Contributing property
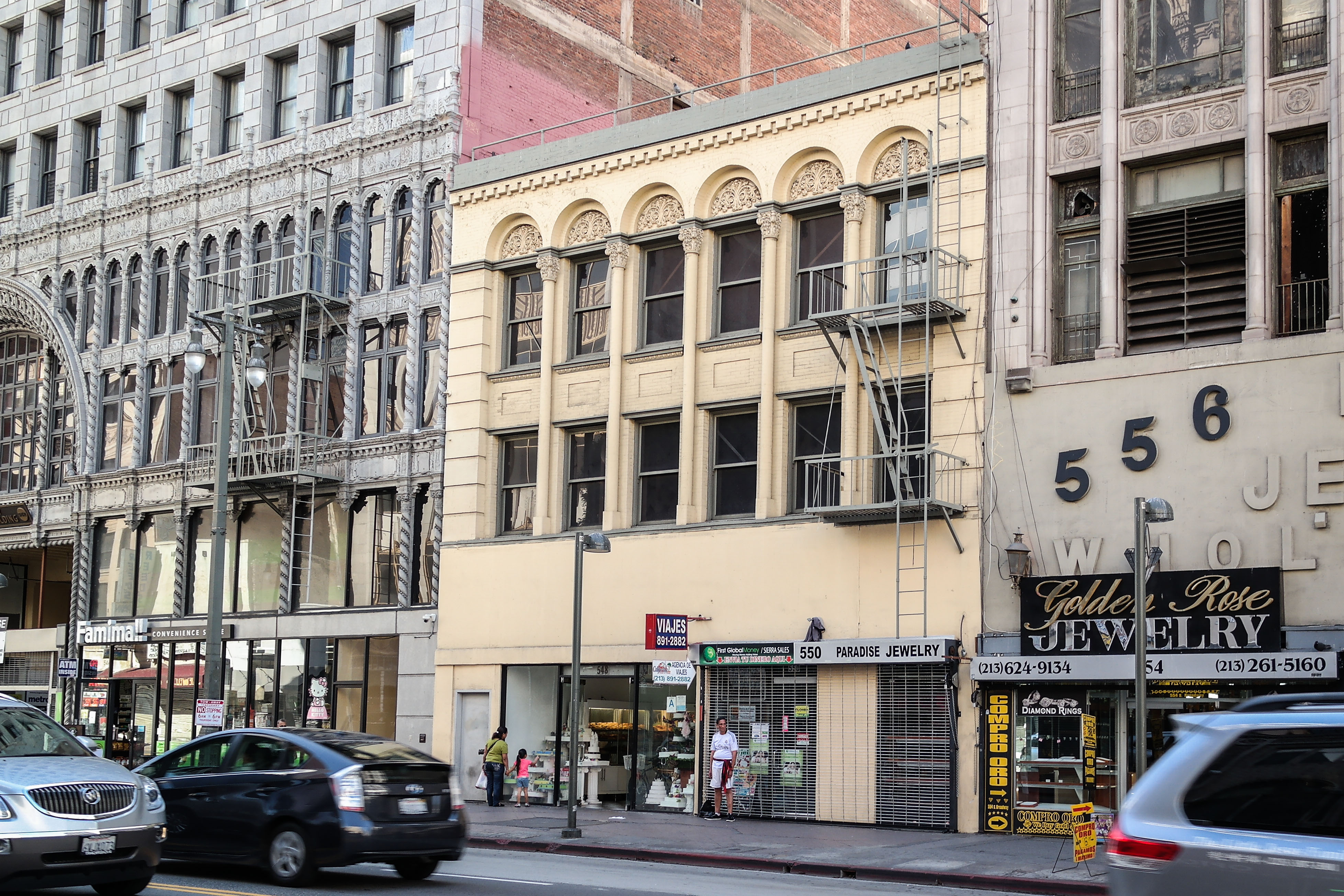
- The building in 2014

- Location within the Los Angeles metropolitan area
- Location: 546 S. Broadway, Los Angeles, California
- Coordinates: 34°02′49″N 118°15′07″W
- Built: 1900
- Architect: John B. Parkinson
- Architectural style: Italianate
- Part of: Broadway Theater and Commercial District (ID79000484)
- Designated CP: May 9, 1979

Hubert-Thom McAn Building, also known as Eden Hotel, is a historic three-story building located at 546 S. Broadway in the Broadway Theater District in the historic core of downtown Los Angeles.

== History ==
Hubert-Thom McAn Building was designed by John B. Parkinson and built in 1900. The building formerly housed a hotel, then offices and a shoe store.

In 1979, the Broadway Theater and Commercial District was added to the National Register of Historic Places, with Hubert-Thom McAn Building listed as a contributing property in the district.

== Architecture and design ==
Hubert-Thom McAn Building is made of brick with concrete footings and a pressed-brick facade, and features an Italianate design that includes decorative arched windows. The building originally featured a parapet, but it has since been removed.

== See also ==
- List of contributing properties in the Broadway Theater and Commercial District
