= John Parkinson (architect) =

English-American architect

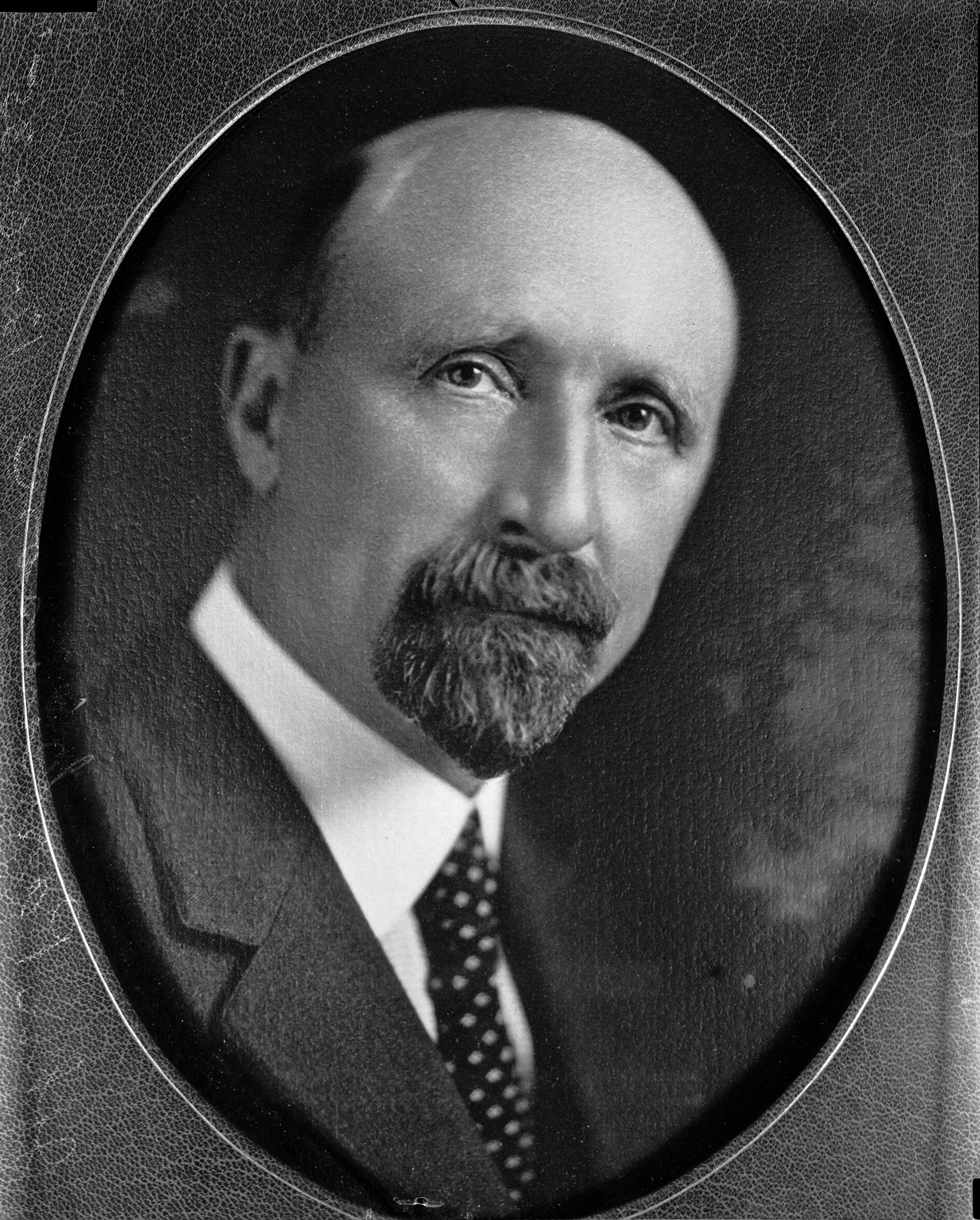
- John B. Parkinson
- Born: December 12, 1861; Scorton, Lancashire, England
- Died: December 9, 1935 (aged 73); Santa Monica, California, United States
- Education: Bolton's Mechanics Institute, diploma in Engineering and Architecture, 1882
- Occupation: Architect
- Spouse(s): Meta B. Breckenfeld (1889-1922), Florence I. Gumaer (1923-1935)
- Children: 2
- Parent(s): Thomas and Mary Ann Bibby Parkinson
- Buildings: Los Angeles City Hall; Los Angeles Memorial Coliseum; Los Angeles Union Station more than 25 historic district contributing properties

John Parkinson was an English architect who lived in Los Angeles, where he designed many of the city's most iconic buildings, more than thirty of which are listed in the National Register of Historic Places (NRHP).

As a solo practitioner, Parkinson was responsible for the NRHP-listed Susana Machado Bernard House and Barn, Engine House No. 18, four contributing properties in the Broadway Theater and Commercial District, and three contributing properties in the Spring Street Financial District. In a ten-year partnership with George Edwin Bergstrom, the two were responsible for six Broadway Theater and Commercial District and seven Spring Street Financial District contributing properties, and in a fifteen-year partner with his son Donald Parkinson, the two were responsible for the Los Angeles Memorial Coliseum, Los Angeles Union Station, Southern California Gas Company Complex, Bullocks Wilshire, and three Broadway Theater and Commercial District, five Spring Street Financial District, and two Hollywood Boulevard Commercial and Entertainment District contributing properties. Parkinson also co-designed Los Angeles City Hall with John C. Austin and Albert C. Martin Sr., and outside Los Angeles, Parkinson designed the NRHP-listed Assay Office in Seattle, Seattle National Bank Building, Caliente Railroad Depot, National Bank of Whittier Building, and Ogden Union Station.

== Early life ==
John Parkinson (12 December 1861 - 9 December 1935) was born in Scorton in Lancashire, England to Thomas, a cotton mill engine boiler stoker, and Mary Ann Bibby Parkinson. John had one sister, Margaret; John's maternal grandmother and paternal uncle also lived with the family. John was named after his paternal grandfather.

Beginning at age 16, John apprenticed to Jonas J. Bradshaw, where he learned craftsmanship and practical construction. He also studied architectural drafting and engineering Bolton's Mechanics Institute, where he earned a diploma in Engineering and Architecture in 1882.

== Career ==
John immigrated to North America in 1883, first to Winnipeg, Manitoba where he built fences, and then to Minneapolis, Minnesota where he learned stair building. He moved to Napa, California in 1885, where he worked as a stair-builder and also took on architectural commissions, including an annex to the original Bank of Napa building.

=== Seattle, Washington ===
Considering Napa a dead town, Parkinson traveled to Seattle in February 1889, where he opened his first architectural practice after failing to secure a position as a draftsman. He partnered Cecil Evers the following month, and the partnership ended a little more than a year later. Parkinson left Napa permanently in September 1889.

Parkinson's early projects in the Puget Sound include Olympia Hotel in Olympia, Calkins Hotel on Mercer Island, and several residences. Parkinson also secured several business blocks after the Great Seattle Fire of 6 June 1889, including Butler Block and the Seattle National Bank Building.

In 1891, Parkinson won a design competition for B.F. Day School, located in Seattle's Fremont neighborhood. Thereafter, the Seattle School Board appointed Parkinson as the Seattle Schools Architect and Superintendent. Parkinson was responsible for all Seattle Schools projects over the next several years, and he also designed the first buildings at what would become Seattle Pacific University and Seattle University.

Parkinson frequently published renderings of his buildings in the professional architectural press. He also was an early member of the Washington State Chapter of the American Institute of Architects.

Parkinson invested in real estate and he was both architect and developer of the Seattle Athletic Club Building. His investments were hit hard by the Panic of 1893; the panic also resulted curtailed construction in the area. Additionally, the Seattle School Board terminated Parkinson's school position in 1894. Parkinson entered several competitions during these years, but failed to win any commissions.

=== Los Angeles, California ===
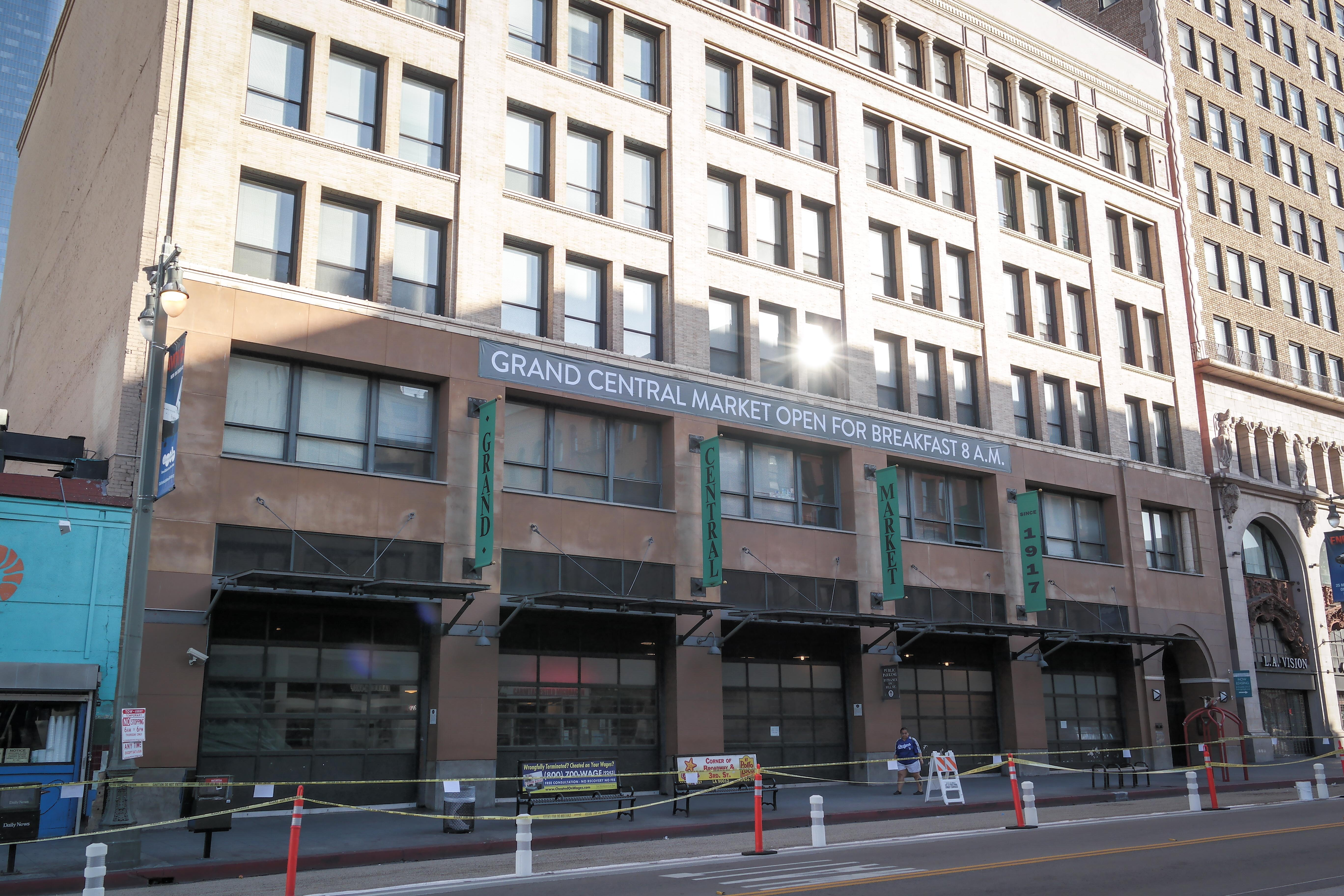
Homer Laughlin Building in 2014

John Parkinson moved to Los Angeles in 1894 and opened his architecture office on Spring Street between Second and Third. By 1896, Parkinson had designed the Homer Laughlin Building, Los Angeles's first Class "A" fireproof steel-frame structure; construction on the building was completed two years later. Subsequently, Parkinson found significant success in the city; within next ten years he designed Susana Machado Bernard House and Barn, Engine House No. 18, four buildings that are contributing properties in the Broadway Theater and Commercial District, and three buildings that are contributing properties in the Spring Street Financial District. Parksinson's Braly Block in the Spring Street Financial District was the first skyscraper in Los Angeles and was the tallest structure in the city until the completion of Los Angeles City Hall, also designed by Parkinson in association with John C. Austin and Albert C. Martin Sr., in 1928.

==== Parkinson & Bergstrom ====
Parkinson partnered with George Bergstrom from 1905 to 1915. This partnership resulted in numerous significant works, including six contributing properties in the Broadway Theater and Commercial District and seven contributing properties in the Spring Street Financial District. Bergstrom eventually left the partnership to establish his own practice.

==== Parkinson & Parkinson ====
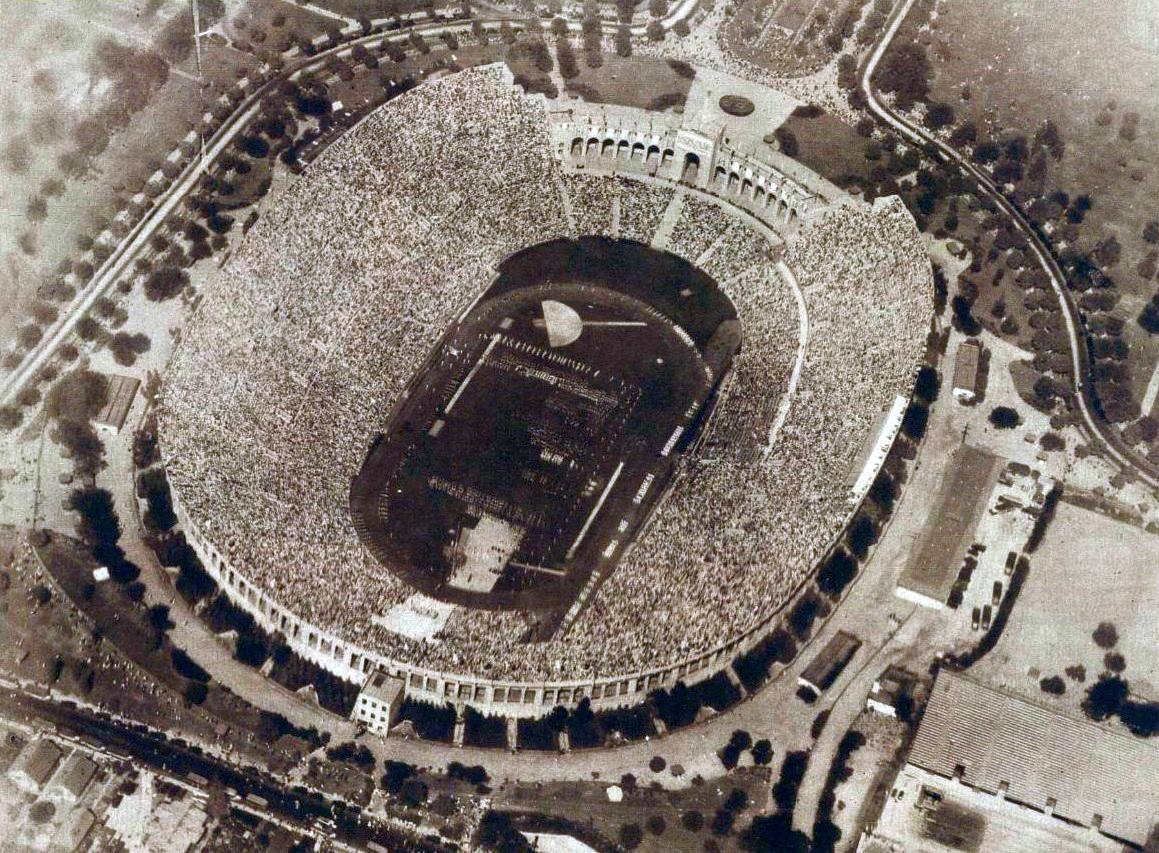
Los Angeles Memorial Coliseum in 1932

Parkinson partnered with his son Donald, in 1920. This partnership also resulted in several significant works, including Los Angeles Memorial Coliseum, Bullocks Wilshire, Union Station, and historic district contributing properties, including three in the Broadway Theater and Commercial District, five in the Spring Street Financial District, and two in the Hollywood Boulevard Commercial and Entertainment District.

John Parkinson also completed an early renovation of Pershing Square while partnered with his son, and he and his son participated in the architecture event at the 1932 Summer Olympics.

== Personal life and death ==
John was naturalized either in Seattle, Washington, in March 1889 or on June 9, 1892. He was married twice, the first to Meta B. Breckenfeld (b. 1862-d. 1922) on December 25, 1889. John and Meta had a daughter, Mary, and son, Donald, together; Meta's mother and sister also lived with them. John's second marriage was to Florence I. Gumaer (b. 1884-d. 1966) on April 6, 1923. Florence's mother and two servants also lived with them. John and Florence traveled frequently, including to Honolulu, Hawaii, on their honeymoon and to Europe in 1930, 1933, 1934 and 1935. John died in his Santa Monica, California home on December 9, 1935.

Donald B. Parkinson
- Born: August 10, 1895; United States
- Died: November 17, 1945 (aged 50); United States
- Occupation: Architect
- Parent(s): John and Meta Parkinson
- Buildings: Los Angeles Memorial Coliseum; Los Angeles Union Station

John's son Donald was also an architect and the two partnered from 1920 to John's death. As a solo architect, Donald was responsible for several notable works, including: the Pomona–Downtown station (1940) in Pomona, California, Hollywood Branch Library (1940) in Los Angeles, California, Courtlandt Gross House in Tehachapi, California in 1942, and the General Motors Corporation Chevrolet Assembly Factory (1947).

== Parkinson firm evolution ==
- 1888–1889 John Parkinson (Napa, California and Seattle, Washington)
- 1889–1890 John Parkinson and Cecil Evers (Seattle)
- 1890–1894 John Parkinson (Seattle)
- 1894–1895 Burton and Parkinson (Los Angeles, California)
- 1895–1905 John Parkinson (Los Angeles)
- 1905–1915 John Parkinson and G. Edwin Bergstrom (Los Angeles)
- 1915–1920 John Parkinson (Los Angeles)
- 1920–1945 John Parkinson and Donald B. Parkinson (Los Angeles)
- 1945–1955 Parkinson, Powelson, Briney, Bernard & Woodford (Los Angeles)
- 1955–1984 Woodford & Bernard (Los Angeles)
- 1984–1990 Woodford, Parkinson, Wynn & Partners (Los Angeles and San Diego, California)
- 1990–1992 DWL Parkinson (Los Angeles and San Diego)
- 1992–2008 Parkinson Field Associates (Los Angeles and Austin, Texas)

== Selected works ==
John Parkinson's works include (in Los Angeles unless otherwise noted):

=== Parksinson and Evers ===
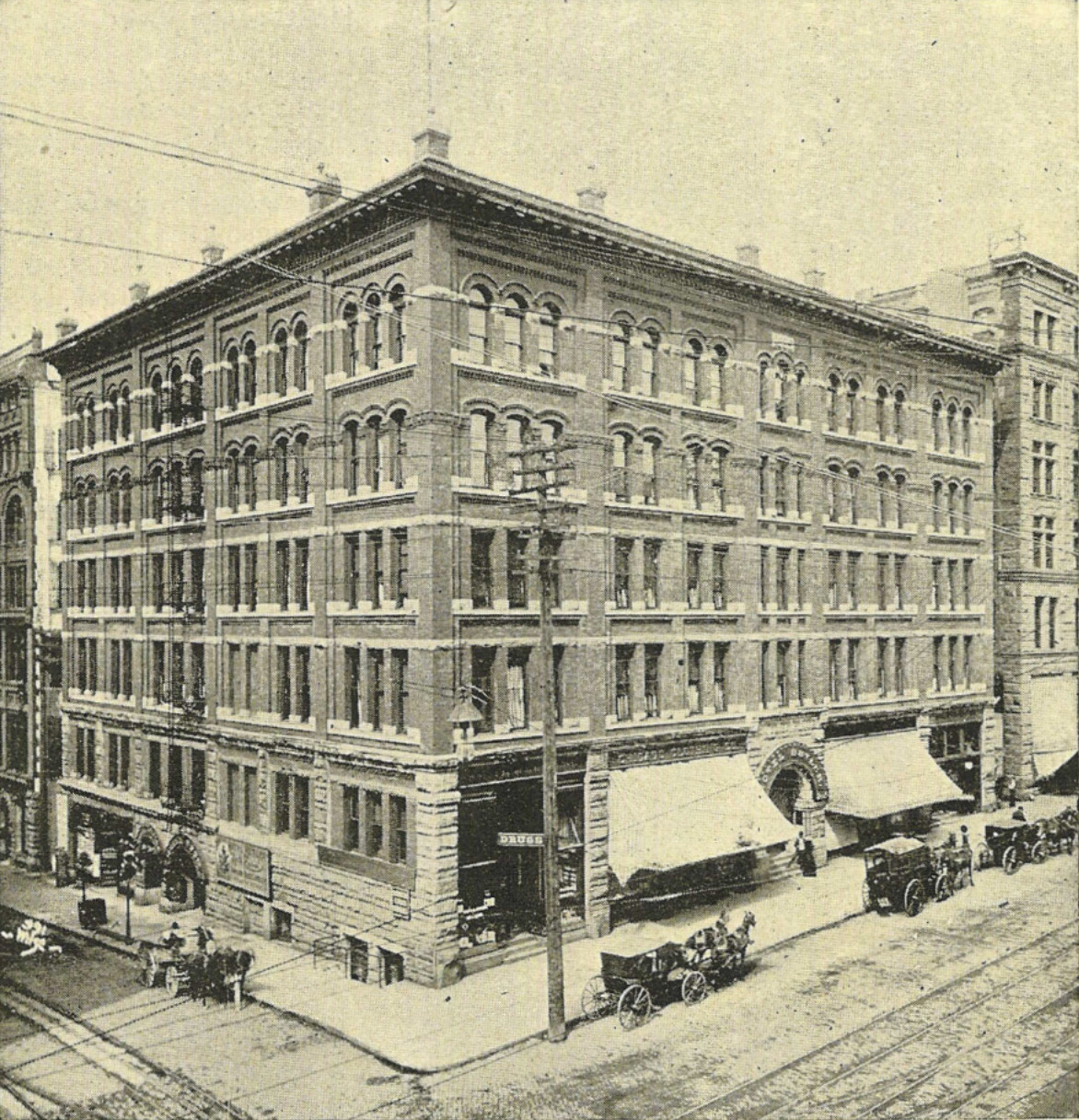
Butler Hotel in 1900

- Olympia Hotel (1889), Olympia, Washington
- Calkins Hotel (1889), Mercer Island, Washington
- Butler Hotel (1889), Seattle, Washington

=== John Parkinson ===
==== Seattle, Washington ====
Seattle Athletic Club Building in 1905

- Seattle National Bank Building (1890-1891)
- B. F. Day Elementary School (1891)
- Seattle Athletic Club Building (pre-1893)
- Assay Office (1893)

==== Los Angeles, California ====
===== Broadway Theater and Commercial District =====
- Homer Laughlin Building (1896-1898)
- Jacoby Brothers Building (1899-1900), non-contributing
- Hubert-Thom McAn Building (1900)
- O. T. Johnson Building (1902), formerly contributing
- Nelson Building (1902 addition), formerly contributing
- Reeves Building (1903), non-contributing

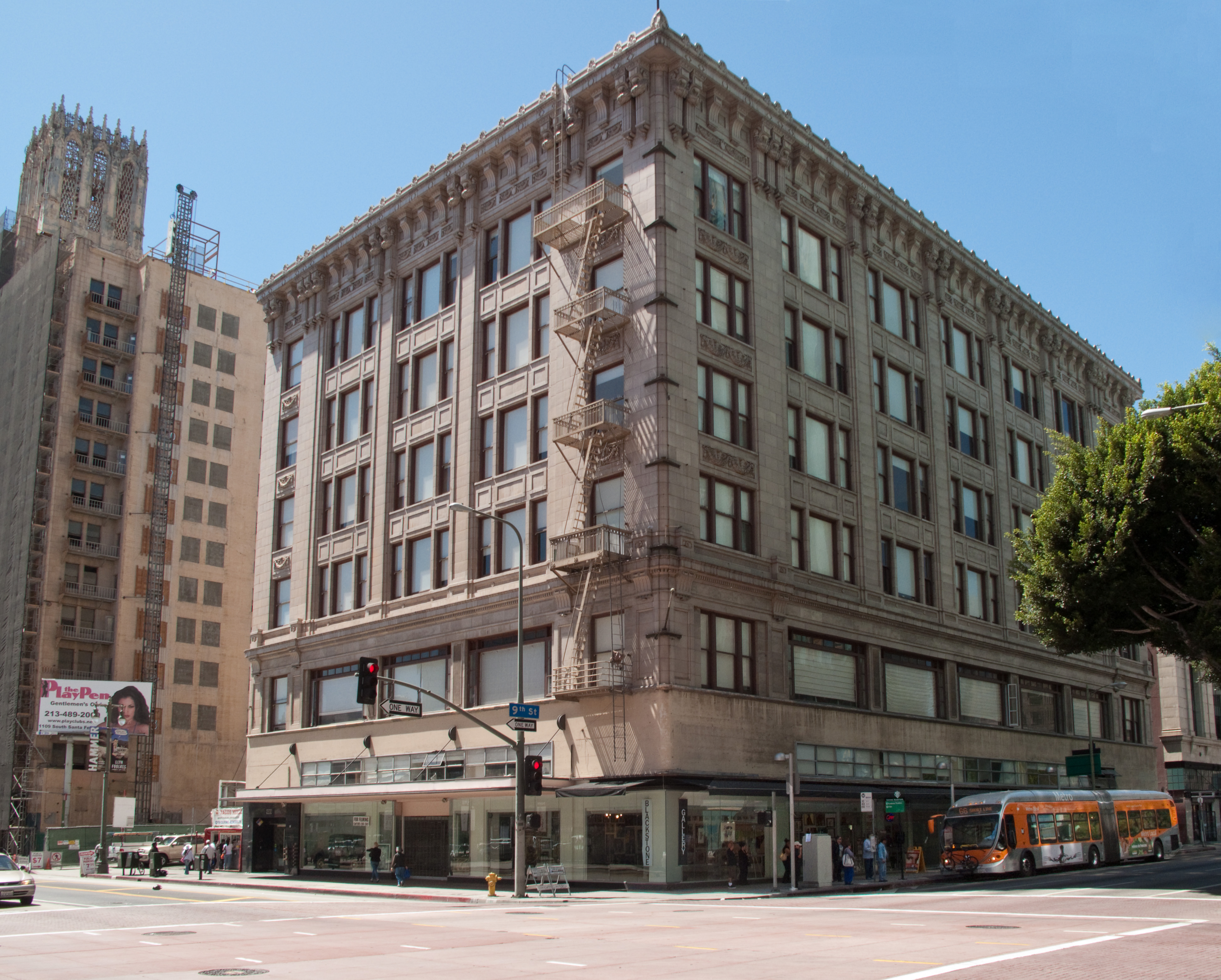
Blackstone's Department Store Building in 2013

- Blackstone's Department Store Building (1917)
- Gennet Building (1922), with Hubbard

===== Spring Street Financial District =====
- Continental Building (1903)
- Hotel Alexandria (1906)
- President Trading Company (1916)

===== Elsewhere =====
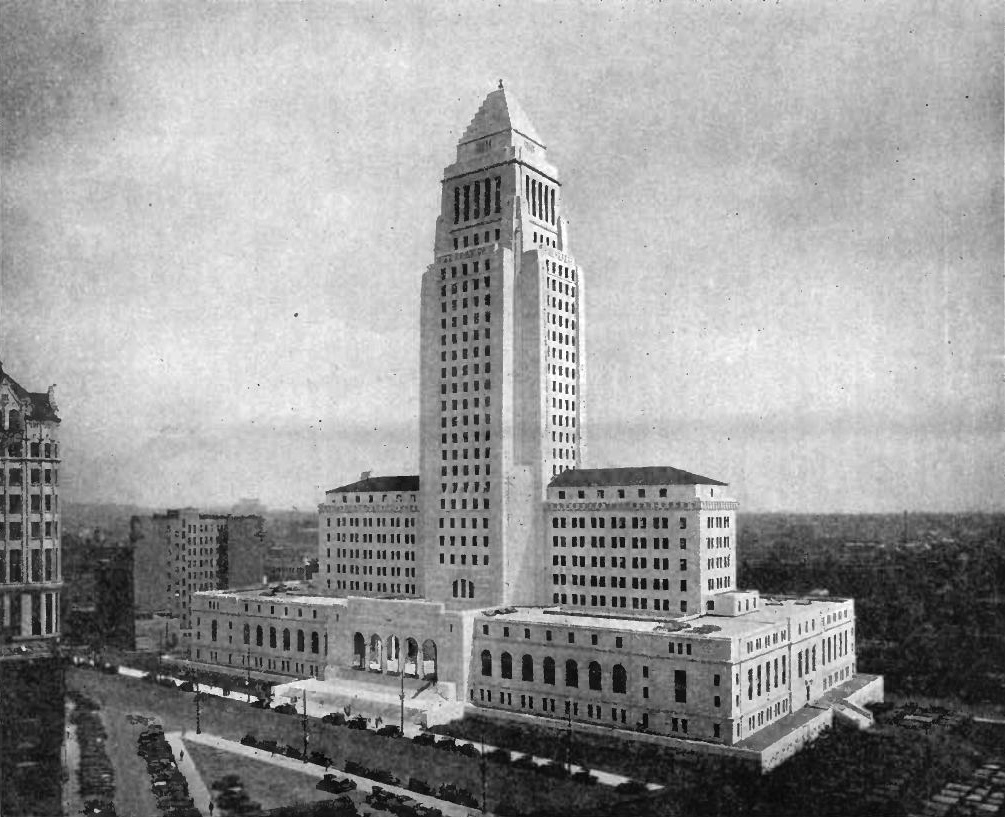
Los Angeles City Hall in 1931

- Burdick Block (1900 addition)
- Susana Machado Bernard House and Barn (1901)
- Engine House No. 18 (1904)
- Joannes Brothers Company building (1917)
- Southern Pacific Railroad terminal (1923)
- Los Angeles City Hall (1928), with Albert C. Martin Sr.

=== Parkinson and Bergstrom ===
==== Broadway Theater and Commercial District ====
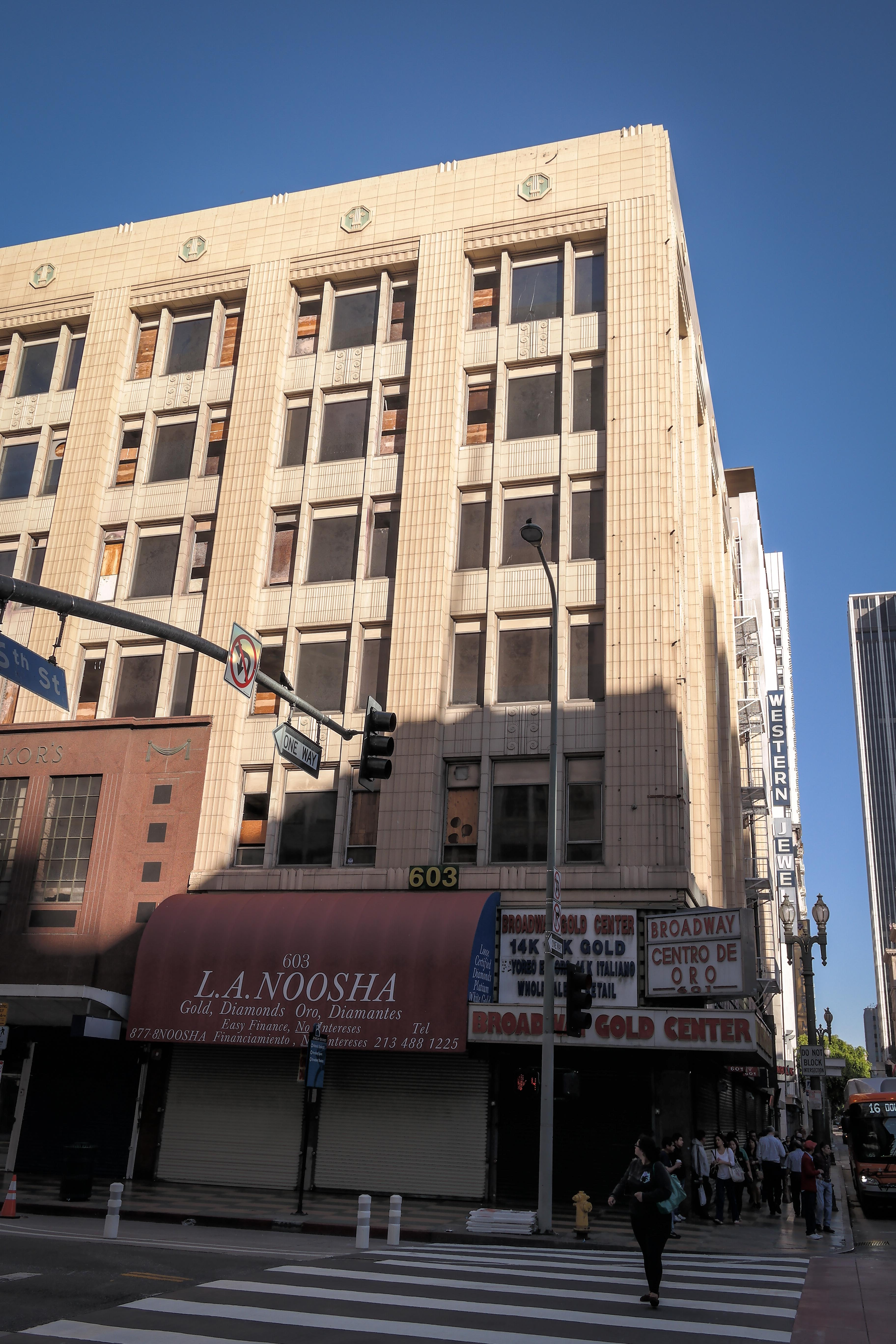
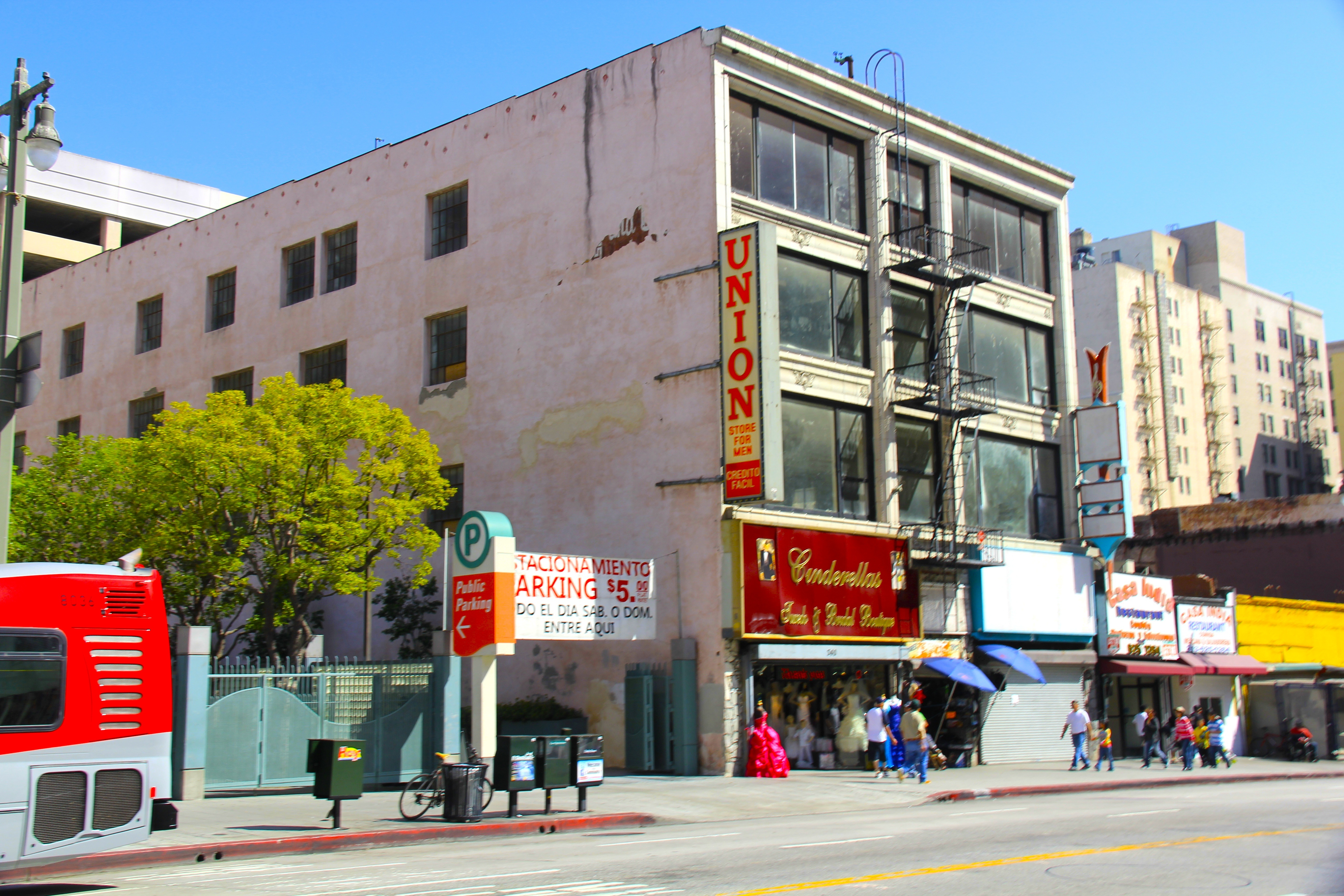
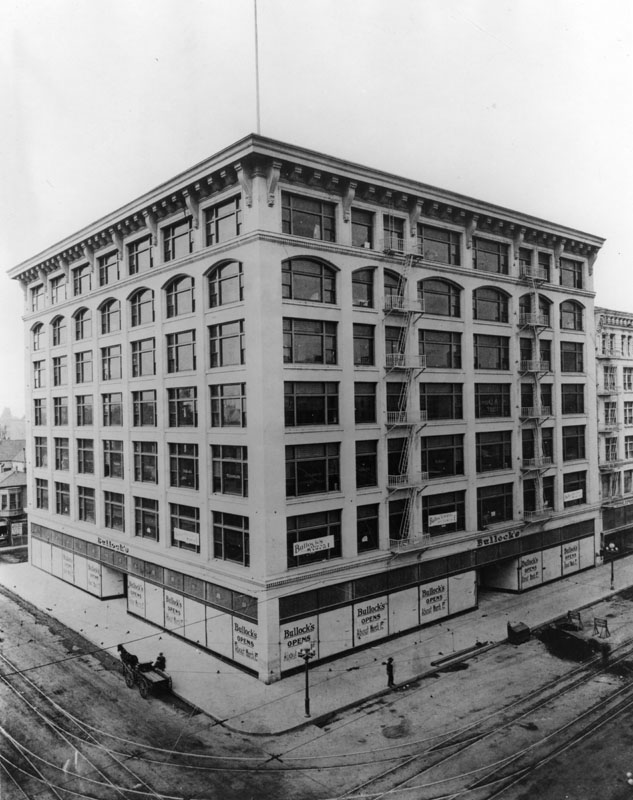
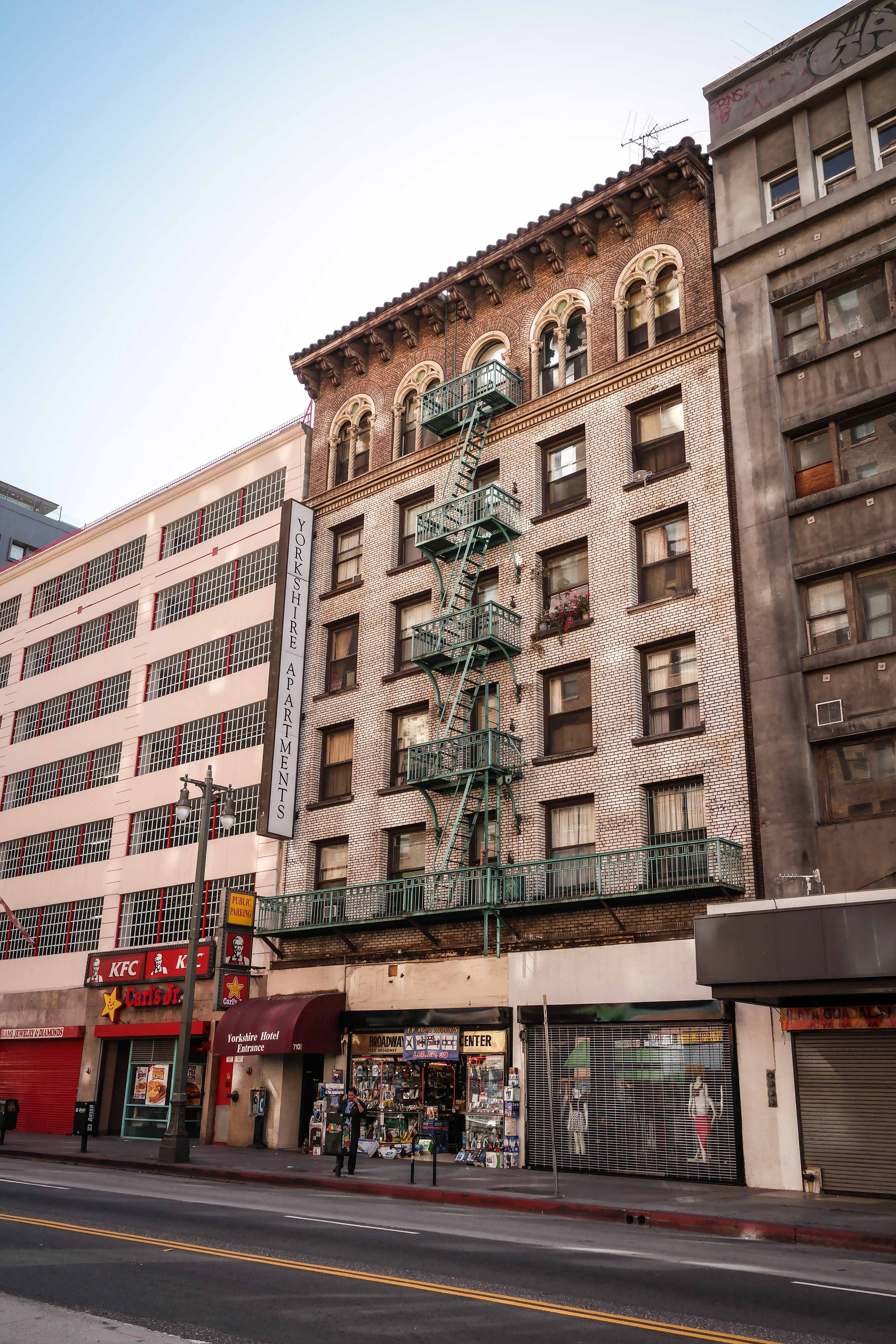
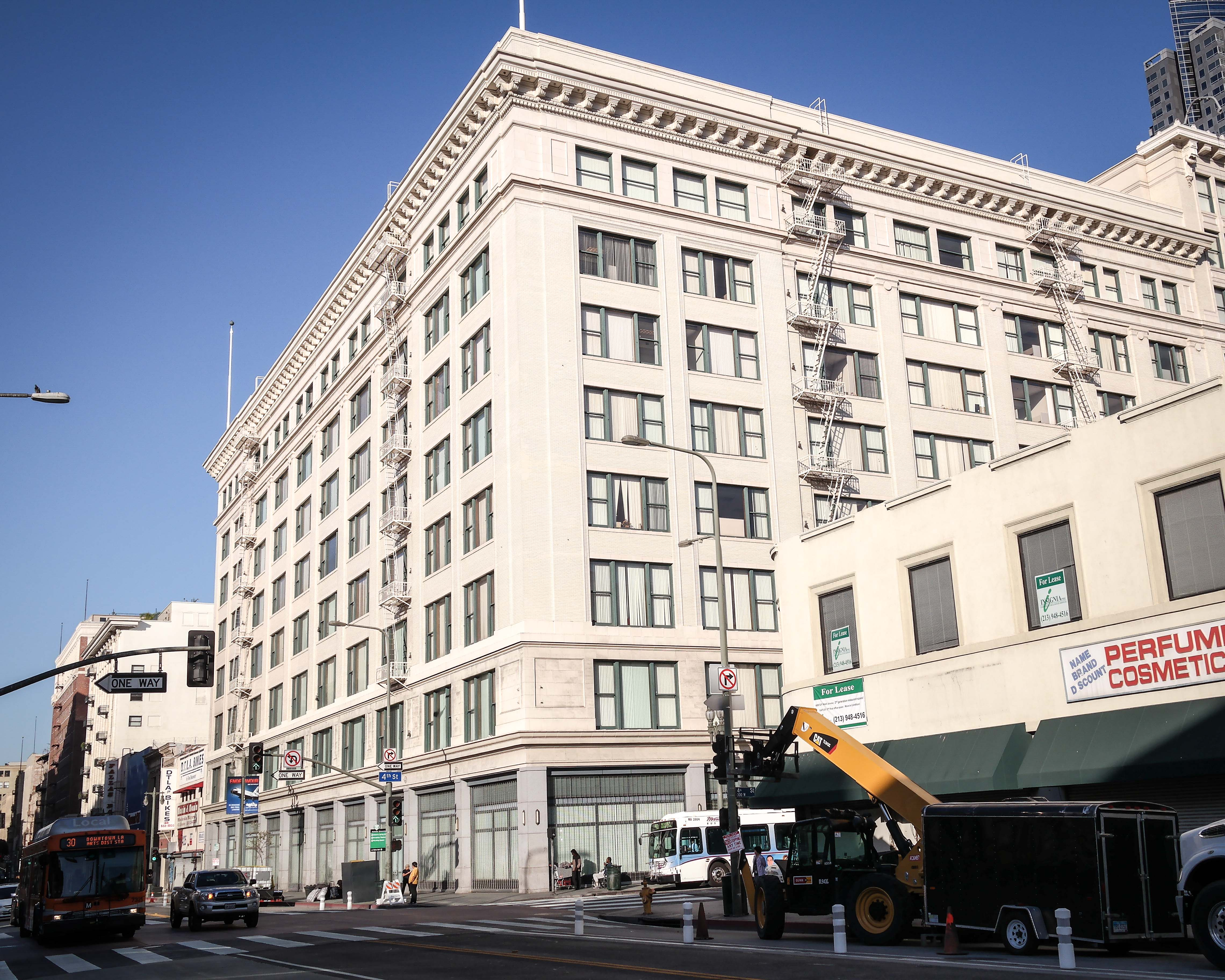
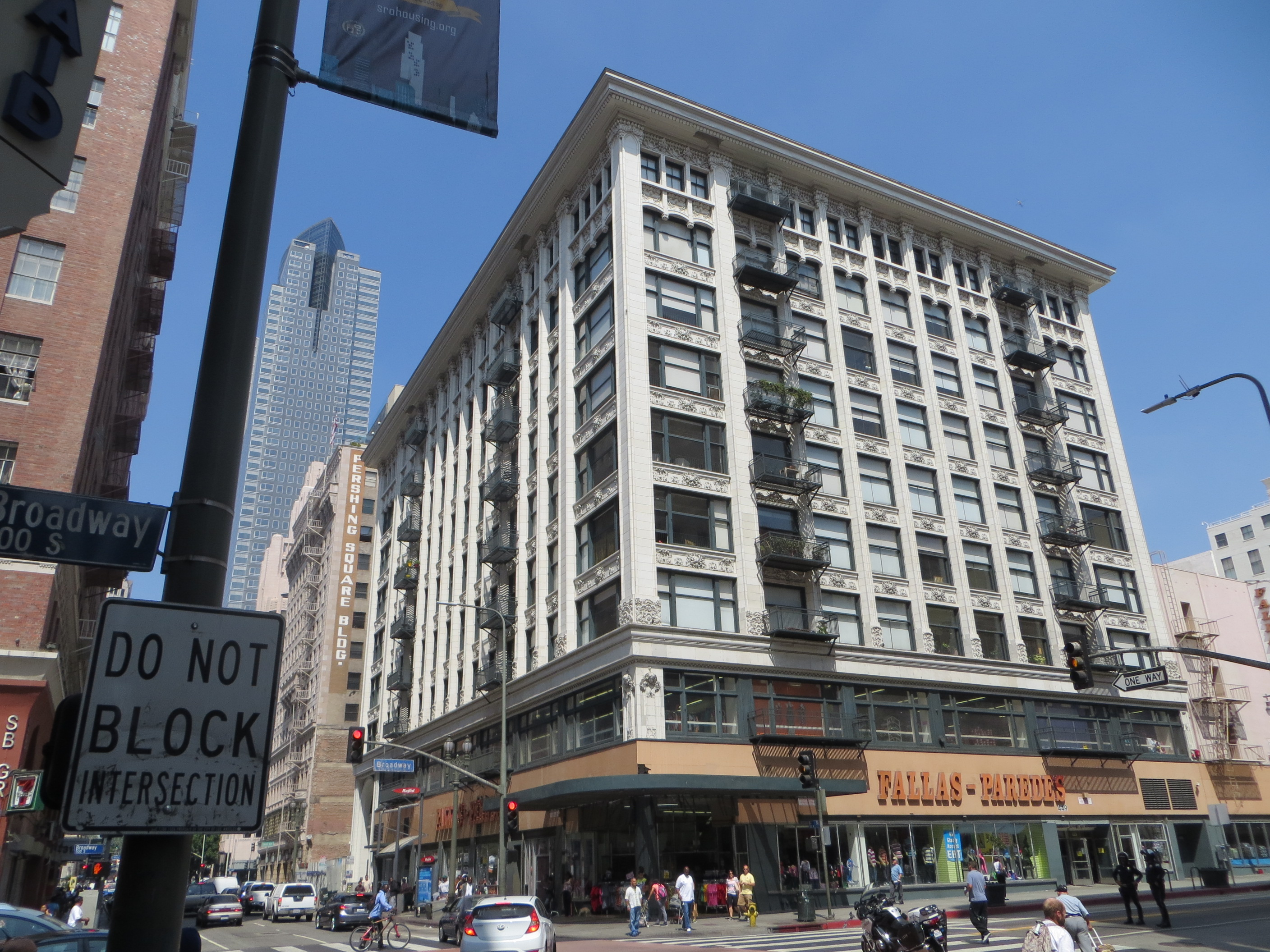
Contributing properties in the Broadway Theater and Commercial District (clockwise from upper-left): Norton Building, Trustee Building, Yorkshire Hotel, Metropolitan Building Broadway Mart Center, Bullock's Building
- Trustee Building (1905)
- Norton Building (1906)
- Bullock's Building (1906-1907)
- Yorkshire Hotel (1909)
- Broadway Department Store (1913)
- Metropolitan Building (1913)

==== Spring Street Financial District ====
- Security Building (1906)
- Pacific Southwest Bank (1910)
- A.G. Bartlett Building (c. 1911)
- Rowan Building (1910)
- Hotel Alexandria Annex (1911)
- Washington Building (1912), not in NRHP-boundaries
- Stationers Annex (1913)
- Crocker Bank (1914)

=== Parkinson and Parkinson ===
==== Broadway Theater and Commercial District ====
- Hart '24 (1924)
- Hart '28 (1928)
- Mackey Building (1934)

==== Spring Street Financial District ====
- Hotel Hayward Annex (1925)
- Title Insurance Building (1928)
- Banks & Huntley Building (1930)
- E. F. Hutton Building (1931)
- Los Angeles Stock Exchange Building (1931), with Samuel Lunden

==== Hollywood Boulevard Commercial and Entertainment District ====
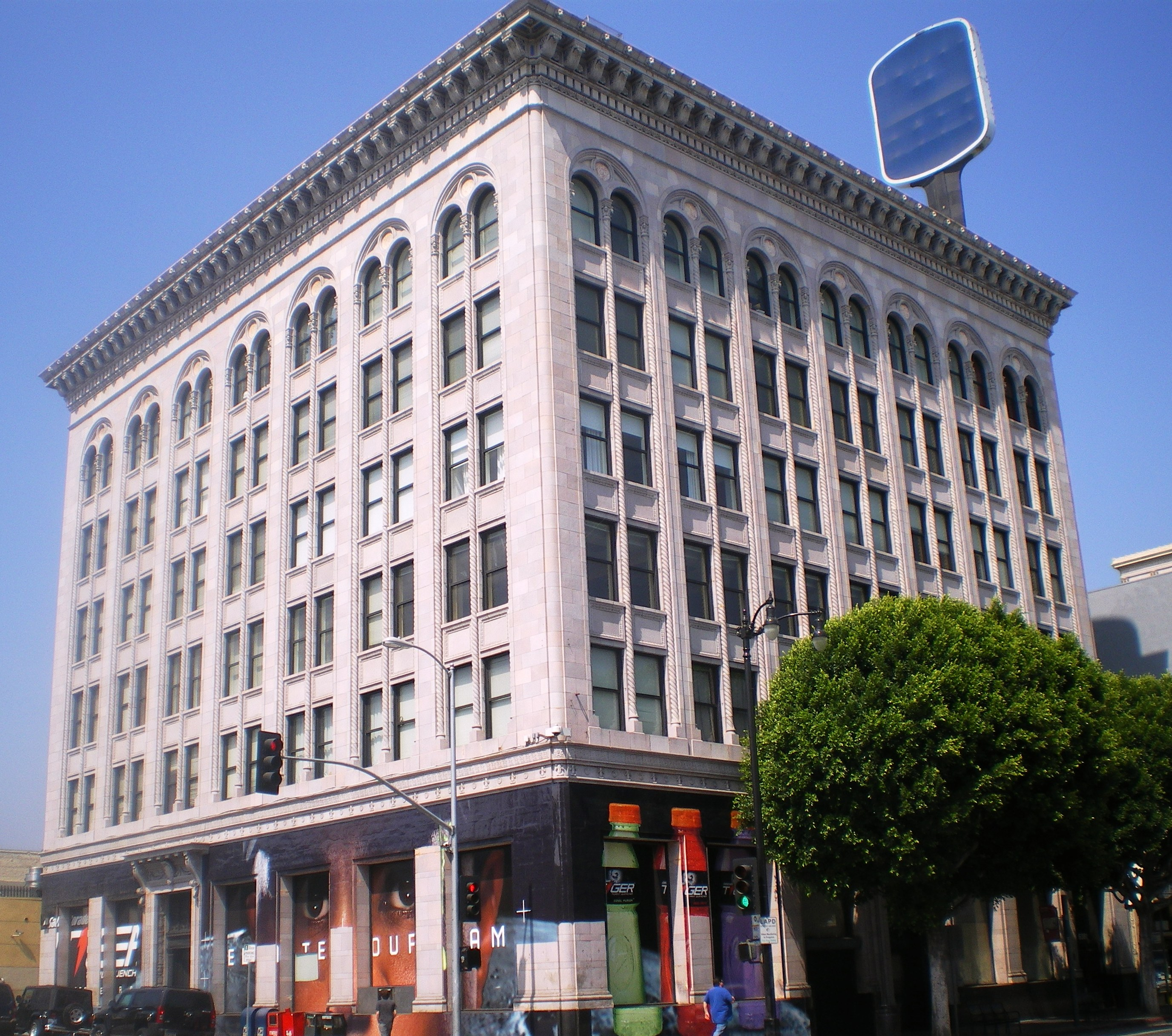
Security Trust and Savings in 2008

- Security Trust and Savings (1921)
- Security Trust (1928)

==== Elsewhere in Los Angeles ====
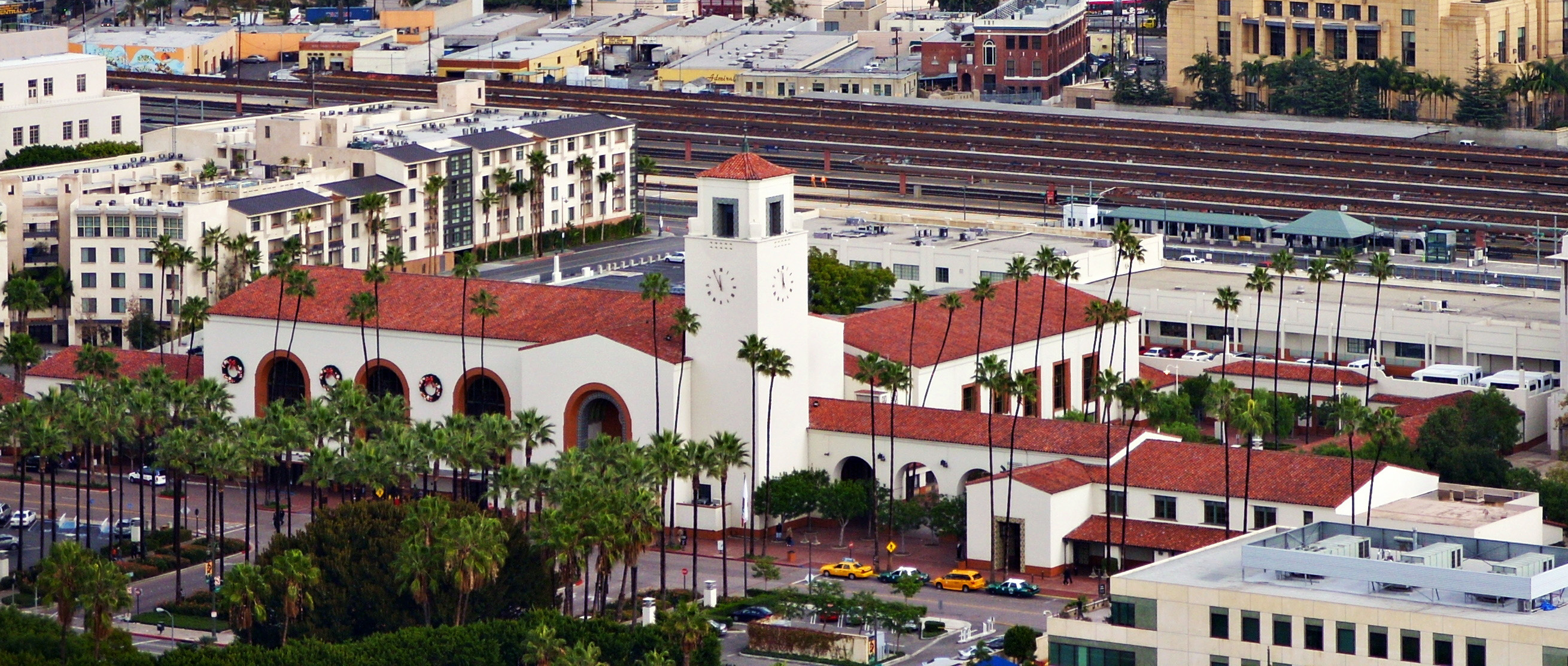
Los Angeles Union Station in 2008

- Federal Reserve Bank of San Francisco (1920)
- Los Angeles Memorial Coliseum (1923)
- Southern California Gas Company Complex (1925)
- Security Trust and Savings branch at Western Ave and Beverly Blvd (1925)
- Zumberge Hall of Science, University of Southern California (1928)
- Desmond's Westwood (1929)
- Bullock's Wilshire (1929)
- Title Guarantee and Trust Company Building (1930)
- California Bank Building (1930)
- Bullock's Westwood (1932)
- Los Angeles Union Station (1939)

==== Elsewhere ====
- Caliente Railroad Depot (1923), Caliente, Nevada
- National Bank of Whittier Building (1923), Whittier, California
- Union Station (1924), Ogden, Utah
- Sterling Plaza (1929), Beverly Hills, California
- 9600 Wilshire Boulevard (1938), Beverly Hills, California (with Paul R. Williams)
