= German House (Seattle) =

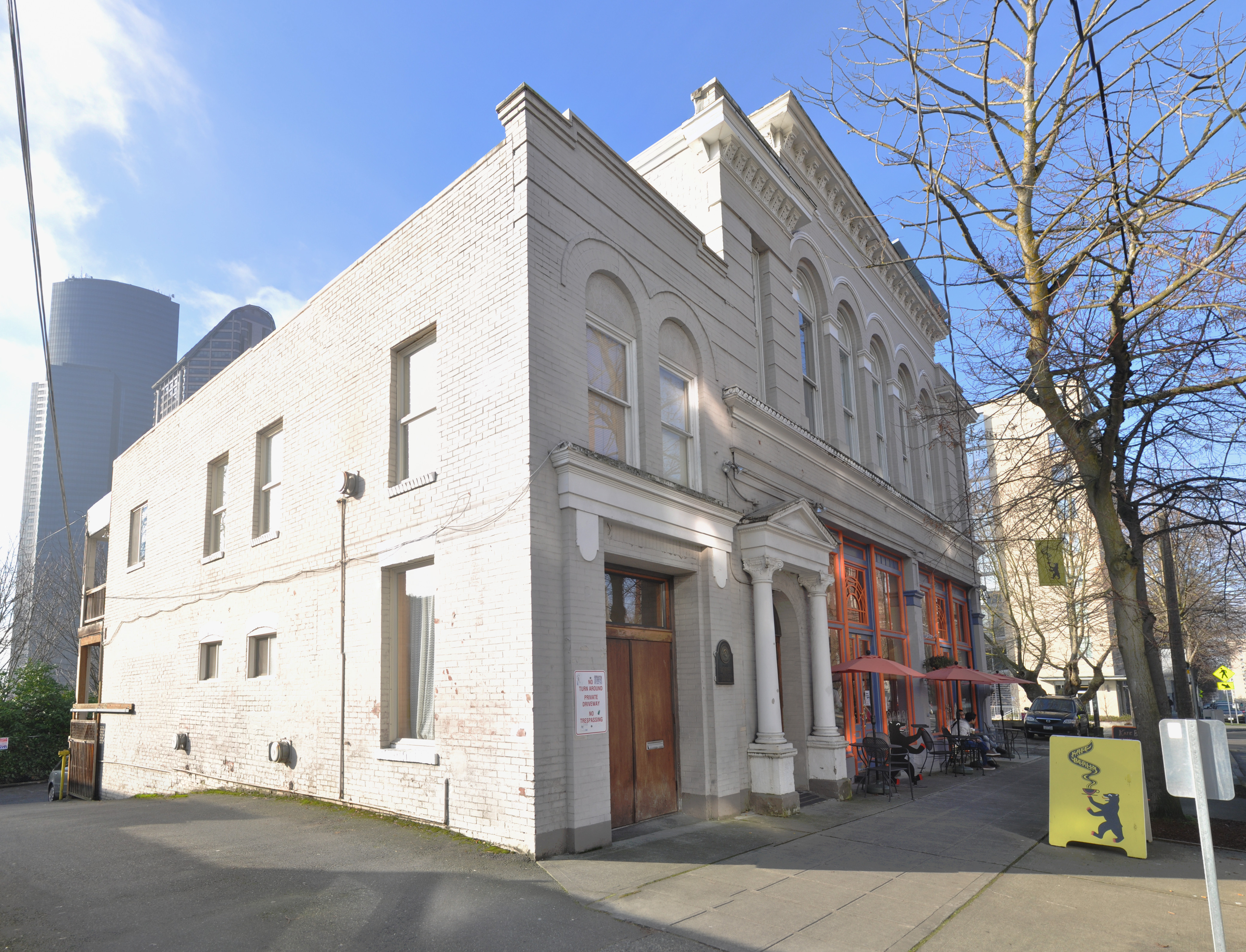
- German House in 2013 (featuring the recently opened Kafe Berlin)
- Former names: Assay Office
- Alternative names: German Club

General information
- Location: 613 9th Ave; Seattle, Washington, U.S.
- Completed: 1893

Seattle Landmark
- Designated: July 6, 1983
- Assay Office
- U.S. National Register of Historic Places
- Location within Downtown Seattle
- Coordinates: 47°36′22″N 122°19′25″W
- Built: 1893
- Architect: John B. Parkinson
- Architectural style: Romanesque Revival, Beaux Arts
- NRHP reference No.: 72001271
- Added to NRHP: March 16, 1972

The German House also known as the Assay Office and Prosch Hall is a building in the First Hill area of Seattle, Washington, which since its construction in 1893 (Often incorrectly cited as 1886) has variously functioned as an office block, an entertainment hall and, until 1932, the city's assay office through which most of the gold brought to Seattle from the Yukon gold rush was processed into bricks. Following World War II the building returned to the possession of its previous German-American owners; it continues today to be a popular venue for German-themed events in Seattle. It was designated a Seattle Landmark in 1983. It was listed on the National Register of Historic Places as Assay Office in 1972.

== History ==
The structure's history dates back to 1893 when local newspaper publisher, civic leader and historian Thomas W. Prosch commissioned architect John B. Parkinson to design a two story and basement brick building on the lot just north of his home at 611 9th Avenue. The building would contain two store rooms on the ground floor and a public meeting space above which would be known as Prosch Hall.

In anticipation of the gold that would soon start flowing into Seattle from the Yukon gold fields, the federal government began a search for a secure detached building outside of the central business district with capacity for the assay office and minting facilities where they could mold nuggets and flakes into gold bullion to ship to the mint at San Francisco. In June 1898 Prosch eagerly leased his entire building to the United States mint for use as the regional assay office. Fred A. Wing was appointed to open and run the facility. Members of the Westminster Presbyterian Church who still held an unexpired lease on the upstairs hall took exception to this deal and barricaded themselves inside the building, hurling legal threats at Prosch and the workers trying to access the building. With the government's deal resting on a firm opening date, Prosch was quick to meet the church's demands to get them off the property. The stand-off only lasted a day and remodeling was able to proceed in time for the July 15 opening date. By the following year it was taking in more gold than any other assay office in the United States. Later additions to the original building included a vault room added on the south side of the building in 1900, doubled in size in 1906, that was later built up into the short 2 story annex seen today.

By the late 1920s gold deposits had declined markedly and, in 1932, the building ceased to be used as an assay office. In 1935 after a movement led by mortician E. E. Middlestadt to unify the city's German groups under one roof, the building was taken over by Deutsches Haus (German Club), an organization for Seattleites of German descent, becoming their social center. Local architect Theobald Buchinger, a native of Vienna, Austria, was commissioned to redecorate the interior to suit their needs; the vaults that once held gold would now be used to store German beer. The various German societies would share use of the building with the Steuben Society, the Swiss Society and the Swiss Male Chorus, among others. It was used as a Navy entertainment center during World War II before returning to the possession of its previous German owners. Today, its affairs are administered by the German Heritage Society in Seattle; it plays host to a diverse array of Germanic activities including traditional concerts and balls. Lectures on the building's historic roots have also taken place here.

On July 6, 1983, the city of Seattle's Landmark Preservation Board designated German House as a Seattle Landmark. It had previously been added to the National Register of Historic Places in March 1972.

In November 2011 a German-themed café named "Kafé Berlin" opened on the first floor of the building; however, by 2016 it had closed permanently.
