= Title Guarantee and Trust Company Building =

Historic building in Los Angeles

- U.S. National Register of Historic Places
- Los Angeles Historic-Cultural Monument
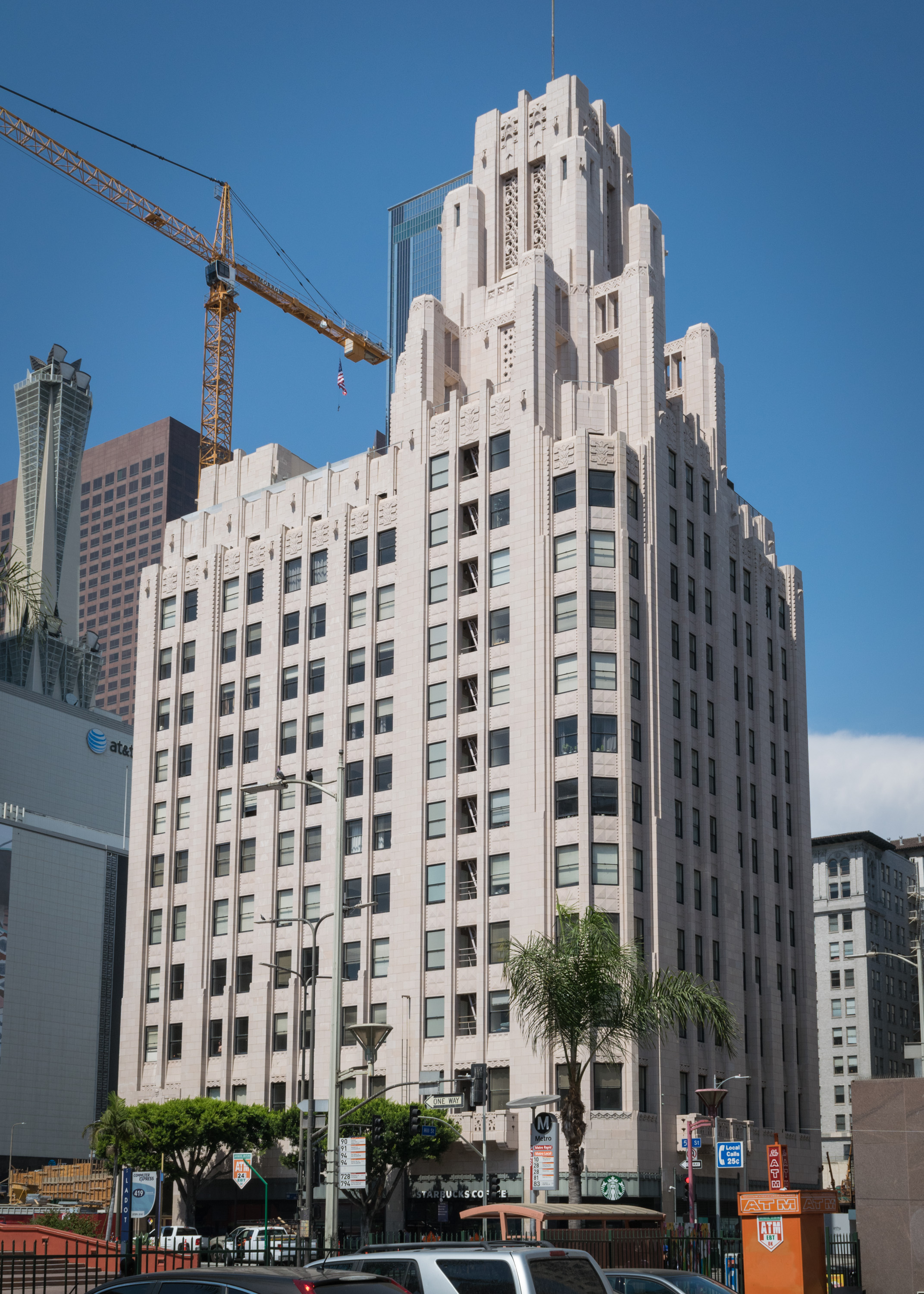
- Title Guarantee and Trust Company Building, 2017

- Location within the Los Angeles metropolitan area Location within California Location within the United States
- Location: 401-411 W. 5th St., Los Angeles, California
- Coordinates: 34°2′56″N 118°15′3″W
- Built: 1930
- Architects: Parkinson & Parkinson; Multiple
- Architectural style: Art Deco
- NRHP reference No.: 84000891
- LAHCM No.: 278
- Added to NRHP: July 26, 1984

The Title Guarantee and Trust Company Building is an Art Deco style highrise building on Pershing Square in Downtown Los Angeles. It was built in 1930 on the site of the California Club building. The building was designed by The Parkinsons, who also designed many Los Angeles landmarks, including Los Angeles City Hall and Bullocks Wilshire. Originally an office building, the structure was later converted into lofts. In 1984 the building was listed in the National Register of Historic Places.

== In popular culture ==
Location shots of the building were featured in the CBS television drama series Lou Grant (1977–82), in which it was represented as the home of the Los Angeles Tribune, the fictional newspaper around which the series was based. Vampire P.I. Mick St. John purportedly lived and maintained his office on the top floor of the building in CBS' Vampire P.I. Drama, Moonlight (2007-2008).

== See also ==
- List of Registered Historic Places in Los Angeles
