= ROW DTLA =

Commercial district in Downtown Los Angeles

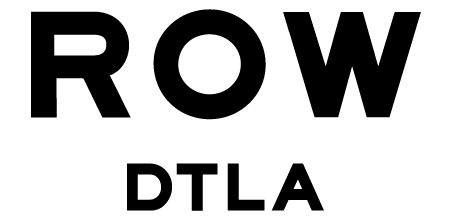
- Interactive map of ROW DTLA
- Location: Downtown Los Angeles
- Address: 777 S. Alameda Street
- Coordinates: 34.03457415021514°N 118.240837623552°W
- Opening: 2017; 9 years ago
- Website: rowdtla.com

Companies
- Architect: RIOS

Technical details
- Size: 30 acres (12 ha)
- Leasable area: 1,300,000 square feet (120,000 m^{2})

Row DTLA (stylized as ROW DTLA, formerly known as Alameda Square) is a commercial district located in Downtown Los Angeles, which is situated at the intersection of Fashion District, Skid Row, and the Arts District. It spans over 30 acres and was repurposed from the historic Alameda Square complex. The mixed-use development comprises 100 retail stores, restaurants, and 1.3 million square feet (120,000 m^{2}) of commercial workspace.

The 7th Street Produce Market, which is an open-air wholesale produce market that was established in 1917, occupies a 5-acre (2.0 ha) area within ROW DTLA. The marketplace is converted into Smorgasburg – a food market – every Sunday.

== History ==
Los Angeles Terminal Market, a national hub for produce growers, was designed by LA architect John Parkinson, a prominent LA architect and constructed between 1917 and 1923. It was strategically located at the terminus of the Southern Pacific Railroad, connecting the city's port with its downtown by rail.

At one point, the majority of the region's produce business was conducted there. The sprawling campus eventually became known as Alameda Square and was one of the most ambitious private developments of early-20th century Los Angeles.

Between the 1920s and the 1980s, the complex housed two of Los Angeles' largest wholesale produce markets, Seventh Street and Ninth Street markets. In 1986, market operations were consolidated under the Los Angeles Wholesale Produce Market.

Until the late 2010s, the site served as the headquarters and manufacturing base of American Apparel.

Since 2021, SHEIN has headquartered its American operations at the site.

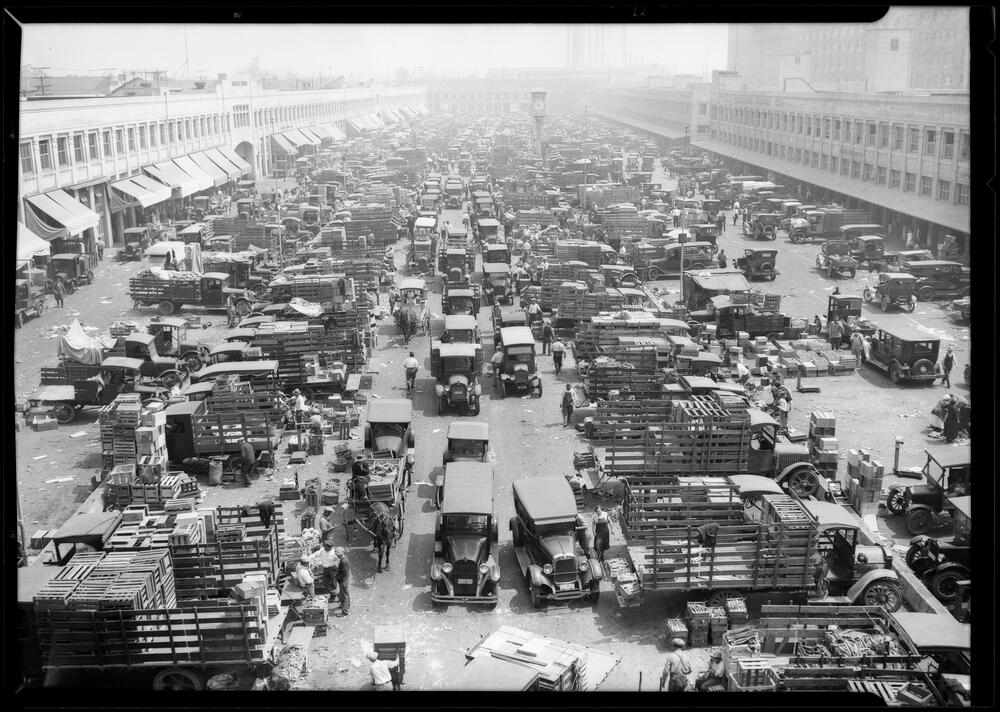
Terminal Market, now the Smorgasburg, 1926

== See also ==
- Downtown Los Angeles, California
