= Houston Parks and Recreation Department =

Department of City of Houston, Texas

Department overview
- Preceding agencies: Department of Parks; The Department of Playgrounds and Recreation
- Jurisdiction: City of Houston
- Headquarters: Houston
- Employees: 708 (as of Jan 2021)
- Department executive: Kenneth Allen, Director
- Child agencies: · The Director's Office; · Recreation & Wellness; · Greenspace Management; · Facilities Management & Development; · Management & Finance; · Urban Park Rangers & Safety; · Communications
- Website: houstontx.gov/parks/index.html

The Houston Parks and Recreation Department (HPARD) operates and maintains the City of Houston's parks, playgrounds, swimming pools, golf courses, skateparks, and recreation centers; as well as, providing recreational programming. HPARD currently oversees 382 developed parks and more than 167 greenspaces, covering over 39,500 acres; and over 125 miles of hike-and-bike trails.

The HPARD consists of seven (7) divisions:

1. The Director's Office
2. Recreation and Wellness Division
3. Greenspace Management
4. Facilities Management and Development
5. Management and Finance
6. Urban Park Rangers and Safety, and
7. Communications

== History ==
The Department of Public Parks was created on March 15, 1916 by a City of Houston ordinance (Chapter 23, Article 1, Section 32-2). At that time, the department had two parks — Sam Houston Park and Hermann Park.

In 2008, the department received national accreditation from the National Recreation and Park Association's (NRPA) Commission for Accreditation of Park and Recreation Agencies (CAPRA).

As of 2021, the department has:

- Budget: $69 million
- Employees: 708 full time
- Facilities
  - Developed Parks: 382
  - Greenspaces: 160
  - Acres: 39,000+
