= Butler Hotel =

Coordinates: 47°36′9″N 122°19′59″W

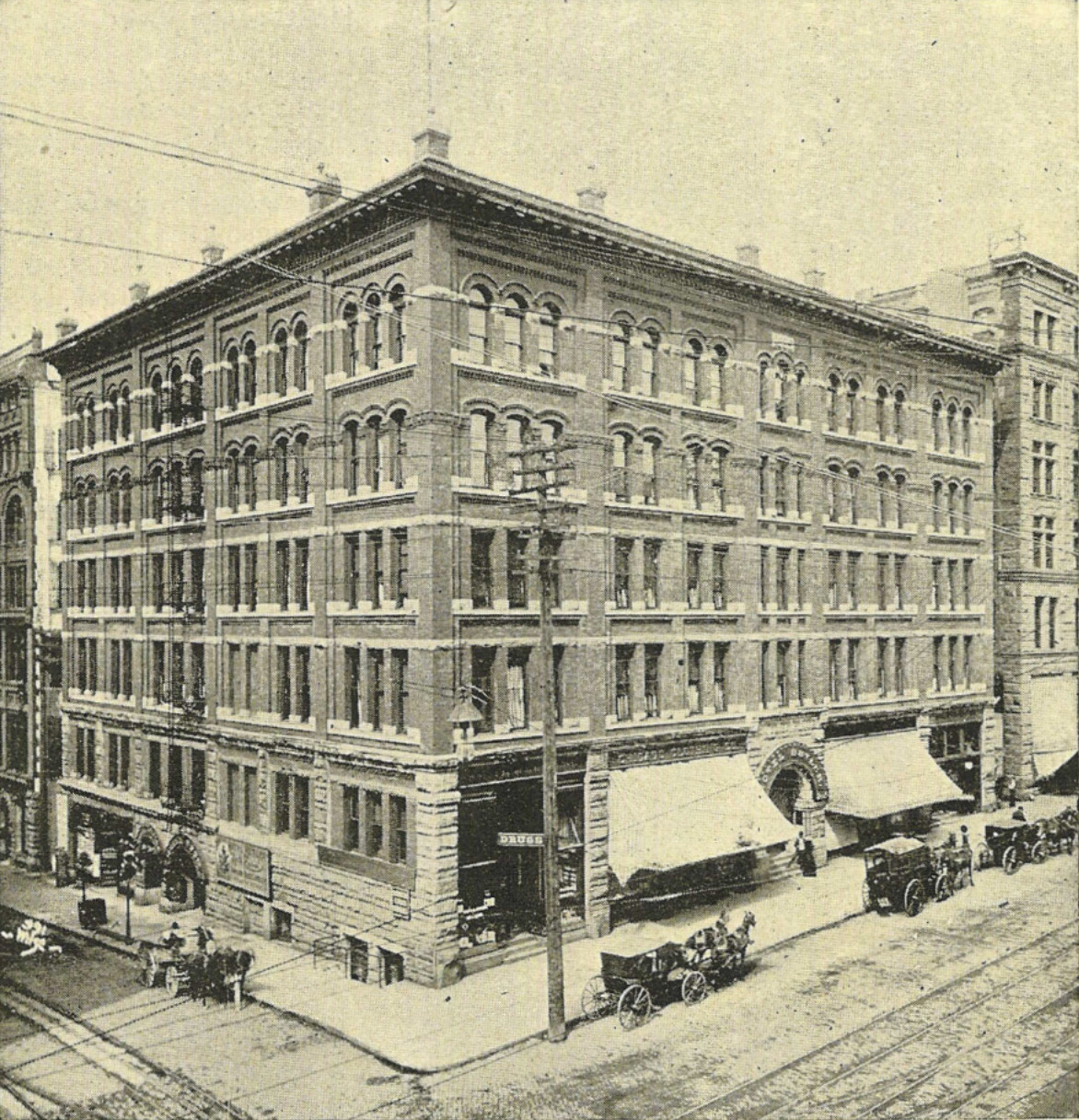
Butler Hotel, 1900

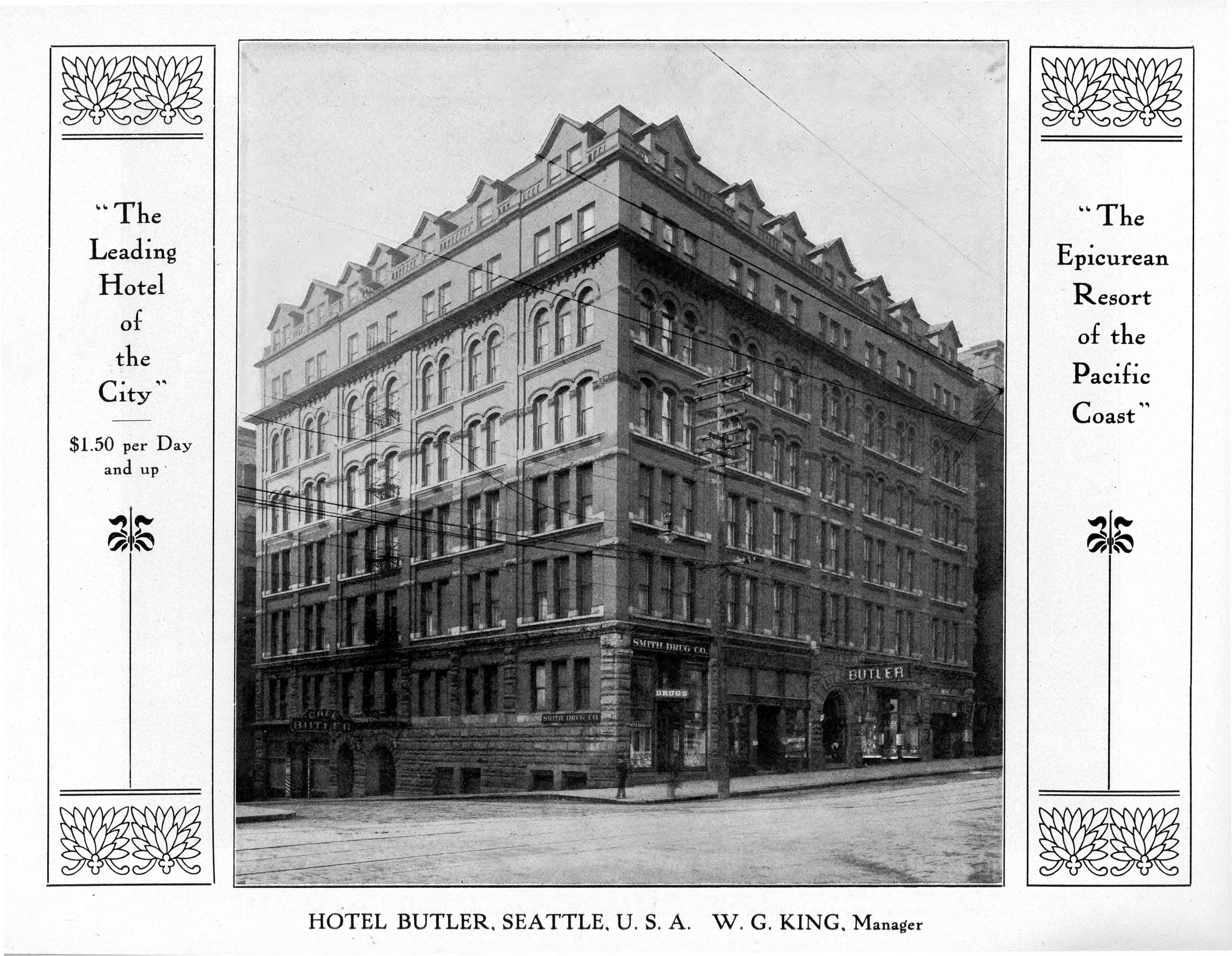
Butler Hotel 1909, with two more stories added.

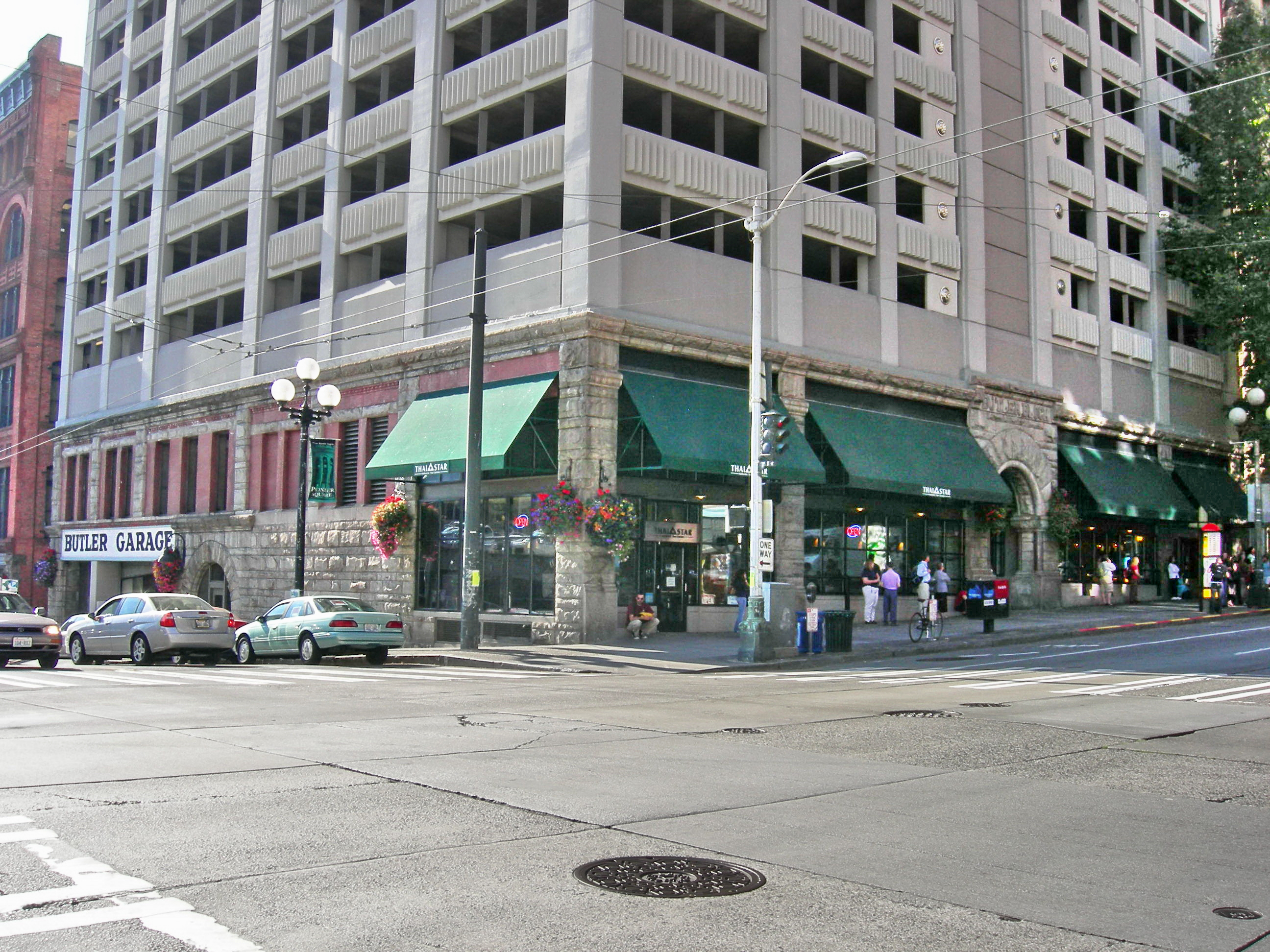
The base of the Butler Garage, 2007

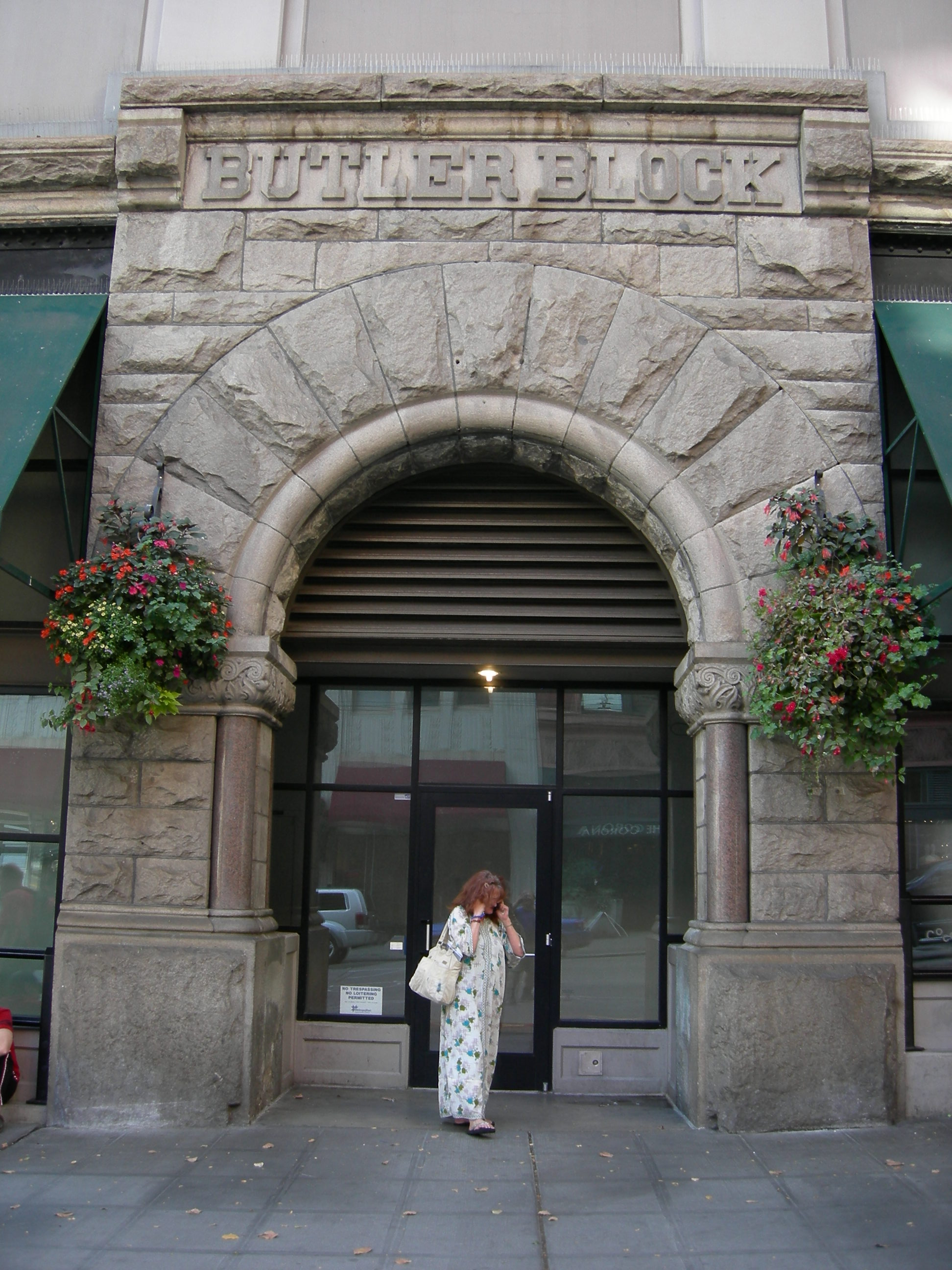
The former main entrance of the Butler Hotel, 2007

The Butler Hotel or Hotel Butler in Seattle, Washington, was one of Seattle's leading hotels in the late 19th and early 20th centuries. It was located at the corner of Second Avenue and James Street, in what is now the Pioneer Square-Skid Road National Historic District. During the Prohibition era, its Rose Room was repeatedly cited for flouting the laws against the consumption of alcoholic beverages. It closed in 1933; the lower two floors survive as part of the Butler Garage. The building itself is also known as the Butler Block, the name over the main entrance.

== Early history ==
One of Seattle's most elegant hotels, the building that was to become the Butler Hotel was built shortly after the Great Seattle Fire. Some years prior, Hillory Butler had owned and operated a truck garden on the quarter-block lot practically center of town and lived there in a small house. One of his conditions for the erection of a major building on his property in 1875 was that it would bear his name in perpetuity. The pre-fire Butler was a three-story wooden building.

Building plans for the new Butler Block were announced July 3, 1889, in the Seattle Post-Intelligencer, less than a month after the fire. Designed by the short-lived partnership of Parkinson and Evers, it was built as an office building, the Phinney and Jones Building, for Guy C. Phinney and Daniel C. Jones. The English-born John Parkinson of Parkinson and Evers had just arrived in Seattle from Napa, California, after the fire, and was for several years one of Seattle's leading architects, before moving to Los Angeles after the Panic of 1893. Seattle neighborhood Phinney Ridge is named after Phinney, one of the city's leading businessmen of the era. Jones, in contrast was a foulmouthed frontiersman who apparently carried a gun in each hip pocket. The new hotel opened in 1894 under the management of two German immigrants, Dietrich Hamm and Ferdinand Schmitz. It included a large dining room which was managed by Mr. Hamm. It was divided into both men's and women's sections. Included also was a grill room featuring fresh seafood and shell fish. Hamm and Schmitz operated the hotel until 1903, at which time Edward Sweeney of the Seattle Malting and Beverage Company secured the lease, forcing the retirement of Hamm and Schmitz.§

== Original layout ==
The building was originally five stories. In 1890–1891 a room on the fifth floor served as the meeting room for the Seattle City Council.

== Construction ==
The Butler Block was converted to the Butler Hotel in 1894. Later in that decade, it was the favored hostelry of those who returned wealthy from the Yukon Gold Rush. The hotel soon added its own electric plant and cold storage plant, as well as an open-front refrigerator in its grill room. Two more stories were added in 1903. The Butler became the center of the city's social life; guests included Alaskan con man, crime-boss, Soapy Smith, Japanese admiral Tōgō Heihachirō, American politicians William Jennings Bryan, Robert M. La Follette, Sr., and William Howard Taft, and railroad magnate James J. Hill.

== Reaction to minimum wage ==
In 1915, apparently in spiteful reaction to the enactment of a state minimum wage law, the Butler fired its maids, replacing them with an entirely Japanese immigrant staff. Two weeks later, under pressure from several directions, the original staff had their jobs restored.

== Prohibition ==
In the Prohibition era, the Butler's Rose Room "became synonymous with the city's informal night life". Victor Aloysius Meyers—later a Washington State politician—held forth as a bandleader, as did Jackie Souder. The young Bing Crosby tried out to sing at the Butler, but was told he needed more experience. John Edmondson Prim, later a founder of the Seattle Urban League and the first African American judge in the State of Washington, worked there as a waiter.

For many years, the Butler paid little or no attention to the laws against alcoholic beverages. "Liquor," Seattle businessman Henry Broderick explained decades later, "was not sold by the House, but in some devious, if not exactly mysterious way, whiskey had a habit of arriving at every one of the nearly one hundred tables in the establishment." As Seattlife magazine would comment in 1939, "... it was all in the course of an evening's fun to have the prohibition agents swoop in, seize partially concealed bottles of liquor from under the tables, perhaps arrest an employe (sic) or two, and then depart amid boos and not-too-subtle insults." This went on for roughly a decade, until in early 1929 the Butler was prohibited from allowing dancing after 9 p.m. In May 1929 the Rose Room was ordered closed for a year. When it reopened in 1930, amid the deepening Great Depression, things were simply not the same.

== Closing ==
The Butler closed September 5, 1933. Its contents were auctioned January 15, 1934. All but the bottom two floors were then razed, and a multi-story parking lot erected where the hotel had stood. Not everyone mourned: The Argus wrote "As a matter of fact the Butler was never a hotel to be especially proud of, although for years the food was considered the best in the city. It was constructed for an office building and later converted into a hotel. It was always a firetrap, and it is a very good thing that it is going the way it is instead of the way it might have gone." Eventually the garage came to be owned by Sam Israel and, after his death, the Samis Foundation. The parking garage underwent a major expansion in 2000.
