= Department of Parks and Recreation =

The Department of Parks and Recreation (DPR), also known as Board of Parks and Recreation or Park Board, is used by many government bodies to describe the parts of their organizations that oversee public parks and recreational public works.

Organizations using these terms include:

== Canada ==
- Toronto Parks, Forestry and Recreation Division, Ontario
- Vancouver Park Board, British Columbia

== United States ==
- Albany Parks & Recreation, Oregon
- California Department of Parks and Recreation
- City of Los Angeles Department of Recreation and Parks, California
- Columbia Parks and Recreation, Missouri
- Columbus Recreation and Parks Department, Ohio
- Decatur Parks and Recreation, Alabama
- Houston Parks and Recreation Department, Texas
- Los Angeles County Department of Parks and Recreation, California
- Maryland-National Capital Park and Planning Commission
- Minneapolis Park and Recreation Board, Minnesota
- Nashville Board of Parks and Recreation, Tennessee
- Newport News Department of Parks, Recreation and Tourism, Virginia
- New Orleans Recreation Department, Louisiana
- New York City Department of Parks and Recreation
- Omaha Department of Parks and Recreation, Nebraska
- Oregon Parks and Recreation Department
- Seattle Parks and Recreation, Washington
- Tennessee Department of Environment and Conservation
- Texas Parks and Wildlife Department
- Utah Division of Parks and Recreation

== See also ==
- Department of Natural Resources (disambiguation)
- Parks and Recreation, an American TV series
- Park district
